= American mythology =

Mythology of the United States

American mythology is the body of traditional stories pertaining to America's most legendary stories and folktales, dating back to the late 1700s when the first colonists settled and became the folklore of the United States. "American mythology" may also refer to the modern study of these representations, and to the subject matter as represented in the literature and art of other cultures in any period.

Stories from American mythology are the primary sources of inspiration for stories and tall tales such as Bigfoot, Paul Bunyan, and The Lone Ranger.

== American frontier ==
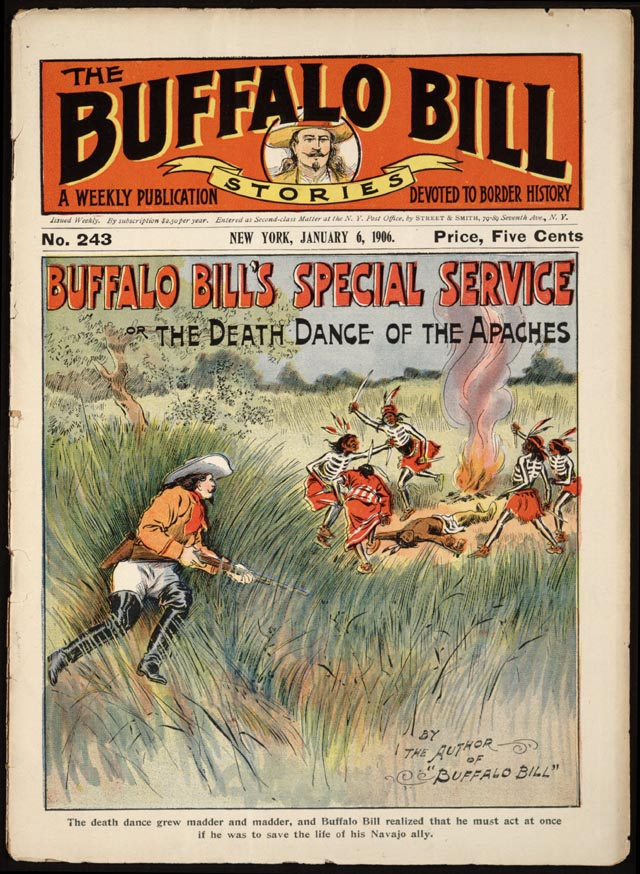
1906 weekly magazine cover

The frontier myth or myth of the West is one of the influential myths in American culture. The frontier is the concept of a place that exists at the edge of a civilization, particularly during a period of expansion. The American frontier occurred throughout the 17th to 20th centuries as European Americans colonized and expanded across North America. This period of time became romanticized and idealized in literature and art to form a myth. Historian Richard Slotkin defines the myth of the frontier as "America as a wide-open land of unlimited opportunity for the strong, ambitious, self-reliant individual to thrust his way to the top."

== Native American Buffalo ==
Native American culture is very much involved with mythology. They used mythology to tell great stories about their lives and the lives of their ancestors. They also would use stories to explain the supernatural connection between humans and certain animals. One very important aspect of the Native American mythology was the buffalo, also known as the Bison. The buffalo was seen as a potential food source to the Native Americans but were too hard to hunt, especially before the invention of guns so instead they were used in many rituals that included dancing and prayer. Most of the rituals were related to the difficulty of the catching and the killing of the buffalo.

The buffalo were considered to be sacred animals with knowledge about medicine, they were also seen as very powerful within the spirit world. Their body parts were used in many important religious rituals.

== Bigfoot ==
Bigfoot, also commonly referred to as Sasquatch, is a large and hairy human-like mythical creature alleged by some to inhabit forests in North America, particularly in the Pacific Northwest. Bigfoot is featured in both American and Canadian folklore, and since the mid-20th century has grown into a cultural icon, permeating popular culture and becoming the subject of its own distinct subculture.

== Fearsome critters ==
Fearsome critters In North American folklore were tall-tale animals jokingly said to inhabit the wilderness in or around logging camps, especially in the Great Lakes region. Today, the term may also be applied to similar fabulous beasts.

Fearsome critters include the Agropelter, Axehandle hound, Ball-tailed cat, Bigfoot, Cactus cat, Dungavenhooter, Glawackus, Gumberoo, Hidebehind, Hodag, Jackalope, Jersey Devil, Sidehill gouger, Splintercat, Squonk, Teakettler, Wampus cat, Belled buzzard, Gillygaloo bird, Goofus bird, Fur-bearing trout, Hoop snake, Joint snake, Snallygaster, and the Snow snake.
