= Minnesota folklore =

Minnesota folklore, although its study and documentation have never been a priority among academics, is present and varied. As the state has been the residence of such a wide variety of ethnic groups, Minnesota's folktales and folk songs are reflective of its history.

== Folk heroes ==
- Paul Bunyan, the legendary giant lumberjack
- Otto Walta, a Finnish-American homesteader and strongman from the northern Iron Range, is the hero of many folktales told around St. Louis County, Minnesota.
- Ola Värmlänning, a booze swilling, Swedish-American prankster from Minneapolis, can easily be compared to the German Till Eulenspiegel.
- Father Francis Xavier Pierz, a pioneer missionary priest, is the subject of many tales told among the Ojibwe people of White Earth Reservation and the German- and Slovenian-American Catholics of Stearns County, Minnesota.

== Folk creatures ==
- While not restricted to Minnesota, many wendigo myths and sightings originate from traditionally Ojibwe areas within Minnesota.
- The Minnesota Iceman.
- Pepie, a lake monster residing in Lake Pepin.
- Duluth, Minnesota is home to a myriad of supernatural urban legends and folktales. This includes sea monsters residing in Lake Superior.
- Fearsome critters, such as the teakettler, hugag, axehead hound, hidebehind, hoop snake, and jackalope.

== Folk songs ==
Much work of collecting Minnesota folk songs was conducted during the Great Depression by Bessie M. Stanchfield, whose papers and research are now housed by the Minnesota Historical Society.

- "The Beauty of the West", a Minnesota pioneer ballad from the 1850s, was collected by Stanchfield in spring 1936. She arranged for it to be published for the first time in the Minnesota History in September 1946.

== Other ==
- Keningston runestone
