= Fearsome Creatures of the Lumberwoods, With a Few Desert and Mountain Beasts =

1910 fantasy field guide by William Thomas Cox

Fearsome Creatures of the Lumberwoods
- Pictograph as seen on title page (1910)
- Author: William T. Cox
- Original title: Fearsome Creatures of the Lumberwoods, With a Few Desert and Mountain Beasts
- Illustrator: Coert Du Bois
- Language: English
- Genre: Fantasy, Field guide, Bestiary
- Publisher: Judd & Detweiler, Inc.
- Publication date: 1910
- Publication place: United States
- Media type: Print (hardcover)
- Pages: 47
- Text: Fearsome Creatures of the Lumberwoods at Wikisource

Fearsome Creatures of the Lumberwoods, With a Few Desert and Mountain Beasts is a 1910 fantasy field guide by William Thomas Cox (1878–1961), Minnesota's first State Forester and Commissioner of Conservation, with illustrations by Coert du Bois (1881–1960; US Consul and forester) and Latin classifications by George Bishop Sudworth (1862–1927; Chief Dendrologist of the Forest Service.) The text is a noteworthy resource on folklore, as a century after its initial publication Fearsome Creatures remains one of the principal sources on legendary creatures of the United States and Canada.

== Summary ==
The book presents various sketches of fearsome critters from North American folklore. Cox is the first to use the term "Fearsome Creatures" to refer to the menagerie of creatures that were the subjects of the practical jokes and tall tales originating chiefly in the logging camps around the Great Lakes region around the turn of the twentieth century. The book is arranged to include an entry for each creature. Cox gives a description of the creature, preceded by a full-page landscape illustration by du Bois. Like in a traditional field guide, each animal is assigned a Latin classification (by Sudworth), then notes their habitat, physical features, and behavior. At the end of each account, there is usually a brief anecdote detailing an encounter with the creature.

Fearsome Creatures may be classified as a work of metafiction.

"The lumber regions are contracting. Stretches of forest that once seemed boundless are all but gone, and many a stream is quiet that once ran full of logs and echoed to the song of the river driver. Some say that the old type of logger himself is becoming extinct. It is my purpose in this little book to preserve at least a description and sketch of some of the interesting animals which he has originated."

— William T. Cox, Fearsome Creatures of the Lumberwoods

In the introduction, Cox acknowledges the varmints as "animals which he [the lumberjack] has originated". Given the book's mixed field-guide narrative format, it is unclear whether the introduction belongs within or outside the primary context. At times, the storyteller (identified as Cox himself in the introduction) employs the more ambiguous woodsmen/logger's phrases, such as "tell of" or "out comes the rumor of". Other times he declares to the reader that there "ranges" or "is" such a creature.

== Publication history ==
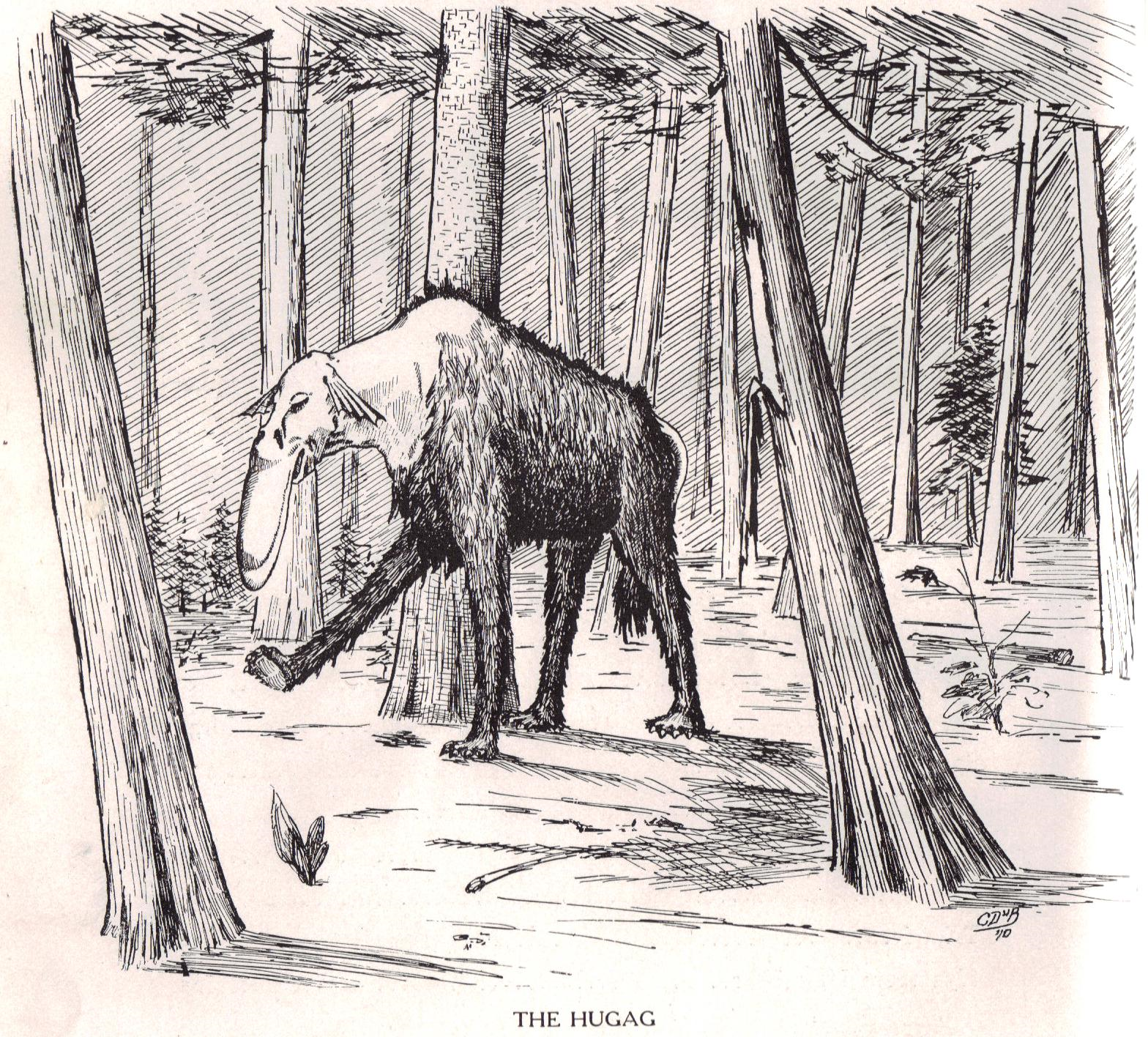
The hugag as illustrated by Coert Du Bois

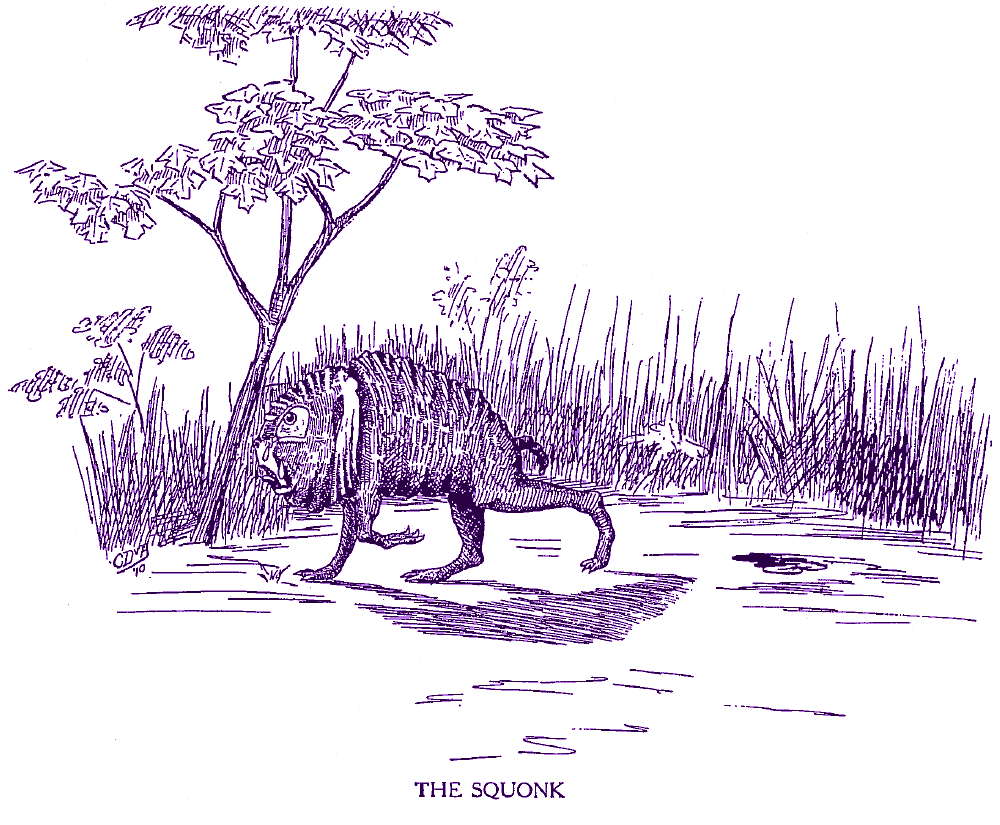
The squonk as illustrated by Coert Du Bois.

First published in 1910 by the Press of Judd & Detweiler, Inc., Fearsome Creatures wasn't reprinted until half a century later when the full manuscript was included as a bonus in Walker D. Wyman's Mythical Creatures of the North Country. It was published on its own again by Bishop Publishing Co. in 1984. The following year it was again put into hard-copy by Kessinger Publishing. The original edition is in 35 United States WorldCat libraries.

When writing Fearsome Critters in 1939, Henry Tryon acknowledged William Cox for allowing him to use the information from Fearsome Creatures of the Lumberwoods. In the preface of Fearsome Critters, Tryon expressed a mutual desire to preserve logger and lumberjack folklore before these nostalgic stories were lost. Many enthusiastically contributed stories to Tryon’s collection. He believed many of these tales, such as the Hodag, may have existed for up to a century before they were written down, and probably reached the camps on the West Coast.

Tryon noted that “nearly all these mythical creatures originated, and still flourish to a considerable extent, almost wholly in the Northern Forests.” He speculated that, although their southern logger counterparts shared their imagination, they may not be “given to this particular form of mental horseplay” because their race had a “considerable dash of definite superstition.” William Cox also included a casually disparaging description of a person of color in one of his creature stories.

These story collections provide a snapshot of everyday life in a Northern lumber camp. And although the camps employed men from all over the world, the stories offer glimpses of prejudice faced by many lumberjacks.

Excerpts from Fearsome Creatures have been featured in a number of other publications, including:

- Fearsome critters, by Henry Harrington Tryon
- A Treasury of American folklore, by B.A. Botkin
- Book of imaginary beings, by Jorge Luis Borges
- Man and beast in American comic legend, by Richard M. Dorson
- Fearsome critters: Folktales from the forest and desert, by Muriel Underwood and Ralph Creasman
- Fantastic beasts and where to find them, by J.K. Rowling

== Historical connections ==
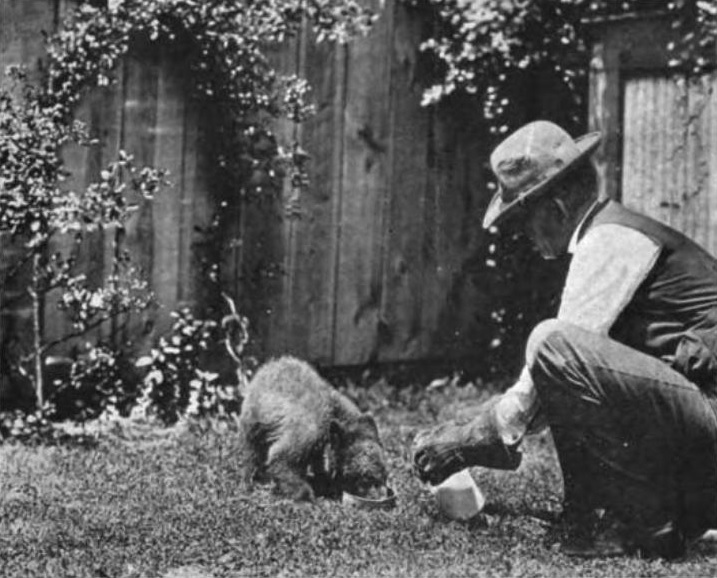
Eugene S. Bruce with his bear.

In the tradition of American tall tales and folklore, not all of the narrations are complete fabrications. Instead they are highly embellished stories elaborated on personal experiences.

In the narrative of Hyampom Hog Bear, a hog bear cub is found in Klamath River, California and taken by Eugene S. Bruce to the National Zoo in Washington D.C. This account is also recorded in The Land We Live In, The Book of Conservation by Overton W. Price. In this version Bruce did in fact catch a cub with his bare hands while trekking through the California mountains; the accompanying image stating underneath, "It [the bear] is now in the Washington Zoo", albeit the animal pictured is presumably not a hog bear.

Likewise, in the sketch of the snoligoster there is a reference to Inman F. Eldredge (1883–1963), a Gifford Pinchot Medal awardee, who, while pursuing an escaped fugitive in the everglades, encounters the dreadful swamp-wyrm which afterward devours the criminal—an episode which is doubtlessly a fanciful idealization of Eldredge's background as a timber cruiser in Southern Florida.

Other persons referenced in Fearsome Creatures are John P. Wentling (1878-1952), who was Professor of Forestry at both the Pennsylvania State Forest Academy and University of Minnesota, A. B. Patterson (Forest Service), Big Ole Kittleson, Gus Demo, Bill Murphy, and John Gray.

== See also ==
- Agropelter
- Cactus Cat
- Gumberoo
- Hodag
- Hugag
- Snallygaster
- Squonk
- Fearsome critters
- Legendary creatures
- Cryptozoology
