= Goofus =

Goofus may refer to:

- Couesnophone, saxophone-like musical instrument also known as Goofus
- "Goofus" (song), 1930 song later recorded by The Carpenters
- Goofus, character in Goofus and Gallant American comic strip
- Goofus glass, type of early 20th-century glass
- Goofus bird, mythical American backward-flying bird
