= Fantastic Beasts and Where to Find Them (book) =

2001 book by J. K. Rowling

- First edition cover
- Author: J. K. Rowling (credited as Newt Scamander)
- Cover artist: Richard Horne
- Language: English
- Series: Harry Potter
- Genre: Fantasy
- Publisher: Bloomsbury (UK) (Canada 2010–present); Arthur A. Levine/ Scholastic (US); Raincoast (Canada 1998–2010)
- Publication date: 12 March 2001
- Publication place: United Kingdom
- Pages: 128
- ISBN: 978-1338216790

Fantastic Beasts and Where to Find Them (often referred to as simply Fantastic Beasts) is a 2001 guide book written by British author J. K. Rowling (under the pen name of the fictitious author Newt Scamander) about the magical creatures in the Harry Potter universe. The original version, illustrated by the author herself, purports to be Harry Potter's copy of the textbook of the same name mentioned in Harry Potter and the Philosopher's Stone (or Harry Potter and the Sorcerer's Stone in the US), the first novel of the Harry Potter series. It includes several notes inside it supposedly handwritten by Harry, Ron Weasley, and Hermione Granger, detailing their own experiences with some of the beasts described, and including inside jokes relating to the original series.

In a 2001 interview with publisher Scholastic, Rowling stated that she chose the subject of magical creatures because it was a fun topic for which she had already developed much information in earlier books. Rowling's name did not appear on the cover of the first edition, the work being credited under the pen name "Newt Scamander", who, in the books, wrote this textbook as seen on Harry's supply list for his first year.

The book benefits the BBC affiliated charity Comic Relief. Over 80% of the cover price of each book sold goes directly to poor children in various places around the world. According to Comic Relief, sales from this book and its companion Quidditch Through the Ages had raised over £17 million by July 2009.

On 12 September 2013, Warner Bros. and Rowling announced they would be producing a film inspired by the book, being the first in a series of five such films. Rowling herself was the screenwriter. She came up with a plan for a movie after Warner Bros. suggested the idea. The story features Newt Scamander as a main character and is set in New York City, 70 years before Harry's story started. The film was released on 18 November 2016.

On 14 March 2017 a new edition of the book, with cover illustrations by Jonny Duddle and interior illustrations by Tomislav Tomic, was published with six new creatures and a foreword by Newt Scamander. It is assumed to be a new copy as it does not feature any handwritten notes. Proceeds from this edition are donated to Lumos as well as Comic Relief.

On 7 November 2017 a new edition was published with illustrations by Olivia Lomenech Gill, featuring the aforementioned 2017 text. On 1 February 2018 a Kindle in Motion edition, featuring these illustrations with movement, was released for compatible devices.

== Synopsis ==
=== Original "for Muggles" version ===
Fantastic Beasts purports to be a reproduction of a textbook owned by Harry Potter and written by magizoologist Newt Scamander, a character in the fictional Harry Potter series. In the series, magizoology is the study of magical creatures.

Albus Dumbledore, headmaster of Hogwarts, provides the foreword and explains the purpose of the special edition of this book (the Comic Relief charity). At the end, he assures muggle readers, "The amusing creatures described hereafter are fictional and cannot hurt you." He repeats the Hogwarts motto: "Draco dormiens nunquam titillandus", Latin for "Never tickle a sleeping dragon".

Fantastic Beasts and Where to Find Them contains the history of magizoology and describes 85 magical species found around the world. Scamander says that he collected most of the information found in the book through observations made over years of travel across five continents. He notes that the first edition was commissioned in 1918 by Augustus Worme of Obscurus Books. However, it was not published until 1927. It is now in its fifty-second edition.

In the Harry Potter universe, the book is a required textbook for first-year Hogwarts students, having been an approved textbook since its first publication. In his foreword to the book, Albus Dumbledore notes that it serves as an excellent reference for wizarding households in addition to its use at Hogwarts.

The book features doodles and comments added by Harry Potter and Ron Weasley, who apparently shares the book with Harry "because his fell apart". The comments would appear to have been written around the time of the fourth book, Harry Potter and the Goblet of Fire. These doodles add some extra information for fans of the series (for example the "Acromantula" entry has a comment confirming that Hogwarts is located in Scotland) along with comic relief (such as Harry stating "you're not kidding" when talking about the Hungarian Horntail being the most fearsome dragon of all, a reference to Harry's encounter with one in the fourth book).

The cover design of the first edition of the book features apparent claw marks from an unidentified animal.

=== 2017 "for Wizards" version ===
This edition features six new creatures: the hidebehind, the hodag, the horned serpent, the snallygaster, the thunderbird, and the wampus cat, in addition to the original 75, and the illustrations are replaced. Newt Scamander, in the foreword, explains the reason the six new creatures were not previously included is because MACUSA president Seraphina Picquery requested the more important American creatures not be mentioned to deter wizarding sightseers at a time when the US wizarding community were subject to greater persecution than their European counterparts, and after Scamander had contributed to a serious breach of the International Statute of Secrecy in New York.

=== Role in the Harry Potter series ===
The book's fictional author, Newt Scamander, does not appear in the main Harry Potter book series.

However, his name is seen on the Marauder's Map in Harry Potter and the Prisoner of Azkaban film. He is the central character of the Fantastic Beasts film series, in which he is played by Eddie Redmayne.

== Featured beasts ==
The following mythological beasts are listed in the book:

- Acromantula
- Ashwinder
- Augurey
- Basilisk
- Billywig
- Bowtruckle
- Bundimun
- Centaur
- Chimaera
- Chizpurfle
- Clabbert
- Crup
- Demiguise
- Diricawl
- Doxy
- Dragon
  - Antipodean Opaleye
  - Chinese Fireball
  - Common Welsh Green
  - Hebridean Black
  - Hungarian Horntail
  - Norwegian Ridgeback
  - Peruvian Vipertooth
  - Romanian Longhorn
  - Swedish Short-Snout
  - Ukrainian Ironbelly
- Dugbog
- Erlking
- Erumpent
- Fairy
- Fire Crab
- Flobberworm
- Fwooper
- Ghoul
- Glumbumble
- Gnome
- Graphorn
- Griffin
- Grindylow
- Hidebehind
- Hippocampus
- Hippogriff
- Hodag
- Horklump
- Horned serpent
- Imp
- Jarvey
- Jobberknoll
- Kappa
- Kelpie
- Knarl
- Kneazle
- Leprechaun
- Lethifold
- Lobalug
- Mackled Malaclaw
- Manticore
- Merpeople
- Moke
- Mooncalf
- Murtlap
- Niffler
- Nogtail
- Nundu
- Occamy
- Phoenix
- Pixie
- Plimpy
- Pogrebin
- Porlock
- Puffskein
- Quintaped
- Ramora
- Red Cap
- Re'em
- Runespoor
- Salamander
- Sea serpent
- Shrake
- Snallygaster
- Snidget
- Sphinx
- Streeler
- Tebo
- Thunderbird
- Troll
- Unicorn
- Wampus cat
- Werewolf
- Winged horse
- Yeti

== Editions ==
Scholastic editions
Paperback: ISBN 0-439-29501-7
Hardcover Box Set: ISBN 0-439-32162-X (Includes Fantastic Beasts... and Quidditch Through the Ages)
Paperback Box Set: ISBN 0-439-28403-1
Bloomsbury edition
2001 paperback: ISBN 0-7475-5466-8
2009 paperback: ISBN 978-1-408-80301-1
2017 hardcover: ISBN 978-1-408-88071-5
Sagebrush Rebound edition
School & Library Edition: ISBN 0-613-32541-9
Pottermore E-book edition
Original version: ISBN 978-1-78110-014-1
2017 edition: ISBN 978-1-78110-556-6
2017 Olivia Lomenech Gill illustrated edition: ISBN 978-1408885260
Raincoast edition
Paperback: ISBN 1-55192-456-0

== Reception ==
Jeff Jensen of Entertainment Weekly graded the book with an "A" and wrote "With its richly detailed history lessons and witty debate parsing the differences between being and beast, plus a compendium of 85 magical creatures that's chockablock with Rowling's trademark wordplay (Glumbumble is a standout), Beasts adds a vital new dimension to the Potter mythology."

== Adaptations ==
=== Audiobook ===
The 2017 version of the book was recorded as an unabridged audiobook in 2017. The audiobook is read by Eddie Redmayne in the character of Newt Scamander.

In 2018, the American Library Association named it one of the Top Ten Amazing Audiobooks for Young Adults.

=== Film adaptations ===
Fantastic Beasts and Where to Find Them is a British-American fantasy film inspired by the book of the same name by J. K. Rowling. An extension of the wizarding world from the Harry Potter film series and directed by David Yates, the film stars Eddie Redmayne, Katherine Waterston, Alison Sudol, Dan Fogler, Samantha Morton, Ezra Miller, Colin Farrell, Carmen Ejogo, Faith Wood-Blagrove, Jenn Murray, Jon Voight and Ron Perlman. The first movie is set to be followed by four more. Principal photography commenced on 17 August 2015, at Warner Bros. Studios, Leavesden. Fantastic Beasts and Where to Find Them was released in the United Kingdom and the United States on 18 November 2016.

A sequel was released on 16 November 2018. The third movie was released on 15 April 2022 in the United Kingdom and 22 April 2022 in the United States.

=== Cultural adaptations ===
Fantastic Beasts - The Wonder of Nature was an exhibition at the Natural History Museum, London. The exhibition, which ran between 2020 and 2021, is a collaboration between the museum, Warner Bros. and The BBC Studios Natural History Unit The exhibition is a 'hybrid show' which uses digital interactive installations as well as specimens from the Natural History Museum collection. The show was also featured on Google Arts and Culture as an online exhibition. The exhibition was forced to close its doors a day after opening after London was put on tighter COVID-19 restriction. The museum promoted the online exhibit via its social media and website.
