= William T. Cox =

American forester

- Occupation: forester
- Known for: Fearsome Creatures of the Lumberwoods

Signature
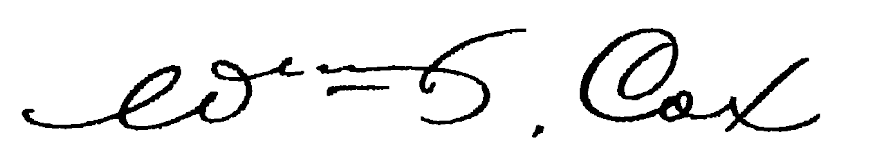

William Thomas Cox (1878–1961) was the first State Forester and Commissioner of Conservation for Minnesota. Cox worked as a forester for the United States Forest Service prior to his appointment as State Forester. After leaving office, in 1929, Cox traveled to Brazil to organize the Brazilian Forest Service including exhaustive exploration of the Amazon Basin. Returning to the United States in 1931, Cox was appointed as the first Commissioner of Conservation for Minnesota.

== Career ==
=== Forester ===
Cox organized the state forest protection system, which was enacted in 1911. Cox was dismissed as state forester in 1924. During his entire term he had been critical of timber sales, placed under the state auditor's office in 1895.

=== Writing ===
Cox was an avid writer and wrote heavily on forestry, nature, and conservation topics. Cox contributed a recurring column in the magazine The Farmer and exerts of which were later published as Wild Animals of the Field and Forest and, with coauthor Dietrich Lange, Bird Stories. Cox is perhaps best known today for his collection of folkloric sketches, Fearsome Creatures of the Lumberwoods, With a Few Desert and Mountain Beasts, a chief literary resource on fearsome critters of North American folklore.

== See also ==
- Fearsome Creatures of the Lumberwoods, With a Few Desert and Mountain Beasts
- Fearsome critters
- United States Forest Service
