= Achlis =

Mythical creature described by Pliny the Elder

The achlis was one of a number of strange creatures listed in Roman mythology by Pliny the Elder in the 1st century BC. He described it as saying it looked somewhat like an elk, though it bore some very strange characteristics. It was said its upper lip was so large that it had to graze backwards to avoid its lip falling over its mouth.

A great problem because its back legs had no joints, forcing it to sleep standing up or leaning against a tree. This allowed hunters a relatively easy way to catch them. They chopped halfway through the tree where the creature slept and when the achlis put any weight against it he fell onto the ground. Because of its back legs, it could not get to its feet fast enough to get away.

== See also ==
- Hugag
