= Ola Värmlänning =

Ola Värmlänning was a drunken prankster whose legendary exploits were once very popular among the Swedish-American communities of Minnesota. A Swedish language book about him is in the collections of the Minnesota Historical Society.

== See also ==
- Minnesota folklore

== Sources ==
- Swanson, Roy (1948). "A Swedish Immigrant Folk Figure: Ola Värmlänning" (PDF). Minnesota History. 29 (2): 105–113. JSTOR 20175384.
