= Fatu-liva =

Fictional bird species

The supposed nest of the Fatu-liva, showing the "eggs": Chappell (1921).

The Fatu-liva is a fictional species of bird invented by George S. Chappell in his travel parody The Cruise of the Kawa: Wanderings in the South Seas, by Walter E. Traprock (1921). Fatu-liva were said to be found only in the fictional "Filbert Islands" in the South Pacific Ocean where they laid cube-like, black-spotted eggs that were very similar in appearance to dice. The bird's nest was described in the book as:

"...a semi-spheric bowl of closely woven grass in which lay four snow-white, polka-dotted cubes, the marvelous square eggs of the fatu-liva."

Additionally, a black-and-white photograph of what was supposedly the bird's dice-like eggs was provided. Its caption read:

"This is without question the most extraordinary picture which has ever been taken of any natural history subject. It corroborates in most convincing manner the author's claim to the discovery of the wonderful fatu-liva bird with its unique gift of laying square eggs. Here we see the eggs themselves in all the beauty of their cubical form and quaint marking; here we see the nest itself, made of delicately woven haro and brought carefully from the tree's summit by its discoverer, Babai-Alova-Babai. An extremely interesting feature of the picture is the presence in the nest of lapa or signal-feather. By close observation, Mr. Whinney, the scientist of the expedition, discovered that whenever the mother-bird left the nest in search of food she always decorated her home with one of her wing feathers which served as a signal to her mate that she would return shortly, which she invariably did. Skeptics have said that it would be impossible to lay a square egg. To which the author is justly entitled to say: 'The camera never lies.'"

The name "Fatu-liva" probably derives from the real island of Fatu Hiva, sometimes spelled Fatu Iva. The name Fatu Hiva means "strange rock" in the Marquesan language. "Fatu-liva" is a theoretically possible transcription of terms like fatu riva ("encircled rock") in some Polynesian languages.

== See also ==
- Gillygaloo
- The Ascent of Rum Doodle
