= Hodag Country Festival =

Country music festival in Wisconsin, U.S.

Coordinates: 45°40′45″N 89°25′29″W

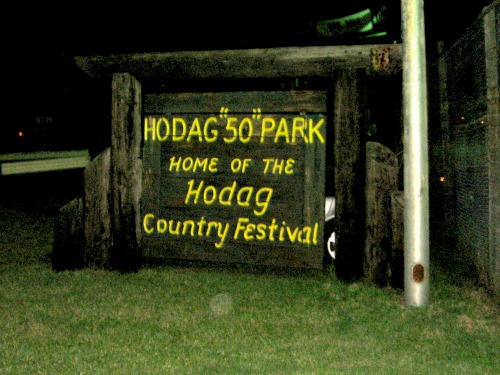
The entrance sign of the Hodag Country Festival in 2012.

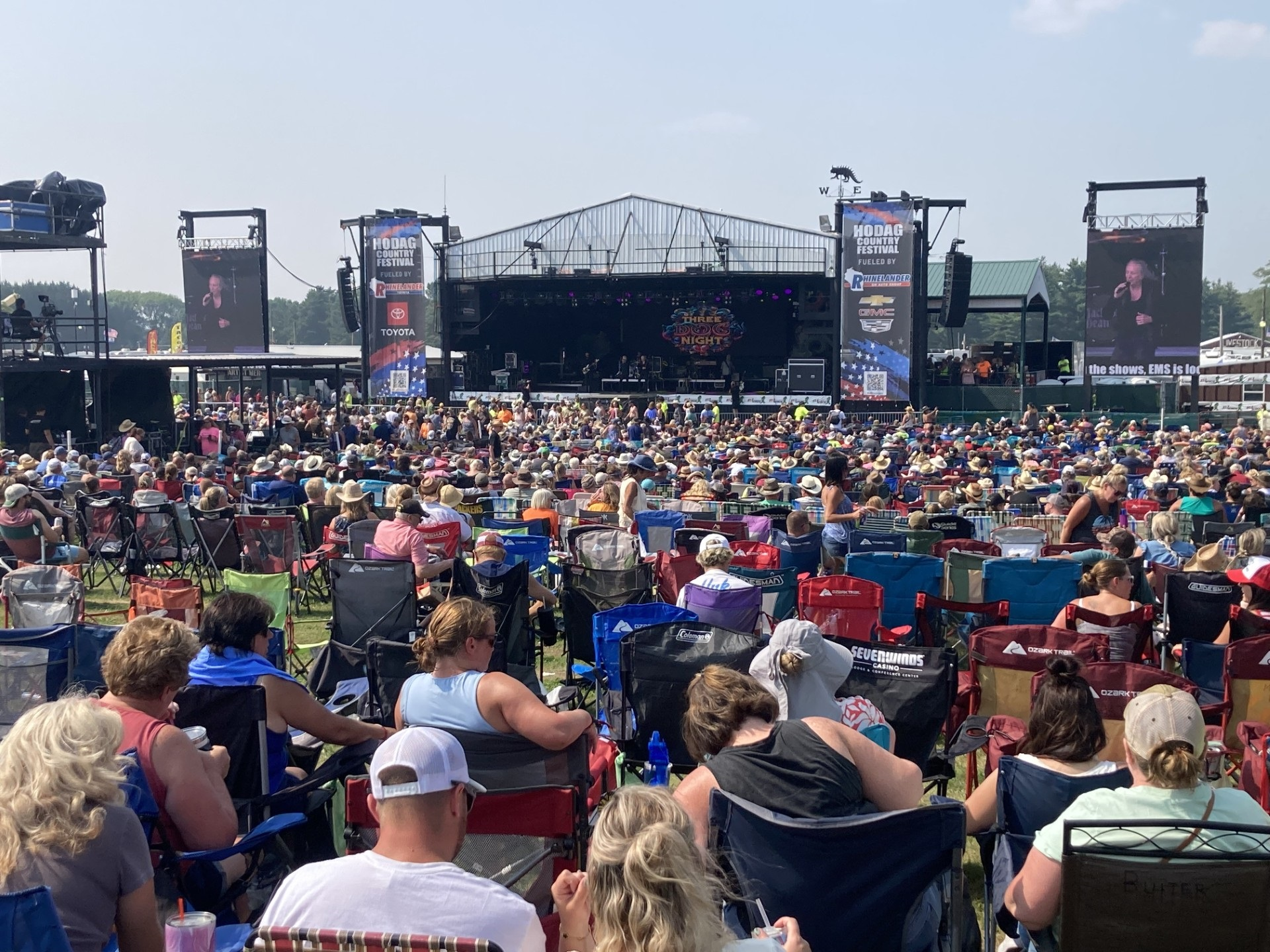
Photo of Hodag Country Music Festival 2025

The Hodag Country Festival, named after the folkloric Hodag, is an outdoor country music festival usually held the second weekend of July in Rhinelander, Wisconsin. Celebrating its 45th Anniversary in 2023, the festival has grown from 500 attendees at the first event to over 25,000 per day, with a total attendance of 30,000 - 50,000 people annually. There was no festival in 2020 due to the COVID-19 pandemic.

The festival was created by Bernie and Diane Eckert, Ernie Feight, and Ted Tschannen (who would leave the group approximately two years later.) Feight would remain a part of the venture until 1994, when he sold his shares to the Eckert's children. The festival would become the sole business interest of the Eckert children after 2008.

The first festival was held on August 4th – 6th, 1978 and featured Freddy Fender and Jana Jae. Country Music Hall of Fame inductees who have performed include:

- Brooks and Dunn
- Garth Brooks
- Glen Campbell
- Roy Clark
- Charlie Daniels
- Little Jimmy Dickens
- Merle Haggard
- Emmylou Harris
- George Jones
- Loretta Lynn
- Reba McEntire
- Ronnie Milsap
- The Oak Ridge Boys
- Charlie Pride
- Kenny Rogers
- Mel Tillis
- Randy Travis
- Don Williams
- Tammy Wynette

Since 1981, country music radio stations in Wisconsin and the Upper Peninsula of Michigan have sponsored regional contests. The first-place winners of each region can then advance to the Hodag Country Festival to compete for the title of Wisconsin State Country Band Champion.

== See also ==
- List of country music festivals
- Country music
