= The Last of the Really Great Whangdoodles =

1974 novel by Julie Edwards

- First edition (US)
- Author: Julie Andrews Edwards
- Language: English
- Genre: Fantasy novel
- Publisher: Harper & Row (US); Collins (UK)
- Publication date: 1974
- Publication place: United States
- Media type: Print
- Pages: 277
- ISBN: 0-06-021806-1
- OCLC: 979976
- LC Class: PZ7.A5673 Las

The Last of the Really Great Whangdoodles is a children's novel written by Julie Edwards, the married name of singer and actress Dame Julie Andrews. More recent editions credit the book to "Julie Andrews Edwards".

== Plot summary ==
Three siblings, Ben, Tom, and Melinda Potter (better known as Lindy), meet Professor Savant while visiting the zoo one rainy day. On Halloween, Lindy gets dared by her brother to knock on the spookiest house on the block for a quarter, which happens to belong to the Professor, and the three become more acquainted with him. After a second meeting, they begin spending time at the Professor's house, where he introduces them to games of concentration and observation. He reveals that there is a magic land called Whangdoodleland which can only be reached through the imagination, and he is training them to accompany him there.

Whangdoodleland is the home of the last Whangdoodle that lived in the world. Once the Whangdoodle, and other creatures that are now considered imaginary, lived in our world. However, fearing that people were losing their imaginations in the pursuit of power and greed, the Whangdoodle created a magic and peaceful world over which he reigns as king. The professor and the children explore this world.

Each time the children return, they venture further and further into Whangdoodleland, intending to reach the palace where the Last Whangdoodle resides. However, the Whangdoodle's Prime Minister, the "Oily Prock", does not want them to disturb His Highness, and sets up some traps, both in Whangdoodleland and the real world to prevent this meeting. He enlists the marvelous and funny creatures of the land in his effort, including the High Behind Splintercat, the Sidewinders, the Oinck, the Gazooks, the Tree Squeaks, and the Swamp Gaboons. The children use their imaginations, intelligence, and the friendship of another denizen, the Whiffle Bird, to outwit the traps.

The kids finally meet the last Whangdoodle. It turns out he wants a female Whangdoodle to be his queen, so he won't be lonely, and Professor Savant's knowledge and talents have the ability to grant this to the Whangdoodle. The professor initially believes he cannot do this, but using his imagination he creates a female Whangdoodle. The children return to Earth, promising that they will return to Whangdoodleland.

== Reception ==
At the time of the book's publication, Judith Viorst said of the book in The New York Times, "Unfortunately, Julie (Andrews) Edwards is more committed to improving her young readers than she is to entertaining them, and her book is sunk by an overload of virtue."

Author Aimee Bender cites the book as one that sticks with her most from childhood.
