= Gillygaloo =

Mythical creature from American folklore

In American folklore, the gillygaloo bird is a fearsome critter that nest on hillsides and lays square eggs, so they will not roll. The eggs are also spotted, giving them the characteristics of dice if hard-boiled.

== Name usage ==
The term gillygaloo has existed since the late nineteenth century. It appears in writing in 1899 among a collection of stories told by Adirondack guides entitled In The Land of the Loon, by Frank Kimball Scribner and Earl Williams Mayo. The term is applied to an ordinary trout as part of a practical joke on unsuspecting vacationers.

Likewise, the name reappears in the periodical The Echo of Seneca, published annually by the junior class of Hobart College, in Geneva, New York, referencing the location of a banquet held in 1893. The first record of gillygalloo to apply to the eponymous bird appears in the print in "Paul Bunyan Natural History" by folklorist Charles E. Brown in 1935.

== Characteristics ==
The pamphlet "Paul Bunyan Natural History" was created by Brown with source material derived from original interviews conducted among veteran loggers in the Great Lakes. Republished in B.A. Botkin's A Treasury of American Folklore, in the pamphlet, Brown relates:

GILLYGALOO. This hillside plover nested on the slopes of Bunyan's famous Pyramid Forty. Living in such a locality it laid square eggs so that they could not roll down the steep incline. The lumberjacks hardboiled these eggs and used them as dice.

While Brown's pamphlet is the first to connect the name to a square-egg-laying bird, it is not the first to reference a creature with these attributes. In "Some Lumberjack Myths," by J. E. Rockwell, published in 1910, in the nature journal The Outer's Book, the author describes a bird known as the "Deep-Winter-Flying-Midget." According to Rockwell, the bird was purported to lay eggs in the snow rather than a nest, as it was cold rather than warmth that hatched them. Rockwell added that the eggs were square rather than round to prevent them from rolling down mountain slopes.

Later, George Shepard Chappell, under the pseudonym Walter E. Traprock, in his 1921 travel guide parody The Cruise of Kawa Wandering in the South Seas describes the fatu-liva. The fatu-liva live in the, nonexistent, Filbert Islands and lay square eggs resulting in a "piercing screech of pain ending in a long yowl of joy." The eggs are mentioned as cube-shaped and covered in dots. An accompanying photograph depicts the eggs looking much like dice; however, dice are never mentioned in the text. Additionally, there is a photograph of a proclaimed "Fledgling Fatu-Liva," which the author adds is male and the likelihood of progeny is contingent on a subsequent expedition to the island.

== See also ==
- Fatu-liva
- Goofus bird
- Fearsome critters
- Folklore of the United States
