= Dungavenhooter =

Mythical creature from American folklore

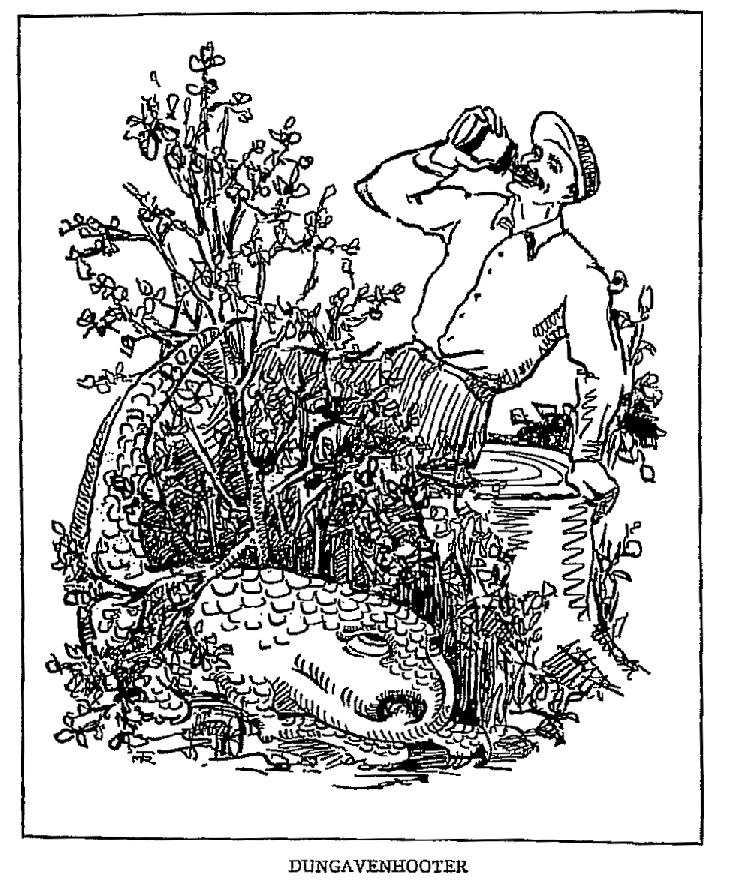
The Dungavenhooter. Illustration by Margaret Ramsay Tryon (1892–1978) Fearsome Critters by Henry H. Tryon.

In American folklore, the dungavenhooter is a fearsome critter described as resembling a large crocodylian animal, lacking a mouth, which consumes prey by pulverizing its human prey into vapor, and snorting them through the large holes of its nose.

== Characteristics ==
The dungavenhooter appears in the 1939 book on folklore, Fearsome Critters, by Henry Harrington Tryon (1888–1953), wherein the animal is purported to have once been sighted in marshlands from Maine to Michigan, but has since been extirpated outside the upper peninsula of Michigan, and has become rare. Tryon relates that the dungavenhooter lies in wait behind a brush with "Satanic cunning" until a "passing logger" comes within the striking range of its tail. The dungavenhooter is partial to devour intoxicated individuals who have had too much rum. Subsequently, the dungavenhooter catches its prey by surprise, pounding them into a "gaseous" state with its tail and inhaling them through its "wide" and "abnormally large" nostrils.

The dungavenhooter appears to be a version of the Dungarvon Whooper myth such as the "yarn" told by Leroy Dudley, a noted mountain guide and storyteller at the Chimney Pond campground on Katahdin, the tallest mountain in Maine. It has been noted that the Dungarvon Whooper of Dungarvon River in New Brunswick is usually depicted as a typical ghost, but it is also sometimes described as being reincarnated into a panther-like creature.

The dungavenhooter is classed as a "fearsome critter", i.e., a creation of tall tale, akin to the jackalope.

== See also ==
- Dungarvon Whooper
- Fearsome critters
- Hodag
- Underwater panther
