= George S. Chappell =

American architect

- Born: George Shepard Chappell; January 2, 1877; New London, Connecticut, U.S.
- Died: November 25, 1946 (aged 69); Bantam, Connecticut, U.S.
- Other names: Walter E. Traprock; William Hogarth Jr.
- Education: École Nationale Supérieure des Beaux-Arts; Yale University
- Occupation(s): Architect, parodist, author and journalist
- Employer(s): Vanity Fair; Ewing & Chappell
- Spouse: Amy (Wentworth) Chappell
- Honors: American Institute of Architects

George Shepard Chappell, AIA (January 2, 1877 – November 25, 1946) was an American architect, parodist, journalist (with the magazine Vanity Fair) and author. He is known as the author of numerous books, including a travel series parody published under the pseudonym Walter E. Traprock.

== Biography ==
Chappell was born on January 2, 1877, in New London, Connecticut. After attending private schools, he studied at Yale University, where he contributed to campus humor magazine The Yale Record. After graduating in 1899, he went to Paris to train in architecture at the École Nationale Supérieure des Beaux-Arts. The school then promoted classical and European medieval styles.

After getting started in architecture, Chappell also wrote articles for Vanity Fair. Encouraged by friends, he wrote several humorous books during the 1920s and early 1930s. These included a series of travel parodies under the pseudonym of Walter E. Traprock.

He died on November 25, 1946, in Bantam, Connecticut.

== Bibliography ==
Books authored or coauthored by Chappell include:

- 1918 – An Architectural Monograph on Colonial Architecture in Vermont. White Pine Bureau. (With Russell Fenimore.)
- 1920 – High Society: Hints on How to Attain, Relish, and Survive It. G. P. Putnam: New York. (With Dorothy Parker, illustrated by Fish.)
- 1921 – The Cruise of the Kawa: Wanderings in the South Seas. Putnam: New York. (As Walter E. Traprock.)
- 1922 – My Northern Exposure: the Kawa at the Pole. Putnam: New York. (As Walter E. Traprock.)
- 1922 – Rollo in Society: a Guide for Youth. Putnam: New York. (Illustrated by Rockwell Kent as “William Hogarth Jr”.)
- 1923 – Sarah of the Sahara: a Romance of Nomads Land. New York: Putnam/Knickerbocker Press. (As Walter E. Traprock, with staged photographs.)
- 1924 – A Basket of Poses, Albert & Charles Boni: New York. (Illustrated by Rockwell Kent as “William Hogarth Jr”.)
- 1925 – The Restaurants of New York. New York.
- 1926 – The Younger Married Set, Houghton Mifflin: Boston. (Text illustrations by Gluyas Williams.)
- 1930 – Through the Alimentary Canal with Gun and Camera, a Fascinating Trip to the Interior. Stokes: New York. (Illustrated by Otto Soglow.)
- 1930 – The Saloon in the Home, or a Garland of Rumblossoms. Coward-McCann: New York. (With Ridgely Hunt, illustrated by John Held Jr.)
- 1931 – Dr. Traprock's Memory Book; or, Aged in the Wood. Putnam: New York.
- 1931 – The Gardener’s Friend and Other Pests. Stokes: New York. (With Ridgely Hunt, illustrated by H. W. Haenigsen.)
- 1932 – Evil Through the Ages: An Outline in Indecency. Stokes: New York. (Illustrated by Otto Soglow.)
- 1933 – Shoal Water. Putnam: New York.

== See also ==
- Fatu-liva

== Sources ==
- alibris: The Cruise of the Kawa: Wanderings in the South Seas
- Edgar Rice Burroughs Library: Walter E. Traprock
- Katz, Alvin. (31 October 2001). "Humor in the 1920s," Notes of a Used and Out-of-Print Book Dealer, 15,
- Leverenz, Scott. (31 December 2005). Traprock.net: FAQ
