= Hugag =

Mythical creature from American folklore

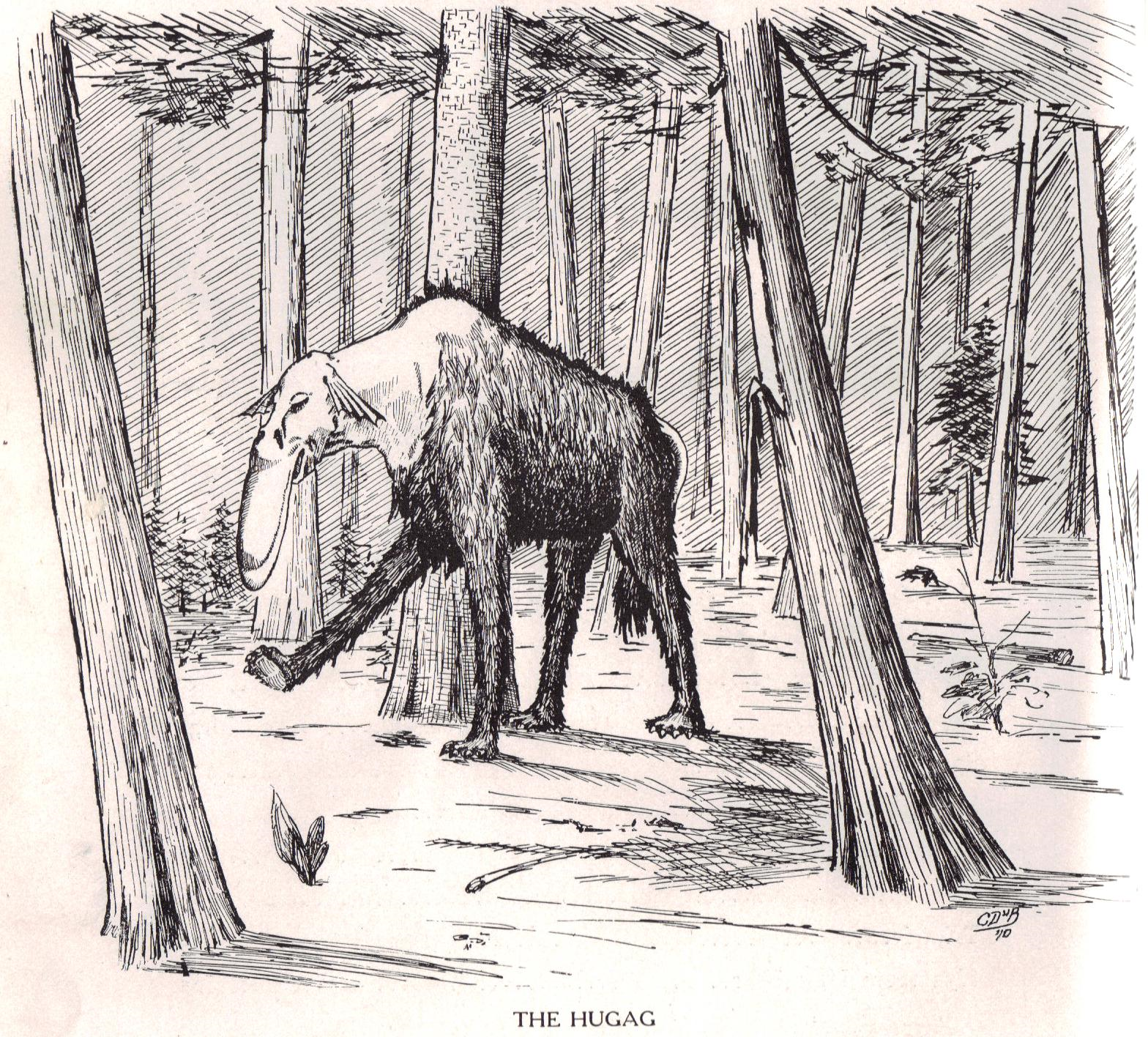
The hugag. Illustration by Coert DuBois from Fearsome Creatures of the Lumberwoods by William T. Cox.

In American folklore, the hugag is a fearsome critter similar to a moose with an extensive upper lip, preventing it from grazing, and jointless legs preventing it from lying down.

== Name usage ==
The word hugag well predates its usage as a term to describe a mythical creature. It appears as a variant spelling of hewgag, a woodwind instrument akin to a kazoo. For example, the June 20, 1846 issue of the American Republican and Baltimore Daily Clipper reads, "My friends and fellow-countrymen—awake, arise! for the Philistines are upon you. Strike the tunjo! blow the hugag! whistle the fife, and chastise the drum! Your lives, your loaves, and liberties are in danger." However, the word also appears in non-English works. The term is referenced in a German text as a transliteration of an Arabic name in 1861. As well, Hugag also appears as a name of a mine located at Republican Mountain, in Colorado, discovered in 1870. The first mention of the hugag to refer to an imaginary animal, while also establishing it as a myth among loggers, is found in the 1900 book In the Limestone Valley: Pen Pictures of Early Days in Western Wisconsin by S.W. Brown. Albeit spelled "hew-gag," the creature, as described by Brown, had round feet surrounded on all sides by claws to conceal its direction of travel. Apart from this, Brown does not offer much detail aside from that the "hew-gag" is not as "ferocious" as other woods beasts.

== Characteristics ==
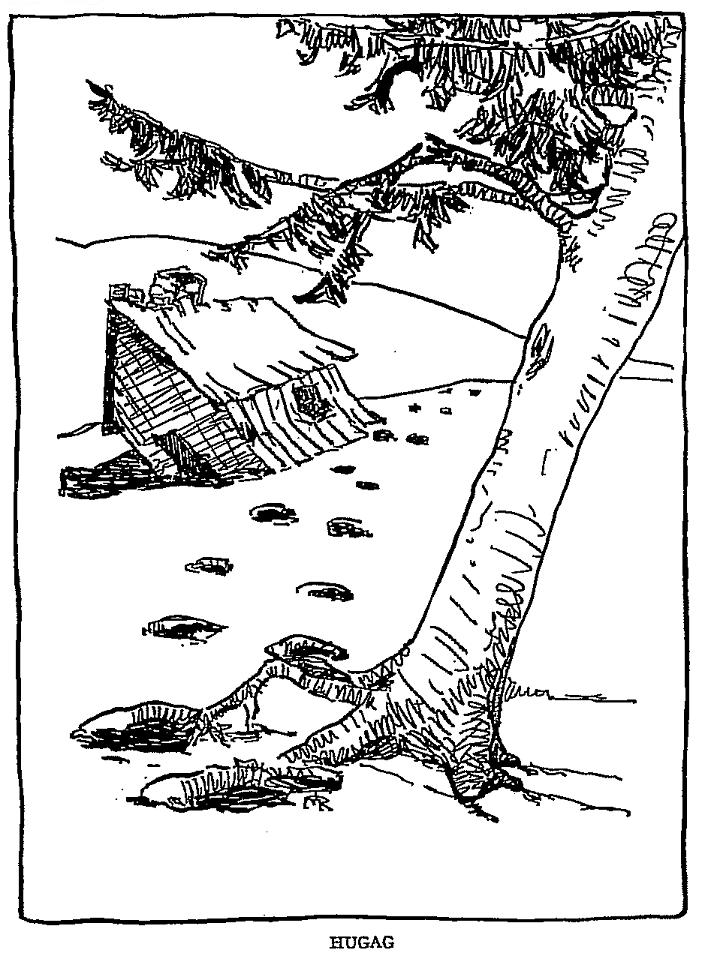
Footprints of the Hugag

The modern conception of the hugag is largely derived from 1910's Fearsome Creatures of the Lumberwoods by William T. Cox. In the book, Cox describes the hugag as an animal, constantly meandering, in size corresponding with the moose and adds "in form it somewhat resembles that animal." Describing its range as northern Minnesota, western Wisconsin and "the Canadian wilds towards Hudson Bay," Cox elaborates:

Very noticeable, however, are its joint-less legs, which compel the animal to remain on its feet, and its long upper lip, which prevents it from grazing. If it tried that method of feeding it would simply tramp its upper lip into the dirt. Its head and neck are leathery and hairless; its strangely corrugated ears flop downward; its four-toed feet, long bushy tail, shaggy coat and general make-up give the beast an unmistakably prehistoric appearance.

Cox adds that the only means the creature has for rest is to brace itself against a tree, in what condition the animal may be captured should notches be made into the wood. Latter accounts, such as Henry H. Tryon's Fearsome Critters and Richard Dorson's Man and Beast in American Comic Legend, are heavily reliant in the details set down in Cox's work. However, Tryon divulges several characteristics independent from Cox's account including: warts on the snout, bumps on the head and pine needles instead of hairs on the body of the hugag. Similarly, whereas Cox's describes the hugag's diet as consisting of twigs or bark, Tryon contends that the hugag subsists on "a steady diet of pine knots makes the pitch ooze constantly from his pores."

== Folkloric parallels ==
Several commentators, such as folklorist Richard Dorson and author Daniel Cohen, highlight that the hugag's inability to lie down mirrors legendary creatures of classic antiquity. Dorson cites an article by Horace Beck, entitled "The Animal that Cannot Lie Down," highlighting that Aristotle opposed the argument that an elephant cannot sit or bends its legs as well that Julius Caesar once reported of an elk that could not lie down. Dorson holds that Cesar's account, in language, closely compares to that of Cox's. Likewise, Daniel Cohen in his 1975 book Monsters, Giants and Little Men from Mars references an account by Pliny the Elder of a creature called the Achlis, which likewise possesses equivalent attributes; albeit, Cohen seemingly confuses the hugag with the analogously named Hodag.

== See also ==
- Achlis
- Dahu
- Fearsome critters
- Folklore of the United States
- Hodag
