= Squonk =

Mythical creature from American folklore

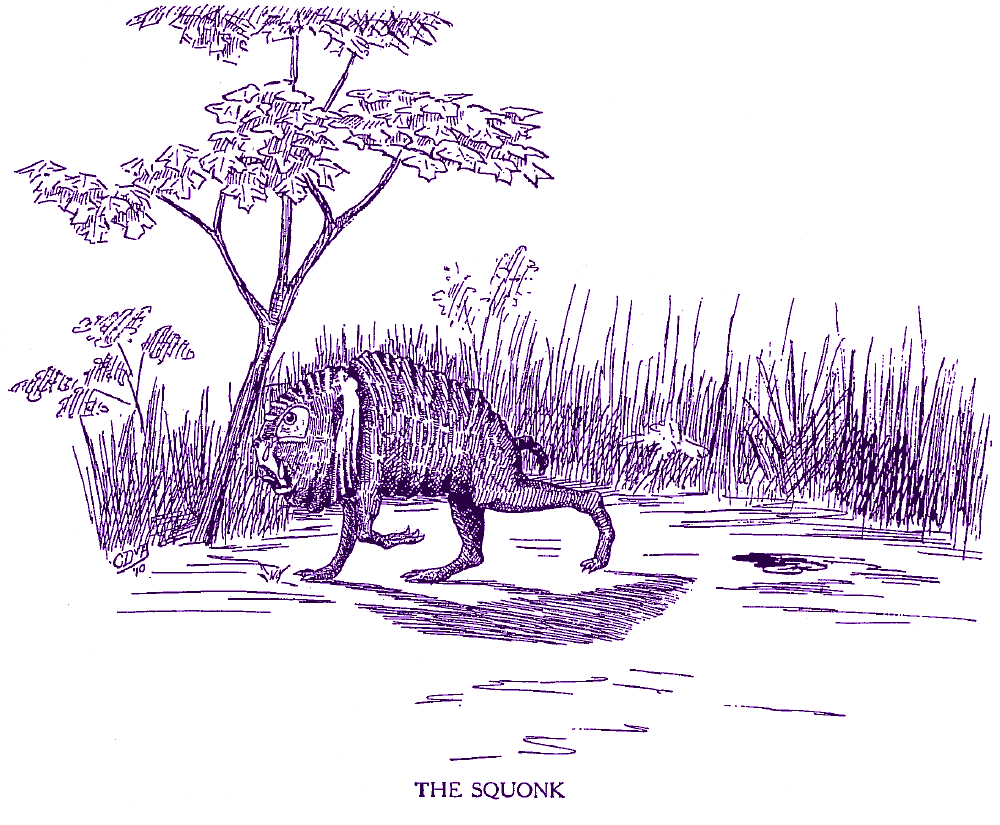
- The squonk illustrated by Coert Du Bois in Fearsome Creatures of the Lumberwoods (1910)

Creature information
- Other name: Lacrimacorpus dissolvens
- Grouping: Fearsome critter
- Folklore: American folklore

Origin
- First attested: 1910
- Country: United States
- Region: Pennsylvania

The squonk is a mythical creature that is reputed to live in the hemlock forests of northern Pennsylvania in the United States.

Johnstown, Pennsylvania, celebrates the Squonk at the Squonkapalooza in August.

== Origins ==
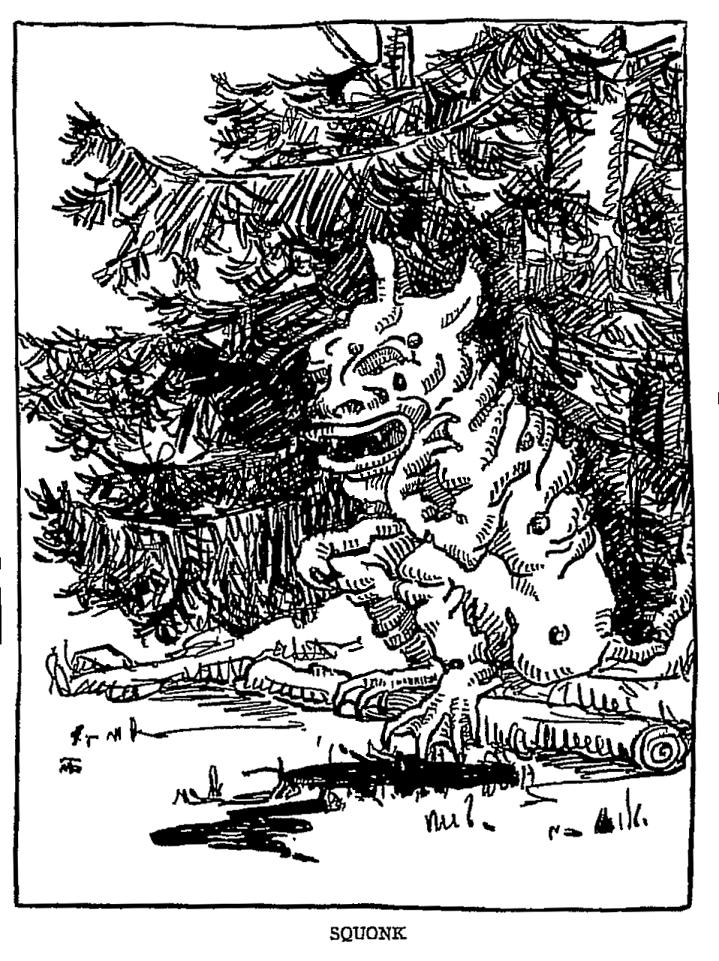
The squonk illustrated by Margaret R. Tryon in Fearsome critters (1939)

The first written account of the squonk was from the 1910 book Fearsome Creatures of the Lumberwoods. Its provenance was described in the next written iteration, in the 1939 book Fearsome Critters. This book suggested that the creatures had migrated from deserts to swamps to finally settle in Pennsylvania. As logging camps were continuously moving in the early 20th century, this could explain their migration to Pennsylvania.

== Appearance and behavior ==
The supposed physical characteristics of the squonk, based on the original written account, are as follows:

The squonk is of a very retiring disposition, generally traveling about at twilight and dusk. Because of its misfitting skin, which is covered with warts and moles, it is always unhappy ... Hunters who are good at tracking are able to follow a squonk by its tear-stained trail, for the animal weeps constantly. When cornered and escape seems impossible, or when surprised and frightened, it may even dissolve itself in tears.

— William T. Cox, "The Squonk", Fearsome Creatures of the Lumberwoods (1910)

Later retellings claimed that squonks are slowest on moonlit nights, as they try to avoid seeing their ugly appearance in any illuminated bodies of water. In addition to warts and moles, the creatures were given webbed toes on their left feet.

The given "species" taxonomy of the creature, Lacrimacorpus dissolvens, is made up of the Latin tear, body, and dissolve. These refer to its supposed ability to dissolve when captured.

== In media ==
- Genesis included the song "Squonk" on A Trick of the Tail in 1976.
- A squonk is used as a monster in the sixth book in the series Dungeon Crawler Carl, The Eye of the Bedlam Bride.
- In season 5, episode 5 of Abbott Elementary, titled "Camping", Jacob tells Barbara about the legend of the squonk to scare her into ending the camping trip.
- Steely Dan mentions the squonk in the song "Any Major Dude Will Tell You" on Pretzel Logic in 1974.
- The United States Postal Service will release a squonk stamp as part of their Mythical Creatures collection in their 2027 releases.

== In scientific literature ==
Some substances are stable in solution or some other "wild" form but cannot be isolated or captured without actually catalyzing their own polymerization or decomposition ("dissolving in their own tears"). For example, a molecule containing a carboxylic acid moiety and an acid labile moiety might be stable when initially prepared as the salt (e.g., barium prephenate) but unstable as the free acid (prephenic acid). These have been named "chemical squonks".
