= Splintercat =

Mythical creature from American folklore

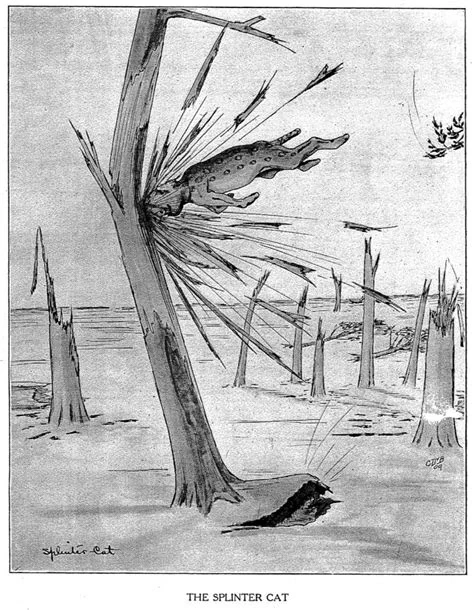
A Splintercat ramming a tree

The splintercat is a legendary fearsome critter in the folklore of the United States.

The splintercat is a nocturnal feline of great ferocity. It flies through the air with terrific speed and when it hits a large tree, it knocks the branches off, withers the trunk, and leaves it standing like a silvery ghost. These dead snags can be seen in many parts of the Pacific Northwest. The splinter cat performs this feat that it is named after to expose raccoons and bees. However, the act of breaking open trees with its head leaves it with a constant headache, which causes it always to be in a foul mood. Accordingly, one is advised to never approach a splintercat.

Splintercat Creek, found in the northern Cascade Range of Oregon, is named after this legendary animal.

The splintercat appears in the 1974 children's book The Last of the Really Great Whangdoodles by Julie Andrews Edwards. This particular splintercat answers to the Prime Minister of Whangdoodland and also enjoys playing cat's cradle.

An alternate version of the splintercat legend comes from Nova Scotia. In this version they come out at night in winter. If you spend time in the woods during the winter you can hear the trees crack from frost expanding. In a quiet wood, this sound is eerie and loud and is said to be a splinter cat emerging from a tree after a long summer hibernation. They are described as having exceptionally long claws and powerful legs. Their fur is patterned and colored similar to the bark of their favourite tree. They are perfectly still and leap on their prey from the shadows.

== Sources ==
- Blegen, Theodore C. (1963). Minnesota, a history of the state. Minneapolis: University of Minnesota Press. LC 63013124.
- Botkin, Benjamin Albert (1998). The American people : stories, legends, tales, traditions, and songs. New Brunswick, N.J.: Transaction Publishers. ISBN 1-56000-984-5.
- Cox, William Thomas (1984). Fearsome creatures of the lumberwoods : with a few desert and mountain beasts. Sacramento: Bishop Publishing. LC 85111981.
- Edwards, Julie Andrews (1974). The Last of the Really Great Whangdoodles. New York: Harper and Row. ISBN 0-06-021805-3.
- Rose, Carol (2000). Giants, monsters, and dragons : an encyclopedia of folklore, legend, and myth. Santa Barbara, Calif.: ABC-CLIO. ISBN 0-87436-988-6.
- "National Wildlife and Conservation Digest: Covering the North American Continent"
