= Gumberoo =

Mythical creature from American folklore

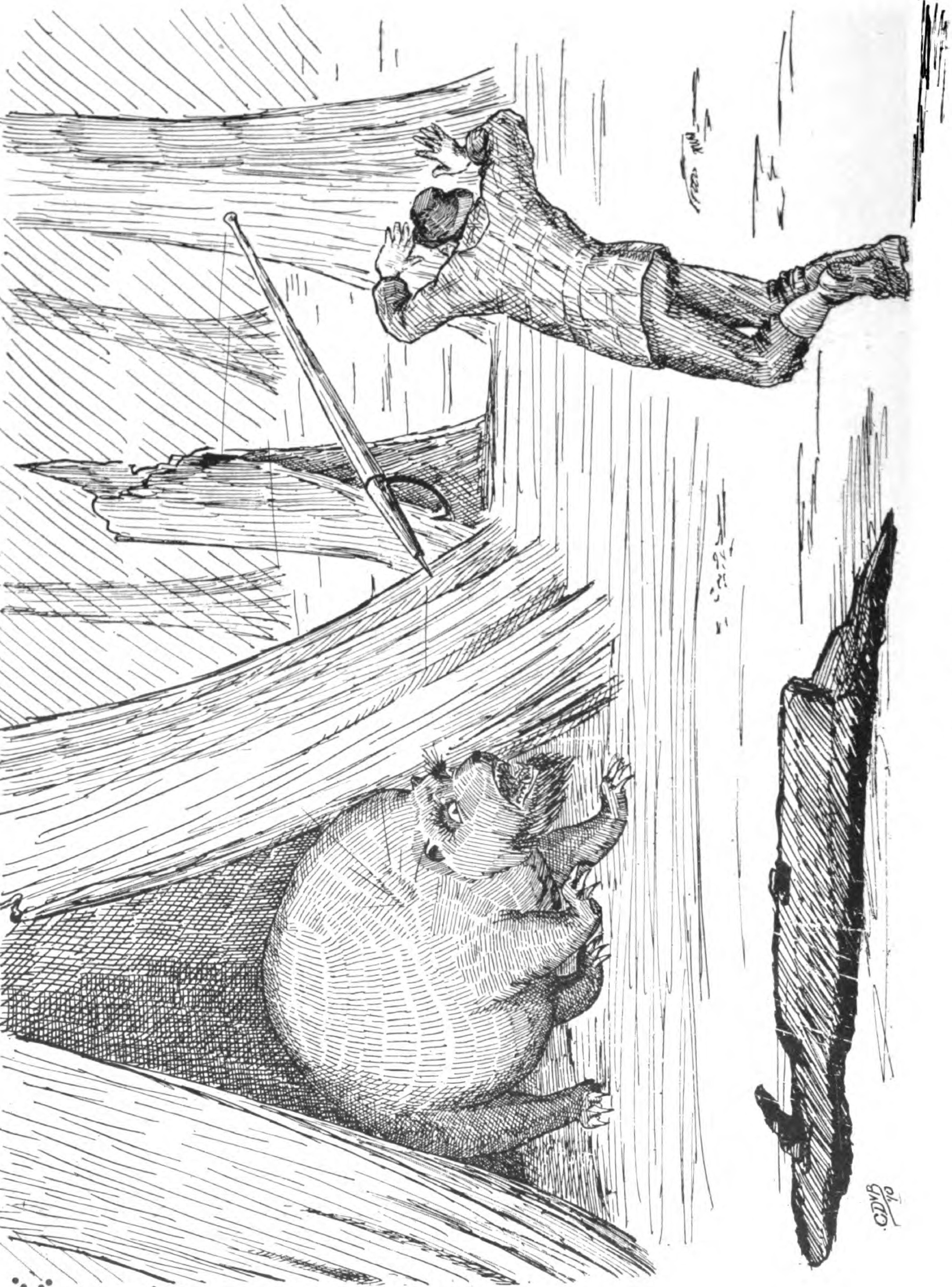
- Illustration by Coert du Bois from Fearsome Creatures of the Lumberwoods (1910)

Creature information
- Grouping: Legendary creature

Origin
- Country: United States
- Details: Forest

In American folklore, the Gumberoo is a fearsome critter with hide so tough that bullets bounce off of it.

== Description ==
The gumberoo was described by early lumberjacks to be larger than a bear with a tough, shiny, black hide that nothing could pierce. The only way to kill it was said to be fire, which caused the creatures to explode. It is said that a man named S. W. Allen once took a picture of a gumberoo but the negative then exploded.
