= Widowmaker (forestry) =

Broken limb that may kill forest workers

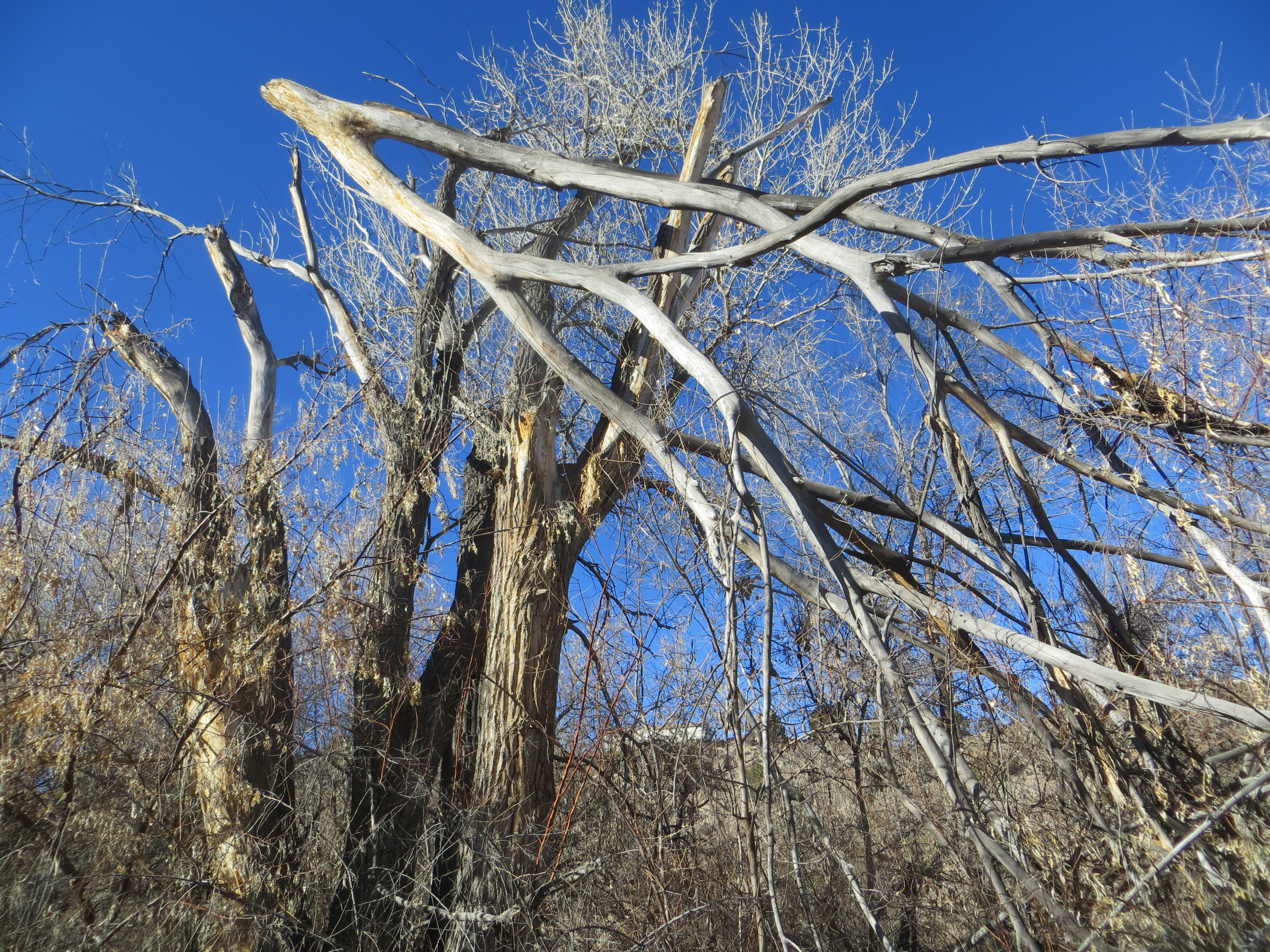
Widowmaker in New Mexico

In forestry, a widowmaker or fool killer is a detached or broken limb or tree top. The name indicates that such objects can kill forest workers by falling on them, thus "making widows" of their spouses. The U.S. Occupational Safety and Health Administration describes widowmakers as "broken off limbs that are hanging freely in the tree to be felled or in the trees close by".

== Etymology ==
The phrase "widow maker" was first applied to eucalyptus trees by early European settlers logging in Australia. If a limb or tree top fell on a logger, their spouse was widowed.

== Causes ==
Widowmakers are often caused by fungal growth over a sustained period. They can also occur with age, as old trees will carry dead wood in their canopies. While this dead wood is usually sturdy enough to not fall on its own, a storm or heavy wind can cause it to fall.

== Hazards ==
Widowmakers may pose a risk to equipment or personnel working under or around the tree. They can become dislodged by wind or during tree felling, and are responsible for 11% of all fatal chainsaw accidents. The U.S. National Institute for Occupational Safety and Health (NIOSH) offers ways to eliminate risks by avoiding working beneath widowmakers, knocking them down, or pulling them down with a machine.

== See also ==
- Snag
