= Belled buzzard =

Legendary creature in American folklore

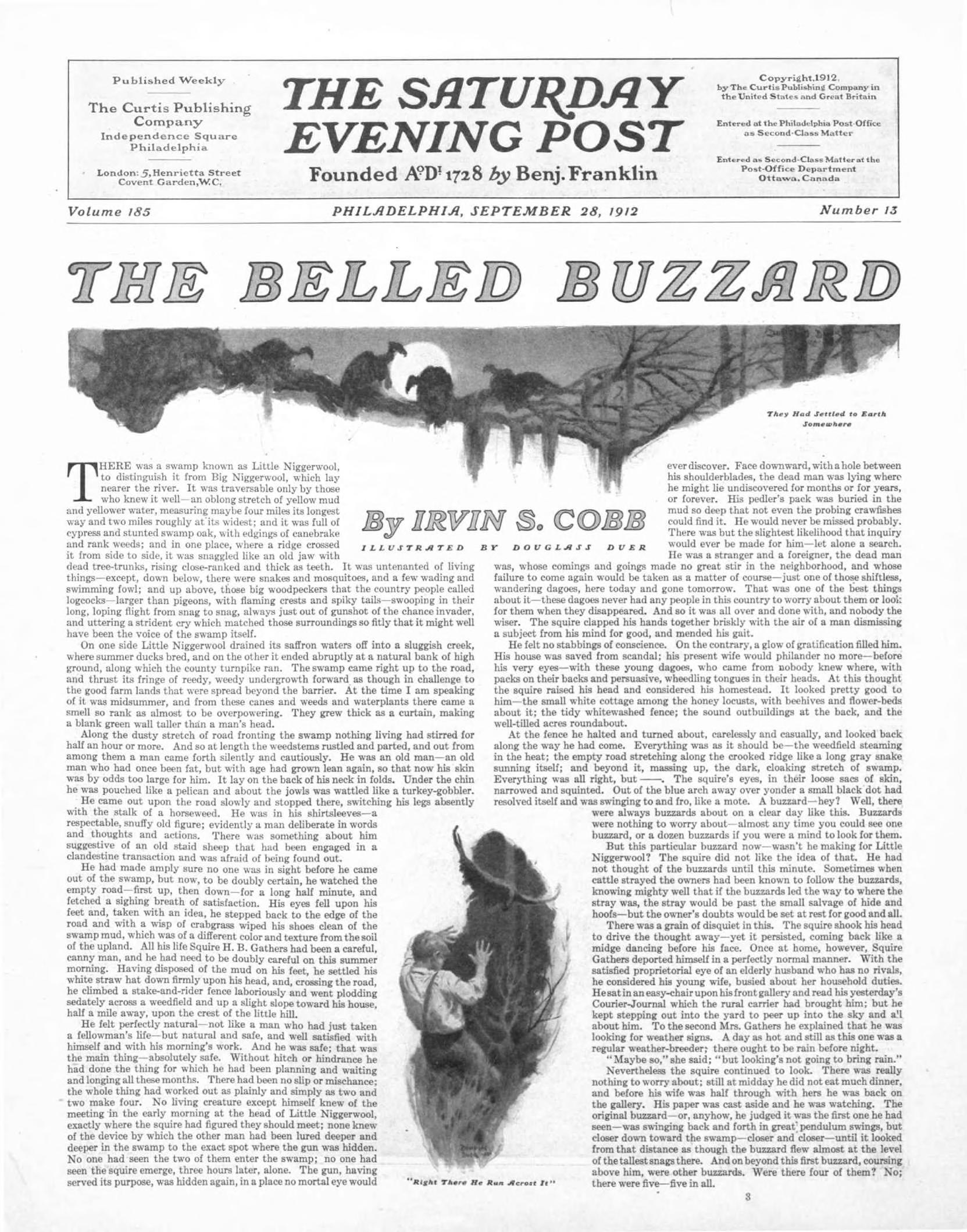
Story of the Belled Buzzard, by Irvin S Cobb, published in the Saturday Evening Post in 1912

The belled buzzard is a fearsome critter in American folklore frequently cited as an omen of disaster by the sounding of its bell. The animal is otherwise depicted as an ordinary buzzard except with a bell affixed to it. The belled buzzard originated from actual accounts of turkey vultures being fastened with cow or sleigh bells. The belief that the belled buzzard was one continuous entity, and not multiple birds, was common, and the creature rose to prominence in the 1880s on through the turn of the twentieth century. Belled buzzard stories circulated principally throughout the Southern United States, and it is the origin of the colloquialism "not enough sense to bell a buzzard."

== Early sightings ==
Reports of buzzards with bells appear as early as the 1850s in the states of Tennessee, North Carolina, and Virginia. While sightings of the belled buzzard were likely drawn from multiple buzzards, eventually, the determiner "the" would become standard largely replacing "a" or plural forms. Prior to the 1880s, the belled buzzard would also be sighted in West Virginia, Delaware, Georgia and South Carolina. However, it would be the belled buzzard's appearance in Brownsville, Tennessee during the yellow fever epidemic of 1878 that first connected the animal with a natural disaster. While earlier reports focused on sporadic occurrences, the Brownsville case was the first to become widely cited. It was from then on that the belled buzzard legend grew to take on a more ominous tone.

== Prominence ==
Following the Brownsville case, sightings of the belled buzzard in the 1880s would rise exponentially. By 1885, the belled buzzard's range would expand to include the states of Maryland, Ohio, Kentucky, Mississippi, Texas, and New York. While most reports simply made mention of a sighting, those that elaborated further reinforced the belled buzzard's reputation as a harbinger of doom. Headings such as "A Bird of Evil Omen," "Disaster Feared with Coming of Belled Buzzard" or other comparable titles readily attested to the belled buzzard as a precursor to calamity. The content of the articles were no less explicit on this point. A reference by the Delaware Ledger openly related "We most sincerely hope that the bell-buzzard, that has been so frequently spoken of our exchange, will not locate in this section. It might be the forerunner of cholera," whereas a Nebraskan paper simply noted, "A BUZZARD with a bell on its neck is frightening people in Maryland. They take it to be the Angel of Death."

== Claimants ==
Claims regarding either the belling, capture or death of the belled buzzard were not uncommon. Given the varying descriptions of bells, fasteners used and buzzards, themselves, it is sensible to conclude that these reports referenced different belled buzzards. However, neither the presence of other claimants nor continued reports of sightings brought forth an end to such claims. An early report of a buzzard having been belled out of Missouri was made in 1881 despite the lack of belled buzzard sightings reported in that state at the time. Again, an article from May 5, 1900 purported that three Georgia veterans, J. L. Jarrell, H. C. Davis, and G. K. Smith, while stationed in Tallahassee, Florida, belled a buzzard in 1863. The article elaborated that a buzzard captured at Ft. Gains, Georgia was speculated to be the same bird due to the alleged similarities in the bronze bell and leather collar used. Still the dating of the purported belling would have been nearly a decade after the first belled buzzard sightings in the 1850s. If, in fact, the claim was legitimate, the bird captured certainly would not have been the original belled buzzard. Even more elaborate, was an article entitled "Aged Buzzard Thought Dead" by the Warren Sheaf that not only claimed that the belled buzzard was thought to have died after escaping entanglement from its leather strap, which a sleigh bell had been affixed, but added that the belled buzzard had been belled during the War of 1812 and was "present at every big engagement since then." Notwithstanding, the article further purported that the belled buzzard had been sighted as far south as Peru.

== See also ==
- Fearsome critters
- Folklore of the United States
- Mothman, a man-sized bird reportedly seen in West Virginia.
- Banshee, a creature in Irish folklore that heralds death by wailing or shrieking.
