= Glawackus =

Mythical creature from American folklore

The glawackus is one of the fearsome critters, a group of legendary creatures in the folklore and traditions of lumberjacks during the 19th and early 20th centuries in North America. The glawackus is described as looking something between a bear, a panther, and a lion. The glawackus is also known as the northern devil cat. It is known for its fearsome screech that compares to the cackle of a hyena. The creature is blind and uses its sense of smell as well as sound waves. Looking into the creature's eyes is said to wipe the victim's memory. It was seen in 1939 in Glastonbury, Connecticut.

== Sightings of the creature ==
Lowell Thomas, a radio network commentator, who was popular nationwide, reported the glawackus had been named by a "Connecticut scientist."

A safari was organized with two Ozark-trained hounds. The search came back empty-handed. The event, however, was memorialized in verse:

"Say did the fearless hunters / Pick up the beastly spoor / While trekking through the jungle / With steps alert and sure?"

== See also ==
- Phantom cat
