= Fearsome critters =

Tall tale animals from North American folklore

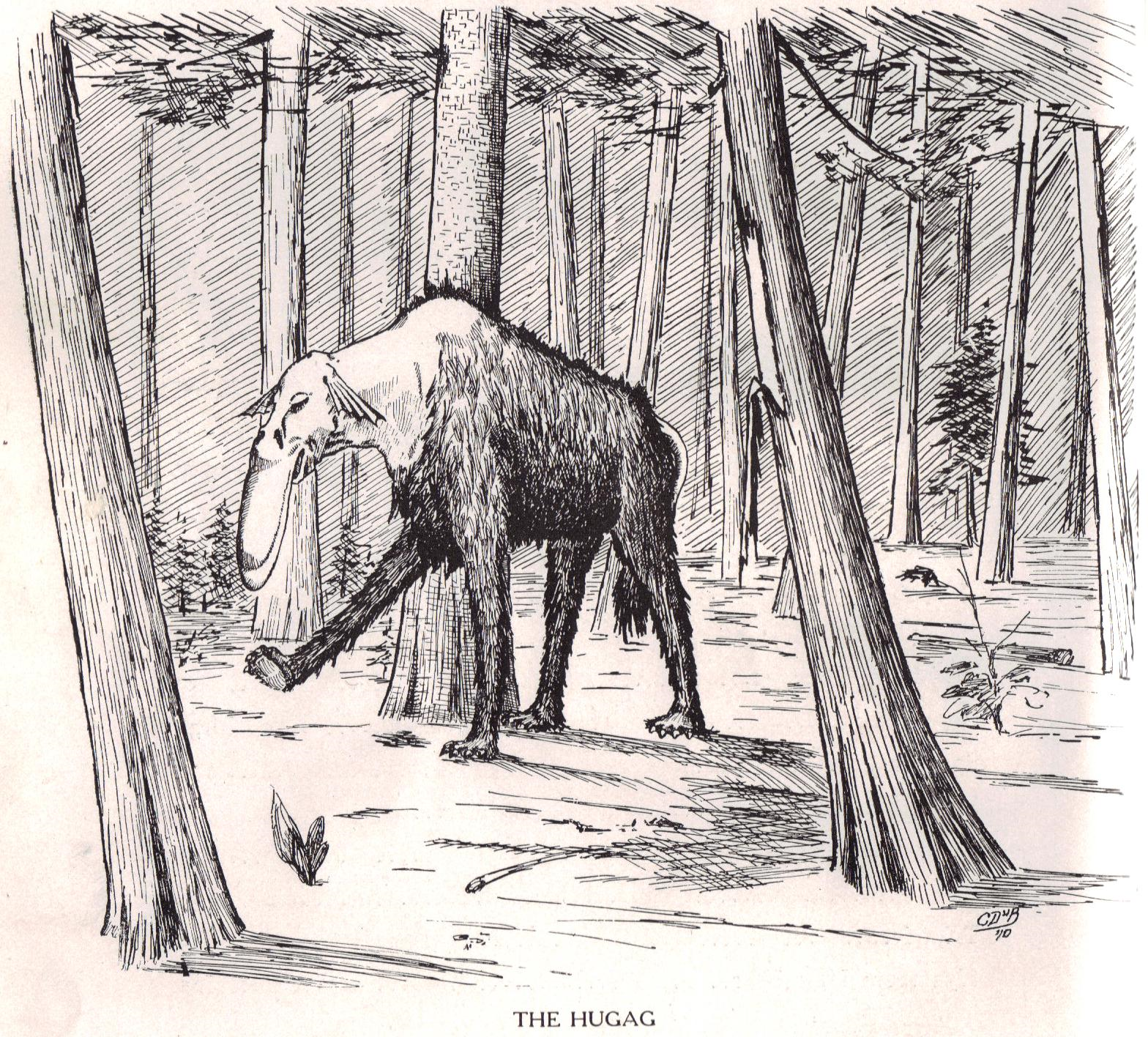
The hugag, a typical fearsome critter. Illustration by Coert DuBois from Fearsome Creatures of the Lumberwoods by William T. Cox.

In North American folklore and American mythology, fearsome critters were tall tale animals said to inhabit the wilderness in or around logging camps, especially in the Great Lakes region. Today, the term may also be applied to similar fabulous beasts.

== Origins ==
Fearsome critters were an integral part of oral tradition in North American logging camps during the turn of the twentieth century, principally as a means to pass time (such as in tall tales) or as a jest for hazing newcomers. In a typical fearsome critter gag, a person would casually remark about a strange noise or sight they encountered in the wild, and another accomplice would join in with a similar anecdote. Meanwhile, an eavesdropper would begin to investigate, as Henry H. Tryon recorded in his book, Fearsome Critters (1939) —

Sam would lead with a colorful bit of description, and Walter would follow suit with an arresting spot of personal experience, every detail being set forth with the utmost solemnity, and with exactly the correct degree of emphasis. At the end, so deftly had the cards been played that the listener was completely convinced of the animal's existence. This method of presentation is widely used. For the best results, two narrators who can "keep the ball in the air" are necessary, and perhaps an occasional general question is tossed to someone in the audience, such inquiries being invariably accorded a grave, corroborative nod.

Lumberjacks, who regularly traveled between camps, would stop to swap stories, which eventually disseminated these myths across the continent. Many fearsome critters were simply the products of pure exaggeration; however, a number were used either jokingly or seriously as explanations for both unexplained and natural phenomena. For example, the hidebehind served to account for loggers who failed to return to camp, while the treesqueak offered justification for strange noises heard in the woods. A handful, intentionally or not, mirrored descriptions of actual animals. The mangrove killifish, which takes up shelter in decaying branches after leaving the water, exhibits similarities to the upland trout, a legendary fish purported to nest in trees. In addition, the story of the fillyloo, about a mythical crane that flies upside-down, may have been inspired by observations of the wood stork, a bird that has been witnessed briefly flying in this manner. In particular instances more elaborate ruses were created using taxidermy or trick photography.

== Attributes ==
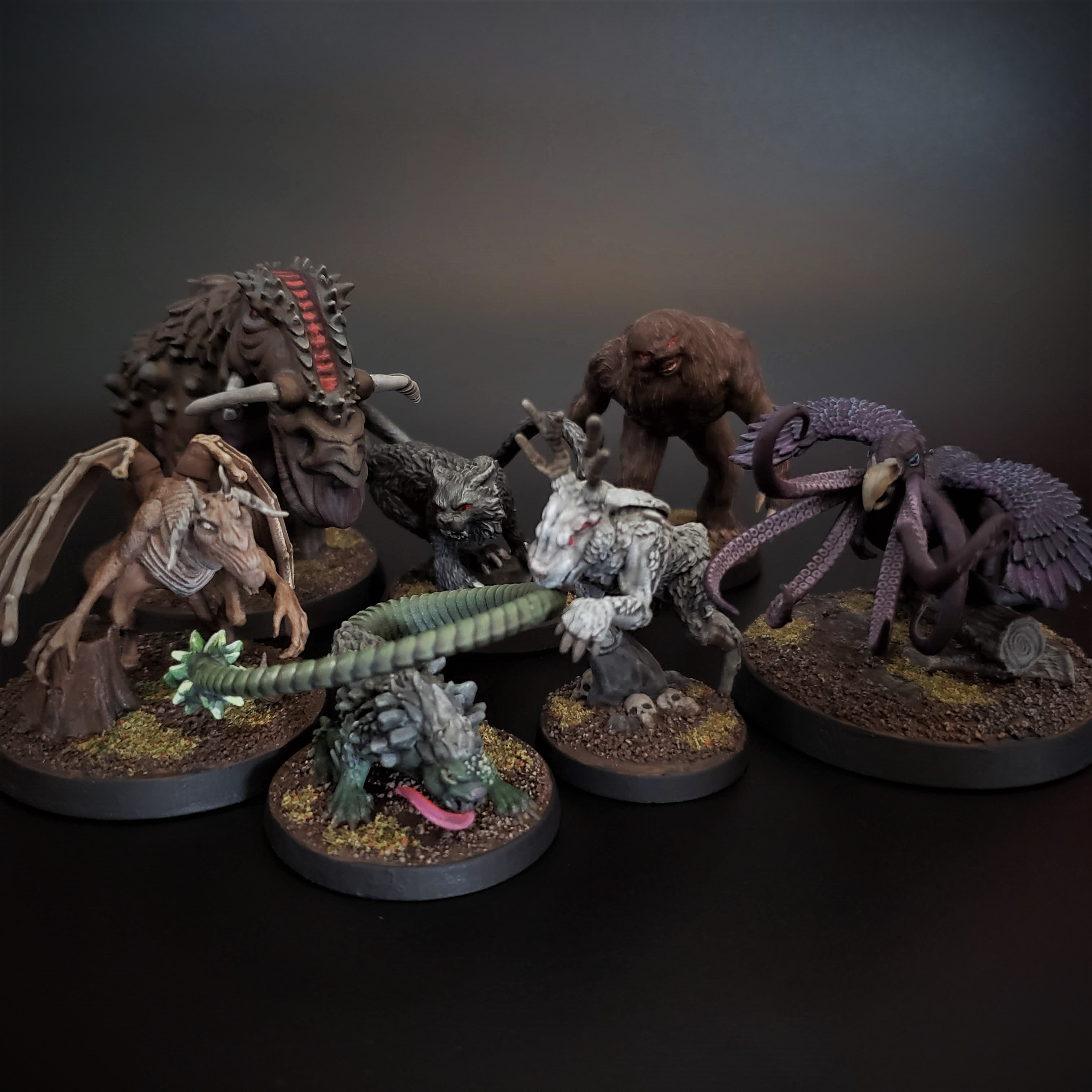
Game miniatures depicting various fearsome critters (from the board game Fearsome Wilderness)

The appearance of the fearsome critters themselves were usually more comical than frightful. Often the greater emphasis is placed on behavioral traits with little or no detail mentioned on their appearance, as in the cases of the hidebehind, teakettler, squidgicum-squee, and hangdown. Some fearsome critters like flittericks or the Goofus bird appeared to be ordinary animals that just behaved out of the ordinary. The more physically emphasized and improbable creatures seem to be distinguished by how far the storyteller could push the boundaries of biomechanics. Both the tripodero and snoligoster demonstrate facets more in common with mechanical apparatuses than animals, and the hugag and sidehill gouger seem to be more a play on applied physics than fanciful inspiration. While much of the literature that has been written on the subject echoes a naturalist's perspective, commonly specifying a range of distribution, behavioral habits, and physical appearance, many of these myths were never as widespread as others. Consequently, it is common to find a lack of consensus on a specific fearsome critter, if not clear contradictions. To illustrate, the wampus cat differs widely in appearance depending on region. For instance, in Henry H. Tryon's Fearsome Critters, the wampus cat is described as having pantographic forelimbs while in Vance Randolph's We Always Lie to Strangers, it is portrayed as a supernatural, aquatic panther.

The tendency to description of behavior without image is used to eerie literary effect by Manly Wade Wellman in employing a number of fearsome critters in his 1952 science fiction folk tale "The Desrick on Yandro," as well as commenting specifically on the lack of physical description for one of the beasts: "The Behinder flung itself on his shoulders. Then I knew why nobody's supposed to see one. I wish I hadn't. To this day I can see it, as plain as a fence at noon, and forever I will be able to see it. But talking about it's another matter. Thank you, I won't try."

== Firsthand accounts ==
In his 1939 book, Fearsome Critters, Henry H. Tryon recounted that "... much true folk-lore was born, lived and died with no chance of ever becoming a part of our permanent records. Without doubt this has happened to a good bit of woods lore." Consequently, firsthand records on fearsome critters are few in number. However, among some of the more significant sources to record fearsome critter stories directly from loggers, hunters and other forest tradesmen, listed chronologically, are:

- Fearsome Creatures of the Lumberwoods, With a Few Desert and Mountain Beasts, by William T. Cox (Washington, D.C.: Judd & Detweiler Inc., 1910)
- Fearsome Critters, by Henry H. Tryon (Cornwall, NY: Idlewild Press, 1939)
- The Hodag and Other Tales of the Logging Camps, by Lakeshore Kearney (Madison, WI: Democrat Printing Company, 1928)
- Paul Bunyan Natural History, by Charles E. Brown (Madison, WI: self-published, 1935)
- We Always Lie to Strangers, by Vance Randolph (New York: Columbia University Press, 1951)
- Mythical Creatures of the USA and Canada, by Walker D. Wyman (River Falls, WI: Univ of Wisconsin Riverfalls Press, 1978)

Additionally, in 1922 and 1925, veteran guide Art Childs published an illustrated newspaper column entitled, Yarns of the Big Woods that featured fearsome critters from oral traditions. Additionally, many of the aforementioned texts has since been made freely available online, yet others are still under copyright.

== List ==
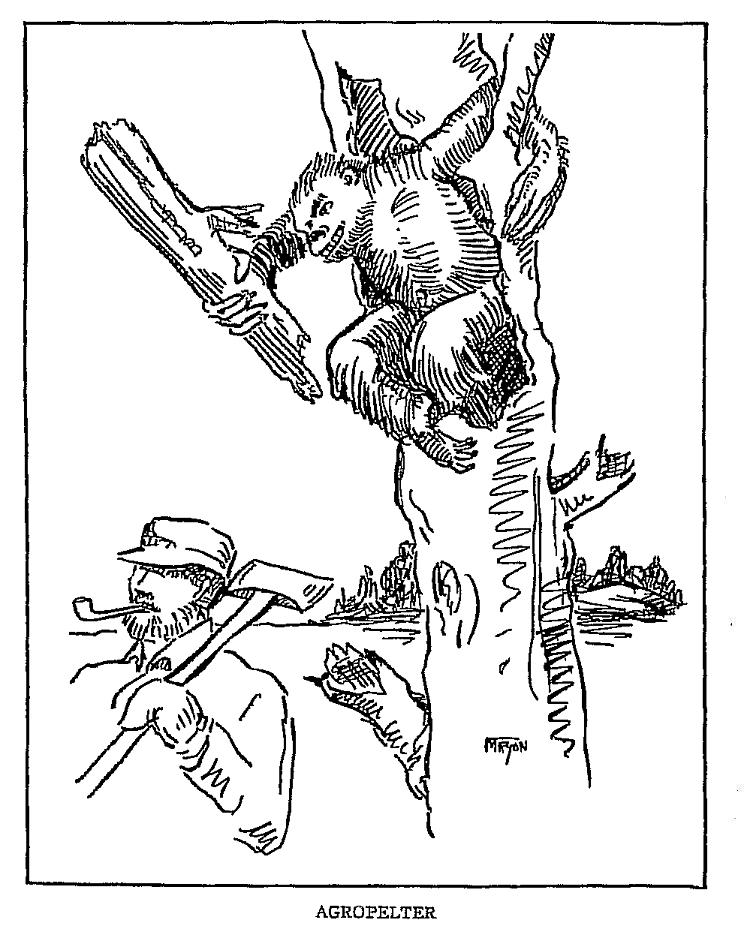
Agropelter

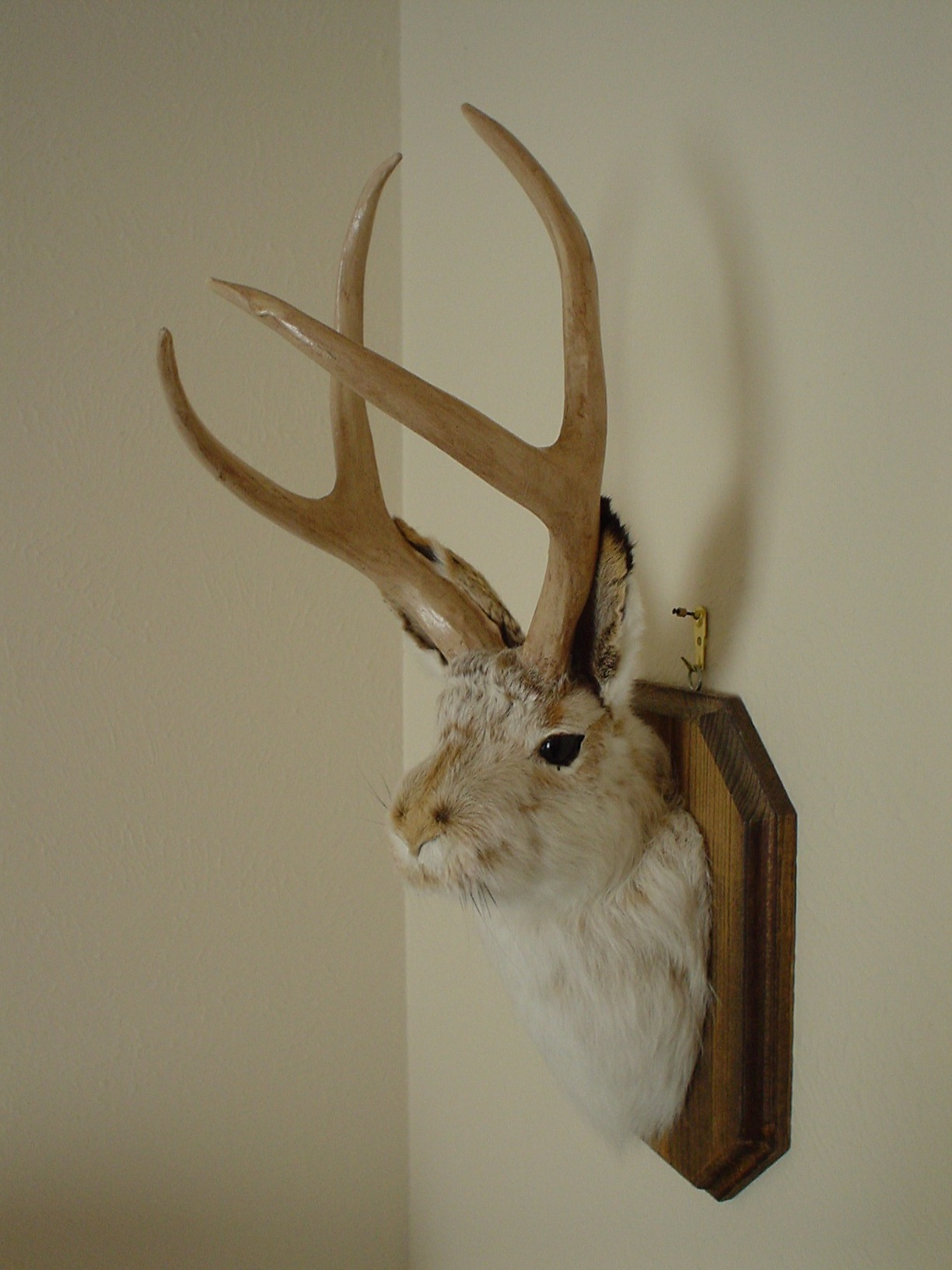
Jackalope

=== Mammals ===
- Agropelter, a beast that amuses itself by hurling twigs and tree branches at passersby.
- Axehandle hound, a beast that reputedly subsists on axe-handles left unattended, mentioned in Jorge Luis Borges' Book of Imaginary Beings.
- Ball-tailed cat, a feline similar to a mountain lion, except with a long tail with a bulbous end used for striking its prey.
- Bigfoot is an alleged ape/human-like hybrid creature of North American folklore.
- Cactus cat, a feline of the American Southwest with hair-like thorns that intoxicates itself by the consumption of cactus water.
- Dungavenhooter, a crocodile creature with no mouth and huge nostrils. The creature uses its tail to pound loggers into a gaseous vapor, which it then inhales for sustenance.
- Glawackus, an animal resembling a mixture of a lion, boar, or bear.
- Gumberoo, a rare, hairless bear-like creature with nearly invulnerable skin. The animal's hide repels anything fired at it. Fire causes the gumberoo to combust in a massive explosion.
- Hidebehind, an animal that seizes loggers and devours them. The animal was said to be so swift that it could hide behind the nearest tree before being seen.
- Hodag, a creature of the Wisconsin swamps possessing horns and spines.
- Hugag, an animal similar to a moose, with stiff, jointless legs preventing it from lying down and a large upper lip preventing it from grazing.
- Jackalope, a jackrabbit with the antlers of an antelope or deer.
- Jersey Devil, a predatory creature that inhabits the pine forests of Southern New Jersey. The creature is often described as winged and bipedal, and sometimes connected to witchcraft and devil worship.
- Sidehill gouger, an animal having legs on one side taller than the other, thus always having to travel on hillsides.

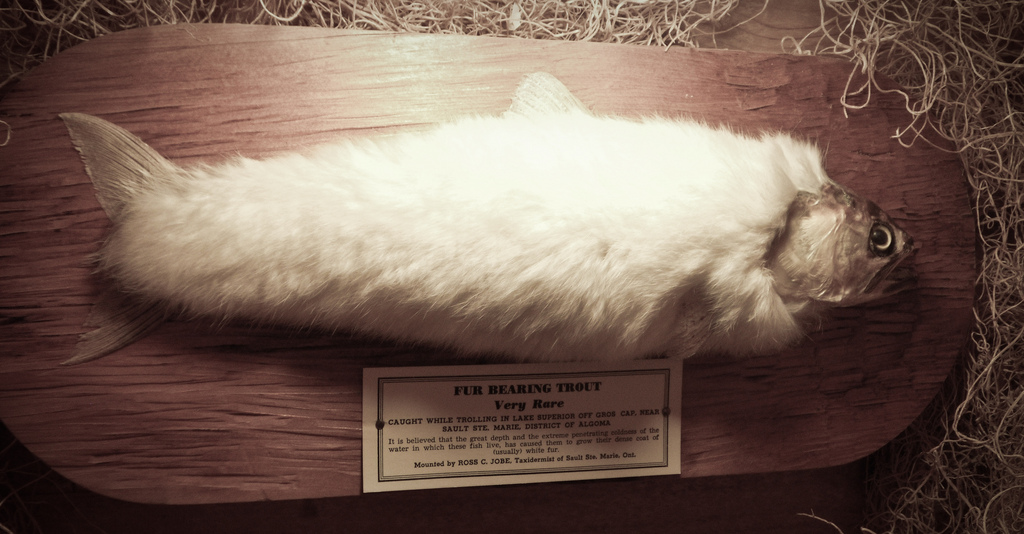
Fur-bearing trout

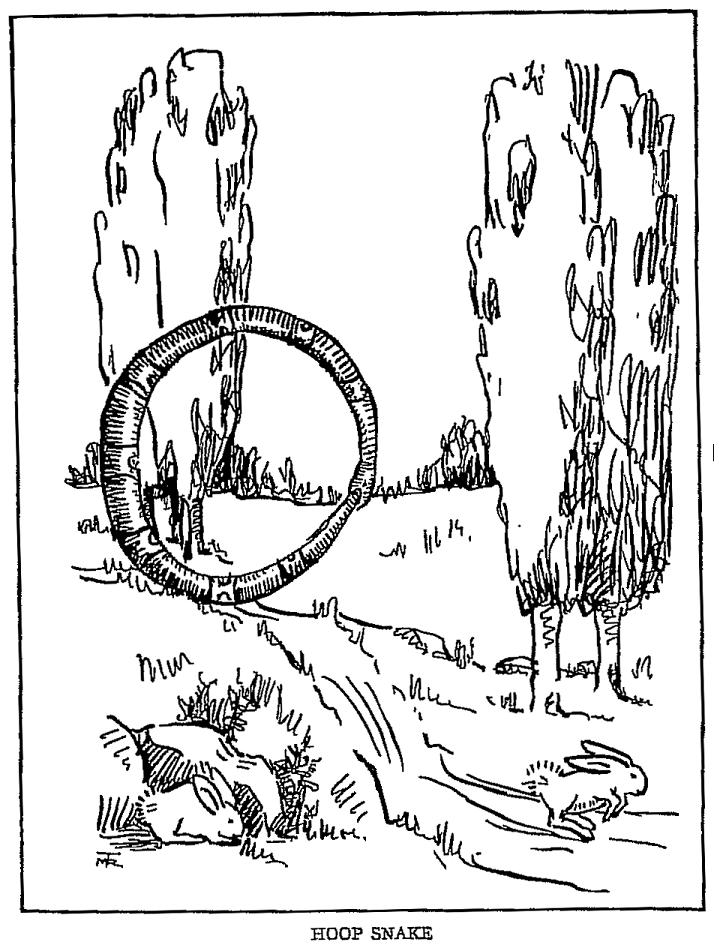
Hoop snake

- Splintercat, a legendary cat of the Pacific Northwest that uses its incredible speed and stiff forehead to smash into large trees, knocking the branches off and withering the trunks.
- Squonk, an animal which, saddened by its deformed countenance, cries incessantly and even dissolves into tears if seen.
- Teakettler, a small variety of vermin that makes a noise like a teakettle.
- Wampus cat, a large phantom panther that varies widely in appearance.

=== Birds ===
- Belled buzzard, a vulture with a bell affixed to it, the ringing of which is cited as an omen of disaster.
- Gillygaloo bird, a bird that lays square eggs, so they do not roll.
- Goofus bird, a backwards-flying bird that builds its nest upside down.

=== Fish ===
- Fur-bearing trout, a species of trout that grows a thick fur coat for warmth in cold climates.

=== Serpents ===
- Hoop snake, a snake that bites its tail to enable it to roll like a wheel.
- Joint snake, a snake that can reassemble itself after being cut to pieces or break apart when hit with something.
- Snallygaster, a bird/reptile-like hybrid beast said to inhabit the hills surrounding Washington and Frederick Counties of Maryland.
- Snow snake, a snake that is active only during winter months.

== See also ==
- Lists of legendary creatures
- Paul Bunyan
- William T. Cox
- Drop bear
- Snipe hunt
- Cryptozoology

== Sources ==
- Boatright, Mody C. (1934). Tall Tales from Texas Cow Camps. Dallas, Texas: The Southwest Press.
- Botkin, B.A., ed. (1955). A Treasury of American Folklore. New York, NY: Crown Publishers.
- The American People: Stories, Legends, Tales, Traditions, and Songs. New Jersey: Transaction Publishers. 1977.
- Davidson, Levette Jay; Blake, Forrester, eds. (1947). Rocky Mountain Tales. Tulsa, Oklahoma: University of Oklahoma Press.
- Leach, Maria, ed. (1972). Funk & Wagnall's Standard Dictionary of Folklore, Mythology and Legend. New York, NY: Harper & Row.
- MacDougall, Curtis D. (1958). Hoaxes. New York, NY: Dover Publications, Inc.
- Cohen, Daniel (1975). Monsters, Giants, and Little Men from Mars: An Unnatural History of the Americas. New York, NY: Doubleday.
