= Ball-tailed cat =

Mythical creature from American folklore

Creature information
- Other name(s): Sliver cat Dingmaul; Felis caudaglobosa
- Grouping: Legendary creature
- Sub grouping: Fearsome critter
- Folklore: American folklore

Origin
- Country: United States

The ball-tailed cat (Felis caudaglobosa) is a fearsome critter of North American folklore most commonly described as having similar traits to that of a mountain lion, except with an exceedingly long tail to which there is affixed a solid, bulbous mass for striking its prey. Tales of ball-tailed cats were common among woodsmen during the turn of the 20th century and many variations exist; two of the more prominent variants are the Dingmaul and the Sliver Cat. The latter is distinguishable for not only having a smooth-sided ball for knocking wayfarers unconscious, but in addition a spiked-side for piercing and grappling its victims. The earliest written mention of the ball-tailed cat appears in Henry Tyron's Fearsome Critters (1939).

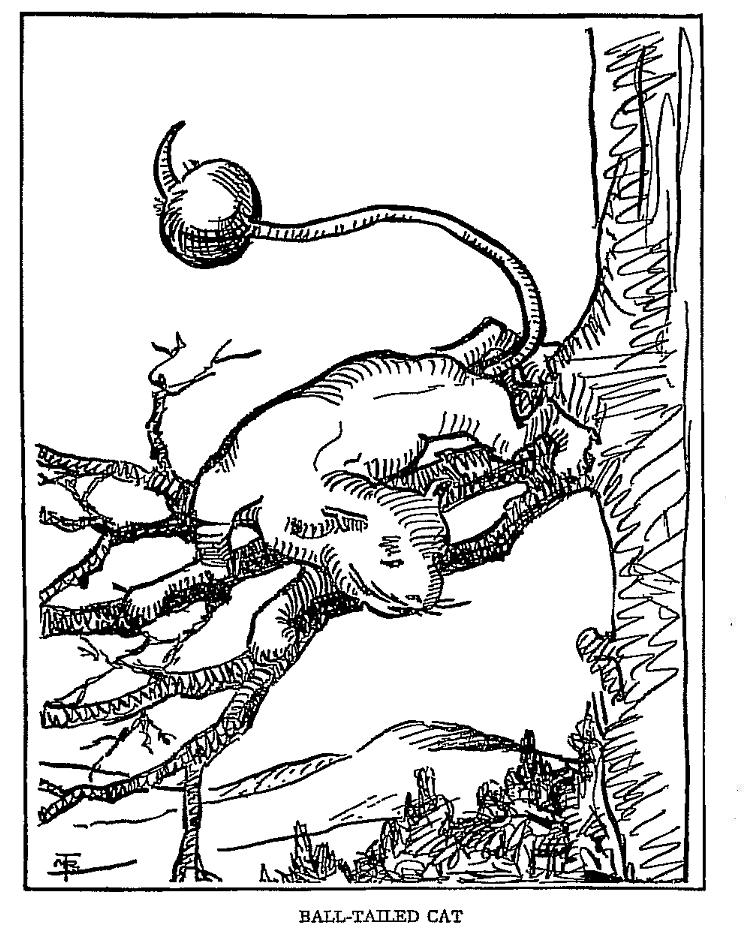
Ball-tailed cat

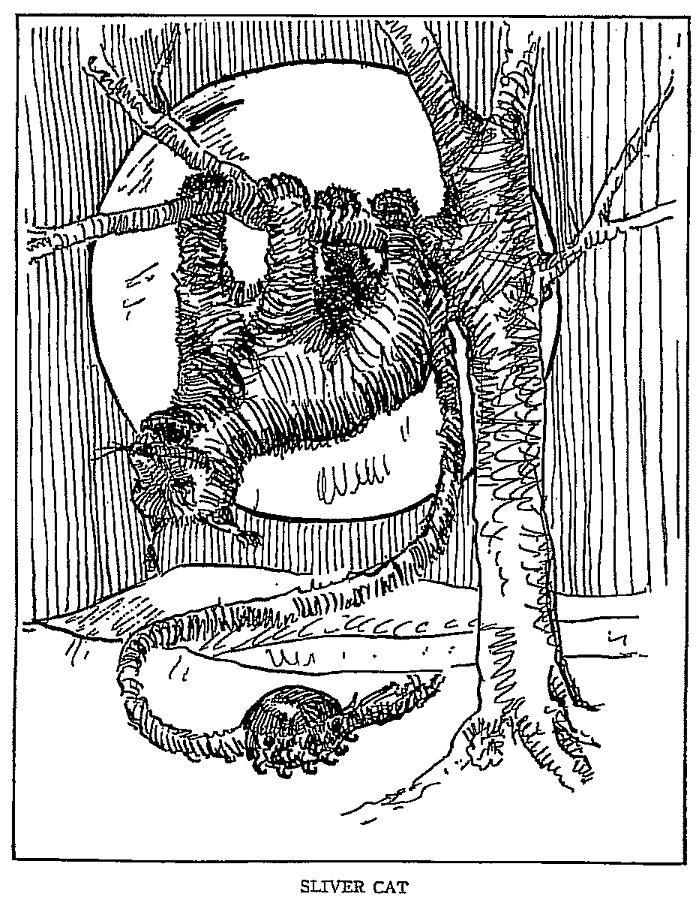
Sliver Cat

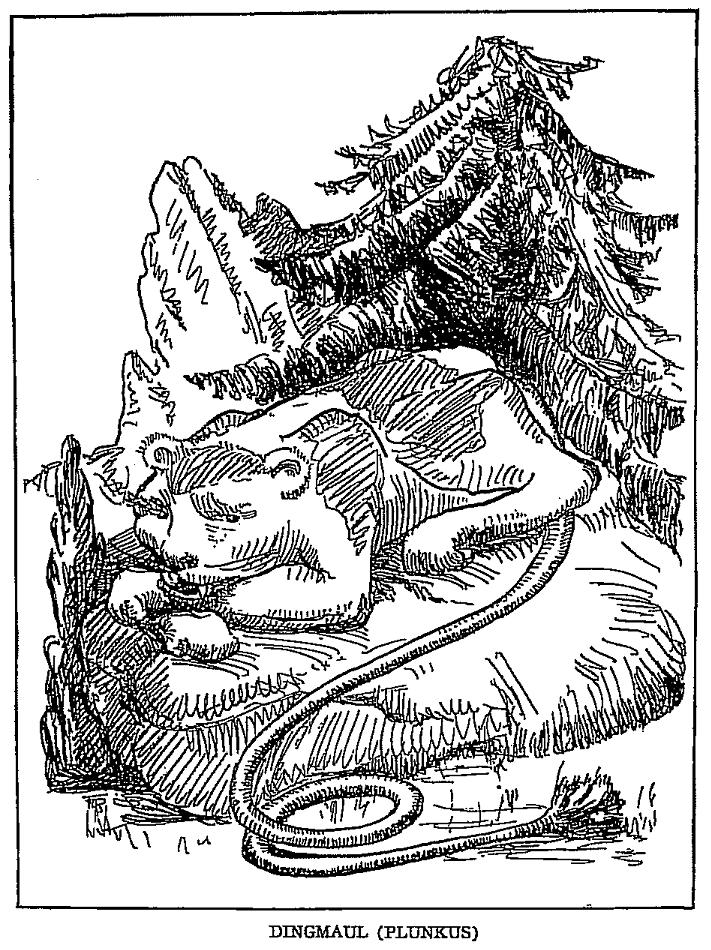
Dingmaul

== See also ==
- Ankylosaurus, which used a club on its tail for defense
