= Agropelter =

Mythical creature from American folklore

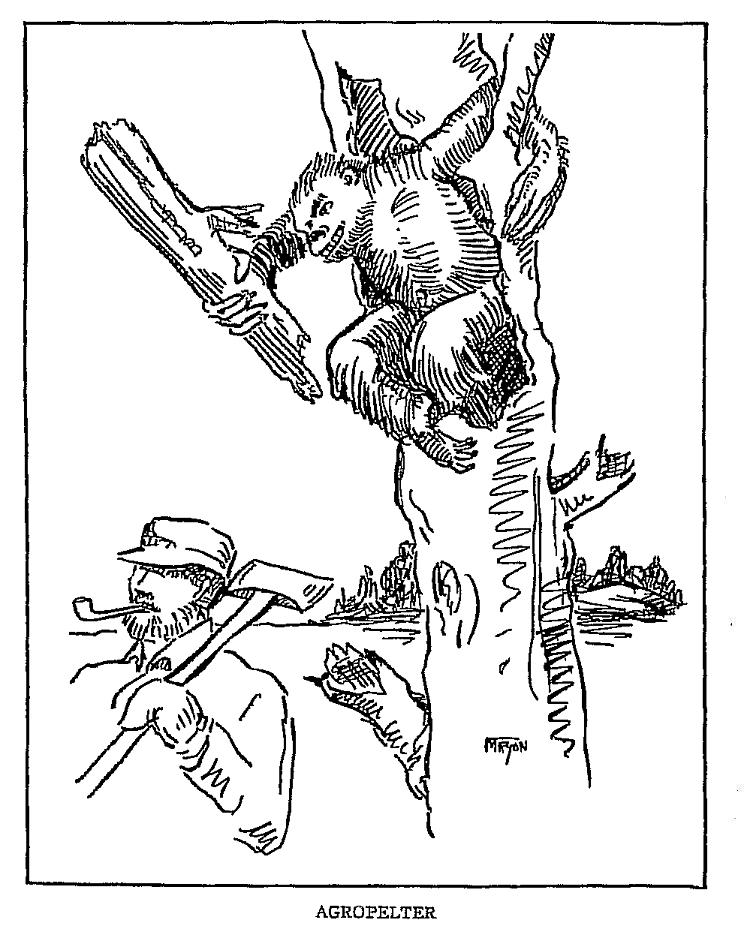

The Agropelter (given the mock-taxonomic designation Anthrocephalus craniofractens) is a mythical fearsome critter said to inhabit hollow trees of the conifer woods from Maine to Oregon. From this vantage point, the creature would await an unwary person and hurl wooden splinters and branches at the intruder. Some have described the creature as being so quick that it has never been seen. One reference describes the creature as having a "slender, wirely body, the villainous face of an ape, and arms like muscular whiplashes, with which it can snap off dead branches and hurl them through the air like shells from a six inch gun."

The agropelter subsists on woodpeckers, hoot owls, high-holes, and dozy (rotten) wood. Its pups are born on February 29 and always arrive in odd numbers. They are blamed for the disappearance of people in northern forests. When loggers died from branches falling on their heads, the agropelter was blamed for throwing the heavy branches. Another reference describes the creature as having "the head of a gorilla or some other terrifying ape, but fully furred, and its body was like that of a stretched-out, starving bear." They are also said to be "completely black save for its face, which had a spoken ash-grey skull pattern contrasting with the black of the rest of the animal".

In one account, an agropelter kidnapped a pioneer surveyor and fed him raw fish until he escaped.

Torrey Peters' story Stag Dance in the book of the same name features an agropelter.
