= Hidebehind =

Mythical creature from American folklore

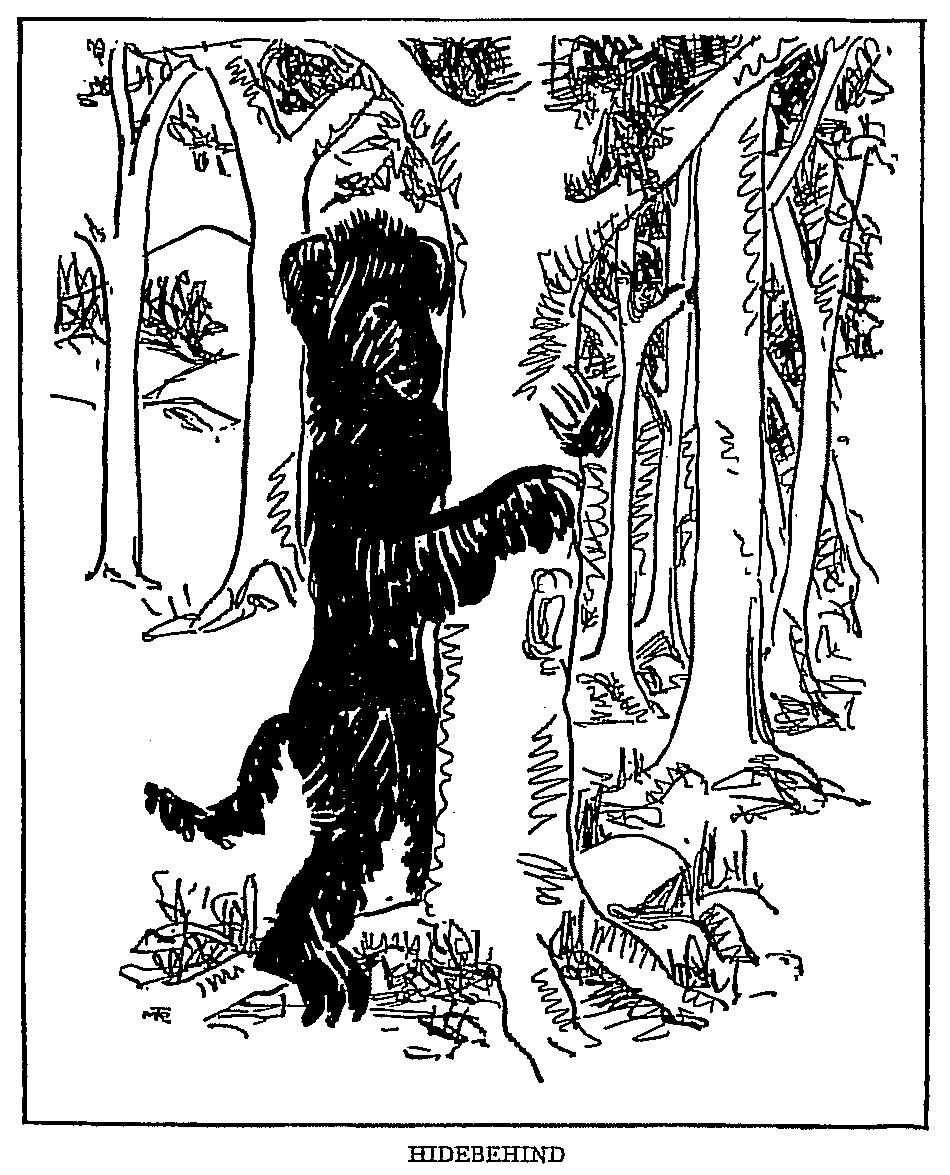
- The hidebehind from Fearsome Critters (1939)

Creature information
- Grouping: Legendary creature

Origin
- Country: United States
- Habitat: Forests and woodlands

The hidebehind is a nocturnal fearsome critter from American folklore that preys upon humans that wander the woods, which was blamed for the disappearances of early loggers when they failed to return to camp. The hidebehind is said to be able to conceal itself: when an observer attempts to look directly at it, the creature quickly hides behind an object or behind the observer and therefore cannot be directly seen.

The hidebehind supposedly uses this ability to stalk human prey without being observed and to attack them without warning. Said victims, including lumberjacks and others who frequent the forests, are then dragged back to the creature's lair to be devoured. The creature is said to subsist chiefly upon the intestines of its victim and has a severe aversion to alcohol, which is therefore considered a sufficient repellent. Other sources suggest that the hidebehind makes hissing noises, such as a viper would.

Tales of the hidebehind may have been used as an explanation of strange noises in the forest at night. Early accounts describe hidebehinds as large, powerful animals despite the fact that no one was able to see them.

== In popular culture ==
The hidebehind has been featured and referenced in popular culture including games, novels, stories, and television.

- In Pecos Bill Catches a Hidebehind, a hidebehind's capture is attempted by the cowboy, who hopes to donate it to a zoo.
- Hidebehinds are mentioned in Diane Duane's Young Wizards series. In the series, they are described as being mostly small creatures, with the fear they engender in those they stalk being a defense mechanism.
- In 2016, the official Harry Potter website Pottermore by J. K. Rowling released a new story about the wizarding school Ilvermorny, which featured a hidebehind. This "nocturnal, forest-dwelling spectre" preys on humanoid creatures, but a witch and Pukwudgie working together were able to defeat the creature. It also features in the revised edition of Fantastic Beasts and Where to Find Them.
- The hidebehind appeared in the Gravity Falls short "Dipper's Guide to the Unexplained: The Hide Behind".
- A "Behinder" is among the Fearsome Critters who appear to drag away an arrogant interloper in the climax of the Silver John story "The Desrick on Yandro" by Manly Wade Wellman.

== See also ==
- Leshy (Slavic Mythology)
