= Cactus cat =

Mythical creature from American folklore

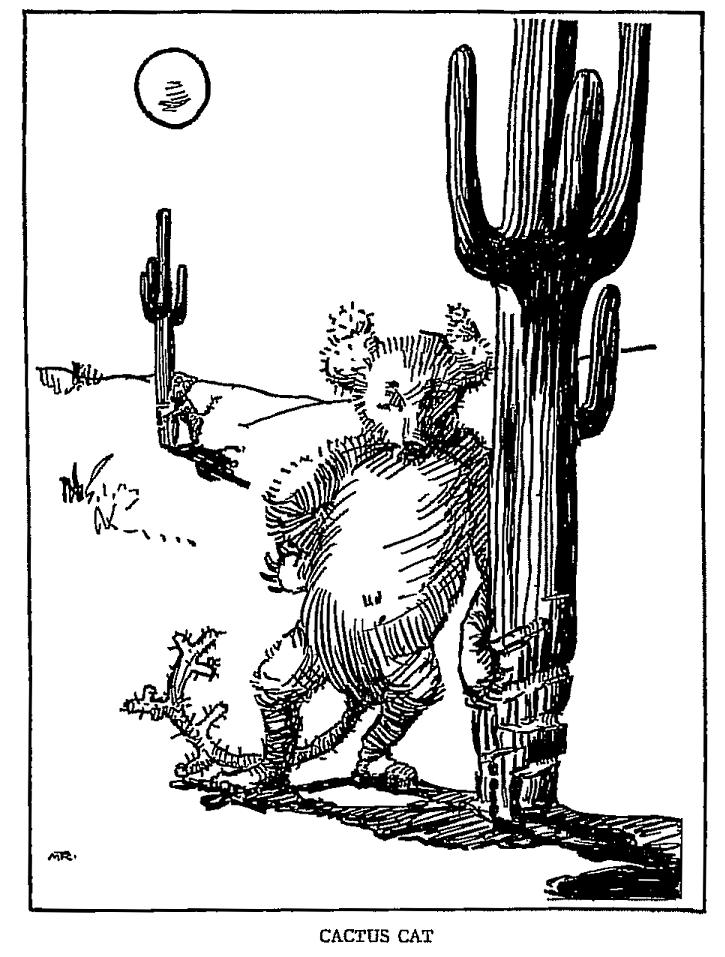

The cactus cat is a legendary "fearsome critter" of the American Southwest.

The cactus cat was generally described being a bobcat-like creature, covered in hair-like thorns, with particularly long spines extending from the legs and its armored, branching tail. The creature was said to use its spines to slash cacti at night, allowing juice to run from the plants. On later nights, the creature was said to return to drink the now fermented juice.
