= Axehandle hound =

Mythical creature from American folklore

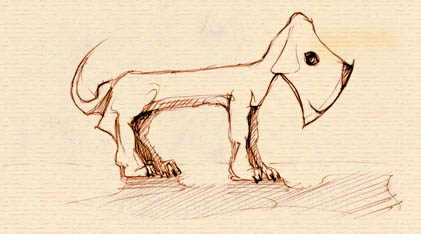
An illustration of an axehandle hound

In American folklore, the axehandle hound (axhandle hound, ax-handle hound, or similar) is a fearsome critter of Minnesota and Wisconsin.

== Description ==
The animal is dog-like with a body which resembles an axe. Its head is shaped like an axe blade, complemented by a handle-shaped body, atop short stubby legs. It subsists on a diet consisting entirely of the handles of axes which have been left unattended. A nocturnal creature, the axehandle hound travels from camp to camp searching for its next meal. According to folklore, the axehandle hound strongly dislikes axe handles made from red oak.

== See also ==
- Fearsome critters
- Folklore of the United States
