= Teakettler =

Mythical creature from American folklore

In American folklore, a teakettler is a legendary creature with origins in lumberjack culture, specifically the lumber camps of Minnesota and Wisconsin. It belongs to a group of related tall tale entities collectively known as fearsome critters and is said to resemble a small stubby-legged dog with the ears of a cat. Its name comes from the sound it makes, which is akin to that of a boiling tea kettle. It only walks backwards, and steam issues from its mouth as it produces its telltale whistle. As the myth goes, only a few lumberjacks have ever seen one as they are very shy, but the sound of a boiling kettle with no discernable source betrays the nearby presence of a teakettler.

An account is given by Jorge Luis Borges under "Fauna of the United States" in Book of Imaginary Beings (1957).

== See also ==
- Fearsome critters
