= Goofus bird =

Mythical creature from American folklore

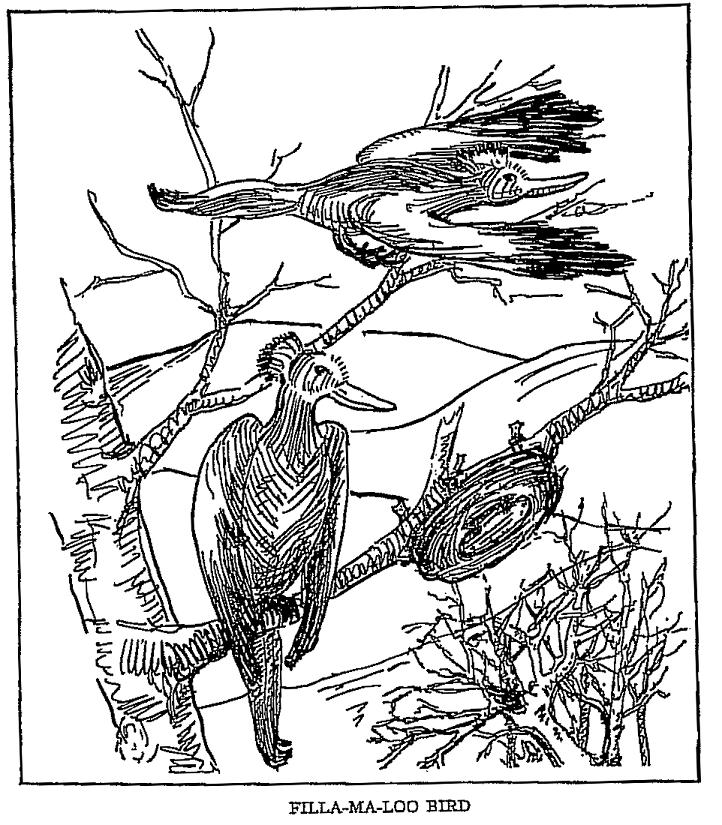
The Fillamaloo, or Goofus bird

The Goofus bird is a mythical, backwards-flying bird, originating in lumberjack folklore in North America. It is also known variously as the Filla-ma-loo bird or the Flu-fly bird.

The Goofus Bird flies backwards, as it does not care where it is going, only where it has been, and it builds its nest upside down. It is described as having a conspicuous appearance, with a turkey-like head, long green neck, with silver scales, a black right wing and a pink left wing.

A person likened to a Goofus Bird is a person low in intellectual curiosity and indifferent to their forward direction. Goofus is a possible origin of the word doofus, slang for a person prone to foolishness or stupidity, perhaps influenced by the German word doof, meaning stupid.

The Goofus bird is one of many fearsome critters of lumberjack folklore, fantastical beasts that were said to inhabit the frontier wilderness of North America, and is an example of a 'tall tale', a story with unbelievable elements related as if it were factual.

== See also ==
- Hummingbirds are capable of backwards flight.
