= Hodag =

Mythical creature from American folklore

Hodag "captured" by Eugene Shepard, 1893

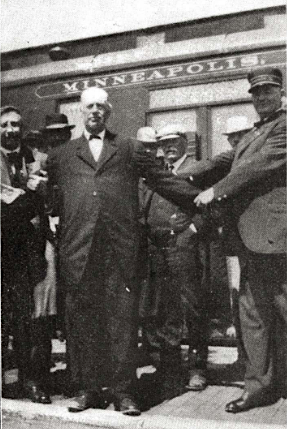
E. S. Shepard, circa 1915

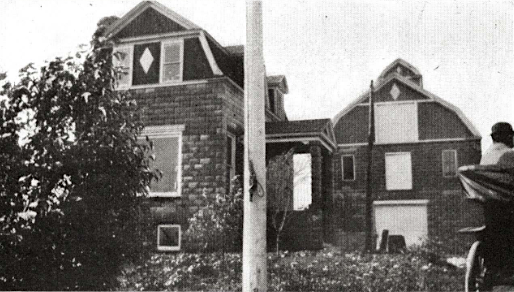
E. S. Shepard's residence in Rhinelander, Wisconsin, the den is to the right where he kept the Hodag

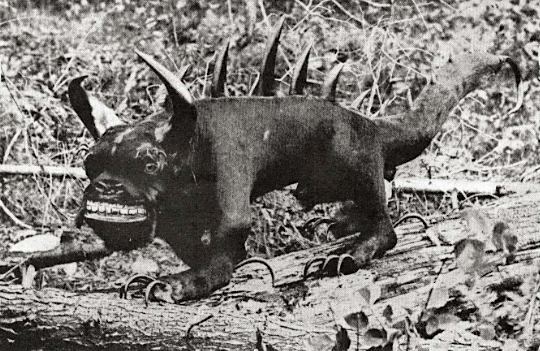
The Hodag

In American folklore, the hodag is a fearsome critter resembling a large bull-horned carnivore with a row of thick curved spines down its back. The hodag was said to be born from the ashes of cremated oxen, as the incarnation of the accumulation of abuse the animals had suffered at the hands of their masters. The history of the hodag is strongly tied to Rhinelander, Wisconsin, where it was claimed to have been discovered. The hodag has figured prominently in early Paul Bunyan stories.

== Origins ==
In 1893, newspapers reported the discovery of a hodag in Rhinelander, Wisconsin. The articles claimed the hodag had "the head of a frog, the grinning face of a giant elephant, thick short legs set off by huge claws, the back of a dinosaur, and a long tail with spears at the end". The reports were instigated by well-known Wisconsin land surveyor, timber cruiser and prankster Eugene Shepard, who rounded up a group of local people to capture the animal. The group reported that they needed to use dynamite to kill the beast.

A photograph of the charred remains of the beast was released to the media. It was "the fiercest, strangest, most frightening monster ever to set razor sharp claws on the earth. It became extinct after its main food source, all white bulldogs, became scarce in the area."

Luke Sylvester Kerney, co-creator of the monster, created additional mythos surrounding it and Shepard as published in his book The Hodag: And Other Tales of the Logging Camps. According to him, a Hodag can be born when an Ox is verbally abused by its handlers and when it dies its body is not burnt for seven years, and is black in colour. The same book says Shepard determined the Hodag was a missing link between the Icthyosaurus and the Mylodon, and after visiting the tomb of King Tut in Egypt, determined it was originally called the Selblatkey.

=== Varients ===
The Sidehill Dodge Hodag, also known as the Cyascutus, is a monster also created by Eugene Shepherd, that was a kind of Hodag. It originally dwelt in the hills and bluffs of Southwestern Wisconsin. It is said to have evolved to have longer legs on one side than the other, so that it can more easily walk across the hills, with the shorter legs on the uphill side.

The Pink Cave Hodag originates in lore created by the Wisconsin Speleological Society for its Hodag Hunt, Picnic and Festival at Cherney Maribel Caves Park. It has multiple legs.

== Hoax ==
Shepard claimed to have captured another hodag in 1896, and this one was captured alive. According to Shepard's reports, he and several bear wrestlers placed chloroform on the end of a long pole, which they worked into the cave of the creature where it was overcome.

He displayed this hodag at the first Oneida County fair. Thousands of people came to see the hodag at the fair or at Shepard's display in a shanty at his house. Having connected wires to it, Shepard would occasionally move the creature, which would typically send the already-skittish viewers fleeing the display.

As newspapers locally, statewide, and then nationally began picking up the story of the Hodag, a small group of scientists from the Smithsonian Institution in Washington, D.C., announced they would be traveling to Rhinelander to inspect the apparent discovery. Shepard was then forced to admit that the hodag was a hoax.

== Legacy ==
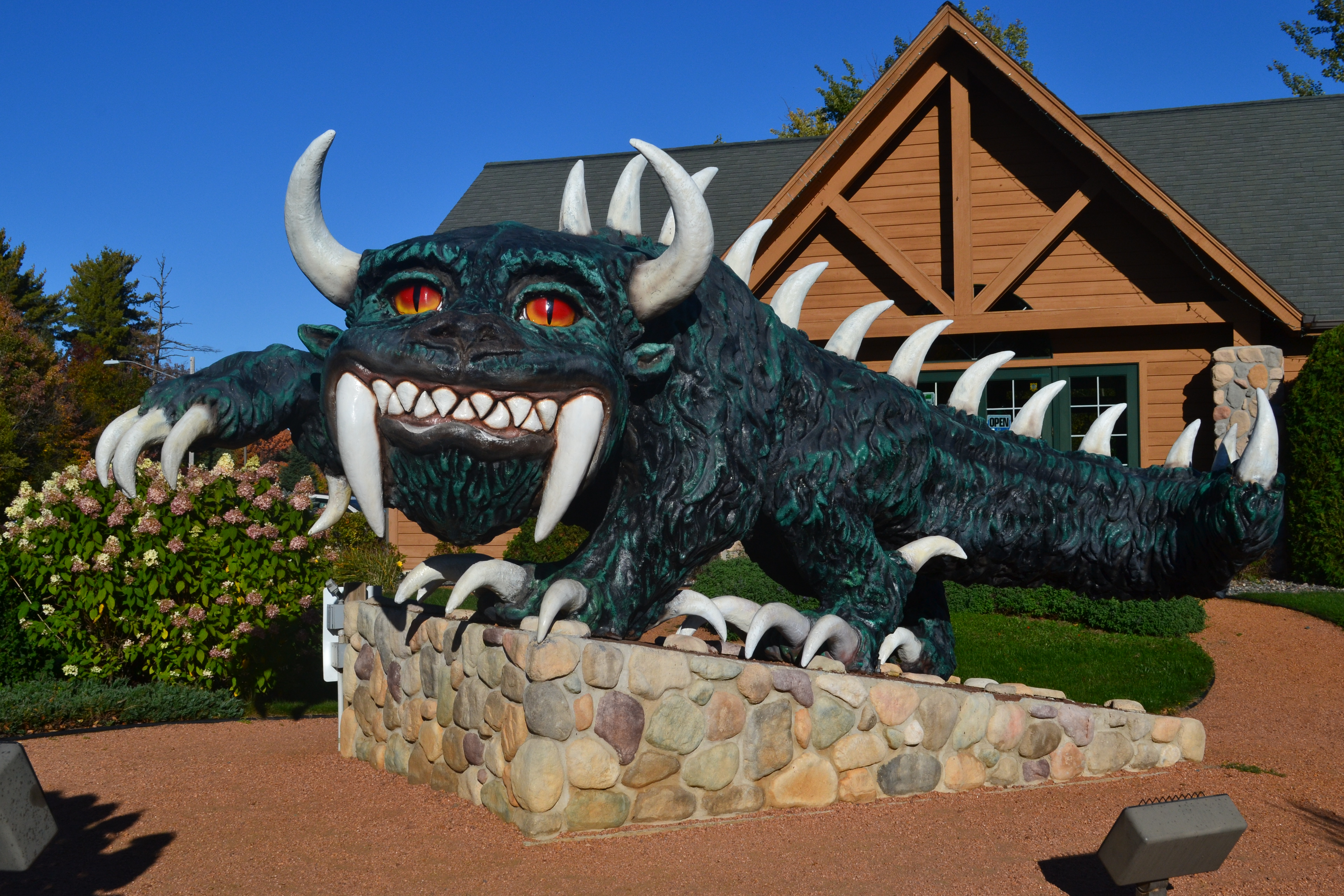
The hodag statue in front of the Rhinelander chamber of commerce.

The hodag became the official symbol of Rhinelander, Wisconsin. It is the mascot of Rhinelander High School, and lends its name to numerous Rhinelander area businesses and organizations, including the annual music festival, Hodag Country Festival. The city of Rhinelander's web site calls Rhinelander "The Home of the Hodag". A fiberglass sculpture of a hodag, created by Tracy Goberville, a local artist, resides on the grounds of the Rhinelander Area Chamber of Commerce where it draws thousands of visitors each year. Rhinelander Ice Arena houses two hodags, one a full body creature just inside the entrance, and the other one an oversized head that blows smoke and has red eyes that light up, located in the corner just off the ice and which was created by the same artist who designed and built the Chamber Hodag.

=== Hoodoo Ski Area, Oregon ===
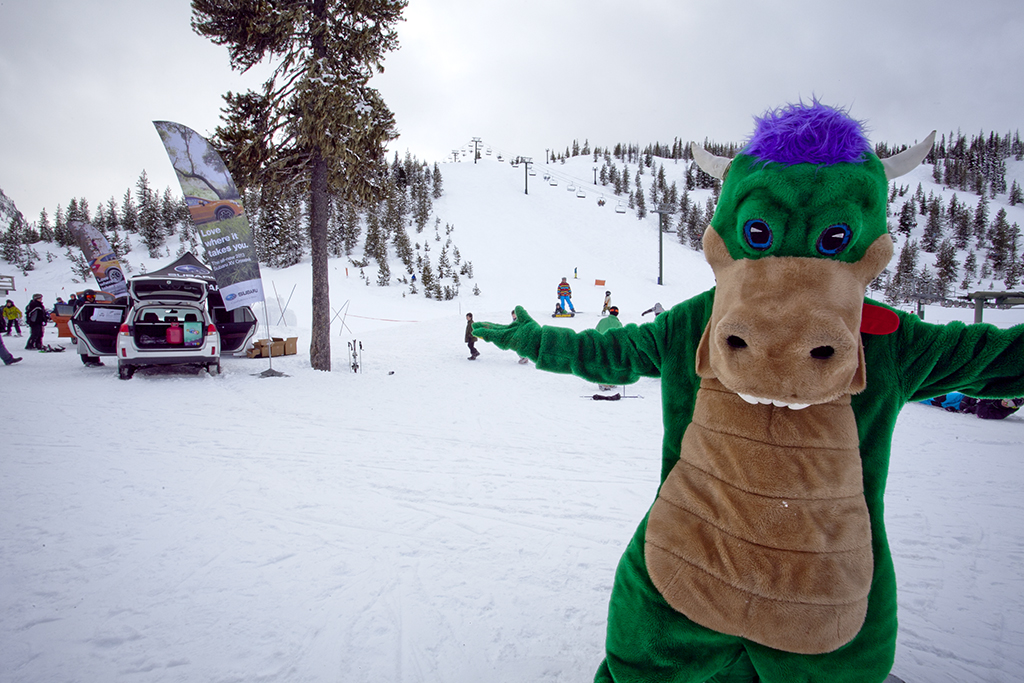
Photo taken of the mascot at the Hoodoo Ski Resort.

The official mascot of Oregon’s Hoodoo Ski Area is Harold the Hodag. The ski area celebrates Harold’s birthday where Harold can be seen in person as well as skiing the slopes of the ski area. In addition, a large chainsaw carving of Harold by artist Bruce Thor exists in the main lodge, and a caricature of Harold appears on stickers, signage, and marketing materials.

According to the ski area’s website both Harold and current Hoodoo owner Chuck Shepard, a descendant of Hodag discoverer Eugene Shepard, originate from Wisconsin. Although they both reportedly left Wisconsin in the 1970s, it wasn’t until 1999 when Chuck, a real estate investor, found Harold living in the deep snow of the Cascade Mountains.

=== As a gift to John F. Kennedy ===
A miniature Hodag was gifted to then Senator Kennedy during a campaign visit to Rhinelander. Kennedy stated in a letter to Henry Berquist that he found it to be a provocative conversation piece.

=== In popular culture ===
The Hodag appears as a villain in the Scooby-Doo! Mystery Incorporated episode "The Hodag of Horror" with its vocal effects provided by Dee Bradley Baker. It was the disguise of Roberto the Chimpanzee who was owned by Ned Fussbuster (voiced by Charles Shaughnessy). They used the Hodag as part of a plot to target a 500 year old cheese.

The Hodag is also a mythical beast in the Harry Potter universe, described in the 2017 expanded edition of Fantastic Beasts and Where to Find Them.

== See also ==
- Folklore of the United States
- Fearsome critters
- Hoax
- Tall tale
