= List of legendary creatures by type =

This list of legendary creatures from mythology, folklore and fairy tales is sorted by their classification or affiliation. Creatures from modern fantasy fiction and role-playing games are not included.

== Animals, creatures associated with ==
=== Arthropods ===
- Karkinos (Greek) – Crab that attacked Heracles and was killed, becoming the constellation of Cancer.
- Nerites (Greek) – Minor sea deity turned into a shellfish by jealous gods.
- Ōmukade (Japanese) – Giant man-eating centipede, but weak to human saliva.
- Zaratan (Arabic) – Giant crab mistaken for an island.

==== Insects ====
- Adze (Ewe) – Vampiric entity that becomes a firefly to fly through keyholes and suck blood.
- Aristaeus (Greek) – Giant who was transformed into a dung beetle.
- Kaggen (San) – Trickster god who takes the form of a praying mantis, louse, or caterpillar.
- Carbuncle (Chilote) – One of its many descriptions is a greenish-red fiery light reminiscent of fireflies
- Cerambus (Greek) – Demigod turned into a wood-gnawing beetle.
- Gallnipper (African-American) – Mosquitos so large that their bones can be used to make fencing.
- Gold-digging ant (Greek) – Reported by Herodotus to live in either Ethiopia or the Indian subcontinent.
- Ītzpāpālōtl (Aztec) – Death goddess with a skeletal head and butterfly wings.
- Khepri (Ancient Egyptian) – Beetle that pushes the sun.
- Melissa (Greek) – Nymph turned into a bee by Zeus.
- Mothman (American cryptid) – Man with moth wings and features.
- Myia (Greek) – Talkative girl transformed into a fly by the goddess Selene.
- Myrmecoleon (Christian) – Ant-lion.
- Myrmex (Greek) – Girl who stole the invention of the plow from Athena and was turned into an ant.
- Myrmidons (Greek) – Warriors created from ants by Zeus.
- Tithonus (Greek) – Prince who was transformed into a cicada.

==== Scorpions ====
- Hedetet (Ancient Egyptian) – Goddess depicted as having the head of a scorpion and nursing a baby.
- Isis (Ancient Egyptian) – Goddess that sometimes takes the form of a scorpion.
- Pabilsag (Babylonian) – Sagittarius-like creature with scorpion tail.
- Scorpio (Greek) – Scorpion that killed Orion.
- Scorpion man (Babylonian) – Protector of travellers.
- Selket (Ancient Egyptian) – Scorpion death/healing goddess.
- Xiezijing (Chinese) – Scorpion Demoness capable of harming both Sun Wukong and the Buddha.

==== Spiders ====
- Aiapæc (Moce) – Creator god, often seen as a spider with an anthropomorphic face and jaguar fangs.
- Anansi (West African) – Trickster spider.
- Arachne (Greek) – Weaver turned into a spider by the goddess Athena.
- Areop-Enap (Nauru) – Creator god, made the earth and sky from a giant clam shell.
- Chaffee Spider (American cryptid) – Large cave spider kept as pest control and guard dogs by early settlers in Chaffee, Colorado, before mysteriously vanishing off the face of the earth.
- Christmas Spider (Ukrainian) – Spider whose webs became the first tinsel on a tree.
- Djieien (Seneca) – Man-sized spider who survived most attacks because its heart was buried underground.
- Iktomi (Lakota) – Trickster spider. Also known in parts of the Rockies.
- Jorōgumo (Japanese) – Spider yokai that can appear as a beautiful woman.
- Phalanx (Greek) – Brother to Arachne in a variation of the story, also turned into a spider.
- Spider Grandmother (Native American) – Important figure across many North West Native American Cultures.
- Tsuchigumo (Japanese) – Shapeshifting giant spider.

=== Birds ===
- Ababil (Islamic) – A miraculous bird.
- Adarna (Philippine) – Colorful bird with healing powers, puts people to sleep, and turns people into stone.
- Avalerion (English) – Eagle-like bird; only a single pair was said to live at any time.
- Alicanto (Chilean) – Bird with luminescent feathers which feeds on gold or silver.
- Anqa (Arabian) – Large, mysterious, or fabulous female bird.
- Anzû (Mesopotamian) – Massive bird who can breathe fire and water.
- Bare-fronted Hoodwink (Cryptid) – Bird with the ability to be "almost seen", created to satirize birdwatchers.
- Caladrius (Roman) – White bird with healing powers.
- Chalkydri (Jewish) – Heavenly creatures of the sun.
- Chamrosh (Persian mythology) – Creature with the body of a dog, and the head and wings of a bird.
- Cinnamon bird (Greek) – Arabian bird that builds nests out of cinnamon.
- Devil Bird (Sri Lankan) – Shrieking bird that predicts death.
- Erodius(Greek) - Person transformed into a heron by Zeus.
- Gagana (Russian) – Miraculous bird with an iron beak and copper claws.
- Gandabherunda (Hindu) – Two-headed magical bird.
- Garuda (Hindu) – Known as the primordial bird and the progenitor of all birds; vehicle of Lord Vishnu.
- Hakawai (Māori) – Bird that was sometimes heard but not usually seen.
- Hudhud (Islamic) – Messenger to prophets.
- Jingwei (Chinese) – A bird who is determined to fill up the sea.
- Luan (Chinese) – A bird which carries a shield and tramples on snakes while wearing one on its breast.
- Minokawa (Philippine) – Giant, dragon-like bird.
- Nine-headed Bird (Chinese) – A totem creature, predecessor to the Fenghuang.
- Oozlum bird (English) – A satirical creature that flies in ever-decreasing circles until it disappears into its own backside.
- Pamola (Abenaki) – A bird/moose spirit who causes cold weather.
- Peng (Chinese) – An enormous bird transformed from a giant fish which flies over the great oceans.
- Phoenix (Greek) –a bird that cyclically regenerates from its own ashes
  - Bennu (Egyptian) – self-creating bird deity.
  - Chol (Biblical) – regenerative bird.
  - Firebird (Slavic) – legendary bird with glowing eyes and feathers, brings misfortune if captured.
  - Fenghuang (Chinese) – a phoenix who reigns over all other birds.
  - Huma bird (Persian) – a bird that flies too high to be seen and never lands.
  - Konrul and Toghrul (Turkic).-Giant twin birds large enough to carry of an elephant.
  - Paskunji (Georgian/ Caucasus) phoenix like underworld dwelling bird. Kills the snakes on the path to the afterlife & aid heroes on quests.
  - Vermilion Bird (Chinese)- a red pheasant that is one of the four symbols of the Chinese Constellations
- Piasa (Native American) – Based on monster depicted on Illinois rock painting near the Mississippi River.
- Qingniao (Chinese) – Blue or green messenger birds of the Queen Mother of the West.
- Ra (Ancient Egyptian) – Sun deity often depicted with falcon features.
- Rain Bird (Native American) – Bird who brought rain.
- Raróg (Slavic) – Fiery demon falcon.
- Roc (Arabian) – Enormous legendary bird of prey.
- Seven Whistlers (English folklore) – Group of seven birds who's call foretells misfortune.
- Shangyang (Chinese) – Rainbird.
- Shedu (Mesopotamian) – Male counterpart to Lamassu.
- Simurgh (Persian) – Phoenix-like bird of enormous size and great longevity and wisdom.
- Stymphalian birds (Greek) – Man-eating birds.
- Thoth (Ancient Egyptian) – Ibis-headed god of the moon, wisdom, and art.
- Three-legged bird (various cultures).
- Thunderbird (Native American) – Legendary bird spirit that brings storms, found primarily among the cultures of the Pacific Northwest, but also the American Southwest, Great Lakes, and Great Plains.
- Turul (Hungarian) – Mythological bird of prey.
- Veðrfölnir (Norse) – Hawk that sits atop an eagle that rests atop the world tree, Yggdrasil.
- Vucub Caquix (Mayan) – Bird demon.
- Wampum Bird (Native American) – Giant heron with shell armor instead of feathers.
- Zhenniao (Chinese) – Poisonous bird.

==== Avian Humanoids ====
- Alkonost (Slavic) – Female with body of a bird.
- Gamayun (Slavic) – Prophetic bird with woman's head.
- Gumyōchō (Yōkai) – Twin-headed human-bird.
- Harpy (Greek) – Ugly winged bird woman, steals food.
  - Aello – Name meaning "storm".
  - Ocypete – Name meaning "swift wing".
  - Celaeno – Name meaning "the dark one".
  - Podarge – Name meaning "fleet-footed".
- Horus (Ancient Egyptian) – Tutelary deity and god of the sky and kingship.
- Inmyeonjo (Korean) – Bird with a human face.
- Itsumade (Japanese) – Monstrous bird with a human face.
- Kalavinka (Buddhist) – Fantastical immortal creature with a human head and a bird's torso and long flowing tail.
- Karura (Japanese) – Divine creature with human torso and bird-like head.
- Kinnara (Buddhist) – Half-bird musicians.
- Lamassu (Mesopotamian) – Goddess with a human head, the body of a bull or a lion, and bird wings.
- Siren (Greek) – Bird-women known for their compelling singing.
  - Achelois – Name meaning "she who drives away pain", surname for the daughters of Achelous.
  - Aglaonoe – Daughter of Achelous and Terpsichore.
  - Agalaope – Name meaning "with lambent voice", daughter of Achelous and Terpsichore.
  - Leucosia – Name meaning "white", daughter of Achelous and either Melpomene or Terpsichore.
  - Ligeia – Name meaning "clear-toned", daughter of Achelous and either Melpomene or Terpsichore.
  - Parthenope – Name meaning "maiden-voiced", Daughter of Achelous and Terpsichore.
  - Pisinoe – Daughter of Achelous and either Melpomene or Sterope.
  - Thelxinoë – Name meaning "mind charming".
- Swan maiden (Multi-cultural) – Shapeshifts from human to swan.
- Tengu (Japanese) – Has human and bird characteristics, name means "dog".

==== Chickens ====
- Alectryon (Greek) – Rooster charged with announcing the arrival of Helios.
- Basan (Japanese) – Fire-breathing chicken.
- Cockatrice – Chicken-headed dragon or serpent, visually similar to the Basilisk.
- Gallic rooster – Symbolic rooster used as an allegory for France.
- Gullinkambi – Rooster who lives in Valhalla in Norse mythology.
- Rooster of Barcelos – A mythological rooster from Portugal.
- Sarimanok (Philippine) – Legendary chicken of the Maranao people who originate from Mindanao.
- Víðópnir – Rooster that sits atop Yggdrasil in Norse mythology.

==== Corvids ====
- Badb (Irish) – War goddess who takes the form of a crow.
- Corone (Greek) – Woman turned into a crow to flee Poseidon.
- Huginn and Muninn (Norse) – Two ravens that serve as messengers.
- Kutkh (Indigenous Russian) – Raven spirit involved in the creation myth.
- Nachtkrapp (German) – Raven who kidnaps children out at night.
- Rainbow crow (Lenape (supposed)) – Crow who brought fire to earth.
- Raum (Demonology) – Demon crow and a great earl of Hell.
- Three-legged crow (East Asian) – Crow with three legs representing the sun.
  - Yatagarasu (Shinto) – Three-legged crow.
- Tulugaak (Inuit) – Raven god and creator of light.
- Waang (Australian Aboriginal) – Trickster crow and culture hero.

==== Eagles ====
- Aethon (Greek) – Eagle tormentor of Prometheus.
- Griffin (Greek) – Guards treasure and priceless possessions.
- Hippogriff (Italian) – Winged horse with the head and upper body of an eagle.
- Huracán (Mayan) – Type of thunderbird that lives beneath the Gulf of Mexico. Etymological origin of "hurricane".
- Hræsvelgr (Norse) – Jötunn who takes the form of an eagle.
- Poukai (Māori) – Monstrous predatory bird, likely based on an extinct species.
- Shahbaz (Persian) – Eagle god who helped the Iranian peoples and guided the Faravahar to the Iranian lands.
- Triple-headed eagle (multi-cultural) –
- Wuchowsen - (Abenaki) One of the four wind spirits in Abenaki lore. Depicted as a giant eagle who lives atop a mountain.
- Ziz (Jewish) – Giant griffin.
- Zu (Mesopotamian) – Divine monster depicted as a lion-headed eagle.

==== Owls ====
- Chickcharney (Bahamas) – Magical owl with powers over fate, sometimes encountered by travellers in pine forests.
- Nyctimene (Roman) – Princess transformed into an owl by Minerva.
- Owlman (English) – Owl-like humanoid compared to America's Mothman.
- Sirin (Slavic) – Birds with women's heads who lured men to their deaths.
- Strix (Greek) – Owl that ate human flesh.

=== Fish ===
- Fish People
  - Mermaid / Merman – half-human, half-fish (worldwide).
  - Water spirit – (worldwide).
  - Undine – water elementals in the alchemical writings of Paracelsus.
- Abaia – giant magical eel .
- Ground Shark – man-eating mystery shark of the Timor Sea.
- Gurangatch (Gandangara) - Rainbow serpent.
- Hippocamp (Greek) – Aquatic creature with the top half of a horse and the bottom half of a fish.
- Ika-Roa
- Il Belliegha (Malta) – Eel like monster with a frog tongue and a hand on the tip of its tail that eats children who get too close to open wells.
- Isonade (Japanese) – Shark like creature.
- Namazu (Japanese) – Giant catfish that causes earthquakes.
- Ningyo (Japanese) – half person, half fish .
- Kun (Chinese) – Fish that transforms into a bird.
- Salmon of Wisdom (Irish) – Salmon that when eaten grants wisdom.
- Shachihoko (Japanese) – a creature with the head of a tiger and the body of a carp.
- Mug-wamp (Canadian) – giant sturgeon monster said to inhabit Lake Temiskaming in Ontario. Name is of Native origin.

=== Mammals ===
==== Aquatic and marine-based ====
- Aspidochelone (Greek) – Island sized whale mentioned in bestiaries.
- Bahamut (Arabic) – Whale monster whose body supports the earth. Word seems far more ancient than Islam and may have the same origin as the word Behemoth in modern Judeo-Christian lore.
- Bake-kujira (Japanese) – Ghost whale.
- Cetus (Greek) – A monster with the head of a boar or a greyhound, the body of a whale or dolphin, and a divided, fan-like tail.
- Devil Whale (English) – Whale capable of swallowing ships.
- Dobhar-chú (Scottish) – King otter.
- Encantado (Brazilian) – Shapeshifting trickster dolphins.
- Glashtyn (Celtic) – Horse goblin from the sea.
- Gveleshapi (Georgian) - Snake-whale monster associated with lakes, rivers and springs. Said to be causes of floods and other water related disasters.
- Lavellan (Scottish) – Water shrew or water vole with poisonous abilities, said to be able to injure cattle over a hundred feet away.
- Makara (Hindu mythology) – Half terrestrial animal in the frontal part (stag, deer, or elephant) and half aquatic animal in the hind part (usually of a fish, a seal, or a snake, though sometimes a peacock or even a floral tail is depicted).
- Sea goat (Greek) – Half goat, half fish.
- Selkie (Scottish) – Shapeshifting seal people.
- Water bull (Scottish) – Nocturnal amphibious bull.
- Water Horse – General name for mythical water dwelling horses of many cultures.
  - Ceffyl Dŵr (Welsh) – Water horse.
  - Each-uisge (Scottish) – Malevolent shapeshifting oceanic water horse.
  - Enbarr (Irish) – Manann's horse, capable of traversing land and sea.
  - Hippocampus (Greek) – Horse with a fish tail.
  - Ichthyocentaurs (Greek) – Upper body of a man, the lower front of a horse, tail of a fish.
  - Kelpie (Scottish) – Water horse.
  - Morvarc'h (Breton) – Legendary horse that could gallop on the waves.
  - Nixie (Germanic) – Shapeshifting water being, known for appearing as horses.
  - Nuckelavee (Orcadian) – Skinless oceanic water horse with pestilent breath.
  - Nuggle (Scottish) – Mischievous male water horse.
  - Tangie (Scottish) – Shapeshifting sea water horse.

==== Bats ====
- Balayang (Australian Aboriginal) – Bat-god and brother to Bunjil.
- Camazotz (Mayan) – Bat spirit and servant of the lords of the underworld.
- Leutogi (Polynesian) – Samoan princess rescued by bats.
- Minyades (Greek) – Three sisters who refused to take part in the worship of Dionysus, and turned into bats by Hermes.
- Tjinimin (Australian Aboriginal) – Ancestor of the Australian people.
- Vetala (Hindu) – Vampiric entity that takes over cadavers.

==== Carnivorans ====
===== Bears =====
- Bjarndyrakongur (Icelandic) – King of bears. Stems from Polar Bear sightings in Iceland being extremely rare, but not unheard of. Has a shining horn on its head topped with a ball and red patches on cheeks.
- Bugbear (Celtic) – Child-eating hobgoblin.
- Callisto (Greek) – A nymph who was turned into a bear by Hera.
- Stiff-Legged Bear (Native American) – Gigantic, hairless bear monster in tribal folklore, predominantly Iroquoians and Algonquians, possibly inspired by mammoths.

===== Canines =====
- Adlet (Inuit) – Tribe of hybrid dog people birthed from a woman who married her dog. Were banished for preying on humans.
- Akhlut (Inuit) – Wolf-orca hybrid monster that hunts on both land and sea.
- Amarok (Inuit) – Giant solitary wolf that hunts at night.
- Anubis (Egyptian) – Jackal-headed god associated with mummification and the afterlife.
- Aralez (Armenian) – Winged dogs that descend from heaven and resurrect fallen warriors by licking their wounds.
- Asena (Altai/Turkish) – She-wolf impregnated by mythical founder of a tribe called the Golturks. They came to Turkey from Altai in Siberia during the empire of Ghengis Khan.
- Axehandle hound (North American) – Axe-shaped dog that reputedly subsists on axe-handles left unattended.
- Black dog (British) – Also known as Barghest, Black Shuck, or Grim; associated with the Devil, Hellhound.
- Beast of Gévaudan (French) – Man-eating wolf, terrorized the province of Gévaudan.
- Carbuncle (Chilote) – One of its many descriptions is a small, luminescent dog.
- Cerberus (Greek, Roman) – Multi-headed dog, guards the gates of the Underworld, son/brother of Orthrus.
- Chupacabra (Latin American) – Alleged creature reputed to attack and drink the blood of livestock, occasionally described with bat-like features. Sometimes thought to resemble, or mistaken for a hairless coyote.
- Cu Sith or Cusith (Irish, Scottish, Hebridean) – A hellhound, a highland harbinger of death.
- Crocotta – Mythical dog-wolf that can imitate human voices, supposedly found in India or Ethiopia.
- Cynocephaly – Humanoids with the head of a dog or jackal.
- Dogs of Actaeon (Greek) – Hunting dogs that turned on Actaeon after he was turned into a deer.
- Failinis (Irish) – Legendary hound with a number of abilities.
- Fenrir (Norse) – Monstrous wolf destined to kill Odin.
- Gelert (Welsh) – Dog killed out of error by Welsh King, thinking it had murdered his infant child.
- Hellhound (Worldwide) – Supernatural dogs, bringers of death.
- Huodou (Chinese) – a large black dog that can emit flames from its mouth.
- Hvcko Capko (Seminole) – Also Long Ears, Stinky Wolf. A horse sized wolf with extra large, pointed ears, a horse's tail and reeks of rot and death. Prolonged exposure to its stench causes deadly illness.
- Kludde (Belgium) – demon summoned from the ashes of witches taking the form of a black wolf with bat wings, a birds beak and bear claws. Has glowing eyes, shapeshifting abilities and great speed.
- Orthrus (Greek) – two headed dog, father/brother of Cerberus.
- Papa-mel or Papamel – Dog of the Amazonian Curupira.
- Penghou (Chinese) – tree spirit that appears like a black dog and tastes like dog-meat.
- Petitcrieu – Fairy dog in Tristan romance.
- Psoglav (Bosnia) – Humanoid monster with dog's head, horse's legs, one eye and iron teeth.
- Salawa – the "Typhonian Animal," a slender, vaguely canine-animal that is the totemic animal of Set.
- Sigbin (Philippine) – is a creature in Philippine mythology.
- Shug Monkey – dog/monkey creature found in Cambridgeshire (Britain).
- Tanuki (Japanese) – Japanese raccoon dog, legends claim is a shapeshifting trickster.
- Vǎrkolak, or "Vukodlak" (Slavic) – Undead vampire werewolf.
- Werewolf – human, shapeshifts to a wolf because of an affliction, lycanthrope (Worldwide).

====== Foxes ======
- Aguara (Chané) – Trickster fox associate with the constellation Scorpius.
- Amaterasu (Japanese) – Sun goddess who sometimes takes the form of a dragon-fox.
- Tulikettu (Finnish) – Fox with flaming fur, whose skin is said to be a safer alternative for lighting than fire. Catching on in a hunt will guarantee riches. Gives name to the northern lights.
- Huli jing (Chinese) – Fox spirits, like Fairies.
- Kitsune (Japanese) – Fox spirits, like Fairies.
- Kumiho (Korean) – Fox spirits, like Fairies.
- Sky Fox (mythology) (Chinese) – Celestial nine-tailed Fox Spirit that is 1,000 years old and has golden fur.

===== Felines =====
- Bael (Demonology) – First king of Hell with three heads: a man, a toad, and a cat.
- Ball-tailed cat (North American) – a feline similar to a mountain lion, except with a long tail with a bulbous end used for striking its prey.
- Cactus cat (North American) – a feline of the American Southwest with hair-like thorns that intoxicates itself by the consumption of cactus water.
- Canaima (Mexico) – Term for a sort of were-jaguar. May be related to skinwalkers.
- Cat-sìth (Celtic mythology) – Spectral cat that haunts the Scottish Highlands.
- Cath Palug (Welsh) – Monstrous cat said to have killed 180 warriors.
- Carbuncle (Chilote) – One of its many descriptions is a cat with a luminescent chin.
- Demon Cat (North American) – a ghost cat who is purported to haunt the government buildings of Washington, D.C.
- Kaibyō (Japanese) – Various forms of cat Yōkai.
  - Bakeneko (Japanese) – Two-tailed cat yōkai.
  - Kasha (Japanese) – Corpse stealing yōkai, sometimes originating as a cat.
  - Nekomata (Japanese) – Cat yōkai from both mountains and domestic areas.
- Nue (Japanese) – Hybrid of monkey, tiger, tanuki and snake. Considered a yokai.
- Panther (Greek) – Wildcat with multicolored hide. Attracts prey with sweet smelling breath and is often ridden by and associated with the god, Dionysus.
- Pard (Greek) – Early understanding of a leopard. It was also surmised that cheetahs were a hybrid of a lion and a pard, hence calling those leopards instead of what we now call leopards.
- Phantom cat, Alien Big Cat (Modern, Worldwide) – Wildcat that seems to appear far beyond its native range by unknown circumstance.
  - Blue Mountains panther (Australian) – Alleged unknown wildcats sighted in Australia.
- Glawackus (American) – Hybrid bear-panther-lion monster that sounds like a hyena and can erase the memory of those who look into its eyes.
- Tyger (English) – Heraldic being that looked like a cross between a lion, horse and wolf, said to be red and speckled.
- Underwater panther (Native American) – Shapeshifting being known by many names among tribes in Eastern US.
- Vapula (European, Christian, Demonology) – A demon with insight into mechanics and science which takes a winged lion form.
- Vassoko (Africa, Chad) – Cat the size of a horse with long fangs and burning eyes. Always accompanied by an entourage of butterflies.
- Wampus cat (American) – Cat with six legs and a long tail; originally a man who was transformed into the creature by a curse .
- White Tiger (Chinese) – a Guardian Of The West cardinal point.
- Winged cat – Archaeological designation for depictions of any mythological creature that can fit that description.

====== Lions ======
- Arimanius (Greek) – Minor lion-headed god.
- Ammit (Egyptian) – Goddess with the forequarters of a lion, the hindquarters of a hippopotamus, and the head of a crocodile.
- Barong (Balinese) – Benevolent king of spirits.
- Beast of the First Kingdom (Christian) – A beast like a lion with eagle's wings seen in the Book of Revelations.
- Brunswick Lion (German) – Loyal companion of Henry the Lion after the two slew a dragon together.
- Chimera (Greek) .
- Chinese guardian lions (Chinese) – Statues depicted in pairs believed to be protectors.
  - Komainu (Shinto).
  - Shisa (Ryukyuan).
  - Sin-you (Japanese).
  - Xiezhi (Chinese).
- Dawon (Tibetan) – Mount of the goddess Durga.
- Egyptian lion gods – Lions were a symbol of warfare and most all of these gods were warriors.
  - Aker – Earth and underworld god.
  - Ȧmi-Pe – A lion god.
  - Apedemak – Depicted as a figure with a male human torso and a lion head.
  - Bast – Lioness goddess of fertility and protection against disease.
  - Hert-ketit-s.
  - Ḥuntheth – A lioness goddess.
  - Ipy (goddess) – Head and feet of a lion, body of a hippo, arms of a human.
  - Maahes – Name means "he who is true beside her".
  - Matit – A funerary cat goddess who had a cult center at Thinis.
  - Mehit – Depicted as a reclining lioness with three bent poles projecting from her back.
  - Menhit
  - Pakhet
  - Repyt
  - Sekhmet – Warrior goddess as well as goddess of healing.
  - Seret – A lioness goddess possibly originally from Libya.
  - Shesmetet
  - Taweret – Depicted as a hippopotamus with lion paws and crocodile tail.
  - Tefnut – Goddess depicted with the head of a lion
  - Tutu – Body of a striding, winged lion, the head of a human, other heads of hawks and crocodiles projecting from the body, and the tail of a serpent.
  - Urit-en-kru – A lioness headed hippopatomus goddess.
- Griffin (Europe)
- Lamassu (Mesopotamian)
- Lampago (Heraldic) – Mythical beast in the form of a "man-tiger or man-lion"
- Leo (Greek) –
  - Lion of Cithaeron (Greek)
  - Nemean lion (Greek)
- Lion of Al-lāt (Arabian) – Lion icon of Al-Lat.
- Manticore (Persian)
- Manussiha (Burmese) – Statue with a human head and two lion hindquarters.
- Merlion (Singaporean) – Fish with a lion's head.
- Narasimha (Hindu) – Part-lion avatar of Vishnu.
- Nian (Chinese) – Flat-faced lion with the body of a dog and prominent incisors, warded away by New Year's celebrations.
- Nongshāba (Sanamahism) – Lion god who created the sun.
- Pixiu (Chinese) – Powerful, winged lions who protect Feng shui practitioners.
- Questing Beast (Arthurian) – Beast with the head and neck of a snake, the body of a leopard, the haunches of a lion, and the feet of a hart.
- Sea-lion (Heraldic) – A half-lion half-fish beast found in heraldry.
- Serpopard (Egyptian) – Lion/leopard body with a snake head.
- Sharabha (Hindu) – Part lion, part bird-beast, with eight legs.
- Simhamukha (Tibetan) – A wisdom dakini of the Dzogchen tradition with the head of a snow lion.
- Snow Lion (Tibetan) – Celestial animal of Tibet.
- Sphinx (Egyptian) –
  - Criosphinx (Egyptian) – Ram-headed sphinx.
  - Gopaitioshah (Persian) – Winged bull or lion with human face.
  - Hieracosphinx (Egyptian) – Has the head of a hawk and the body of a lion.
- Stratford Lyon
- Tigris (Jewish) – Giant lion of the forest of Bei Ilai.
- Vaikuntha Chaturmurti (Hindu) – a four-headed aspect of the Hindu god Vishnu: a human head, a lion head, a boar head and a fierce head.
- Winged lion
- Yali (Hindu) – Portrayed with the head and the body of a lion, the trunk and the tusks of an elephant, and sometimes bearing equine features.
- Yaghūth – A god of the era of the prophet Noah.
- Yaldabaoth (Gnostic) – Lion-headed serpent god.

===== Hyenas =====
- Werehyena- A human who can become a hyena

===== Musteloids and non-hyena herpestoids =====
- Gef- talking mongoose cryptid
- Ichneumon- Creature that kills dragons and reptiles
- Kamaitachi
- Kushtaka (Tlingit) – shapeshifting "land otter man".
- Mujina
- Ramidreju
- Raijū

===== Procyonids =====
- Azeban – trickster raccoon spirit in Abenaki mythology

==== Marsupials ====
- Drop bear
- Bunyip (Australian Aboriginal)

==== Primates ====
- Agropelter – a beast that amuses itself by hurling twigs and tree branches at passersby (United States & Canada).
- Bigfoot or Sasquatch – Cryptid, animal of the Northwest (North America).
- Hibagon or Hinagon – ape-like, similar to Bigfoot, or the Yeti (Japan).
- Jué yuán – blue-furred man-sized rhesus monkey that abducts human women (China & Japan).
- Satori – mind-reading magical ape or monkey (Japan).
- Shōjō – anthropomorphic spirit, depicted as furred, somewhat confounded with orangutan (Japan).
- Shug Monkey – dog/monkey (Britain).
- Sun Wukong (proper name) – powerful warrior-magician in the form of a monkey who hatched from a stone egg (China).
- Vanara – humanoid apes or monkeys (India, Hindu).
- Yeren – man-monkey, cryptid hominid, resides in remote mountainous (China).
- Yeti – Abominable Snowman, ape-like cryptid similar to Bigfoot, that inhabits the Himalayas (Nepal, Tibet).
- Yowie – hominid said to live in the Australian wilderness, a cryptid similar to the Himalayan Yeti (Australia).

==== Rabbits and hares ====
- Al-Mi'raj – rabbit with unicorn horn (Arabia).
- Jackalope – (North America).
- Moon rabbit – a rabbit living on the moon (Chinese).
- Skvader
- Wisakedjak - (Native American) aka Whiskeyjack. One of several names for rabbit trickster spirit of the eastern woodlands and Great Plains.
- Wolpertinger

==== Rodents ====
- Afanc
- Lavellan (Scottish) – Water shrew or water vole with poisonous abilities, said to be able to injure cattle over a hundred feet away.
- Ratatoskr
- Rat king; phenomenon in which a number of rats become intertwined at their tails (Germany, France).
- Wolpertinger

==== Ungulates ====
===== Antelopes and deer =====
- Actaeon (Greek) – a hunter turned into a deer and torn apart by his dogs.
- Ceryneian Hind (Greek) – Artemis' large, sacred golden hind.
- Deer Woman (Native American) – female human above the waist, deer below. Male version is Elk Man.
- Eikþyrnir (Norse mythology) – stag which stands upon Valhalla.
- Goldhorn (Slavic) – white golden-horned antelope.
- Jackalope (North American) – jackrabbit with antelope horns.
- Keresh (Jewish) – giant deer of the forest of Bei Ilai.
- Peryton (Argentina) – Stag that is part bird.
- Qilin (Chinese) – East Asian chimerical good-luck symbol.
- Tarand (European) also Parandrus. Antelope or deerlike creature said to be found in Ethiopia that can change the color of its fur at will to camouflage itself.
- White stag (worldwide) – magic white deer.
- Xeglun (Tungusic mythology) – celestial elk.

===== Bovines =====
- Auðumbla
- Bai Ze
- Kujata (Arabic) – Cosmic bull that bears the angel who holds the earth. Kujata, in turn, stands on Bahamhut.
- Bicorn and Chichevache
- Bonnacon
- Hodag (American) – monster born of the cremated remains of an abused bull
- Minotaur (greek– monster with the head of a bull and the body of a man
- Nandi
- Sarangay – a bull with a huge muscular body and a jewel attached to its ears (Philippines)
- Shedu
- Tē-gû – a giant buffalo living underground which causes earthquakes (Taiwan)
- Ushi-oni – (Japan)

===== Camelids =====
- Allocamelus – A donkey-headed camel.
- Heavenly Llama

===== Caprids =====
- Amalthea
- Aries
- Barometz
- Capricornus
- Chimera
- Dahu
- Faun – a Roman version of satyr. It has a human head and torso and a goat waist and legs.
- Goldhorn – also known as Zlatorog
- Heiðrún – goat in Norse mythology, which produces mead for the einherjar
- Khnum
- Satyr – a goat legged human that is associated to the deity Dionysus. Known to be drunk partiers.
- Sidehill gouger
- Tanngrisnir and Tanngnjóstr – Thor's magical goats
- Chrysomallos – a sheep with golden fleece

===== Equines =====
- Anggitay – is a creature with the upper body of a female human and the lower body of a horse from waist down (Philippines)
- Arion – Talking immortal horse.
- Balius and Xanthus (Greek) – immortal offspring of harpies
- Buraq – Al-Burāq, steed from the heavens that transported the prophets (Islam)
- Centaur(Greek) – head, arms, and torso of a human, the body and legs of a horse
- Cheval Gauvin – horse which tries to kill its rider (French/Swiss)
- Cheval Mallet; horse that tempts and kidnaps weary travelers (French)
- Chiron(Greek) – centaur believed to be exceptional among his brethren
- Chollima – a winged horse too swift to be mounted by any mortal (Chinese)
- Drapé - (France) Ghostly horse who spirits away children wandering at night to an unknown location, never to be seen again.
- Gytrash (English) – shapeshifting spirit usually taking the form of a horse, mule or other animal that appears to the lost and leads them to their destination
- Haizum – horse of the archangel Gabriel (Islam)
- Hippogriff – winged horse with the head and upper body of an eagle (French, English)
- Ipotane(Greek) – half-horse, half-humans, original centaurs
- Karkadann – monstrous, highly aggressive unicorn (India, Persia)
- Kotobuki (Japanese) – Yokai with traits of all members of the Chinese zodiac
- Longma – fabled winged horse with dragon scales (China)
- Mankayia (Kiowa) – tornado spirit in the form of a horse
- Onocentaur(Greek) – part human, part donkey
- Pegasus(Greek) – winged white stallion
- Pooka – spirits or fairies who lived near ancient stones; could be good or bad (Ireland)
- Sleipnir – Odin's eight-legged horse, which he rode to Hel (Norse)
- Simurgh – like the Hippogriff with the head of a human (Persian)
- Sihuanaba – shapeshifting spirit that typically appears as a beautiful, long-haired woman when seen from behind, before revealing her face to be that of a horse
- Tikbalang – creature with the body of a man and the head and hooves of a horse that lurks in the mountains and forests (Philippines)
- Uchchaihshravas – seven-headed flying white horse (Hindu)
- Unicorn – horse-like creature with a single horn, often symbolizing purity (worldwide)
  - Winged unicorn
- Water Horse – general name for mythical water dwelling horses of many cultures
  - Ceffyl Dŵr (Welsh) – water horse
  - Each-uisge (Scottish) – Malevolent shapeshifting oceanic water horse
  - Enbarr (Irish) – Manann's horse, capable of traversing land and sea
  - Hippocampus (Greek) – Horse with a fish tail
  - Ichthyocentaurs (Greek) – upper body of a man, the lower front of a horse, tail of a fish
  - Kelpie (Scottish) – water horse
  - Morvarc'h (Breton) – legendary horse that could gallop on the waves
  - Nixie (Germanic) – Shapeshifting water being known for appearing as a horse
  - Nuckelavee (Orcadian) – Skinless oceanic water horse with pestilent breath
  - Nuggle (Scottish) – Mischievous male water horse
  - Tangie (Scottish) – shapeshifting sea water horse
- White horse

===== Pachyderms =====
- Abath
- Baku
- Behemoth
- Quugaarpak - (Inuit) Explanation for Mammoths & other Ice Age remains washing out of riversides. Underworld monsters who dig their way up to the human world, but die upon breathing our air.
- Taweret

===== Pigs and boars =====
- Calydonian Boar
- Erymanthian Boar
- Zhu Bajie

==== Xenarthrans ====
- Mapinguari

=== Molluscs ===
- Akkorokamui – octopus monster (Ainu, Japan)
- Amikuk (Yup'ik) - Shapeshifting four armed 'octopus' that can swim through land as easily as water.
- Carbuncle (Chilote) – one of its many descriptions is a luminescent bivalve
- Lou Carcolh – A giant, man-eating snail with fur and tentacles (France)
- Kraken – squid monster (Worldwide)
- Shen – A clam-dragon that creates mirages and fata morgana at sea (China)

=== Reptiles ===
==== Limbed ====
- Agoa (American) – turtle monster of West Virginian lore centered around the Monongahela River
- Ammit – female demon, funerary deity and animal hybrid (Egypt)
- Bakunawa – serpentine dragon in Philippines
- Basilisk – king of serpents with the power to cause death with a single glance (Europe)
- Black Tortoise – one of the four symbols of the Chinese constellations
- Chalkydri(Hebrew)-A rainbow colored serpent with 12 wings and the feet of a lion.
- Chinese Dragon – serpentine creature with four legs
- Cipactli – sea monster, part crocodile, fish and toad. Always hungry, thousands of mouths (Aztec)
- Dragon – serpentine, reptilian traits (worldwide)
- Dungavenhooter – a crocodilian creature with no mouth and huge nostrils who uses its tail to pound victims into a vapor, which it then inhales
- Knucker – sea serpent-like dragon
- Kurma
- Loch Ness Monster – sea monster cryptid (Scotland)
- Loveland frog – Humanoid cryptid (The United States (Ohio))
- Luu – (Mongol) – serpentine water dragons capable of causing great floods if angered.
- Makara
- Mokele Mbembe
- Moʻo (Hawaiian) class of shapeshifting lizard monsters
- Morgawr (Cornish) – crocodilian sea serpent that affects fishing
- Mungoon-Gali – a giant goanna (Australia)
- Peluda
- Reptilian humanoids
- Sewer alligator
- Sobek
- Taniwha
- Whowie – a giant frog-headed goanna with six legs (Australia)
- Wyvern
- Zaratan

==== Serpents and worms ====
- Alicante(Mexican)- A snake that drinks breast milk
- Amphisbaena(Greek)- Ant eating lizards with heads on either end
- Amphithere(European)-winged serpent
- Apep/Apophis(Ancient Egyptian)- Chaos deity depicted as a snake.
- Azhi Dahaka(Iranian)- Deity with snakes coming out of his shoulders.
- Basilisk(European- A toxic creature with snake and bird like traits.
- Bakonawa(Philippine)- Moon eating dragon associated with eclipses.
- Biscione(Italian A serpent with a child in its mouth.
- Cockatrice-A wyvern with a chickens head.
- Dragon
- Drake
- Echidna(Greek- Half woman, half snake, known as the mother of monsters.
- Fáfnir(German)- A dwarf that turned into a dragon.
- Feathered serpent
- Garafena (Russian)
- Gorgon
- Hoop snake
- Indus worm
- Hydra
- Jaculus/Jaculi
- Jasconius
- Jörmungandr — the Midgård serpent
- Lamia
- Lindworm
- Madame White Snake
- Meretseger
- Mongolian Death Worm
- Naga
- Níðhöggr
- Orm
- Ouroboros
- Python
- Rainbow serpent
- Sea serpent
- Schießschlange
- Tarasque
- Tolba — the world turtle that supports North America upon its back
- Tsuchinoko
- Typhon
- Ur
- Wyvern
- Yamata no Orochi
- Zilant

== Artificial creatures ==
This listing includes creatures that are man-made, mechanical or of alchemical origins.

- Automaton (worldwide) – self-operating machine; most famous example is Greek mythology's Talos
- Blodeuwedd (Welsh) – wife of Lleu Llaw Gyffes
- Brazen head (Medieval legends) – living head of brass purported to be able to answer any question given to it
- Doll Woman- (Lenape) lifelike doll spirit. Must stay properly appeased, or will cause mischief in the home.
- Frankenstein's monster
- Galatea (Greek) – ivory statue carved by Pygmalion
- Gingerbread man – from German folk tales
- Golem (Jewish) – animated humanoid construct
- Homunculus (Alchemy) – diminutive, animated construct
- Nephele (Greek) – nymph formed from a cloud by Zeus to resemble the goddess Hera
- Shabti (Egyptian) – clay model used as workers
- Tokeloshe (Zulu mythology) – diminutive, hairy humanoid with various magical powers
- Tilberi (Iceland) – creations of witches from a rib bone and wool for the purpose of stealing milk
- Tsukumogami (Japanese) – objects that come to life, of their own accord, after 100 years
- Tulpa (Tibetan Buddhism) – creature brought to life through meditation
- Tupilaq (Inuit) – large statues brought to life to serve witches and shamans
- Ushabti (Egyptian) – clay guardians/assistants
- Various objects animated by gods, demons and spirits in mythology, legend and folklore

== Body parts, creatures associated with ==
=== Blood ===
- Alan
- Chupacabra
- Dhampir
- Preta
- Golden Hind
- Kappa
- Kekkai
- Lamia
- Manananggal
- Mandurugo
- Redcap
- Rokurokubi
- Sigbin
- Vampire
- Werewolf
- Yuki-onna

=== Bone ===
- Bloody Bones
- Gashadokuro
- Grim Reaper
- Skeleton

=== Eye ===
- Argus Panoptes
- Basilisk
- Catoblepas
- Cockatrice
- Cyclopes
- Gorgon
- Hitotsume-kozou
- Lamia
- Lynx
- Mokumokuren

=== Face ===
- Asura
- Deva / Devi
- Noppera-bō

=== Hair ===
- Futakuchi-onna
- Harionago
- Mavka
- Medusa

=== Head ===
- Amphisbaena
- Cerberus
- Chimera
- Chonchon
- Double-headed eagle
- Dullahan
- Hekatonkheires
- Kishi
- Hydra
- Lernaean Hydra
- Nine-headed Bird
- Nukekubi
- Rokurokubi
- Odontotyrannos
- Orthrus
- Shesha
- Penanggalan
- Wanyūdō
- Xing Tian
- Yacuruna
- Yamata no Orochi

=== Limbs ===
- Asura (Indian)
- Deva / Devi (Indian)
- Hekatonkheires
- Hinkypunk - (English) variation on Will o the wisp. A single, incorporeal leg hopping around bogs with a lantern.
- Kui
- O'nya:ten (Iroquoian) aka Dry Fingers. Mummified hand. Appears and leaps out at people after certain transgressions, such as speaking ill of the dead, or butting into other people's personal business.
- Sleipnir
- Three-legged bird

=== Mouth ===
- Futakuchi-onna- Woman with second mouth on the back of her head
- Kuchisake-onna

=== Skin ===
- Selkie
- Skin-walker
- Swan maiden

=== Tail ===
- Bakeneko
- Kitsune
- Yamata no Orochi
- Kumiho
- Hulder
- Nguruvilu

=== Neck ===
- Serpopard
- Rokurokubi
- Vampire

=== Torso ===
- Manananggal
- Geryon

=== Abdomen ===
- Pixiu

== Concepts and creatures associated with ==
=== Battle, vengeance, violence, and war ===
- Androktasiai
- Erinyes
- Hipag
- Hysminai
- Keres
- Lemures
- Makhai
- Onryō
- Phonoi
- Valkyrie
- Vengeful ghost

=== Birth and rebirth ===
- Aralez
- Phoenix
- Ubume

=== Death and immortality ===
- Abasy
- Ammit
- Banshee
- Demon
- Devil
- Dullahan
- Ghost
- Grim Reaper
- Ox-Head and Horse-Face
- Phoenix
- Undead
- Valkyrie
- Vampire

=== Dreams, the mind, and sleep ===
- Alp
- Baku
- Carbuncle
- Devil
- Drude
- Incubus / Succubus
- Mermaid
- Nightmare
- Nue
- Oni
- Sandman
- Satori
- Zduhać

=== Evil eye and sight ===
- Alp (folklore)
- Basilisk
- Balor of the Evil Eye – king of the Fomorians, a race of giants, and a cyclops (Irish)
- Catoblepas
- Cockatrice
- Gorgon(Greek) – woman with hair made of living, venomous snakes, and eyes that turned men to stone.
  - Medusa – once a human, Medusa and her sisters were cursed to be terrible monsters by Athena
  - Euryale – second eldest of the three vicious Gorgon sisters
  - Stheno – eldest of the Gorgon Sisters

=== Fertility and human sexuality ===
- Alan
- Boto
- Faun
- Gancanagh
- German
- Incubus / Succubus
- Maenad
- Nymph
- Pombero
- Popobawa
- Satyr
- Sileni / Silenus
- Unicorn
- Zemyna / Zemepatis
- Simurgh

=== Fortune, luck, and wealth ===
- Carbuncle (Chilote) – said to be the "guardian of the metals"
- Dwarf
- Egbere
- Genie
- Leib-Olmai
- Leprechaun
- Matagot
- Pixiu
- Sarimanok
- Sigbin
- Yaksha / Yakshini

=== Light ===
- Angel
- Chalkydri
- Deity
- Lampetia
- Will-o'-the-wisp
- Dragon

=== Love and romance ===
- Cupid / Eros / Cherub
- Gancanagh
- Selkie
- Swan maiden
- Madame White Snake
- Melusine
- Tennin
- Undine

=== Sound ===
- Banshee
- Encantado
- Fenghuang
- Fossegrim
- Mermaid
- Nue
- Siren
- Yamabiko

=== Speech ===
- Gef
- Satan

=== Time and technology ===
- Chronos
- Father Time
- Gremlin

=== Wisdom ===
- Baba Yaga
- Bai Ze
- Griffin
- Salmon of Wisdom
- Sphinx

== Demons ==
- See list of theological demons

== Elements, creatures associated with ==
=== Aether ===
- Chalkydri
- Deity
- Elemental
- Spirit
- Angel
- Demon
- Devil
- Yokai
- Nymph
- Elf
- Fairy

=== Air and wind ===
- Ala
- Elemental
- Feldgeister
- Zduhać

=== Darkness ===
- Black dog
- Bogeyman
- Enenra
- Ghost
- Grim Reaper
- Wechuge
- Wendigo
- Shadow People
- Vampire
- Werewolf
- Oni
- Gashadokuro
- Camazotz
- Wild Hunt
- Hell Hound

=== Earth and subterranean ===
- Asag
- Bluecap
- Elemental
- Dwarf
- Earth Dragon
- Gargoyle
- Giant
- Gnome
- Goblin
- Golem
- Knocker (folklore)
- Monopod
- Nymph
- Ogre
- Oread
- Ten Ten-Vilu
- Troll

=== Fire ===
- Basan
- Bluecap
- Cherufe
- Chimera
- Dragon
- Elemental
- Enenra
- Ifrit
- Hellhound
- Lampad
- Phoenix
- Salamander

=== Light and rainbow ===
- Angel
- Chalkydri
- Light Elf
- Rainbow crow
- Rainbow Serpent

=== Metal and gold ===
- Alicanto
- Pixiu
- Carbunclo
- Chrysomallos
- Cyclopes
- Gnome
- Leprechaun
- Bulgasari

=== Thunder and lightning ===
- Chinese dragon
- Cyclopes
- Feldgeister
- Kitsune
- Raijū
- Thunderbird
- Valkyrie

=== Water ===
- Afanc
- Amefurikozō
- Aspidochelone
- Bloody Bones
- Buggane
- Bunyip
- Camenae
- Capricorn
- Cetus
- Charybdis
- Chinese Dragon
- Cai Cai-Vilu
- Crinaeae
- Davy Jones' Locker
- Draug
- Each uisge
- Elemental
- Fish People
- Fossegrim
- Fur-bearing trout
- Gargouille
- Grindylow
- Haetae
- Hippocamp
- Hydra
- Ichthyocentaur
- Jasconius
- Jengu
- Kappa
- Kelpie
- Kraken
- Lake monster
- Lavellan
- Leviathan
- Loch Ness Monster
- Lorelei
- Lusca
- Makara
- Melusine
- Mami Wata
- Mermaid / Merman
- Merrow
- Morgens
- Muc-sheilch
- Naiad
- Näkki
- Nereid
- Nix
- Nymph
- Pisces
- Ponaturi
- River gods
- Rusalka
- Samebito
- Sea monster
- Sea serpent
- Selkie
- Shen
- Siren
- Taniwha
- Tiamat
- Triton
- Undine/Ondine
- Vodyanoy
- Water dragon
- Water leaper
- Water sprite
- Yacuruna
- Zaratan

== Habitats, creatures associated with ==
=== Cave and underground ===
- Dwarf
- European dragon
- Gnome
- Goblin
- Golem
- Grootslang
- Kaboutermanneken
- Knocker
- Leprechaun
- Troll
- Yaoguai

=== Celestial and heaven ===
- Angel
- Chalkydri
- Deva / Devi
- Feathered serpent
- Heavenly Llama
- Pegasus
- Grim Reaper
- Swan Maiden
- Tennin
- Three-legged bird
- Valkyrie

=== Desert ===
- Amphisbaena
- Basilisk
- Cockatrice
- Ghoul
- Mongolian Death Worm
- Sphinx

=== Temperate forest and woodland ===
- Äbädä (Turkic) – forest spirit with shoes on the wrong feet
- Ajatar
- Bigfoot
- Dryad
- Elf
- Green Man
- Irrwurz
- Leshy
- Lindworm
- Mavka
- Moss people
- Owlman
- Satyr
- Unicorn

=== Tropical forest and jungle ===
- Curupira
- Dingonek
- Mapinguari
- Manticore
- Saci

=== Temperate grassland and garden ===
- Fairy
- Gnome

=== Savanna ===
- Ennedi tiger
- Werehyena

=== Lake and river ===
- Ahuitzotl
- Bak
- Bunyip
- Chinese dragon
- Dobhar-chú
- Encantado
- Grootslang
- Iara
- Jiaolong
- Kappa
- Kelpie
- Lake monster
- Hydra
- Loch Ness Monster
- Mizuchi
- Mugwump
- Naiad
- Nixie
- Ogopogo
- Ondine
- Rainbow serpent
- Rusalka
- Ryujin
- Shellycoat
- Warlock
- Yacuruna

=== Mountain and hill ===
- Alp
- Dwarf
- Fenghuang
- Griffin
- Hippogriff
- Mountain Giant
- Kamaitachi
- Mavka
- Oread
- Patupaiarehe
- Rübezahl
- Satyr
- Tengu
- Yeti

=== Sea ===
- Amikuk
- Aspidochelone
- Bishop-fish
- Charybdis
- Cai Cai-Vilu
- Dragon King
- Fish People
- Hippocamp
- Iku-Turso
- Leviathan
- Jormungand
- Kraken
- Mermaid / Merman
- Nereid
- Sea monk
- Sea serpent
- Selkie
- Shen
- Siren
- Tritons
- Umibōzu
- Water Dragon
- Yacuruna

=== Swamp and marsh ===
- Błudnik
- Bunyip
- Grootslang
- Lernaean Hydra
- Honey Island Swamp monster
- Mokele-mbembe
- Swamp monster
- Will-o'-the-wisp

=== Volcano and lava ===
- Cherufe
- Phoenix
- Salamander

=== Polar, ice, and winter ===
- Akhlut
- Amarok
- Hrimthurs
- Ijiraq
- Jotun
- Qiqirn
- Saumen Kar
- Tizheruk
- Wechuge
- Wendigo
- Yeti
- Ymir
- Yuki-onna
- Frau Holle

=== Urban and house ===
- Banshee
- Boggart
- Brownie
- Domovoi – Slavic house spirit
- Dvorovoi – Slavic yard spirit
- Duende
- Jinn
- Kobold
- Tomte
- Vampire
- Zashiki-warashi

=== Underworld and hell ===
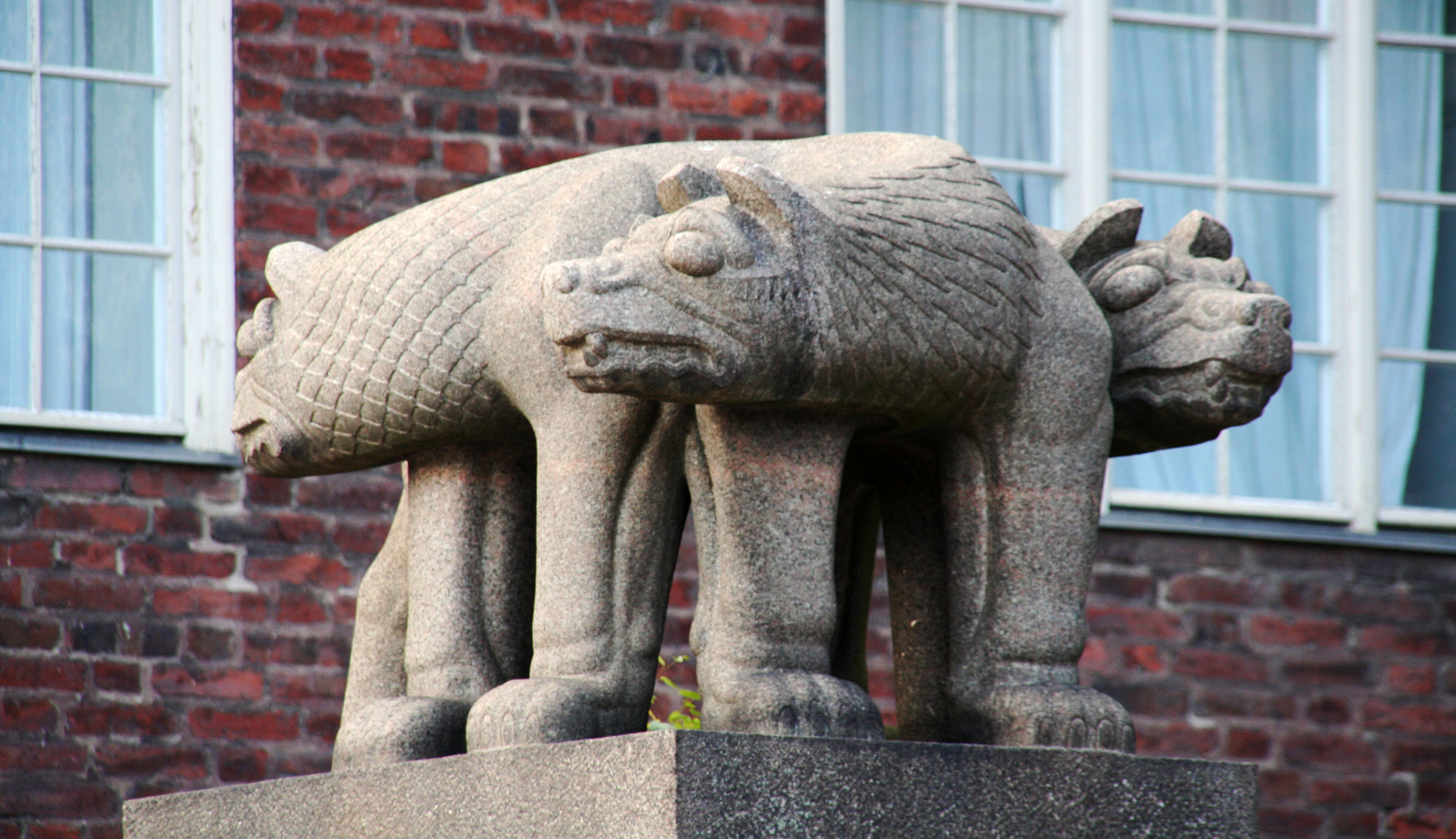
Cerberus

- Ammit
- Cerberus
- Cyclopes
- Demon
- Devil
- Earth Dragon
- Garm
- Hekatonkheires
- Hellhound
- Ifrit
- Ox-Head and Horse-Face
- Preta

== Humanoids ==
See Mythic humanoids

== Astronomical objects, creatures associated with ==
=== Sun ===
- Chalkydri beings from the Second Book of Enoch
- Kua Fu a giant in China
- Three-legged bird in China, Korea, and Japan

=== Moon ===
- Jade rabbit
- Werewolf
- Werejaguar
- Alien

=== Constellation ===
- Azure Dragon
- Black Tortoise
- Capricorn
- Centaur
- Heavenly Llama
- Ladon
- Nemean Lion
- Pegasus
- Phoenix
- Vermilion Bird
- Yellow Dragon
- White Tiger

== World ==
- World Elephant
- World Tree
- World Turtle

== Creatures associated with plants ==
- Alraune
- Clickbok Tree- (American) An oak tree planted by a slave which later comes to life to protect his wife and son from a vengeful slave overseer.
- Dryad
- Ghillie Dhu
- Green Man
- Hamadryad
- Jubokko
- Kodama
- Leshy
- Mandrake
- Penghou
- Snake Tree- (Lakota) Tree brought to life by a witch. Lashes out at anything that comes close with branches covered in poisonous thorns that paralyze the victim.
- Spriggan
- Tree of life
- Vampire pumpkins and watermelons (Romani)
- Vegetable Lamb of Tartary
- Zapam Zucum
- Zaqqum
- See Trees in mythology

== Creatures associated with times ==
=== Day and diurnal ===
- Griffin
- Jackalope
- Unicorn (rather resembles the moon)
- Wolpertinger

=== Night and nocturnal ===
- Amarok
- Bigfoot
- Ennedi tiger
- Ghoul
- Owlman
- Werewolf
- Vampire

== Undead ==
- Aswang
- Banshee – (Scottish, Gaelic, Irish)
- Chindi - (Navajo) The dark side of the soul which has the ability to remain behind in the earth after death and become a sort of dark spirit.
- Drekavac (Croatia) Name used for several distinct undead monsters.
- Ghost – (Worldwide)
- Inipi- (California Native) shapeshifting ghosts
- Jikininki
- Kuchisake-onna
- Lugat (Albanian)
- Poltergeist – (Worldwide)
- Preta
- Revenant
- Sluagh
- Spirit – (Worldwide)
- Tei Pai Wanka - (Wampanoag) Term for swamp lights in Algonquian lore. Enslaved souls of people taken by the Little People who are used to scare people who've done wrong or lure them to their deaths.
- Wanagi- (Lakota) Lakota name for Siouan shadow people. Essentially ghosts.
- Wewe Gombel
- Wili
- Will o' the wisp – Jack o lantern (English)
- Wraith
- Yurei
- Ghosts in Hindu Mythology: Bhoot, Baital and Pishacha

=== Corporeal ===
- Draugr
- Fext
- Ghoul
- Jiangshi
- Lich
- Manananggal
- Mullo (Romani) variation on a vampire.
- Mummy (undead) (modern interpretation)
- Myling
- Nukekubi
- Pontianak
- Skeleton
- Vampire
- Zombie

== Miscellaneous ==
- Anaye - (Navajo) various monsters that take the forms of animals, living objects and other things. Derived from a time when men and women bet on who would last the longest without the other sex and the women pleasuring themselves with whatever random things they thought would do the job, which caused their chosen toys to father them monstrous, man-eating children.
- Daimon
- Demon
- Fairy
- Familiar
- Genie – or Jinn, Djinn
- Monster
- Sprite
- Yōkai
