= List of megafauna in mythology and folklore =

Mythological creatures that would reach immense height

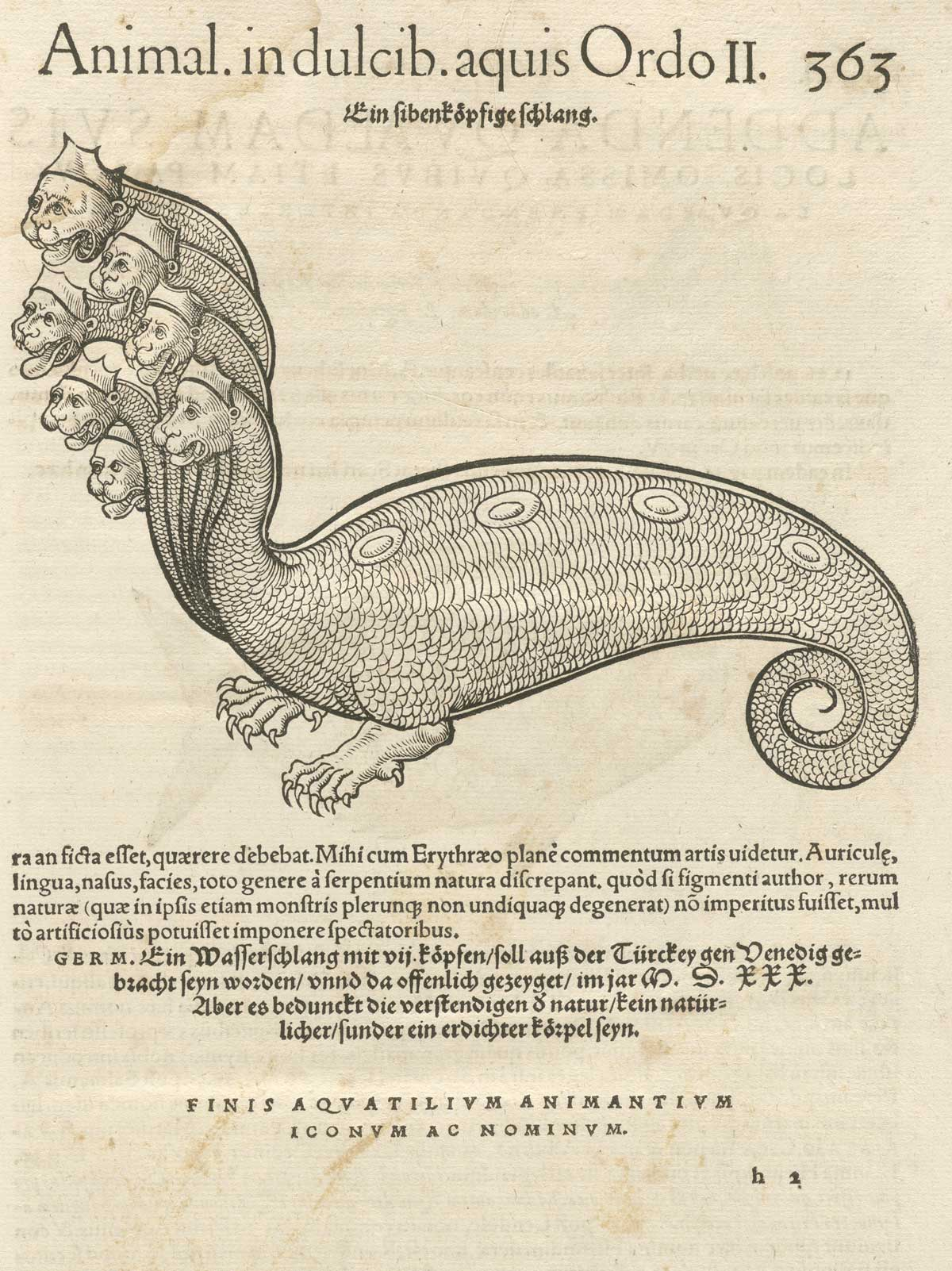
A Hydra. The 16th-century German illustration.

A giant animal in mythology is unusually large, either for their species or in relation to humans. The term giant carries some ambiguity; however, in mythology, definitions of what constitutes 'large' vary, with definitions ranging from 40 kg (88 lb) upwards. At the upper end of this scale, they may be further subdivided into small (250–500 kg (550–1,100 lb)), medium (500–1,000 kg (1,100–2,200 lb)) and large (over 1,000 kg (2,200 lb)). Megafauna often form one of the mythemes of a story. The narrative may revolve around a real animal or a primordial archetype of a gigantic creature, such as a dragon, sea monsters, or Jörmungandr, the Miðgarðr-Serpent.

== Examples of megafauna ==
Numerous myths and folklore exist depicting giant animals, including Australian, Greek, Native American, among others.

=== Africa megafauna mythology ===
- Dingonek
- Nandi bear
- Mokele-mbembe
- Grootslang
- Salawa

=== Oceania megafauna mythology ===
- Abaia
- Bunyip
- Tiddalik
- Rainbow Serpent

=== Central and South America megafauna mythology ===
- Headless Mule
- Mapinguari
- Peuchen
- Yacumama

=== North America megafauna mythology ===
- Amarok
- Altamaha-ha
- Akhlut
- Jersey devil
- Mothman
- Mugwump
- Ogopogo
- Thunderbird
- Tizheruk
- Snallygaster
- Wechuge
- Hidebehind
- Hodag
- Hugag
- Underwater panther

=== Eurasian megafauna mythology ===
- Akkorokamui
- Bai Hu
- Bake-kujira
- Baku
- Bakunawa
- Beast of Gevaudan
- Behemoth
- Brosno dragon
- Dragon
- Chinese dragons
- Chimera
- Japanese dragons
- Gashadokuro
- Genbu
- Griffin
- Cerberus
- Hydra
- Manticore
- Minokawa
- Mongolian death worm
- Nāga
- Nue
- Karkadann
- Kraken
- Leviathan
- Loch Ness Monster
- Midgard snake
- Ushi-Oni
- Qilin
- Shadhavar
- Shisa
- Sphinx
- Raiju
- Roc
- Timingila
- Ziz
- Zaratan
