= Sean Corcoran =

Irish artist working with stained glass, mosaics, wood

Sean Corcoran MIDI (born 8 July 1969) is an Irish visual artist noted for his stained glass, mosaics, wooden sculpture, and sand art.

== Career ==
In more recent years Corcoran has exhibited his work in digital art, photography, and mapmaking. He also does interior design and has been accepted as a member of The Institute of Designers of Ireland. He resides in Waterford, Ireland with his family. He is the artistic director of The Art Hand, an art school in Waterford, that specialises in art courses in stained glass, mosaic, digital art, film, and painting.

He was the resident artist/designer and co-owner (with his father Jim) of The Salvage Shop, which is now closed. It was described by the art critic Liam Murphy as an emporium of the imagination. In 1998, The Salvage Shop assisted Red Kettle Theatre Company with its production of Jim Nolan’s play The Salvage Shop that was loosely based on the Corcorans' premises.

Sean Corcoran's solo exhibitions have included Bandsaw and Glasscutter (1996), Streetscape and Other Shapes(1999), Photo Distortions (2005) and Lost and Found (2006). He has been involved in many group shows and in 2000 was one of the American artist Ernest Ruckle's collaborators for the Euro Disney Art Show held in the Louis K. Meisel Gallery in Soho, New York. He is currently working on as series of photographic projects including what he terms Drive by Shootings and The Face of a City. His official website shows an extensive portfolio of work and has a regularly updated journal. In 2009, he completed a map, guide and DVD of Omey Island in Connemara, County Galway, Ireland. He claims to have witnessed a Dobhar-chú / master otter in the lake on the island. He has received much media coverage for his creations.

Corcoran creates large beach murals, often in the sand beach at Copper Coast Geopark.
