= Tuluŋigraq =

Inuit deity

In the form of Inuit mythology in vogue among the Iñupiat of north-western Alaska, Tuluŋigraq was a god created by the primordial aana (or "grandmother") goddess. (cf. the god Tulugaak of the eastern Inuit)

- When the world was in perpetual darkness of night, he stole the skin-wrapped sun, and with his beak released it from the skin: it flew upward, creating daylight.
- By wrestling her, Tuluŋigraq had acquired as wife an uiḷuaqtaq, a 'woman who had refused to marry'. (With this theme, Lowenstein compared the shamanic experience wherein "the shaman wrestles with" the goddess Nuliajuk, as recorded by Rasmussen (1930) for the Iglulik.) [comparative note: just as Nuliajuk was the goddess controlling seals, so likewise the goddess Thetis of Hellenic myth was acquired as wife by the mortal hero Pēleus, by means of his wrestling her, after he had killed Phokos ('Seal').]
- He had also harpooned a strange sea-animal: "The animal came up dry. It rose in the water. It was dry land. It was Tikiġaq." [comparative: just as Tikiġaq is located at the tip of a promontory, so likewise it was at a promontory (Sepias) that Pēleus wrestled Thetis; there, just as Tuluŋigraq was blackened with puiya, so likewise was Pēleus blackened with sepia.]
