= Amikuk =

Mythical creature from Yupʼik folklore

Creature information
- Other name(s): A-Mi-Kuk; Amikut; Qamungelriit
- Grouping: Monster
- Sub grouping: Shapeshifter
- Folklore: Yup'ik, Legendary creature

Origin
- Country: United States of America
- Region: Alaska

The Amikuk is a creature of Yup'ik legend, said to live within the ground.

As a shapeshifter, the Amikuk is said to take many forms, and to behave differently dependent on where a person encounters them. In the sea, it is reported to be hairless with four arms. Its skin is leathery, and it will attack hunters in their kayaks, dragging them under the water to be eaten. As it lives within the ground, the Amikuk will pursue hunters onto land, swimming through the earth as easily as they swim through the water.

In its natural habitat within the earth itself, the Amikuk is said to turn the surface a person is walking on into quicksand by quickly "swimming" around them. If a person is holding a walking stick, they will become tired as this is happening. The Amikuk will then swim upwards, into the person themselves, making the person they now inhabit weak. An Amikuk may also jump through a person, which causes them to "lie down and [die]".

The Amikuk can also take the form of a human, which it may do when it is "tired of being amikut for a long time". In human form, the Amikuk may be referred to as a Qamungelriit. Yup'ik elders describe coming across an Amikuk pulling a sled across the ice, which it can only do in a straight line. If a person encounters an Amikuk in human form, they should sit down with their back to the creature, and not speak to it. The Amikuk is then said to offer gifts of increasing value. The legends state that a person should be silent until the Amikuk has offered the person everything they need, or everything that is on their mind.

When the Amikuk is shot, it is said to multiply into eight beings.

A traditional Yup'ik mask representing the Amikuk by Aarnaquq (a.k.a. Phillip John Charette) is on permanent display at the Portland Art Museum.
