= Wewe Gombel =

Female ghost in Javanese mythology

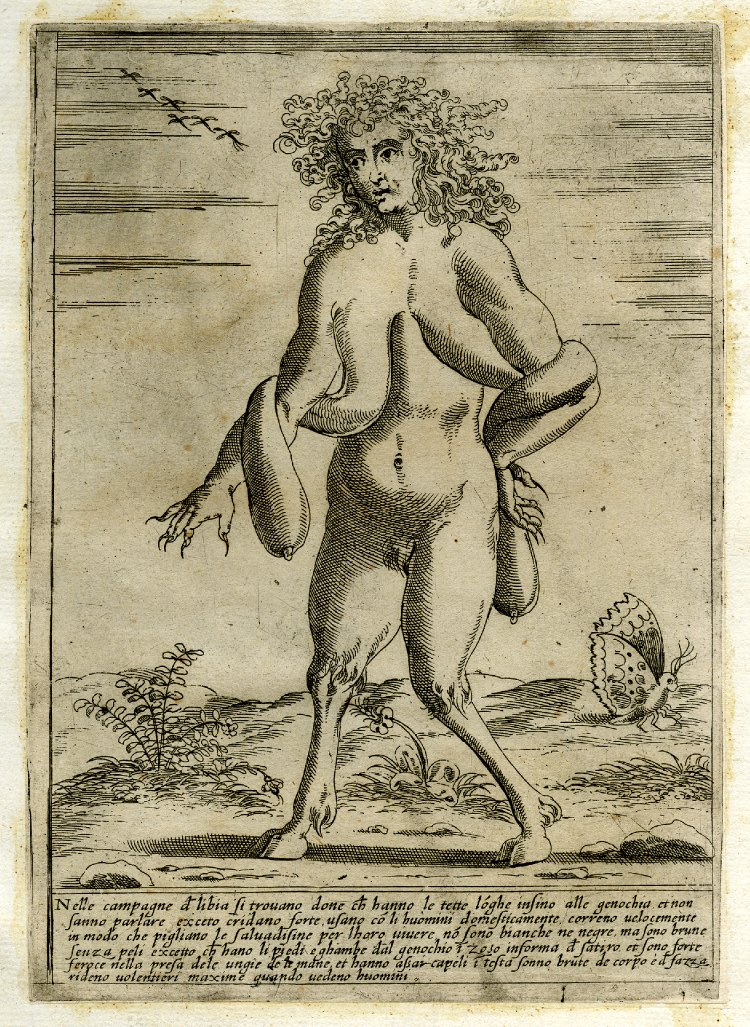

Creature information
- Grouping: Legendary creature
- Sub grouping: Nocturnal, undead
- Similar entities: Rangda
- Folklore: Indonesian folk mythology

Origin
- Country: Indonesia
- Region: Southeast Asia
- Habitat: Arenga pinnata palm

Wewe Gombel is a female supernatural being or vengeful ghost in Javanese mythology. It is said that she kidnaps children.

This myth is taught to encourage children to be cautious and to stay at home at night. Traditionally, the Wewe Gombel is represented as a woman with long, hanging breasts. Modern representations include vampire-like fangs. This is a popular spirit that also appears in comics.

== Legend ==
The ghost was named Wewe Gombel because it is related to an event that, according to ancient folklore, happened in Bukit Gombel Semarang, where long ago a married couple lived. They had been married for years but had no children. As time went by, the husband realized that his wife was infertile and stopped loving her. The husband became wayward, neglecting his wife and leaving her alone for long periods so she lived in sorrow. One day, she followed him and caught him in a sexual relationship with another woman. Hurt by her husband's betrayal she became furious and killed him. Faced with the crime, angry neighbors gathered in a mob and chased her from the village. Despairing at the ostracization and continual harassment, she committed suicide.

After death, her vengeful spirit became Wewe Gombel. Sundanese folklore says that she dwells in the crown of the Arenga pinnata palm, where she has her nest and keeps the children she catches. She does not harm them and once they are under her clutches they are not afraid of her.

Local traditions say that the children she abducts have been mistreated or neglected by their parents. She treats the children lovingly as a grandmother would, taking care of them and protecting them until their parents repent, at which point she returns them.

Wewe Gombel has affinities with the ghost known as Hantu Kopek in Malay folklore.

== Modern adaptations ==
Wewe Gombel has been featured in Indonesian movies, such as the 1988 film Wewe Gombel and the 2012 film Legenda Wewe Gombel (The Legend of Wewe Gombel).

The HBO Asia anthology series Folklore features an adaptation of Wewe Gombel in the episode "A Mother's Love".

Representations of Wewe Gombel are sometimes part of popular local festivals.

== See also ==
- Bogeyman
- Calon Arang
- Madam Koi Koi
- Rangda
- Zapam Zucum
