= Monster =

Fearsome or grotesque fictional being

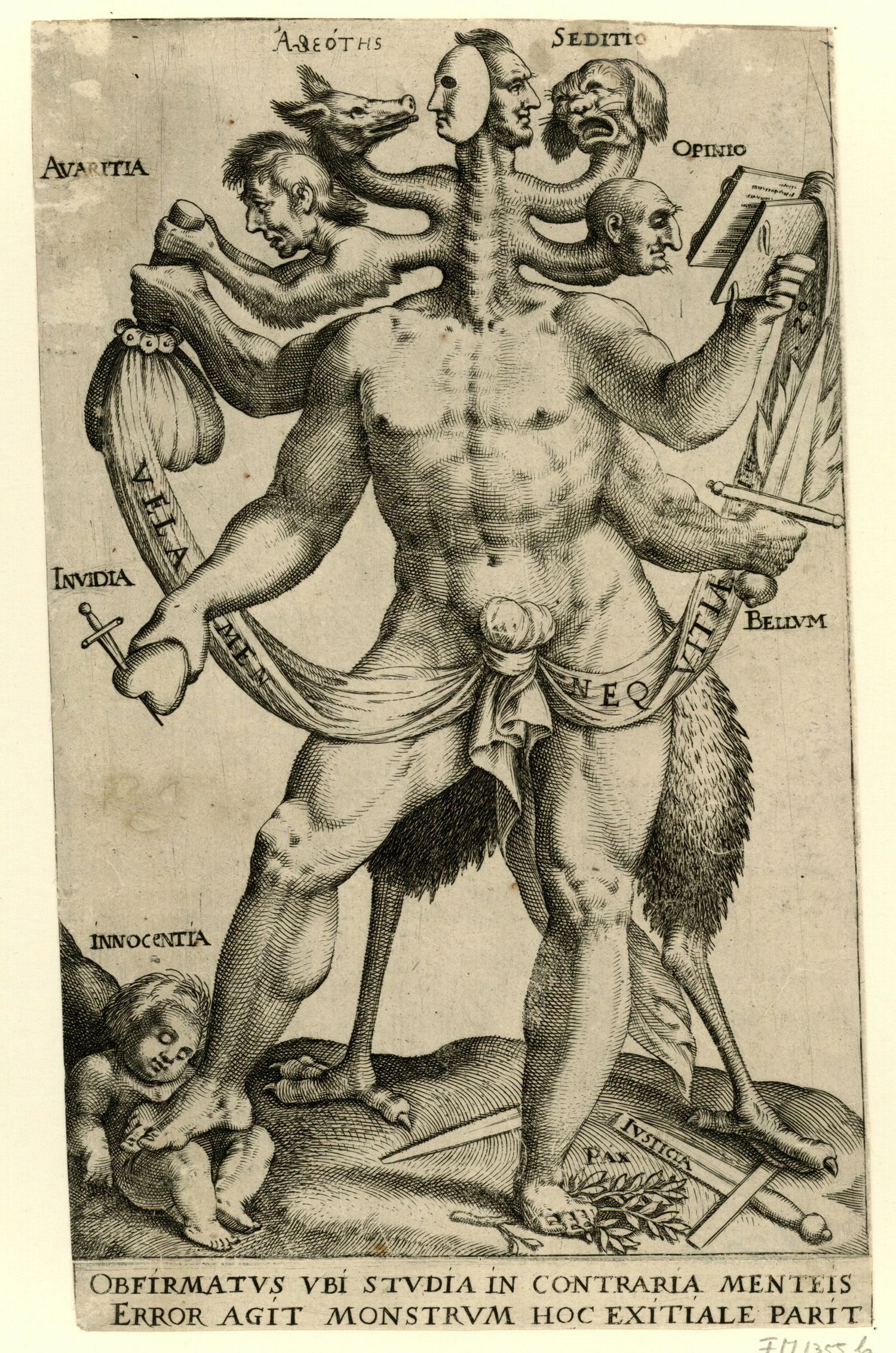
A polemical allegory represented as a five-headed monster, 1618

A monster is a type of imaginary or fictional creature found in literature, folklore, mythology, horror, fantasy, fiction and religion. They are very often depicted as dangerous and aggressive; with a strange or grotesque appearance that causes terror and fear, often in humans. Monsters usually resemble bizarre, deformed, otherworldly and mutated animals or entirely unique creatures of varying sizes, but may also take a human form; such as mutants, ghosts, spirits, vampires or zombies, among all other things. They may or may not have supernatural powers; but they are usually capable of killing or causing some form of destruction, threatening the social or moral order of the human world in the process.

Animal monsters are outside the moral order, but sometimes have their origin in some human violation of the moral law (e.g. in the Greek myth, Minos does not sacrifice to Poseidon the white bull which the god sent him, so as punishment Poseidon makes Minos' wife, Pasiphaë, fall in love with the bull. She copulates with the beast, and gives birth to the man with a bull's head, the Minotaur.) Human monsters are those who by birth were never completely human; such as Medusa and her Gorgon sisters or; who through some supernatural, or unnatural act lost their humanity; such as werewolves, Frankenstein's monster and so; who can no longer or; who never could follow the moral law of human society.

Monsters may also be depicted as misunderstood and friendly creatures who frighten individuals away without wanting to, or may be so large, strong and clumsy that they cause unintentional damage or death. Some monsters in fiction are depicted as mischievous and boisterous but not necessarily threatening; such as a sly goblin, while others may be docile but prone to becoming angry or hungry, thus needing to be tamed and taught to resist savage urges, or killed if they cannot be handled or controlled successfully.

Monsters pre-date written history, and the academic study of the particular cultural notions expressed in a society's ideas of monsters is known as monstrophy. Monsters have appeared in literature and in feature-length films. Well-known monsters in fiction include Dracula, Frankenstein's monster, werewolves, vampires, demons, reanimated mummies, and zombies.

== Etymology ==
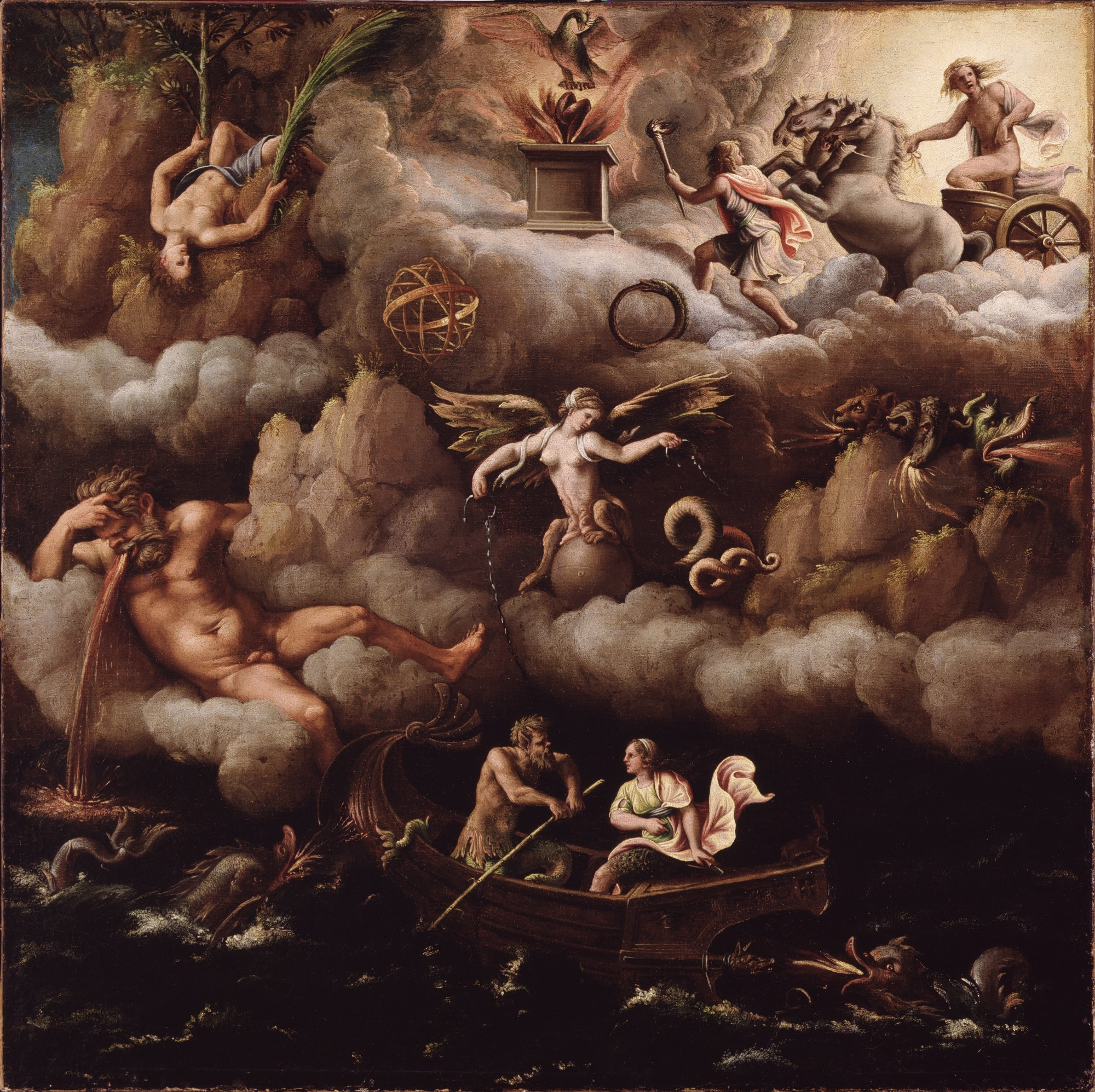
An Allegory of Immortality, c. 1540

Monster derives from the Latin monstrum, itself derived ultimately from the verb moneo ("to remind, warn, instruct, or foretell"), and denotes anything "strange or singular, contrary to the usual course of nature, by which the gods give notice of evil", "a strange, unnatural, hideous person, animal, or thing", or any "monstrous or unusual thing, circumstance, or adventure".

== Cultural heritage ==
In the words of Tina Marie Boyer, assistant professor of medieval German literature at Wake Forest University, "monsters do not emerge out of a cultural void; they have a literary and cultural heritage".

In the religious context of ancient Greeks and Romans, monsters were seen as signs of "divine displeasure", and it was thought that birth defects were especially ominous, being "an unnatural event" or "a malfunctioning of nature".

Monsters are not necessarily abominations however. The Roman historian Suetonius, for instance, describes a snake's absence of legs or a bird's ability to fly as monstrous, as both are "against nature". Nonetheless, the negative connotations of the word quickly established themselves, and by the playwright and philosopher Seneca's time, the word had extended into its philosophical meaning, "a visual and horrific revelation of the truth".

In spite of this, mythological monsters such as the Hydra and Medusa are not natural beings, but divine entities. This seems to be a holdover from Proto-Indo-European religion and other belief systems, in which the divisions between "spirit", "monster", and "god" were less evident.

== Monsters in fiction ==
=== Prose fiction ===
The history of monsters in fiction is long. For instance, Grendel in the epic poem Beowulf is an archetypal monster: deformed, brutal, and with enormous strength, he raids a human settlement nightly to slay and feed on his victims. The modern literary monster has its roots in examples such as the monster in Mary Shelley's Frankenstein and the vampire in Bram Stoker's Dracula.

Monsters are a staple of fantasy fiction, horror fiction, and science fiction (where the monsters are often extraterrestrial in nature). There also exists monster erotica, a subgenre of erotic fiction that involves monsters.

=== Film ===
==== Pre–World War II monster films ====
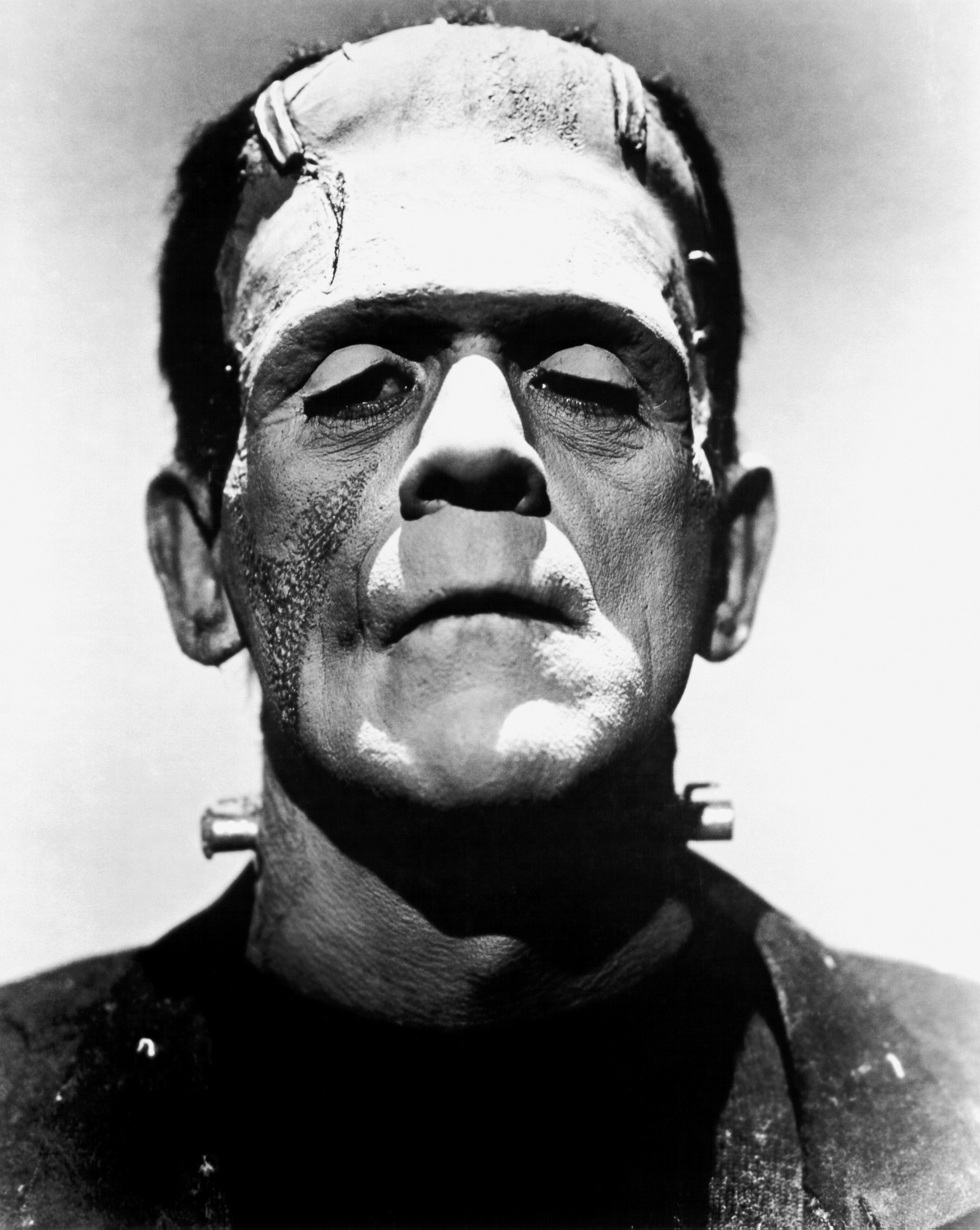
Hollywood's interpretation of Frankenstein's monster, played by Boris Karloff

During the age of silent films, monsters tended to be human-sized, e.g. Frankenstein's monster, the Golem, werewolves and vampires. The film Siegfried featured a dragon that consisted of stop-motion animated models, as in RKO's King Kong, the first giant monster film of the sound era.

Universal Studios specialized in monsters, with Bela Lugosi's reprisal of his stage role, Dracula, and Boris Karloff playing Frankenstein's monster. The studio also made several lesser films, such as Man-Made Monster, starring Lon Chaney Jr. as a carnival side-show worker who is turned into an electrically charged killer, able to dispatch victims merely by touching them, causing death by electrocution.

There was also a variant of Dr. Frankenstein, the mad surgeon Dr. Gogol (played by Peter Lorre), who transplanted hands that were reanimated with malevolent temperaments, in the film Mad Love.

Werewolves were introduced in films during this period. Mummies were cinematically depicted as fearsome monsters as well. As for giant creatures, the cliffhanger of the first episode of the 1936 Flash Gordon serial did not use a costumed actor, instead using real-life lizards to depict a pair of battling dragons via use of camera perspective. However, the cliffhanger of the ninth episode of the same serial had a man in a rubber suit play the Fire Dragon, which picks up a doll representing Flash in its claws. The cinematic monster cycle eventually wore thin, having a comedic turn in Abbott and Costello Meet Frankenstein (1948).

==== Post–World War II monster films ====
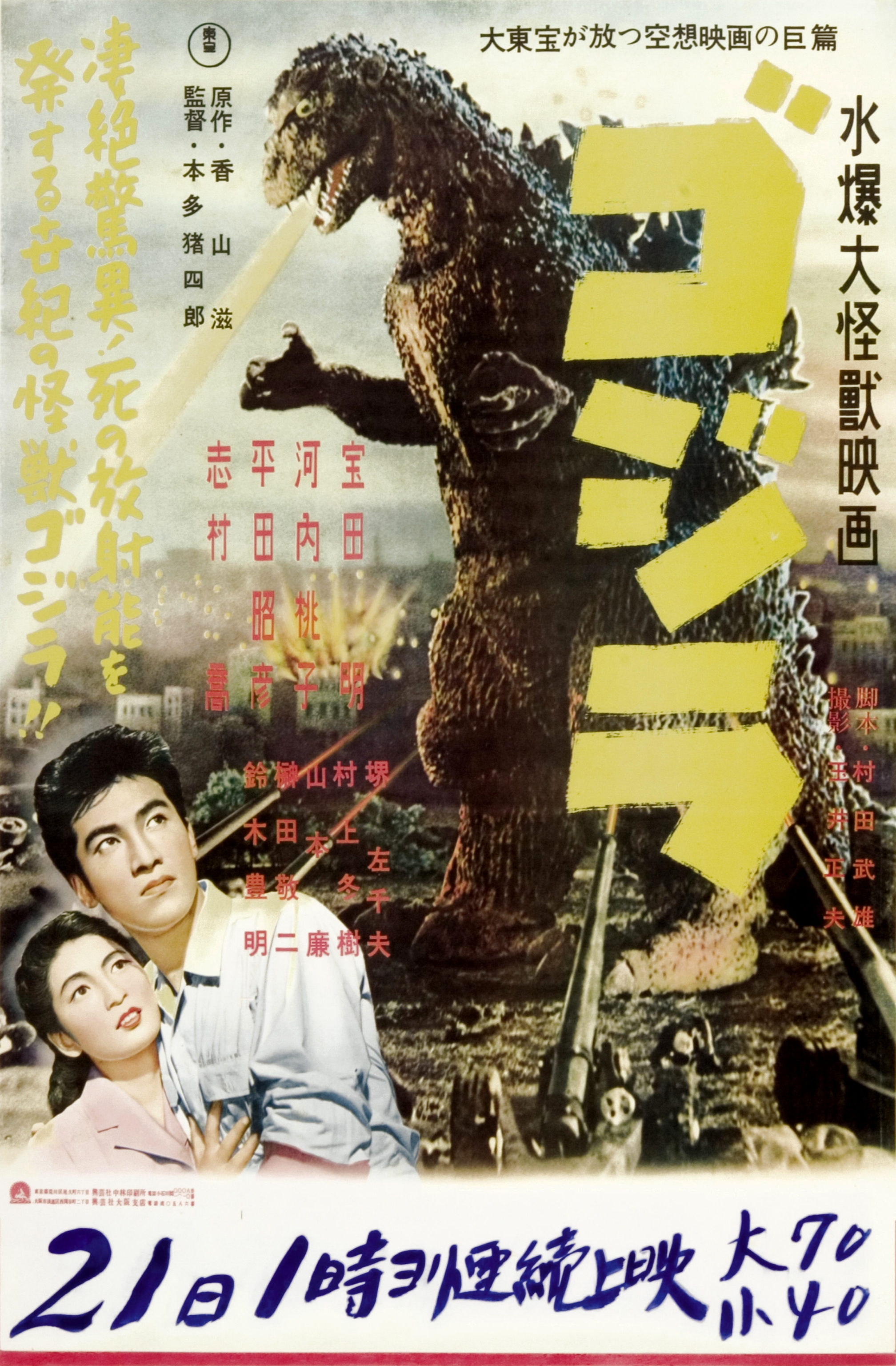
Original film poster for Godzilla (1954)

In the post–World War II era, however, giant monsters returned to the screen with a vigor that has been causally linked to the development of nuclear weapons. One early example occurred in the American film The Beast from 20,000 Fathoms, which was about a dinosaur that attacked a lighthouse. Subsequently, there were Japanese film depictions, (Godzilla, Gamera), British depictions (Gorgo), and even Danish depictions (Reptilicus), of giant monsters attacking cities. A recent depiction of a giant monster is depicted in J. J. Abrams's Cloverfield, which was released in theaters 18 January 2008. The intriguing proximity of other planets brought the notion of extraterrestrial monsters to the big screen, some of which were huge in size (such as King Ghidorah and Gigan), while others were of a more human scale. During this period, the fish-human monster Gill-man was developed in the film series Creature from the Black Lagoon.

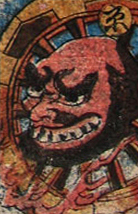
Card from the Japanese game obake karuta, c. early 19th century (Note: Each card features a monster from Japanese mythology and a character from the hiragana syllabary.)

Britain's Hammer Film Productions brought color to the monster movies in the late 1950s. Around this time, the earlier Universal films were usually shown on American television by independent stations (rather than network stations) by using announcers with strange personas, who gained legions of young fans. Although they have since changed considerably, movie monsters did not entirely disappear from the big screen as they did in the late 1940s.

Occasionally, monsters are depicted as friendly or misunderstood creatures. King Kong and Frankenstein's monster are two examples of misunderstood creatures. Frankenstein's monster is frequently depicted in this manner, in series and films such as Monster Squad and Van Helsing. The Hulk is an example of the "Monster as Hero" archetype. The theme of the "Friendly Monster" is pervasive in pop-culture. Chewbacca, Elmo, and Shrek are notable examples of friendly "monsters". In the Monsters, Inc. franchise by Pixar, the monster characters scare (and later entertain) children in order to create energy for running machinery in their home world, while the furry monsters of The Muppets and Sesame Street live in harmony with animals and humans alike. Japanese culture also commonly features monsters which are benevolent or likable, with the most famous examples being the Pokémon franchise and the pioneering anime My Neighbor Totoro. The book series/webisodes/toy line of Monster High is another example.

=== Games ===
Monsters are commonly encountered in fantasy or role-playing games, as well as video games, as enemies for players to fight against. They may include aliens, legendary creatures, extra-dimensional entities or mutated versions of regular animals.

Especially in role-playing games, "monster" is a catch-all term for hostile characters that are fought by the player. Sentient fictional races are usually not referred to as monsters. At other times, the term can carry a neutral connotation, such as in the Pokémon franchise, where it is used to refer to cute fictional creatures that resemble real-world animals. Characters in games may refer to all of such creatures as "monsters". Another role playing game that has many different fantasy creatures (monsters and dragons alike), is Dungeons & Dragons (see Monsters in Dungeons & Dragons).

In some other games, such as Undertale and Deltarune, "Monsters" (which are usually NPCs) refer to strange beings that are either undead, robots, humanoids or mythical creatures that share similarities with human beings.

== See also ==
=== Monsters in legend and fiction ===
- Abaia
- Alien
- Almas
- Aqrabuamelu
- Baba Yaga
- Bakunawa
- Banshee
- Basilisk
- Beast of Gévaudan
- Behemoth
- Bigfoot
- Bishop-fish
- Bogeyman
- Bunyip
- Centaur
- Cerberus
- Changeling
- Charybdis
- Chimera
- Chupacabra
- Churel
- Cryptozoology
- Cthulhu
- Cyclopes
- Cetus
- Cockatrice
- Demon
- Devil
- Draugr
- Dragon
- Dr. Jekyll and Mr. Hyde
- Evil clown
- Elemental
- Evil Piranha
- Evil Shark
- Elf
- Ent
- Fire-breathing monster
- Familiar
- Fairy
- Fearsome Critters
- Frankenstein
- Fouke Monster
- Gargoyle
- Gashadokuro
- Giant
- Gill-man
- Goblin
- Ghoul
- Ghost
- Gorgon
- Gremlin
- Grendel
- Griffin
- Grim Reaper
- Gnome
- Headless Horseman
- Horned Serpent
- Halfling
- Homunculus
- Hobgoblin
- Imp
- Invisible Man
- Hydra
- Jersey Devil
- Jiangshi
- Jinn
- Killer toy
- Kaiju
- Kappa
- Kelpie
- Kraken
- Krampus
- Kobold
- Kuntilanak
- Lake monster
- Loch Ness monster
- Legendary creature
- Leprechaun
- Leviathan
- Lich
- Manananggal
- Manticore
- Mapinguari
- Merfolk
- Mermaid
- Midgard Serpent
- Minokawa
- Minotaur
- Monster under the bed
- Mothman
- Merman
- Mutants
- Mummy
- Mythological hybrid
- Nymphs
- Ogre
- Oni
- Orc
- Parasites
- Pichal Peri
- Raksasa
- Scylla
- Sea monster
- Slime (monster)
- Siren
- Skin-walker
- Skeleton
- Spirit (supernatural entity)
- Swamp monster
- Tengu
- Therianthropes
- Tiamat
- Troll
- Tikbalang
- Typhon
- Undead
- Unicorn
- Vampire
- Warg
- Wendigo
- Werecats
- Werehyena
- Werewolf
- Witch
- Wild man
- Yaksha
- Yamata no Orochi
- Yaoguai
- Yeti
- Yōkai
- Yowie
- Yara-ma-yha-who
- Zombie

=== Related concepts ===
- Freak
