= Dobhar-chú =

Irish mythical creature

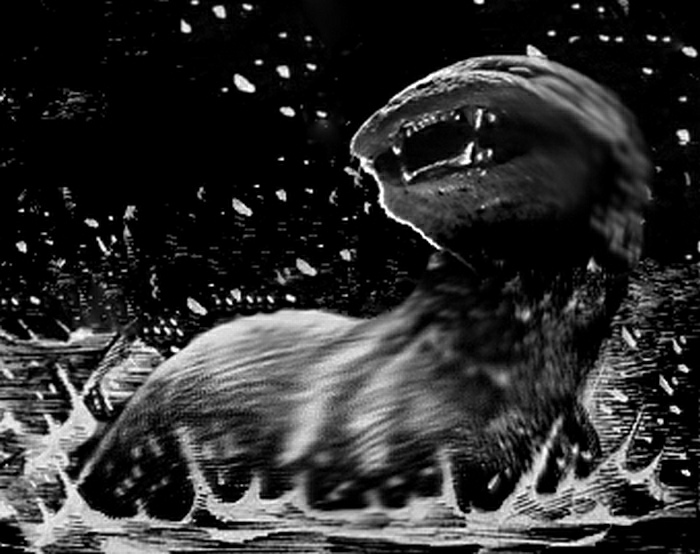
- Artist's impression

Creature information
- Other name(s): King otter, Water hound, Irish crocodile
- Grouping: Aquatic creature
- Sub grouping: Lake and river
- Folklore: Cryptid

Origin
- First attested: Lough Glenade
- Country: Ireland
- Details: Found in water

The Dobhar-chú (Irish pronunciation: [ˈd̪ˠoːɾˠxuː]; lit. 'water dog' or 'water hound'), or King otter, is a creature of Irish folklore. It resembles both a dog and an otter, though it sometimes is described as half dog, half fish. It is said to possess fur with protective properties and live in the water. Its legend has relied heavily on oral storytelling and tradition, and there have been little to no written records of the Dobhar-chú.

== Etymology ==
Dobharchú is one of the two most common Irish words for "otter". The modern Irish word for "water" is uisce (see whiskey), although dobhar is also used in placenames. Dobhar is a much older form and cognates are found in other Celtic languages (e.g. Welsh dŵr or dwfr, Cornish Dowrgi "waterhound/otter"). Cú is 'hound' in Irish, as with, for example, Cúchulainn ("Culainn's hound"). The Dobhar-chú is also known as the dobarcu, and anglicised as doyarchu, dhuragoo, dorraghow, or anchu.

== Description ==
The Dobhar-chú is described as resembling an otter, though about five times as large at 10–15 ft (3.0–4.6 m), with a white pelt, black ear tips, and a shape like a black cross on its back. Due to the murky waters it is said to reside in, its pelt may be portrayed as darker.

=== Headstone ===
A headstone, found in Congbháil (Conwall) Cemetery in Glenade, County Leitrim, depicts the Dobhar-chú. It is related to a story of an attack on a local woman by the creature. It is claimed that the headstone is that of the victim, purportedly killed by the Dobhar-chú in the 18th century.

The memorial consists of a single flag of sandstone, approximately 4.6 by 1.10 ft (1.40 by 0.34 m) in size, and depicts a recumbent animal with features characteristic of a canid with a tufted tail. The lettering and carving are in relief.

=== Legend ===
In 1722, Grace McGloighlin, locally known as Grace Connolly (her maiden name), lived in the townland of Creevelea at the north-west corner of Glenade Lough. One morning, she went down to the lough to wash some garments. Some accounts say that her husband, Terrence, rushed to the scene upon hearing her scream, while others claimed that he came to the shore after she had failed to return that evening. Both accounts assert that upon Mr. McGloighlin's arrival, he discovered her mutilated body with the Dobhar-chú sleeping on top. Terrence ran home and, bringing a dagger with him, killed the Dobhar-chú. As the beast died, it let out a whistling yell to its mate, who soon rose from the lough. The second beast chased him from the shore and, after a long and bloody battle, McGloighlin killed the second Dobhar-chú.

=== Cryptozoology ===
Sightings have been documented throughout the years, most recently in 2003. Irish artist Sean Corcoran and his wife claimed to have witnessed a Dobhar-chú on Omey Island in Connemara, County Galway. In his description, the large dark creature made a haunting screech, was capable of swimming rapidly, and possessed orange flipperlike feet.

== See also ==
- Ahuizotl (creature)
- Kelpie (Water Horse)
- Lake monster
- Lavellan
- Selkie
