= Seneca mythology =

Native American mythology

Seneca mythology refers to the mythology of the Onödowaʼga꞉ʼ (Seneca people), one of the six nations of the Haudenosaunee (Iroquois Confederacy) from the northeastern United States and Canada.

Most Seneca stories were transmitted orally, and began to be written down in the nineteenth century. The ethnologist Jeremiah Curtin began transcribing stories in 1883. In 1923, Arthur C. Parker published Seneca Myths and Folk Tales. Parker proposed eleven factors characterizing Seneca folklore:

- Spirits pervade all nature
- Good spirits are constantly making war upon evil spirits
- There is such a thing as orenda or magical power
- Any being possessing orenda may transform himself into any form
- All nature is conscious
- All living creatures have souls
- There is in the heaven world a Master of life and soul
- The spirits of departed men and animals wander over their familiar haunts
- Dreams are experiences of the soul as it leaves the body
- There are monsters that men seldom see
- There are such beings as wizards, witches and sorcerers

== Stories ==
Parker classifies the stories into six groups: "When the World was New", "Boys who Defied Magic and Overcame it", "Tales of Love and Marriage", "Horror Tales of Cannibals and Sorcerers", "Tales of Talking Animals", and "Tales of Giants, Pygmies, and Monster Bears".

== Figures ==
Some important figures in Seneca mythology are:

- Eagentci (Awëha꞉ʼi—Fertile Earth, Etinoʼëh), whose name translates as "ancient-bodied one", is the Earth-mother, or First Mother. Her Huron name is Atahensic.
- Djieien (jiʼä꞉yë꞉h) was a man-sized spider who survived most attacks because its heart was buried underground. He appears in the tale "Hagowanen and Otʿhegwenhda" and others.
- Djodiʼkwadoʼ (Jotéhkwatöh or Dzodéhgwadöh) is a horned serpent. He features in the stories "The Horned Serpent Runs Away with a Girl", and "The Great Serpent and the Young Wife". Horned Snake "is a monster serpent of the underwaters and his head is adorned with antlers of great spread.... He is capable of transforming himself to the appearance of a man, and as such delights in luring maidens to his abode. In a few instances he appears as the gallant rescuer of women marooned on bewitched islands."
- Dagwanoenyent (Dagwánöʼë꞉yën) is a vicious northern witch who is depicted as a whirlwind. Her child's father killed her.
- Gaasyendietha (Gá꞉šöje꞉taʼ) is a fire-breathing dragon that inhabits Lake Ontario. In human form he appears in "The Trials and Death of Inchworm", "Grandfather and Grandson and an Eagle Woman", "Tree Worm and his Mother-in-law, Barkworm", "Flying-Squirrel and the Seasons", among others.
- Hagondes ("long nose") is a cannibalistic trickster and clown spirit.
- Kaakwha (Gä꞉hgwa꞉ʼ, also Kanawha) is the solar deity and god of light and truth, subordinate to Hawenniyo, a fertility god.
- Dahdahwat (dá:dahwat) are animals who appear in dreams and visions.
- Gagqa (Gáʼga꞉ʼ) is the crow spirit.
- Awaeh Tegendji (or Yegondji)—"Swan Mother"—is an old woman who lives with her three beautiful daughters. She appears in "The Story of the Girls Who Went for a Husband".
- Gijesa are spirits of the night sky.
- Hadowe are the Haudenosaunee' equivalent of Dryads.
- Nyáʼgwaehe꞉h (also spelled Nyáʼkwaehe꞉h) is a giant hairless bear. Members of the Dewanondiisso꞉daikʼta꞉h (Pygmy Society) include the bones of Nyá'kwaehe꞉h in their charm bundles. He appears in the tales "How a Boy outwitted a Nyáʼkwaehe꞉h", "Nyá'kwaehe:h, the Mammoth Bear", and "The Boy and the Nyáʼkwaehe:h", and others. He "is the most feared of magic beasts and one of the most frequent among them to enter in to the fortunes of men. He loves to race and in various forms which he assumes, seeks to get men, and particularly boys, to bet their lives on the race, which generally lasts from sunrise to sunset. He has a vulnerable spot on the bottom of one of his feet and unless some hero hits this the monster does not die."

== See also ==
- Haudenosaunee mythology
