= M. F. M. Meiklejohn =

Professor of Italian at the University of Glasgow (1913–1974)

Matthew Fontaine Maury Meiklejohn (24 June 1913 – 14 May 1974) was an English professor of languages who held the Stevenson Chair for Italian studies at the University of Glasgow for twenty-five years. He was also a noted amateur ornithologist. It has been claimed that he was among the first "twitchers" who invented the idea of birding "life list".

Meiklejohn was born in Harpenden, Hertfordshire, where he took an early interest in natural history and went to Gresham's School, Holt, and then to Oriel College at Oxford with a scholarship and graduated with first class honours in French and Italian in 1934. He then moved to Merton College (1936–1938) with a Harmsworth Scholarship. He was influenced by many ornithologists including David Lack, Hugh Elliot, James Fisher, and Wilfred Backhouse Alexander. He then went to teach at Cape Town University and joined the South African army and worked to gather intelligence in Kenya, Egypt and Italy. He worked at the British Council in Teheran after the war.

He taught Italian at Leeds before being the Stevenson Chair of Italian at Glasgow University. He died after a brief illness and on his request, his ashes were scattered on the Isle of May, his favourite haunt for bird study.

He published many notes on birds from the age of fourteen. In later life he examined the Dante's knowledge of ornithology and studied Emperor Frederick II's De Arte Venandi cum Avibus. He also ran a very popular column of lighter writing in the Glasgow Herald under the initials MFMM. This series ran from 1951 to 1974 and included more than a thousand articles. He is also famous for his humorous hoax on the bare-fronted hoodwink (Dissimulatrix spuria) published in Bird Notes in 1950.
