= Chalkydri =

Legendary creatures from the Jewish apocrypha

Creature information
- Grouping: Legendary creature
- Sub grouping: Hybrid

Chalkydri (Ancient Greek: χαλκύδραι khalkýdrai, compound of χαλκός khalkós "brass, copper" + ὕδρα hýdra "hydra", "water-serpent" — lit. "brazen hydras", "copper serpents") are mythical creatures mentioned in the apocryphal Second Book of Enoch (1st century CE), often considered an angelic species. In the narrative, chalkydri dwell near the Sun, running its course around the Earth and bringing heat and dew. The chalkydri and phoenixes are described as creatures 900 measures in size, with the head of a crocodile, the feet and tail of a lion, twelve wings, and a coloration like the rainbow. Both are referred to as "flying elements of the Sun" in the Second Book of Enoch. At sunrise, all chalkydri break into song with their counterparts, signalling the birds of the world to rejoice at the new day.

The name is interpreted as a Greek translation of the Hebrew word "Nehushtan", the bronze serpent constructed by Moses to protect the Israelites from attacks by fiery flying serpents in the wilderness, and later destroyed by King Hezekiah as idolatrous.

Similarities to the story of the chalkydri and phoenixes in the Second Book of Enoch appear in the Greek Apocalypse of Baruch, which recounts the story of Baruch seeing a large bird flying around the Sun said to guard the Earth, identified by an angel as a phoenix.

== See also ==
- List of angels in theology
- List of hybrid creatures in folklore
