= Grootslang =

South African legendary creature

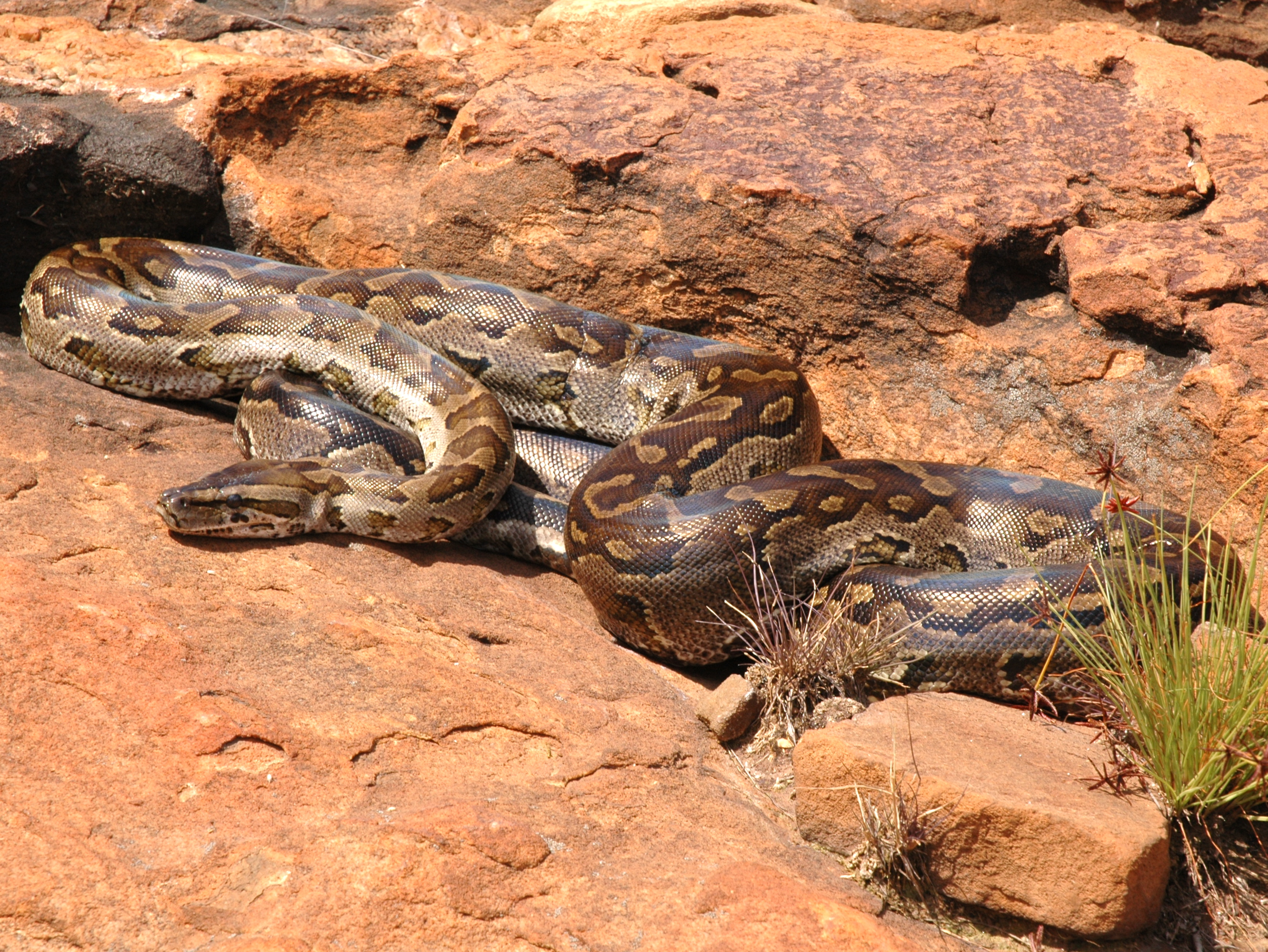
- Python natalensis, possible origin of the Grootslang myth.

Creature information
- Other name: Great Snake of the Orange River
- Grouping: Legendary creature
- Sub grouping: Reptiles, Serpents and Worms
- Similar entities: Irizima, Mokele-mbembe

Origin
- Country: South Africa
- Region: Richtersveld
- Details: Caves, rivers

The Grootslang or Grote Slang (Afrikaans and Dutch for "big snake") is a legendary creature that is reputed to dwell in a deep cave in the Richtersveld, South Africa.

== Appearance ==
The Grootslang is described as a massive serpent measuring between 40–50 feet (12–15 m) in length, whose track stretches to a width of 3 feet (0.91 m). Some legends describe it as having diamonds in its eye sockets.

In media from the 21st century onwards, depictions of the Grootslang have commonly adopted features of elephants, including a trunked and tusked head or four legs. This originates from author Carol Rose describing the Grootslang as being as big as an elephant, as well as conflation with other African legends of semi-aquatic monsters such as the Mokele-mbembe.

== Legend ==
The Grootslang is said to dwell in a cave known as the "Wonder Hole" or "Bottomless Pit" located in the Richtersveld, which is said to connect to the sea 64 kilometres (40 mi) away. According to local legend, the cave is filled with diamonds, and is sometimes described as connecting instead to the Orange River by a natural pipe through which the diamonds are gradually funneled into the current. The cave projects directly downward for 60 feet (18 m) until it comes to a steep incline, after which secondary passages branch off. South African journalist and author Lawrence G. Green describes the Wonder Hole as being located 3 miles (4.8 km) from the Orange River, near the Annisfontein spring, and that native folklore describes two white men as having descended into the cave to retrieve "stones that sparkled like fire", although explorers who followed in their lead reportedly uncovered no such geological samples, with Green attesting that subsequent expeditions "found nothing more valuable than quantities of bat guano." Another account describes only one person as entering the Wonder Hole and returning. This was a prospector who used a cable winch to descend into the earth until he reached a ledge. There, he reportedly witnessed tunnels leading further in and smelled a strong scent of sulfur, but dropped his electric torch when bats flew towards him and had to be pulled back up. He did not descend into the cave again.

A large pool beneath the King George Cataract at Aughrabies Falls is also said to be a lair of the Grootslang and a source of diamonds. Here, the creature is reputed to be coiled around a great hoard of gold and gems. According to a version of the story relayed by Jon Manchip White, reportedly told by the Bushmen, the Grootslang is older than the world and will protect its treasure for eternity. Another form of the myth states that the Grootslang is a spirit tasked with guarding its cavern from treasure seekers, and that its presence is marked by an overpowering "sense of evil".

In The Glamour of Prospecting, the South African gold prospector F. C. Cornell describes the "Groot Slang" as a large snake said to live within a large rock in the middle of the Orange River, and to take cattle from the river's banks. Belief in this creature is described as ubiquitous among the local Khoekhoe (described by Cornell as "Richtersfeld Hottentots") and some white settlers, who greatly fear the serpent.

While searching for treasure in the Richtersveld of South Africa in 1917, the English businessman Peter Grayson disappeared after members of his party were attacked and injured by lions, prompting rumours that the Grootslang had killed him.

One unverified myth spread online tells of the Grootslang being created by either gods or God at the dawn of creation, but the Grootslang was so powerful and destructive that they split the creature into pythons and elephants, but one escaped.

== Origin ==
In Where Men Still Dream, South African journalist and author Lawrence G. Green speculates that the legend of the Grootslang originated from sightings of native pythons, which can reach 25 feet (7.6 m) in length. Additional details of the myth, such as its size in excess of real pythons and diamonds in the creature's eye sockets, are dismissed by Green as narrative exaggerations.

== In popular culture ==
- A Grootslang is featured in The Secret Saturdays episode "Something in the Water". It is depicted as a four-tusked, green-skinned elephant with ram-like horns and a spiked, snake-like tail. The Saturdays have to relocate a Grootslang away from settlements by baiting it with a large piece of pork.
- A Grootslang is featured in Lumberjanes vol. 3 as a creature creating a massive snowstorm threatening the camp.
- In Kingdom Rush: Origins, in the stage The Crystal Lake, a Grootslang appears in the crystal river. It uses its breath to crystallize towers.
- In Wynncraft, the Minecraft-based MMORPG features Grootslangs in the raid Nest of the Grootslangs.
