= Aguara =

Mythological fox

Aguara is a mythological fox in Ava Guaraní and Chané mythology.

In oral traditions, Aguara is suffixed with tunpa ('sacred') and called Aguara-tunpa. Aguara is a trickster, sometimes described as malignant, though it also plays the part of a cultural hero. For example, Aguara is credited with stealing algarroba seeds from the Viscacha, along with capturing Vulture and demanding rubber as a ransom, thus creating rubber for mankind. He is featured in many myths with his rival Tatu-tunpa, a mythological armadillo, whom Aguara ultimately kills. Aguara frequently interacted with human beings, tricking them and having beautiful women bear his children.

Aguara is associated with the constellation Scorpius, and the "bend" of the scorpion's tail was said to be his farming corral.
