= Gallinipper (mythology) =

Cryptid in the African-American folk tradition

Creature information
- Grouping: Cryptid
- Folklore: African-American folktales

Origin
- Country: America

The gallinipper is a cryptid in the African-American folk tradition. These creatures were said to be a species of giant mosquitoes so big that their bones could fence a 140-acre (57 ha) field. A popular telling of the legends has the creature get its bill out of a tree trunk, with the animal being large enough to clear 140 acres of land during the struggle. Gallinipper tales were appropriated as a feature of minstrel shows, but have also appeared in American blues songs such as "Mosquito Moan" by Blind Lemon Jefferson [Paramount 12899], 1929.
