= Basan (legendary bird) =

Fictional bird

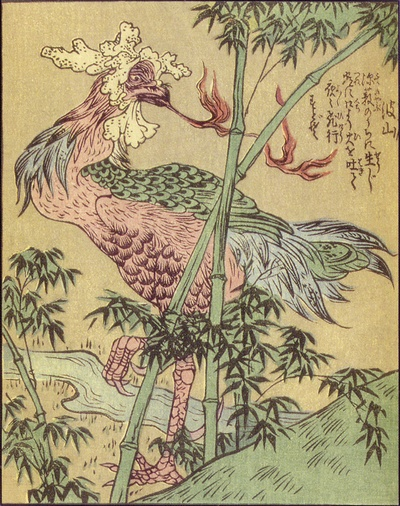
The basan as depicted in Takehara Shunsen's Ehon Hyaku Monogatari

The Basan (波山), alternatively referred to as Basabasa (婆娑婆娑) or Inuhōō (犬鳳凰), is a fowl-like bird with origins stemming from Japanese mythology and folklore and illustrated in Takehara Shunsen's Ehon Hyaku Monogatari and the Gazu Hyakki Yagyō.

== Characteristics ==
=== Appearance ===
Basan has an appearance similar to a chicken the size of a turkey. They are recognized by their bright red comb and brilliant-colored plumage which appear like tongues of flame. Their notable feature is their breath which flows visibly from their mouth like a dragon's fire.

However, the flame gives off no heat, nor does it ignite combustible material. (It is said to breathe ghost fire from its beak which is not hot but a cold fire that glows.)

=== Behavior ===
Basan inhabits bamboo groves and is entirely nocturnal, found only in the mountains of Iyo Province (伊予国) (present-day Ehime Prefecture (愛媛県)) on the Japanese island of Shikoku (四国).

Even though Basan lives far from human activity, their diet consists of charred wood and embers, so they venture around remote villages at night to eat on the remaining bonfires or charcoal.

When pleased or startled, Basan will flap their wings creating the rustling “Basabasa” sound.

== Mythology ==
It is said to live in the mountains of Iyo Province (today Ehime Prefecture). According to the description on the illustration, it resembles a large chicken and breathes ghost-fire from its mouth. It is described as having a bright red cockscomb and spits an equally brilliant-hued fire. The fire is a cold fire, a glow, and it does not burn.

It usually lives in the bamboo groves of mountain recesses but sometimes materializes in human villages late at night. When the Basan flaps its wings, an eerie rustling ("basa basa") sound can be heard. The alias (‘Basabasa’) comes from the sound of the flapping wings. Supposedly, if a human hears the sound and looks outside, the bird's form will suddenly vanish. It is sometimes depicted with blue hackles and claws, green regimes and sickle feathers, and a red body. It is also sometimes called the "Fire Rooster".

== Origin ==
Information about Basan was provided in two collections of descriptions and illustrations of ghosts, monsters, and spirits written in the Edo period (江戸時代, Edo Jidai).

This bird was first mentioned in 1776, in Toriyama Sekien's (Japanese 鳥山石燕, Toriyama Sekien) book entitled Illustrated Night Parade of a Hundred Demons (Japanese 画図百鬼夜行, Gazu Hyakki Yagyō).

Basan was described again in 1841, in the third volume of the Picture Book of One Hundred Stories (絵本百物語, Ehon Hyaku Monogatari) illustrated by Takehara Shunsensai (Japanese: 竹原春泉斎, Takehara Shunsensai). In addition to Basan, this work also described and illustrated Japanese mythological creatures such as Shinigami (Japanese: 死神, Shinigami), Isonade (Japanese: 磯撫で Isonade), Adzuki-arai (Japanese: 小豆洗沙 Azuki-arai) and others (Takehara, 2006).

The concept of a fire-breathing chicken isn't entirely original, as the Basan bears similarities to the Cockatrice, a European creature often portrayed as capable of breathing fire and linked to the Basilisk.

== In popular culture ==
- The Pokémon family of Torchic, Combusken, and Blaziken are based on the Basan, as well as Magmar.
- In the modern period, Basan and other Japanese mythological creatures have been described in several publications or special thematic book series, such as "Gensō sekai no jūnin tachi" (Japanese: 幻年世界住人体). For example, Tada Katsumi (Japanese: 多田 克己 Tada Katsumi) in "Genso sekai no junin-tachi 4" issue published in 1990, while describing Basan, mentioned another alternative version of this creature's name - Inuhoo (Tada, 1990).

== See also ==
- Cockatrice
