= Alicante (mythology) =

Mythical Mexican snake

The Alicante (Latin American Spanish pronunciation: [,a.li'kan.te]) is a mythical Mexican snake. It is also sometimes known as the hoop snake or cuatro narices.

== Folklore ==
The alicante appears similar to regular snakes, only without any teeth. It is also sometimes described as having four noses, which is where the name cuatro narices comes from. Alicante are said to sneak up to a mother with her baby while she is sleeping and suck the milk from her, leaving none left for the infant. If the mother is awake, it will hypnotize her to sleep. The alicante puts the tip of its tail in the baby's mouth for them to suckle on so they stay quiet, leaving sores on the baby's mouth or sometimes suffocating them. If caught by a third party it will put its own tail in its mouth and spin rapidly through the room as it tries to escape. Alicante will also feed on cows milk, and are able to hypnotize animals in the same way they do people.

Medieval Europe had a snake legend much like that of the alicante, save for that the snakes preferred to drink wine and would only drink milk if no alcohol was available. Most other aspects of the myth, including how it would pacify the baby with its tail, are identical.

=== Reports ===
A story of an alicante was relayed in 1975 by a woman named Chelo C. She says that in 1934-5, when she was young, her aunt had just had a baby. This aunt was targeted while she was taking a nap under a tree on the family farm. Her husband saw the alicante latched to her and tried to rip it off, but its grip was so strong that it ripped off her breast with it, and she died.

== Sources ==
- Cardozo-Freeman, Inez (1978). "Serpent Fears and Religious Motifs among Mexican Women". Frontiers: A Journal of Women Studies. 3 (3): 10–13. doi:10.2307/3346321. ISSN 0160-9009.
- Garcia, Lionel G. (1 January 1994). I Can Hear the Cowbells Ring. Arte Publico Press. ISBN 978-1-61192-179-3.
