= Bare-fronted Hoodwink =

Fictional, satirical species of bird

The Bare-fronted Hoodwink (Dissimulatrix spuria) was a hoax and satirical wastebasket species of bird created by ornithologist M. F. M. Meiklejohn.

The Hoodwink has the ability to be "almost seen" or "almost captured". Bird watchers can easily identify this bird by its "blurred appearance and extremely rapid flight away from the observer." Meiklejohn claimed that the single species could easily account for every bird not completely sighted.

Birdwatchers added this species to their list of birds to watch for, and amateurs seemed to sight the Hoodwink more often.

On 1 April 1975, the bird was put on display at the Royal Scottish Museum at Edinburgh. The exhibit also included photos of blurry birds flying away. The bird was created using the head of a carrion crow, the body of a plover, and the feet of an unknown waterfowl. The bare front appeared to be wax.

Meiklejohn's paper was published in the scientific journal Bird Notes in 1950. The paper was rather long and humorous, and he even claimed the genus to be a descendant of an ancient species Paleodissimulatrix.
