= Zapam Zucum =

South American folklore deity

Zapam Zucum or Zapam-zucún is a voluptuous, dark-skinned, and white-handed goddess among the Aymara and Diaguita populations of northerly parts of Argentina and Chile as well as Bolivia. She is considered the protectoress of the algarrobo tree (Prosopis spp., conventionally translated as "carob" (Note: Here algarrobo refers to Prosopis species. In Martín's Spanish text, while the plant name algarrobo alone is ambiguous, the text mentions beverages e.g.)).

== Legend ==
Among the Aymara, whose population dwell in La Rioja Province in the Argentine Northwest, Bolivia, and northern Chile, the algarrobo tree ("carob") is held sacred. The algarrobo tree (produces pods and beans) which can be made to into a sweet loaf (torta) called patay, or made into flour for baking, as well as being brewed into different kinds of beverages. (Note: The aloja is a fermented alcoholic drink, while añapa is a sweet juice or soft drink. There is also the arrope, also known as miel de algarrobo "honey of the algarrobo", pp which is another beverage.)

According to the storytelling, while the women labor in the fields, the children are kept in the custody of the tree and nap in the tree's shades. If the goddess inhabits the tree, the sound of "Zapam... Zucum" can be heard, and the children stave their hunger for some reason. The babysitting goddess can materialize in the form of a dark-skinned, (Note: Spanish: morena) bare-naked beautiful lady, and will feed (breast-feed) the children in need or those who start crying. She has long black hair and black eyes, but supple white hand of a skin-tone different from her general dark complexion. With those hands she will craft a cradle out of leaves and tuck in the toddlers to nap. Her breasts are enormous, and makes the aforesaid "Zapam... Zucum" sound when she maneuvers, hence her name.

The goddess is the guardian of the sacred algarrobo tree, and when she hears the "chac.. chac" noise of someone chopping at the tree with an ax, she will relentlessly abduct the logger to who knows where. In a variant telling, the logger's children get spirited away.

The goddess protects baby and juvenile animals from predatory beasts and hunters, and according to José Zanardi (2019), metes out punishment particularly for killing the vicuña and stealing its children, (Note: However, according to other sources, Coquena (sometimes said to be Pachamama's consort) is the Diaguita-Calchaquí deity who protects vicuña, llama and other camelids. The Aymara believe in the Yastay/Llastay to be protector of vicuña, condor, and other alpine animals.) Sometimes she will wreak vengeance upon evil and abusive men by seducing and suffocating them. In some regions, it is told how she will appear in gigantic form to hunt down lazy men who have loafed off of working in the fields, capture the men with her enormous breasts, and carry them off somewhere.

The lore of this dark-skinned, small, white-handed, and large-breasted goddess also occurs among the Diaguita (of the Argentine Northwest and Norte Chico "little north" part of Chile).

== See also ==
- List of legendary creatures by type#Creatures associated with plants
