= Yacuruna =

Mythical race of aquatic people living in underwater cities in the Amazon Basin

The Yacuruna are a mythical water people of the Amazon basin who live in beautiful underwater cities, often at the mouths of rivers. Belief in the Yacuruna is most prominently found among indigenous people of the Amazon. The term is derived from the Quechua language, yaku ("water") and runa ("man").

== Characteristics ==
The Yacuruna is described as being hairy with a backward-facing head and deformed feet. Illustrations depict the Yacuruna as a man-like creature accompanied by a serpent and riding a crocodile. It is considered by many to be a god who has the power to change into an attractive man.

The Yacuruna roam the Amazon rainforest at night using black crocodiles as canoes. During the day they sleep at the bottoms of rivers and lakes with one eye open. They have the ability to communicate with aquatic animals of the Amazon and to maintain ultimate control over them. Locals believe that Yacuruna can transform into Amazon river dolphins, which are attracted to the odor of blood in menstruating women. Once such a woman is found, a Yacuruna will transform into a handsome and alluring man and use aphrodisiacs to kidnap her, bringing her into his kingdom in the depths of the river.

== Underwater cities ==
Yacuruna are said to inhabit underwater cities that mirror upside-down human cities. The cities can be interpreted as reflections on the surface of the water. Within the city, the Yucuruna live in palaces of crystal with multicolored walls of fish scales and pearl, reclining on hammocks of feathers under a mosquito net of butterfly wings. The hammocks are snakes, with turtles for seats.

== Abduction ==
Yacuruna can be characterized as dangerous spirits who lure humans into the water by taking on human forms. When people of the Amazonian community disappear and do not return such as fishermen, husbands, and young girls (who become mysteriously pregnant), it is often assumed that they have been seduced and captured by the Yacuruna.

The abducted victims gradually transform into yacuruna: first, their eyes turn to resemble the Yacuruna, then their head and feet turn backward so that they cannot find their way home, and must continue onwards to the underwater city. Transformation is irreversible and a victim may never return to his or her home.

Don Juan Flores Salazar describes a story of how his little sister was taken by a Yacuruna. One day she was swimming when she was pulled underwater and vanished. It was not until years later when he saw her again, still alive but had transformed into a mermaid. She had married a Yacuruna, and gained knowledge in becoming a healer of the waters. They complemented one another for he was a healer of the lands: he believed it was her destiny to become a Yacuruna.

== Shamanism ==
A Yacuruna can be summoned by a shaman to act as a familiar. It may pass on healing knowledge to a sick person or shaman, and in this way they establish trust. Once trust has been established, the Yacuruna will turn the person's head towards the front again, allowing the individual to return to the human world. A yacuruna can be the source of shamanic powers, becoming a powerful ally to the shaman.

== See also ==
- Tsunki
- Kelpie
- Neck (water spirit)
