= Shug Monkey =

Monster from Cambridgeshire

Coordinates: 52.14408°N 0.33334°E

In the folklore of Cambridgeshire, the Shug Monkey is a creature that shares features of a dog and monkey, which reportedly haunted Slough Hill Lane (a street that leads from the village of West Wratting to nearby Balsham). The creature, believed to have the body of a jet-black shaggy sheepdog and the face of a monkey with staring eyes, was believed to be a supernatural ghost or demon. Local writer and broadcaster James Wentworth Day, who first related stories of the Shug Monkey in Here Are Ghosts and Witches (1954), described it as a curious variation of Black Shuck, while local folklorist Polly Howat suggests that both share common origins in Norse mythology.

According to Howat, sightings of the Shug Monkey have not been reported since before World War II.
