= Ernest Ruckle =

American painter

Ernest Ruckle (May 1, 1940 - May 2018) was an American artist noted for his elaborately structured paintings.

== Life and work ==
He was born in Neptune, New Jersey, US. Ruckle attended elementary schools in Florida and Georgia, and high school in New Jersey. At Rutgers University, he at first majored in biology, but later switched to English literature and specialized in literary criticism. His most influential teachers were Francis Fergusson and Paul Fussell.

After getting his degree, he became a professional artist in 1963. He soon started to produce paintings in formal perspective with huge crowds of people and parodies of complex machinery. His first one-man show was at the Studio Gallery Workshop in New York City in 1966. (His tenth New York one-man show was in 2005 at the Louis K. Meisel Gallery.)

Between 1966 and 1969, Ruckle developed an original flat style influenced by Cubism and Futurism with an unusual perspective system, perhaps influenced by Persian miniatures. Beginning around 1975 he began to use more than one style in a work and to use variation in style as a structural device.

He died in May 2018 in Waterford, Ireland.

== Notable works ==
- The People Factory (1965) is an early example of Ruckle's work using conventional perspective.
- Watch-Fleas (1966) is an early experiment with a flat style.
- The Cosmogenitor (1975) is a triptych using a different style in each panel.
- The Square (1983) is the first of a series of large triptychs. It's a return to conventional perspective.
- The EuroDisney Triptych (1998) gradually changes in style from left to right, mirroring the change in action.
