= Lavellan =

Scottish folkloric creature

In Scottish folklore, the lavellan, làbh-allan, la-mhalan, or la-bhallan is a rodent- or lizard-like creature with a venomous bite. It reportedly lives in bodies of water. It features in tales from both Sutherland and Caithness.

The lavellan was described in Robert Sibbald's Scotia Illustrata as "an animal common in Caithness, it stays in water, it has a head similar to the weasel, and is a beast of the same colouring. The breath from these beasts does harm." In the settlement of Ausdale, Thomas Pennant asked the local people about the lavellan. They reportedly believed that the lavellan was particularly harmful to cattle, and also asserted that sick cattle could be cured by giving them water in which the skinned hide of a lavellan had been dipped. Pennant posited that the mythical lavellan was, in actuality, a water shrew (Neomys fodiens). According to researcher Lee Raye, Pennant's view is now generally accepted as accurate.

In literature, the lavellan was mentioned in a poem by Sutherland poet Rob Donn: "Let him not go away from the houses, to moss or wood, lest the Lavellan come and smite him."

== See also ==
- Dobhar-chu
- Kelpie
