= Tulugaak =

Inuit deity

In Inuit mythology, Tulugaak was the creator of light. The meaning of tulugaq is 'raven'; cf. the god Tuluŋigraq ("something like a raven").

Sometimes related to other sky gods, like Torngarsuk and Anguta from Inuit pantheon.
