= Bake-kujira =

Mythical Japanese Yōkai

Bake-kujira (化鯨, "ghost whale"), also known as Hone-kujira (骨鯨, "bone whale"), is a yōkai in Japanese folklore, typically depicted as the skeletal remains of a whale appearing at sea on stormy nights. It is most closely associated with coastal regions of western Japan, particularly the Shimane Peninsula. The Bake-kujira is generally interpreted as a vengeful spirit of a whale, embodying resentment toward humans involved in whaling

== Folklore ==
The legend of the Bake-kujira took place in Shimane Peninsula in Izumo Province (present-day northeastern Shimane Prefecture) at a time when whales were still often caught in the Sea of Japan, a region known in antiquity as the "Sea of Whales."

On one rainy evening, a large, white figure began to approach the coast from offshore. Looking closely, the fishermen realized that it appeared to take the shape of a whale and set off on their boats toward the figure for a regular fishing expedition. However, no matter how many harpoons they threw, their prey was unperturbed.

The fishermen thought this was unusual and, upon closer inspection, the figure that originally appeared to be prey took the shape of only the white skeleton of a baleen whale, with no skin or flesh to be seen.

The area filled with oddly-shaped fish, and strange birds appeared right before the fishermen's eyes, but as the tide receded, the creatures retreated without incident far out to sea.

The fishermen began to tell tales of the creature, claiming it to have been the vengeful ghost of a dead whale. Since then, the Bake-kujira was never seen again.

In the spring of 1983, stories of the Bake-kujira resurfaced when a large skeleton-like object was pulled up from 500 meters offshore at Maenami Fishing Port in Anamizu, Hōsu District, Ishikawa Prefecture; it was called Hone Kujira (骨鯨; bone whale) by the media. The skeleton, however, was altogether 5 meters long and between 50 and 150 centimeters thick; a local fishing chief said that if it was truly a whale's skeleton, it would be 100 meters long.

== Modern appearances ==
While drawing scenes for a kamishibai about Bake-kujira in the 1950s, Shigeru Mizuki, a manga artist who was known for yōkai manga, suddenly developed a high fever and gave up on the project. In one of Mizuki's later books, he wrote that he thought he might have been possessed by Bake-kujira at the time. Bake-kujira later appeared in the fourth “Gegege no Kitarō” anime and in the manga “Thousand Yōkai Tales.” In both depictions, Bake-kujira helped Kitarō and his friends as a holy and virtuous being. However, Hiroshi Hashimoto, one of the script writers in charge of Bake-kujira's first appearance in the anime, said that he was worried he might be possessed like Mizuki. However, in “Bessatsu Shinpyō: The World of Shigeru Mizuki,” it was said that it was during the production of Bake-garasu (化けガラス, ghost crow), not Bake-kujira, that he suffered from a high fever.

In addition to Mizuki's experience, there are many legends about whales in the Oki region of Shimane Prefecture. After a whale washed ashore in Oki's Chibu Bay in Meiwa 1 (1764), a series of disasters including fires and epidemics occurred. This was thought to be due to the wrath of a whale, and a hand dance designed to comfort the spirit of the whale is said to have now been transformed into a kabuki performance, performed in conjunction with the festival at Amasashihiko-no-mikoto (Ikkū) Shrine in Chibu Village, held every even-numbered year on the last weekend of July.

== In popular culture ==
- Bake-kujira is a playable character in Smite.
