= Akhlut =

Creature in Inuit mythology

In Inuit folklore, the kăk-whăn’-û-ghăt kǐg-û-lu’-nǐk or akh’lut is an orca-like composite animal that takes the form of a wolf when on land, and is sometimes depicted as a wolf-orca hybrid.

== Inuit folklore ==
In 1900, the American naturalist Edward William Nelson described the kăk-whăn’-û-ghăt kǐg-û-lu’-nǐk among a number of other mythical and composite animals:

It is described as being similar in form to the killer whale and is credited with the power of changing at will to a wolf; after roaming about over the land it may return to the sea and again become a whale. While in the wolf form it is known by the above name, and the Eskimo say they know that this change takes place as they have seen wolf tracks leading to the edge of the sea ice and ending at the water, or beginning at the edge of the water and leading to the shore. ... These animals are said to be very fierce and to kill men.

Nelson attributed stories of the creature to the orca (akh’lut), and explained wolf tracks appearing to lead into the sea as the result of ice breaking away from the edge. He identifies other composite animals among Inuit folklore, including a white whale that can transform into a reindeer, and says that belief in the kăk-whăn’-û-ghăt kǐg-û-lu’-nǐk is prevalent among Inuit along the shore of the Bering Sea.

More recent collections of myths and folklore have used the term Nelson gives for the orca, akh’lut, to describe the composite animal.

== See also ==
- Kelpie
- Selkie
- Gonakadet
