= Djieien =

Mythological spider

In Seneca mythology, Djieien (jiʼä꞉yë꞉h IPA: [d͡ʒiʔæːjẽːh]) is a monstrous spider six feet tall. It could not be killed because it had hidden its heart underground. The great hero Othegwenhda (Hiawatha) discovered Dijien's heart and so killed it.

Djieien figures in the tale of Hagowanen and Ot'hegwenhda.
