= Tizheruk =

Snake-like creature in Inuit mythology

In Inuit religion, the Tizheruk is a mythical large serpent-like creature that is said to inhabit the waters near Key Island, Alaska. It is said to have a two-metre (6.6 ft) head and a tail with a flipper. The local Inuit claim that it has snatched people off piers without their noticing its presence. It is also called Pal-Rai-Yûk. It is said to be similar to Naitaka of the Okanakanes (Ogopogo) and the Haietlik of the Nuu-chah-nulth.
