= Zaratan =

Mythological giant crab

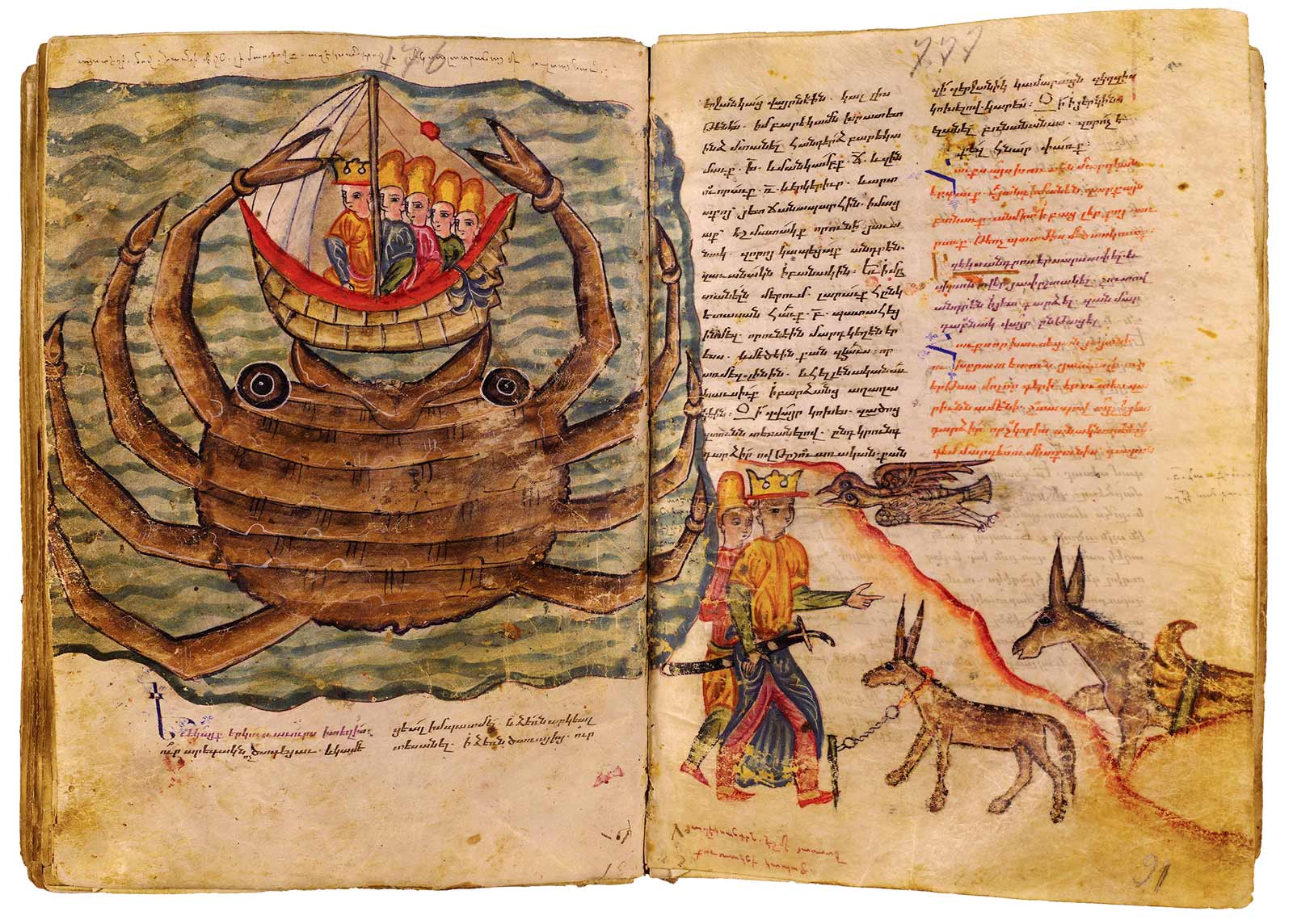
Illustration of a similar creature in the Alexander Romance, Armenian manuscript, 1538–1544.

The zaratan (from the Arabic سرطان, saraṭān, "crab"), sometimes spelled saratan, is a giant sea creature from Arabic literature and folklore.

== In Arabic literature ==
The Arabic polymath Al-Jahiz, writer of the ninth-century text Kitāb al-Hayawān (The Book of Animals), mentions three monsters that are supposed to live in the sea: the tanin (sea-dragon), the zaratan (سرطان, or saraṭān, "crab") and the bala (whale). About the zaratan, he said the following:

As to the sarathan, I have never yet met anybody who could assure me he had seen it with his own eyes. Of course, if we were to believe all that sailors tell [...] for they claim that on occasions they have landed on certain islands having woods and valleys and fissures and have lit a great fire; and when the monster felt the fire on its back, it began to glide away with them and all the plants growing on it, so that only such as managed to flee were saved. This tale outdoes the most fabulous and preposterous of stories.

This monster is also mentioned in The Wonders of Creation, written by al-Qazwini, and in the first voyage of Sinbad the Sailor in The Book of One Thousand and One Nights.

== In modern media ==
The zaratan also appears in Jorge Luis Borges's work El Libro de Los Seres Imaginarios (The Book of Imaginary Beings), where its name is spelled "zaratan," a spelling which readers of Borges have adopted in reference to this creature. Borges describes zaratans as having a long-life spans and incredible size, to the point where their shells can be mistaken easily for small islands. Borges cites Al-Jahiz and the Kitāb al-Hayawān for this information, and notes Al-Jahiz's skepticism, which he contrasts with al-Qazwini's account. Borges also appears to be responsible for the now-common representation of the zaratan as a giant turtle, rather than a crab, though it is possible that this arose from confusion between this creature and similar creatures such as the aspidochelone.

Under the name of zaratan, zaratans also appear in some editions of the tabletop roleplaying game Dungeons & Dragons.

== Similarities with other creatures ==
The zaratan is one of several sea creatures in folklore to be mistaken for islands. Others include the aspidochelone, fastitocalon, lyngbakr, and Jasconius.

== See also ==
- Aspidochelone
- Kitāb al-Hayawān
- The Wonders of Creation
- The Book of Imaginary Beings
- Vanishing island
- Leviathan
