= Wechuge =

Creature in Athabaskan mythology

Creature information
- Grouping: Legendary creature
- Sub grouping: Athabaskan

Origin
- Region: Canada; United States

The wechuge is a man-eating creature or evil spirit appearing in the legends of the Athabaskan people. In Beaver (Dane-zaa) mythology, it is said to be a person who has been possessed or overwhelmed by the power of one of the ancient giant spirit animals—related to becoming "too strong". These giant animals were crafty, intelligent, powerful and somehow retained their power despite being transformed into the normal-sized animals of the present day.

Professor Robin Ridington came across stories of the wechuge while speaking with the Dane-zaa of the Peace River region in western Canada. The Dane-zaa believed that one could become wechuge by breaking a taboo and becoming "too strong". Like the wendigo, the wechuge seeks to eat people, attempting to lure them away from their fellows by cunning. In one folktale, it is made of ice and very strong, and is only killed by being thrown on a campfire and kept there overnight until it has melted. Being a wechuge is considered a curse and a punishment, as they are destructive and cannibalistic creatures.

== Description ==
The descriptions of wechuge vary greatly. Belief in wechuge is prevalent among the Athabaskan and some other peoples of the Pacific Northwest. They are described as malevolent, cannibalistic, supernatural beings.
