= Minokawa =

Philippine mythical creature

Creature information
- Grouping: Moon coverer
- Similar entities: Bakunawa

Origin
- Region: Philippines

Minokawa is a giant, dragon-like bird in Philippine mythology. Early people believed this creature is so big that it can swallow (or cover) the Sun to explain the occurrence of eclipses. It is even described as a giant bird named Minokawa that lives in outer space which can devour the Sun and the Moon, and would try to do the same with the Earth.

In a Bagobo tale, the Minokawa is a bird as large as an island. Its feathers are those of sharp swords, the eyes reflect like mirrors, its beak and legs are like steel. It lives "outside the sky, at the eastern horizon". While the Baua lived "above the sky" because the Visayans believe that there is a cave called "calulundan" above the sky, the entrance covered by blue smoke.

== Basic Legend ==
Before time began, very long ago, a great bird called Minokawa swallowed the Moon. Seized with fear, all the people began to scream and made great noises. Then the bird peeped down to see what the matter was, and opened his mouth. But as soon as he opened his mouth, the Moon sprang out and ran away.

The Minokawa-bird is as large as the Island of Negros or Bohol. It has a beak of steel, and his claws too are of steel. His eyes are mirrors, and each single feather is a sharp sword. He lives outside the sky, at the eastern horizon, ready to seize the Moon and after the unsuccessful attempt of swallowing the satellite, it journeys and haunts again lurking under the earth.

The Moon makes eight holes in the eastern horizon to come out of, and eight holes in the western horizon to go into, because every day the big bird tries to catch her, and she is afraid. The exact moment he tries to swallow her is just when she is about to come in through one of the holes in the east to shine on us again. If the Minokawa should swallow the Moon, and the Sun too, he would then come down to Earth and gulp down men also. But when the Moon is in the belly of the big bird, and the sky is dark, then all the Bagobo people will scream and cry, and beat gongs, because they fear they will all be eaten. Soon this racket makes the Minokawa-bird look down and "open his mouth to hear the sound." Then the Moon jumps out of the bird's mouth and runs away.

== Popular culture ==
In the Bagani television series, Minokawa is one of Apo's creatures. Later, it was under Lakas' control, which it merged with his sword. He uses the bird for flight or fighting.

In TV fantasy series of GMA 7 Mulawin Vs Ravena, the Minokawa was finally killed by Anya using the Ruwido (powered up with the Mystic Jewel or Mahiwagang Hiyas), with the assistance of Almiro, Gabriel, Pagaspas, Lawiswis, Malik, Pirena and Lira. When it fell, only its bones and heart remained.
