= Elwetritsch =

Legendary creature

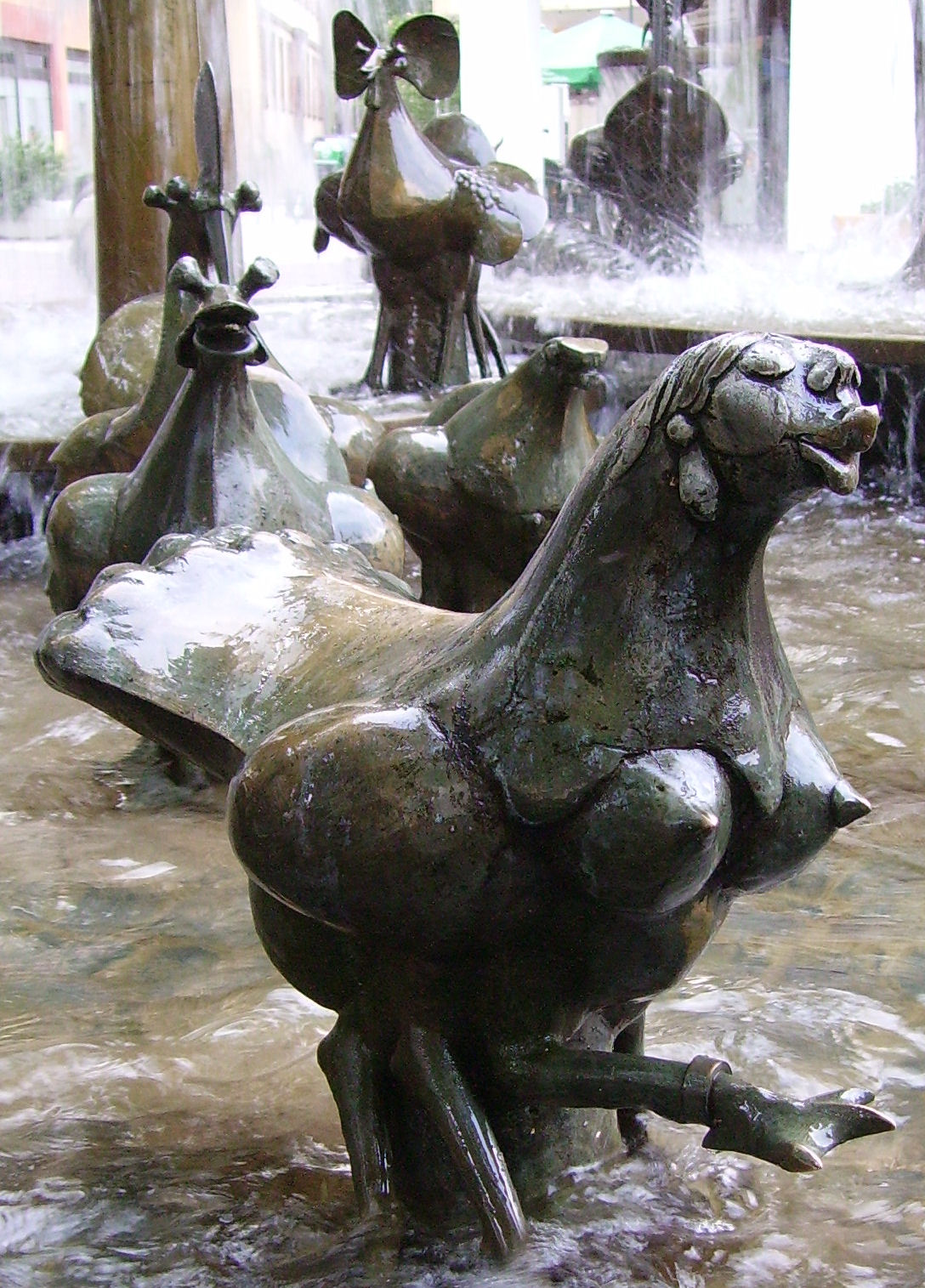
- Elwetritschefountain by Gernot Rumpf in Neustadt an der Weinstraße

Creature information
- Similar entities: the Bavarian Wolpertinger, the Thuringian Rasselbock

Origin
- Country: Germany
- Region: Palatinate
- Habitat: mainly in underbrush, under vines
- Details: human reflex to fight primal fear of having a sleep paralysis

The Elbedritsch - also Elwetrittche, Ilwedritsch; in the plural Elwedritsche(n) - is an imaginary bird-like creature that is reported in southwest Germany (especially in the Palatinate and neighboring regions). The area of distribution is essentially congruent with the historical Palatinate. With emigrants, the belief in the existence of Elbedritsche also spread to Eastern Europe and North America (Pennsylvania) in the 18th century and to South America (Brazil) in the 19th century. The Elbedritsch is to be seen as a local variation on comparable imaginary creatures from other regions (cf. Wolpertinger). The oldest written mention to date comes from Luckenbach, Texas. In 1847, sources reported that an “Elfendritschenwolpertinger” had been seen by German hunters in the woods around South Grape Creek.

== Appearance and origin ==
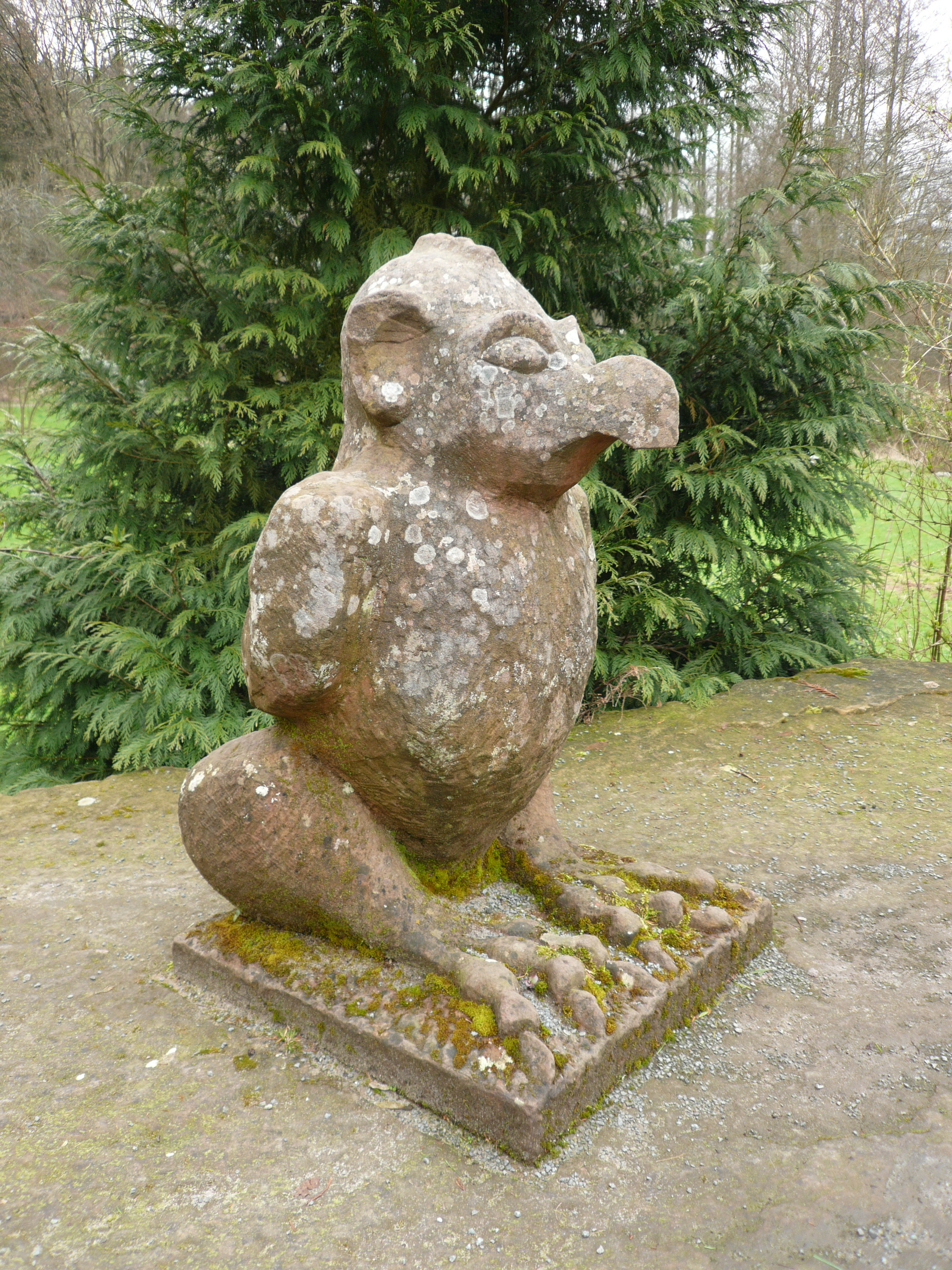
Sculpture of a male Elwetritsch

Elbedritsche are described as resembling chickens in the broadest sense. They are said to be flightless and are often depicted with a long beak. Sometimes they are depicted with deer antlers, often with six legs. What the depictions have in common is that Elbedritsche combine parts of different animals.

The belief in Elwedritsche is a cultural pattern whose roots lie in the time of the Neolithic Revolution. The process by which hunter-gatherers became farmers and pastoralists over a long period of time first took place in the Fertile Crescent of the Near East between 9500 and 7000 BCE. The sedentary way of life gave rise to new requirements: the protection of property and the safeguarding of one's own life against harmful external influences such as hunger, disease and death in a constant location. While the first aspect contributed to the emergence of patriarchy, the second aspect favored the emergence of differentiated worlds of gods. Different deities were worshipped for each of life's adversities and were granted mercy through sacrificial offerings. Evidence of this can be found in the cultures of the Babylonians, Sumerians and Assyrians. At the same time, people assumed that actions and words could have a magical effect, which led to the belief in protective and harmful spells. Traces of this can also be found in Christian and Islamic texts. Some see the Sumerian demoness Lilith, whose popular etymology means “the nocturnal one”, as being responsible for sudden infant death syndrome and nocturnal heart attacks. Others see a connection to the Sumerian mother goddess Lamashtu. The phenomenon probably had several roots.

In this context, the special protection of one's own house and sleeping quarters against harmful external influences during the night when people slept should be seen. It was believed that the deities could enter the bedrooms as shape-shifters to punish a person themselves or through messengers sent by them—be it winged through the window, as a breath of mist through door cracks or as a feather floating from the ceiling. It was believed that they would crouch on a sleeping person's bed and press against their chest; the result could be a nightmare or, in the worst case, death. People protected themselves by painting certain symbols on beds, doors and windows and reciting defensive incantations.

== Creation of the actual Elwedritsch ==
Primal fears such as the loss of control during sleep can be dealt with by first assigning the supposed demon a name and a form. Once this has been done, the demon is “shrunk”, which happens unconsciously and over a long period of time in human societies. In the case of the Elbedritsche, this happened on the one hand when people linguistically miniaturized the term “Albdrude” via intermediate forms such as “Albdrudche” and “Elbentrötsch” to “Elbedritsch” and “Elwedritsch”. An alternative path from Palatine “Albdricke” (Albdrücken) led from “Albdruck” via “Albdrickche” and “Albedrickche” or “Albedrickelche” ultimately to the same result. On the other hand, the overpowering figure itself was diminished by reducing the demon to a chicken-like bird. In the end, the creature was banished to the forest - far away from the sphere of influence of humans.

The separation of the Elwedritsch from the Albdrude must have taken place in the 17th century. By the time the 18th century emigrants arrived in Pennsylvania, the Elbedritsch had already shrunk to the size of a chicken. However, the fear of the Albdrude persisted in very rural regions (e.g. in the Pennsylvania Dutch Country in the term “Druddekopp”) right into the 20th century.

The ability of a changing shape is made clear by the fact that the creature created in this way unites body parts from various animals: the webbed feet of ducks and the wings of birds. The message here is: The demon can run, fly and swim. The aspect of infinite speed with which the Elbedritsch can move, ultimately making it invisible to humans, is often represented by the image of six legs. Even in Germanic times, Wodan's (in Norse: Odin) ability to travel infinitely fast and thus to be all-encompassing and omnipresent was visualized by the eight legs of his horse “Sleipnir”, among other things.

The custom of the Elwedritsche hunt, which has probably also been known since the 17th century, has its roots in the so-called “Trotterkopf” spell (“Druddekopp-Schpruch”). This is an old magical incantation that was intended to help banish druids (witches). It originates from the tradition of praying for health, which was called “Braucherei” in the southern regions of Germany. Words, herbs and objects (often ropes) were used to treat the sick and perform protective acts. In the Trotterkopf spell, the demon was assigned tasks that would take him a long time and take him to distant lands. In the end, he was faced with almost unsolvable tasks and thus banished, at least for a longer period of time. Unsolvable tasks are also assigned during the Elwedritsche hunt. An ignorant person, equipped with a sack and lantern, is supposed to stand in a clearing and catch Elwedritsche, which do not exist. In this way, those unfamiliar with the custom are also banished - at least for a longer period of time. The hunt represents a reversal of the power situation, as it were: Whereas before it was the Albdrude that haunted you during the night, the Elwedritsch is now hunted by humans. Through all the mechanisms described - naming, shaping, miniaturization plus hunting - the primal fear of the absolute loss of control during sleep is banished. The end result is a gain in control, which contributes to an improvement in people's lives.

== Psychological-memetic approach ==
The derivation of the origin of the Elwedritsche follows Michael Werner's psychological-memetic thesis, which has been developed between 2020 and 2025. This approach explains the mythical creature as a cultural pattern that arises from neurological phenomena such as sleep paralysis and evolves memetically.

Psychologically, the transformation of the sleep demon into the Elwetritsch can be described using the “HADD-CCT-BVT” model developed by Michael Werner as part of his psychological-memetic explanatory approach: Sleep paralysis causes hallucinations of threatening presences (e.g., nightmare demons such as Drude), which the brain demonizes through agent detection — the “Hyperactive Agency Detection Device” (HADD). The “Compensatory Control Theory” (CCT) explains why people develop defense mechanisms such as symbols and rituals to banish the demon. These fears are processed culturally, transformed into memes over generations, and diminished from dark demons to cute Palatinate mythical creatures that are banished to the forest. The “Benign Violation Theory” (BVT) makes it clear why, when the demon is miniaturized into Elwetritsch, a humorous variant prevails and humor dispels fear in this way. In the context of a fun Elwetritsche hunt, you can even hunt the resulting mythical creature, which represents a reversal of power. The demon has become prey.

Development and function: The memetic process transforms fear into humor, creates identity through hunting rituals, and strengthens communities. Michael Werner distinguishes this from pseudoscientific “tritschology” and bases it on neurological, linguistic, and cultural-historical evidence from 30 years of research among the Pennsylvania Germans—descendants of predominantly Palatinate emigrants—in the USA.

== Tritschology ==
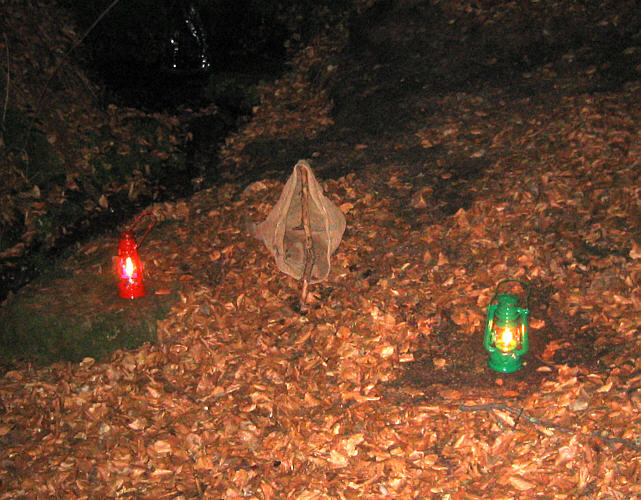
Illuminated trap for a nocturnal hunt

Over the course of the 20th century, ignorance of the cultural and historical context gave rise to a very amusing pseudo-scientific preoccupation with the topic of “Elwedritsche”, known as “Tritschology”. All kinds of supposed origin stories were invented, the imaginary species of the mysterious animal was lovingly described and ever more variants were added. Basically, this is a continuation of the process that took place with the transition from the Albdrude to the Elbedritsch. The unknown is frightening. That's why invented stories are supposed to make the inexplicable ultimately explicable - even if every tritschological approach must ultimately fail here. Tritschology is tritschology - and science is science. The phrase “tritschology is the scientific study of Elwedritsche”, which you sometimes read, is simply wrong.

The technique of hunting Elwedritsche has been continuously refined. Today, the consumption of alcohol plays a role in many cases, which in turn fits in well with the real cultural-historical background. After all, the aim is to actively process the primal fear of the night and the loss of control during sleep.

== Customs ==
In the Palatinate, you can track down the Elwedritsche. The “Elwetritsche-Brunnen” in Neustadt an der Weinstraße and the “Elwetritsche-Weg” (hiking trail) in Dahner Felsenland are particularly well-known. Supposed Elwedritsch enclosures can be seen in the zoos of Landau and Kaiserslautern. The Palatinate Museum of Natural History in Bad Dürkheim displays a taxidermied Elbedritsch in a showcase.

== Geographical distribution ==
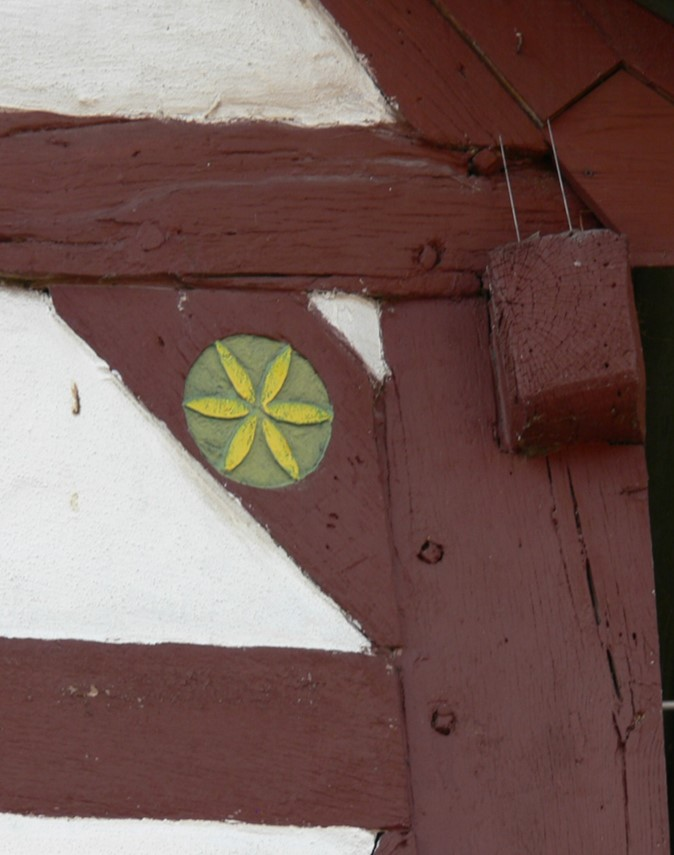
Half-timbered house in Rommersheim (Germany) with apotropaic rosette

=== Palatinate ===
The area in which tales of the Elwetritsch are spread expands from the Palatinate Forest in the west of Germany towards the east across the Upper Rhine Plain to the southern parts of the Odenwald. The mythical creature also appears in the north of Baden-Württemberg. In the Main-Tauber-Kreis, where they are known as “Ilwedridsche”, the children are told that at night the creatures sleep in the crowns of the willow trees standing next to the river Tauber. In Neustadt an der Weinstraße, which is said to be the “capital” of the Elwetritsches, there is an Elwetritsche-fountain, created by Gernot Rumpf. Other sources consider Dahn in the southwestern Palatinate, which also has an Elwetritsche-fountain, Erfweiler or other villages as secret capitals of these creatures.

=== Pennsylvania ===
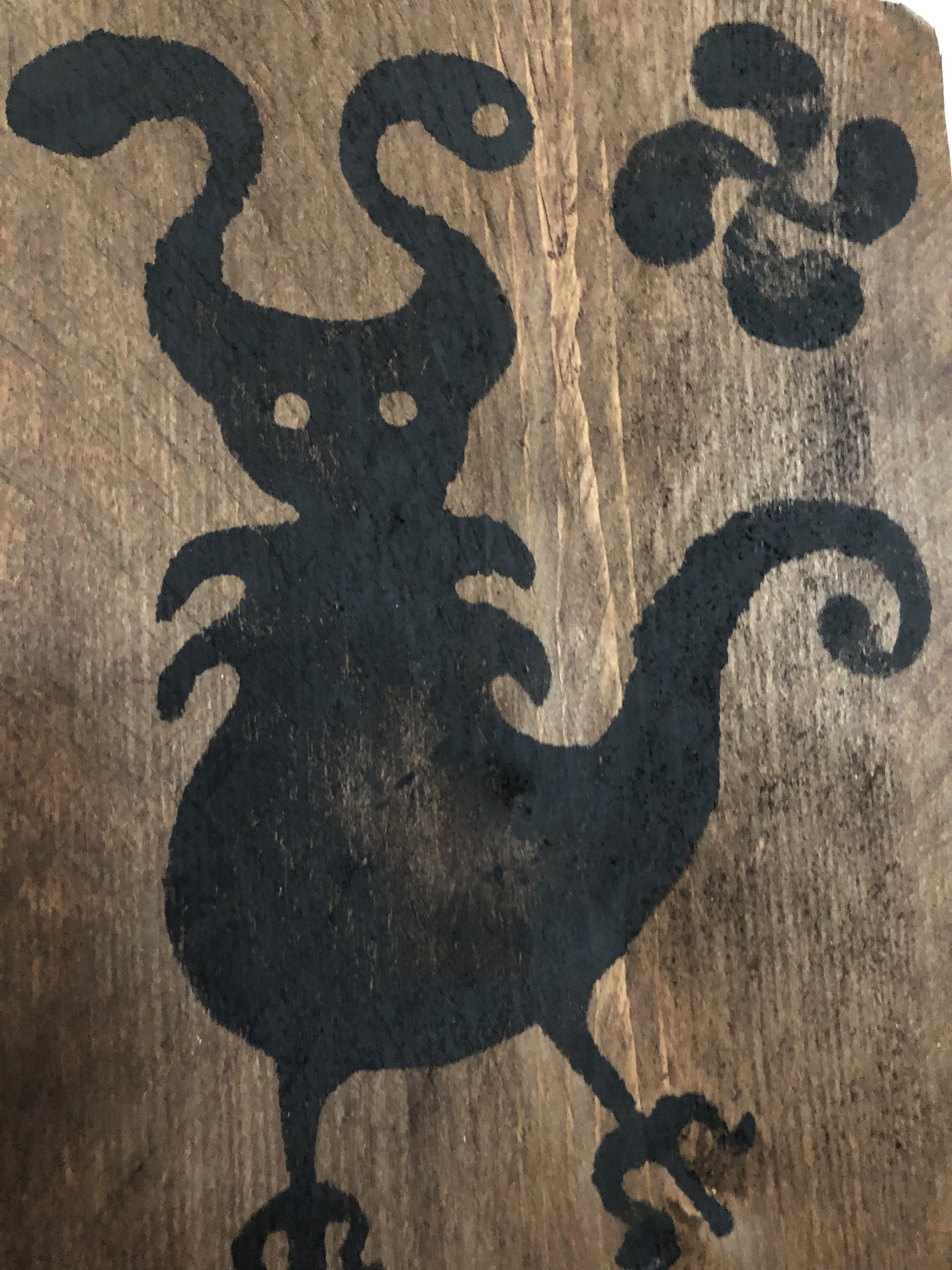
A Pennsylvania Dutch Elbedritsch

In Pennsylvania among the Pennsylvania Dutch, the Elwetritsch is known as the Elbedritsch. The lore concerning the Elbedritsch is similar to that of the Elwetritsch in that the victim of the trick was set out with a bag to catch one and left abandoned. The Pennsylvania Dutch are convinced that Palatinate people—their biggest group of ancestors—had taken some “Elbedritschelcher” (diminutive of Elbedritsch) with them “so dass sie kenn Heemweh grigge deede” (so that they wouldn't become homesick). Tales of the Elbedritsche are also documented in Amish communities. The newsletter of the Pennsylvania German Society is Es Elbedritsch.

== Classification ==
Elwedritsche were - at least originally - not mythical animals or fantastic creatures. They have only developed into the latter since the publication of the Harry Potter books (see J.K. Rowling: “Fantastic Beasts & Where to Find Them, 2001). This fact is an argument for the fact that this cultural pattern is still subject to constant change today. Originally, however, Elwedritsche were “personifications of primal fears tamed by man” that were banished to the forest.

Instead of a cultural pattern, science also speaks of a meme. This is a pattern of information (e.g. a thought, a song, a fairy tale, a custom) that is stored in the brain and can be recalled. The meme can be passed on through communication - across generations and great distances. Memes are subject to socio-cultural evolution. “Mutations” occur during the passing on process. Memes divide, then change in different ways in different places and in this way form a network of patterns over time, in which the relationship is sometimes difficult to recognize. Thus, Elwedritsche can be something different in the Alpine region of the 16th and 17th centuries than in Pennsylvania in the 18th and 19th centuries - and in the Palatinate of the 20th and 21st centuries. And yet they are connected by a common core. If you want to penetrate to this core, you have to move “backwards” in time and space and thus follow the Indo-European migration to its origin in the Fertile Crescent. This is where what we know today as Elwedritsch originated. The underlying primal meme of the phenomenon is: “How do I conquer the primal fear of losing control during sleep?” Everything that has developed is ultimately an answer to this question.

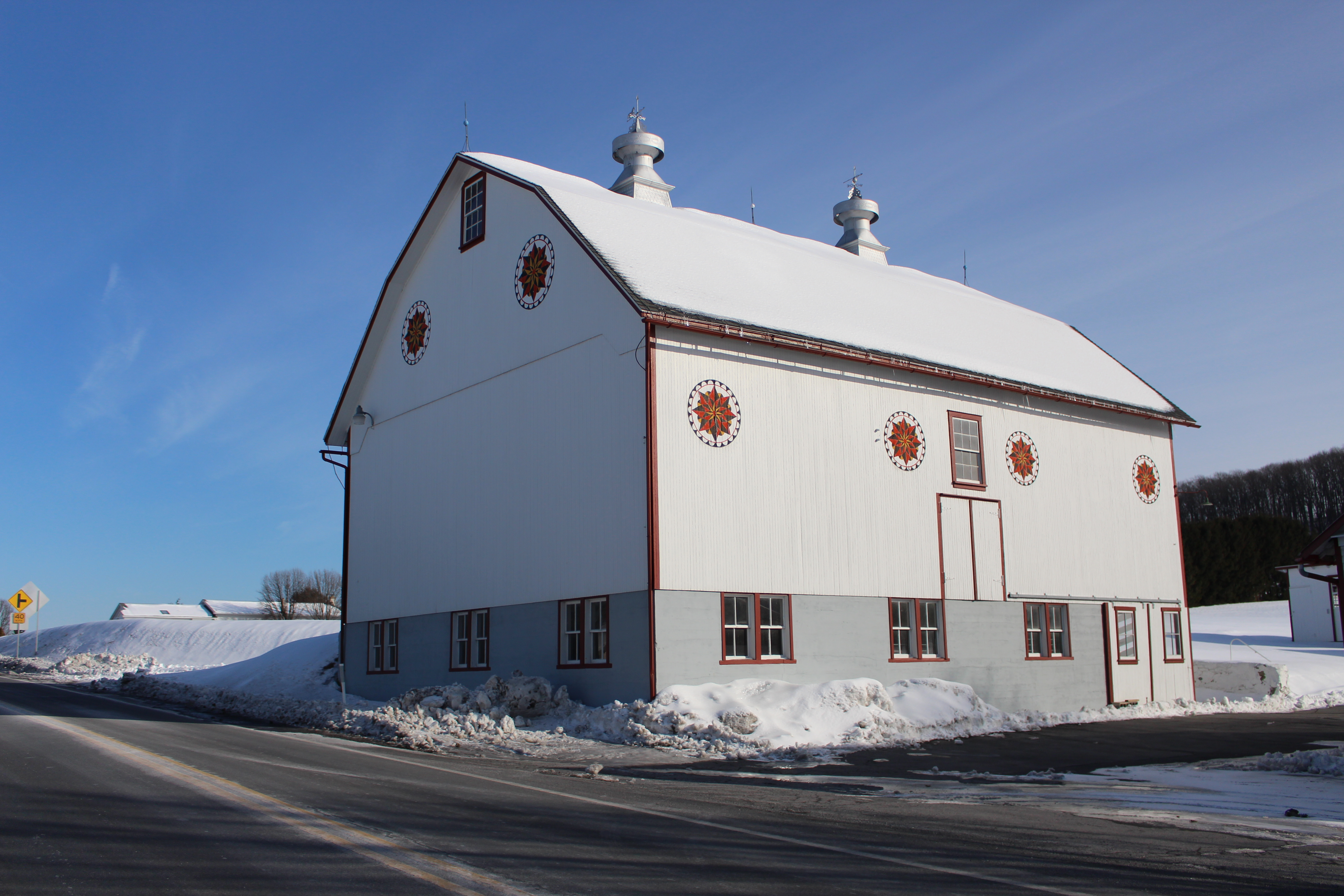
A Pennsylvania Dutch barn with apotropaic symbols ("hex signs") at Werley's Corner (Lehigh County)

== Elwetritsch monuments ==
There are several monuments in the Palatinate:

- Dahn:
  - Elwetritsche fountain
  - Elwetritsche educational trail
  - Elwetritsche hiking trail
  - Elwetritsche monument in municipal park
  - Local carnival club uses Elwetritsche as mascot
- Neustadt an der Weinstraße:
  - Elwetritsche fountain (illustrated)
- Wernigerode:
  - Elwetritsche fountain
- Winnweiler:
  - Local brewery Bischoff used Elwetritsche as mascot

== Literature ==
- Behnke, Thomas: Michael Werner über sein neues Hiwwe-wie-Driwwe-Buch „Elwedritsche - Dunkle Gefährten“: Schlafdämonen sind des Pudels Kern. In: LEO Freizeitmagazin, January 16, 2025.
- Behnke, Thomas: Ein Gespenst, das den Albdruck erzeugt: Michael Werner schreibt über Elwedritsche. In: rheinpfalz.de, January 17, 2025.
- Benss, Timo: Was Elwetritsche mit Albträumen zu tun haben. In: Rheinpfalz am Sonntag, December 14, 2024.
- Donmoyer, Patrick J.: Hex Signs - Myth and Meaning of the Pennsylvania Dutch Barn Stars. Kutztown (PA) 2013.
- Donmoyer, Patrick J.: Powwowing in Pennsylvania. Braucherei & the Ritual of Everyday Life. Kutztown (PA) 2018.
- Werner, Michael: Elbedritsche - Die Auflösung des ewigen Rätsels. In: Hiwwe wie Driwwe - Der Pennsylvania ReiseVERführer. AGIRO Verlag (Neustadt an der Weinstraße) 2021: 148-153. ISBN 978-3-946587-34-7
- Werner, Michael: Geheimnisvolle Pfalz - Zwischen den Welten. In: VielPfalz 6/2023: 16-33.
- Werner, Michael: Elwedritsche – What they really are. In: hiwwe-wie-driwwe.com. Published on November 25, 2024.
- Werner, Michael: Elwedritsche - Dunkle Gefährten. AGIRO Verlag (Neustadt an der Weinstraße) 2025. ISBN 978-3946587781.
- Yoder, Don & Graves, Thomas E.: Hex Signs - Pennsylvania Dutch Barn Symbols & Their Meaning. Stackpole Books 2000 (2nd edition).

== See also ==
- Skvader
- Jackalope
- Jenny Haniver
- Dahu
- Wolpertinger
- Snipe hunt
