= Cabbit =

Fictional cat–rabbit hybrid creature

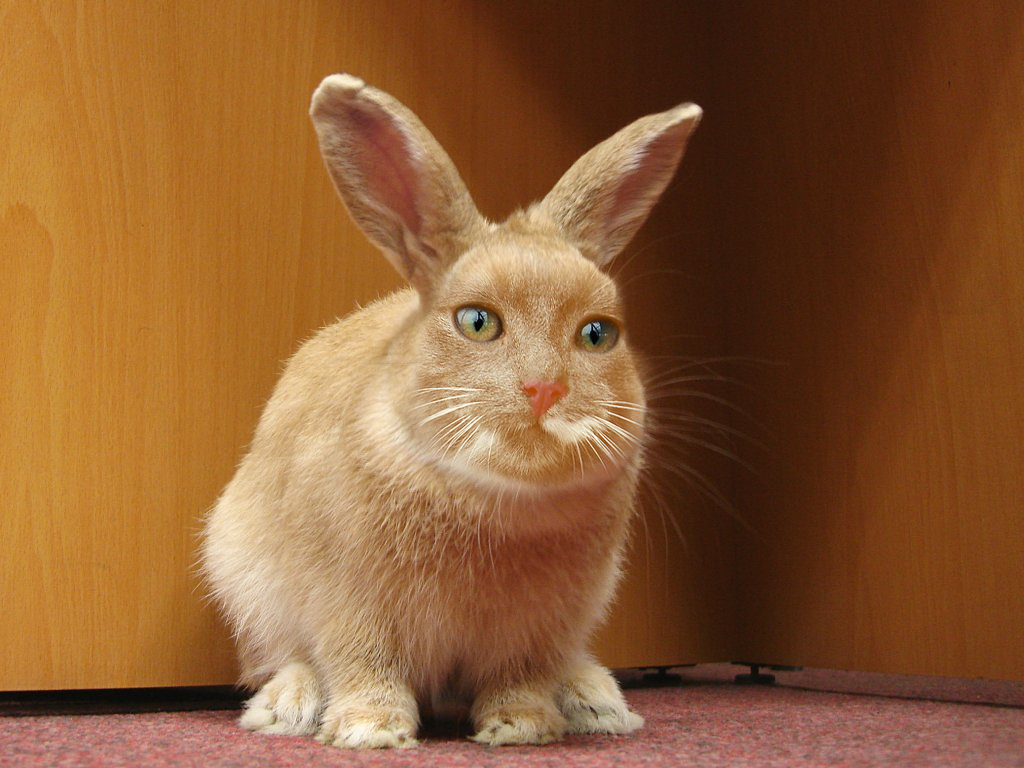
An artist's impression of a cabbit.

A cabbit is a fictional hybrid between a cat and a rabbit. They have appeared in fiction and fantasy stories and have also been dubiously claimed to have been observed in the wild. Most if not all observations are attributable to either misidentified Manx cats or outright hoaxes.

A cat–rabbit hybrid creature was first incorrectly documented in 1845 by Joseph Train of Castle Douglas, Galloway, Scotland, in his An Historical and Statistical Account of the Isle of Man, where he opined that the local Manx cat, a breed typified by a short, tufty tail and long, powerful hind legs like a rabbit, was such a hybrid: "My observations on the structure and habits of the specimen in my possession, leave little doubt on my mind of its being a .... cross between the female cat and the buck rabbit." Scientific study has determined that such a hybrid is genetically impossible.

The portmanteau term cabbit is used for such imagined hybrids. The exact year of coinage is uncertain. The term was used in 1977 to describe a specimen found in New Mexico and exhibited in Los Angeles. The specimen was showcased on The Tonight Show and was later determined to be a cat with a deformed pelvis.

== Cat mutations ==
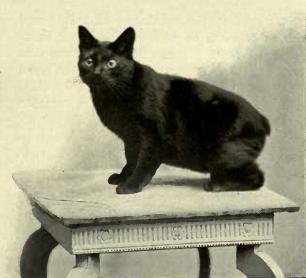
The Manx cat has been responsible for alleged cabbit sightings due to its lack of prominent tail and long hind legs.

Manx cats and other cats with tailless or bobtailed mutations account for many alleged cabbit sightings. The mutation that causes taillessness can also cause skeletal and/or nerve abnormalities that result in the cat's using a hopping motion. This was once accepted by breeders as a feature of the Manx's look, but is now considered a serious fault in the show-ring and does not form part of the modern Manx standard of points. Modern breeders of the Manx are careful to breed only from cats that have normal locomotion. The relatively long hind legs of the Manx, combined with taillessness or a very short tail, give the impression of a rabbit.

In 1947, Grace Cox-Ife wrote: "There are several points about a Manx that make it anything but ordinary. The chief one is, of course, its taillessness; but this is not quite the whole story. Not only must a Manx have no tail but it should really be a further joint or more short on the spinal column; that is to say there should be a hollow where the tail would normally begin. Then there is the gait – a rabbity hop rather than a walk- which is caused by the height of the hindquarters: according to the Manx Cat Club these "cannot be too high, and the back cannot be too short, while there must be great depth of flank. The head should be round and large, but not of the snubby or Persian type.

Rose Tenent wrote: "No cat is more fascinating than the tailless Manx, with its rabbit-like hoppity gait .... The hind legs are considerably longer than the front ones, thus giving the cat its peculiar hopping gait; incidentally, also the reason for the reasonable theory held in some quarters that the Manx cat is the result of a cross-mating between a cat and a rabbit."

== See also ==
- Jackalope
- Skvader
- Wolpertinger
