= Prock =

Prock may refer to:

== People ==
- Christian Leberecht von Prøck, Governor-General of the Dutch West Indies from 1756 to 1766
- Austin Prock, 2024 and 2025 NHRA Nitro Funny Car champion
- Hannah Prock (born 2000), Austrian luger, daughter of Markus Prock
- John Prock (1929–2012), American college football coach
- Markus Prock (born 1964), Austrian luger

== Other uses ==
- "Prock" Awesome, the main character in Hulu's animated comedy series The Awesomes
- Prock, another name for the folkloric sidehill gouger
