= Lepus cornutus =

Mythical horned hare

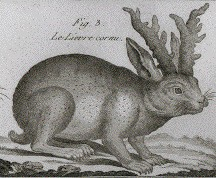
Lepus cornutus (labeled in French "Lièvre cornu"), as depicted in the 1789 Tableau Encyclopedique et Methodique by Pierre Joseph Bonnaterre

In folklore, the lepus cornutus or horned hare is a type of hare or rabbit that in the 16th, 17th and 18th centuries was believed to exist, but is now considered to be fictional.

== Scientific descriptions ==
Horned hares were described in medieval and early Renaissance texts, both as real creatures and as farcical or mythological ones, such as by Rabelais in his Gargantua and Pantagruel. The first mention of the lepus cornutus as described as a real animal comes from Conrad Gessner in his Historiae animalium, mentioning that they live in Saxony.

Many other scientific works on animals repeated this or similar claims, often with the same depictions. These include John Jonston's Historiae naturalis de quadrupetibus libri from 1655, whose illustrations were reused in multiple books, including the 1718 Theatrum universale omnium animalium, piscium, avium, quadrupedum, exanguium, aquaticorum, insectorum et angium by Ruysch.

Gaspar Schott wrote about the horned hare in his 1662 work Physica curiosa, displaying it on the frontispice and with a further illustration. Gabriel Clauder published in 1687 an article on a horned hare he had sighted, with an illustration. In 1743, Jacob Theodor Klein in his Summa dubiorum produced another illustration of the same.

Pierre Joseph Bonnaterre's 1789 Tableau Encyclopedique et Methodique was apparently the last major scientific work to include the lepus cornutus as a real animal. By the late 18th and early 19th century, the idea of a horned hare as a real species was mostly rejected, although the 1817 Nouveau dictionnaire d'histoire naturelle considers it a possibly real but very rare animal.

It has been speculated that the story of the horned hare may not only be caused by fertile imagination or fabrications by taxidermists, but may be caused by sightings of hares with the Shope papilloma virus.

== Depictions in art ==
- Jan Brueghel the Elder, Virgin and Child Surrounded by Flowers and Fruit, now in the Prado museum; the horned hare can be seen at the bottom right
- Antonio Tempesta made a drawing of two horned hares for the Nuova raccolta de li animali piu' curiosi nel mondo, now in the Italian Istituzione Nazionale per la Grafica

== Gallery ==
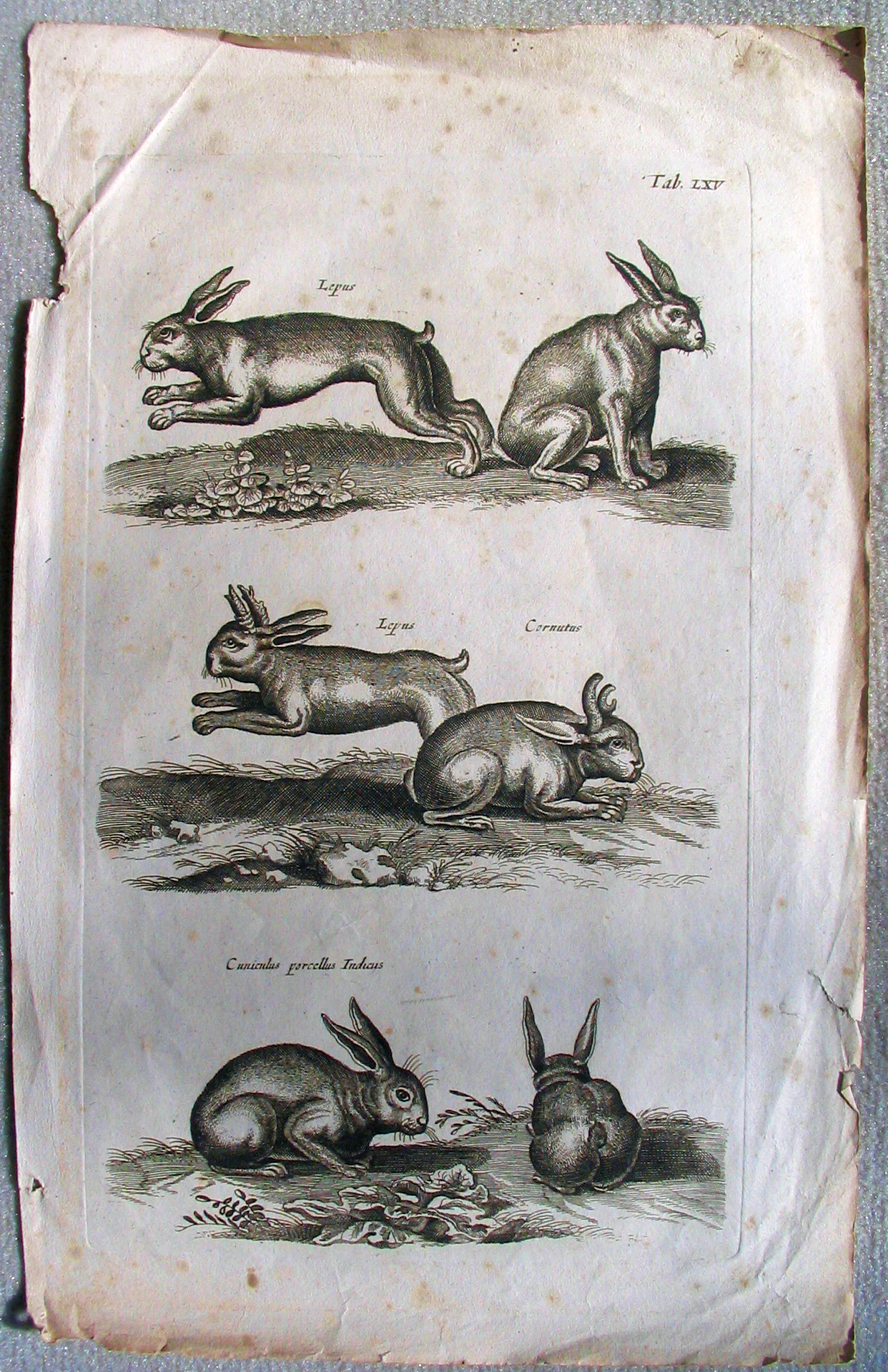
John Jonston, lepus cornutus (middle image), from the Historiae naturalis de quadrupetibus libri, 1655.

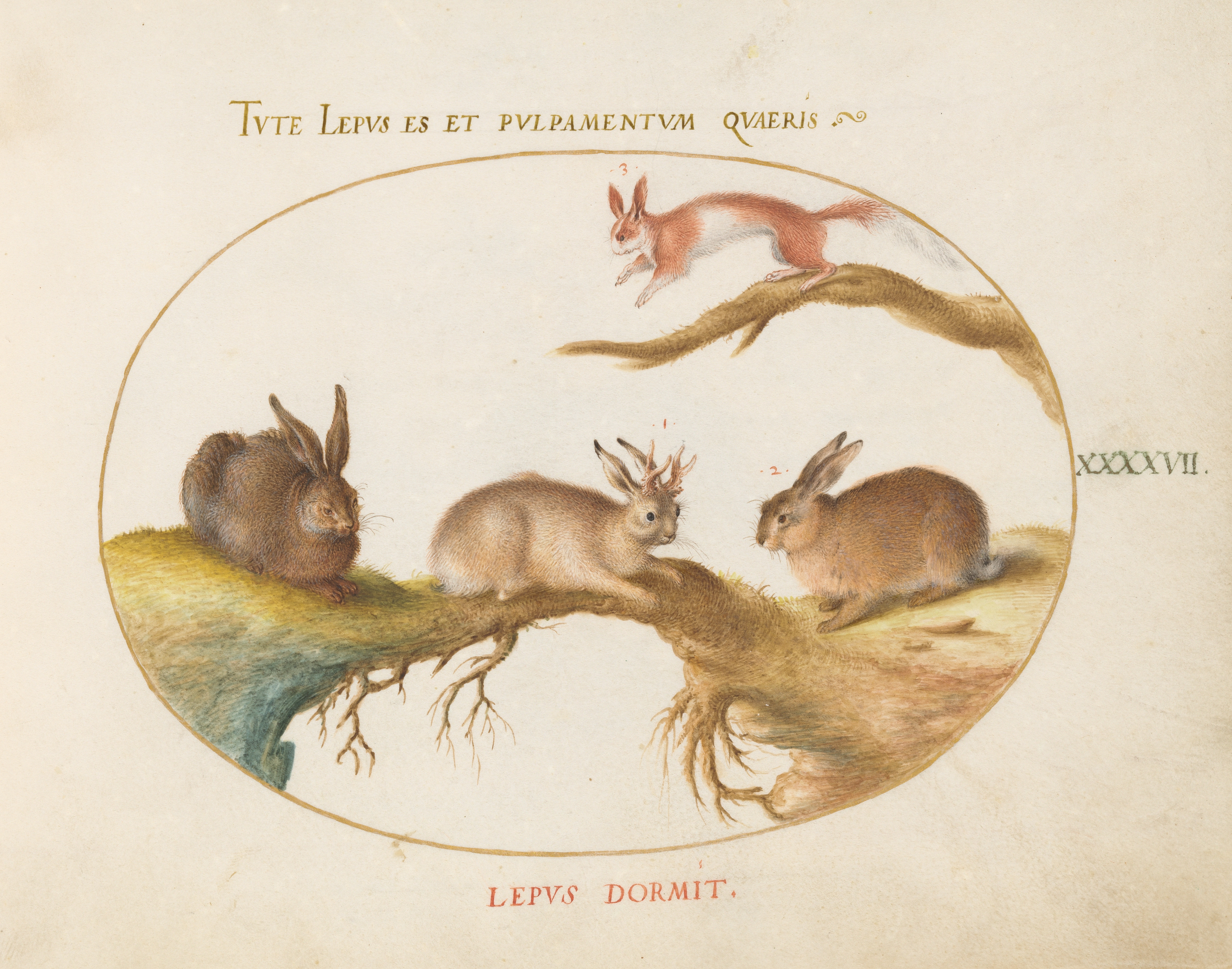
Joris Hoefnagel, Plate XLVII of the Animalia Qvadrvpedia et Reptilia (Terra) from ca. 1575

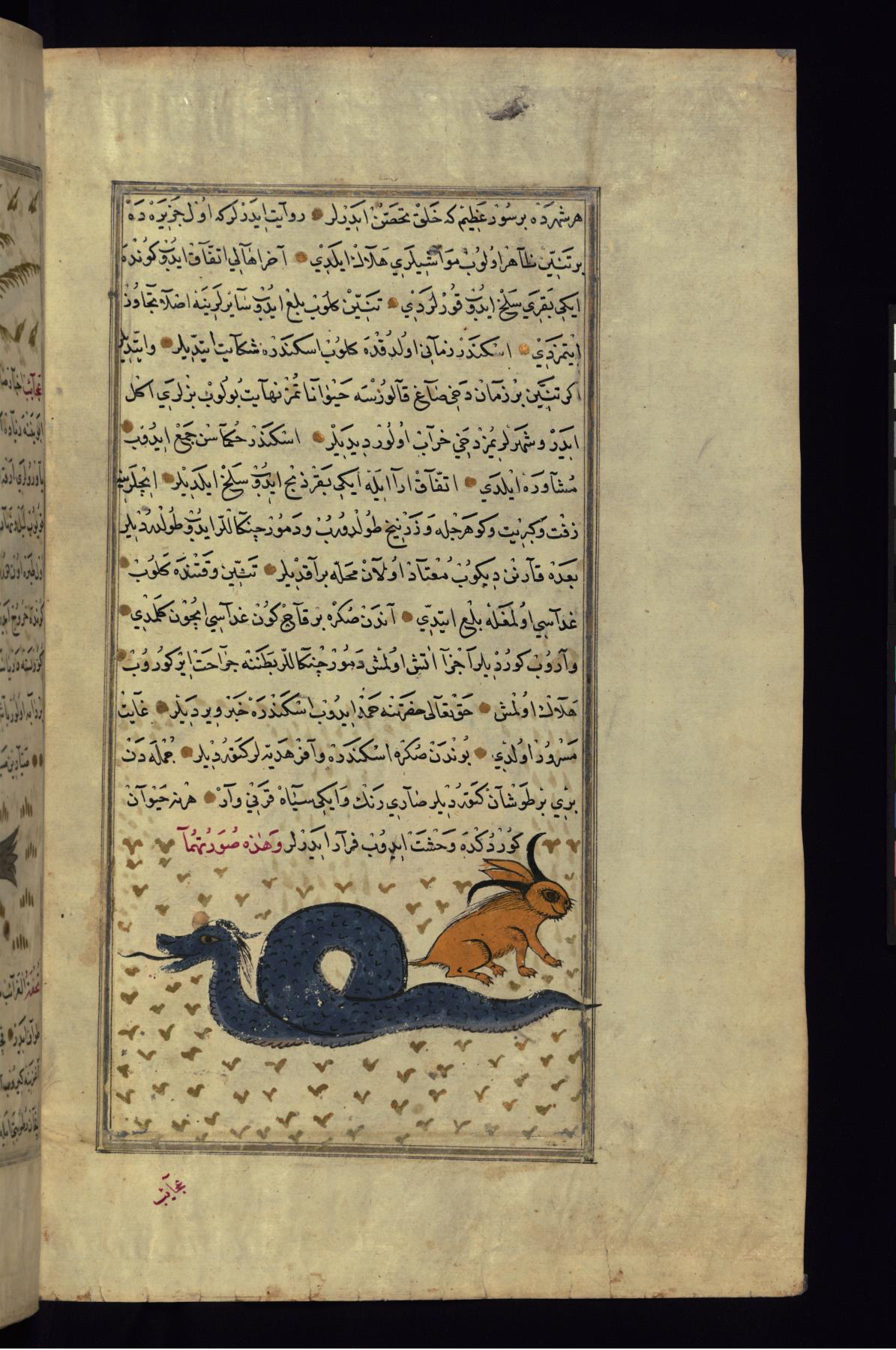
The horned rabbit given by the inhabitants of Tannin Island to Alexander the Great, after he had slain the dragon living there: illustration from Walters manuscript W.659; 18th-century copy of a 13th-century text by Zakariya al-Qazwini

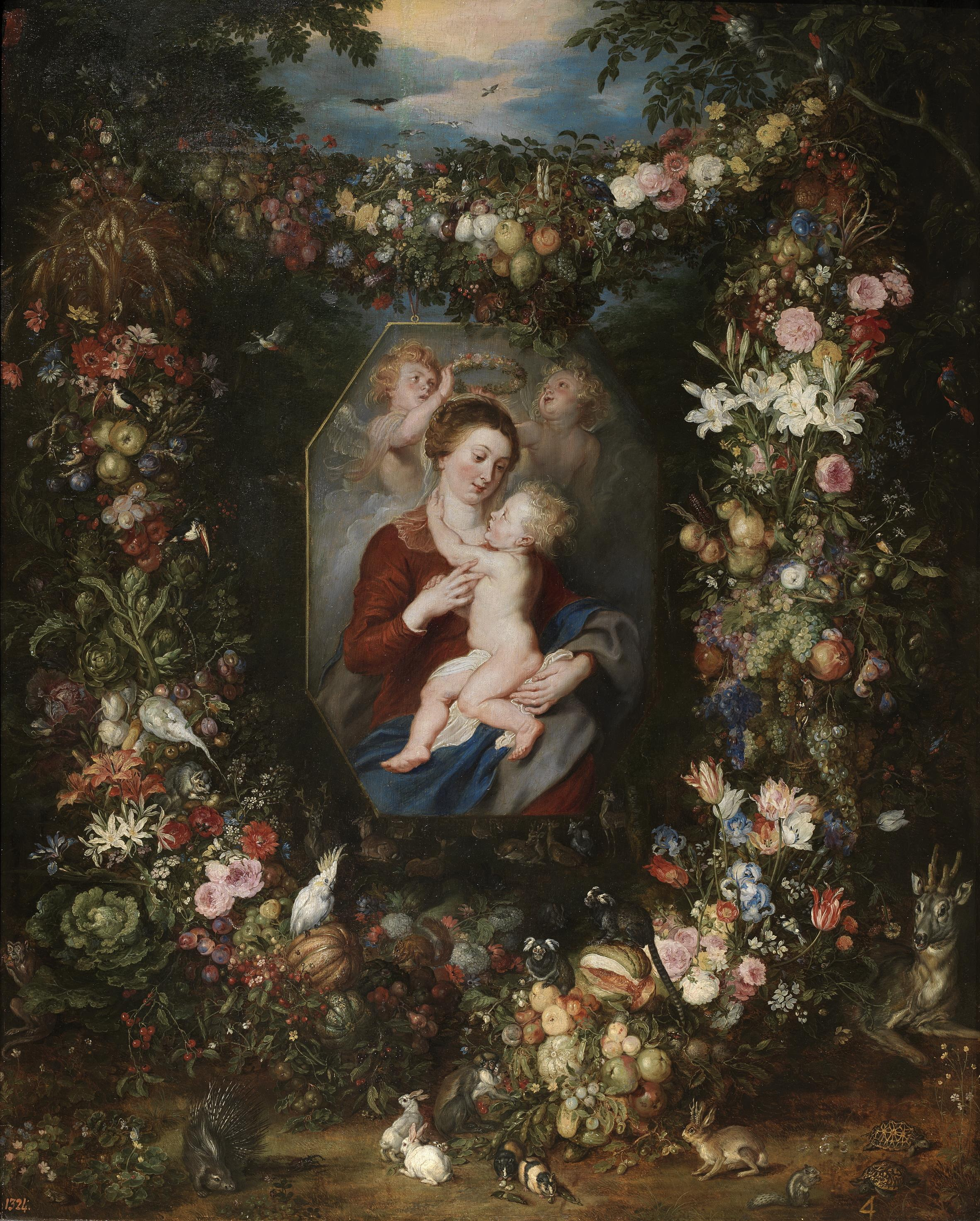
Jan Brueghel the Elder, Virgin and Child Surrounded by Flowers and Fruit, now in the Prado museum; the horned hare can be seen at the bottom right

== Reported actual animals ==
Horned hares were reported in the collection of Emperor Rudolf II.

In the biography of French scientist Nicolas-Claude Fabri de Peiresc, it is related that in 1606 he visited a widow in Leuven who had two living horned hares, said to be from Norway, but that one of them had died before his arrival.

British naturalist John Ray, in his 1673 Travels Through the Low-Countries, Germany, Italy and France, reports that he had seen in Delft, in the museum of apothecary Jean Vander Mere, the "head of a horned hare" (next to things like a tooth of a hippopotamus, although Ray questions the existence of said animal).

Count Ludwig August Mellin was said to own the antlers of a horned hare, which were reported on and depicted by German naturalist Johann Christian Daniel von Schreber in 1792 in his Die Säugthiere in Abbildungen nach der Natur mit Beschreibungen (Mammals in Illustrations from Nature with Descriptions).

== Related animals ==
Unlike the lepus cornutus, the following were never believed to be real animals by scientists, and have not been included in lists of binomial nomenclature.

The wolpertinger is an animal in German folklore, usually described as a horned rabbit or horned squirrel with wings and other unusual attributes. The jackalope is a mythical hare from North America, described as a hare with antlers. It was invented in the 1930s. The Al-mi'raj is a single-horned hare which appears in medieval Arab literature. Unlike most horned hares, it was described as carnivorous.

At least one genus of real 'horned' small mammal existed, the extinct horned gopher Ceratogaulus. However, this was a rodent (not a hare) and the paired conical bone protrusions on its skull were atop its snout forward of its eyes (not on its forehead nor towards the back of its head as illustrations portray for a lepus cornutus or jackalope).

== See also ==
Skvader
