= Tamarou =

Tamarou can refer to:

- Tamaraw, a small hoofed mammal
- Dahu, an imaginary animal
