= Snipe hunt =

United States practical joke

A snipe hunt is a type of practical joke or fool's errand, in existence in North America as early as the 1840s, in which an unsuspecting newcomer is duped into trying to catch an elusive animal called a snipe. Although the snipe is a real bird, a snipe hunt is a quest for a nonexistent creature whose description varies.

The target of the prank is led to an outdoor spot and given instructions for catching the snipe; these often include waiting in the dark and holding an empty bag or making noises to attract the creature. The others involved in the prank then leave the newcomer alone in the woods to discover the joke. As an American rite of passage, snipe hunting is often associated with summer camps and similar outdoor activities. In France, a similar joke is called "hunting the dahut".

== Description ==
Although snipe are actual birds (three genera within the sandpiper family), the snipe hunt is a practical joke, often associated with summer camps and other types of outdoor activities including camping and hunting, in which the victim is tricked into searching for an imaginary creature.

Snipe hunters are typically led to an outdoor spot at night and given a bag or pillowcase along with instructions that can include either waiting quietly or making odd noises to attract the creatures. The other group members leave, promising to chase the snipe toward the newcomer; instead, they return home or to camp, leaving the victim of the prank alone in the dark to discover that they have been duped and left "holding the bag".

The snipe hunt is a kind of fool's errand (Note: The snipe hunt is classified as a variation of Thompson motif J2349, Fool's Errand.) or wild-goose chase, meaning a fruitless errand or expedition, attested as early as the 1840s in the United States. (Note: According to historian Christopher R. Fee: "Similar fool's errands or wild-goose chases of this kind might include being sent to find a 'smoke-bender' for the campfire or a 'sky-hook' to move a heavy object".) It was the most common hazing ritual for boys in American summer camps during the early 20th century, and is a rite of passage often associated with groups such as the Boy Scouts. In camp life and children's folklore, the snipe hunt provides an opportunity to make fun of newcomers while also accepting them into the group.

Setting the stage for the prank is often done with imaginative descriptions of the snipe, similar to tall tales. For instance, the snipe is said to resemble a cross between a jackrabbit and a squirrel; a squirrel-like bird with one red and one green eye; a small, black, furry bird-like animal that only comes out during a full moon, and so on. According to American Folklore: An Encyclopedia:

While the snipe hunt is known in virtually every part of the United States, the description of the prey varies: it may be described as a type of bird, a snake, or a small furry animal. In one version, the snipe is a type of deer with a distinctive call; the dupe is left kneeling and imitating the snipe call while holding the bag to catch it.

In another variation, a bag supposedly containing a captured snipe is theatrically brought to the campsite after a group hunt; the snipe quickly "escapes" unseen when the bag is opened.

== Variations ==
The Pennsylvania German version of the legendary snipe is the Elbedritsche. The young subject of a prank is taken to an isolated area and given instructions on calling the Elbedritsche along with a sack to catch it in, while the pranksters leave the young person "holding the bag". In France, the legendary dahu or dahut is the ostensible prey in a similar type of practical joke. While the description of the prey differs from the North American snipe hunt, the nature of the joke is the same.

In Spain and Portugal, a similar joke is called cazar gamusinos ('hunting gamusinos'). The gamusino is an imaginary animal with no defined description. In Cuba, the word came to mean "minute fish" giving name to the genus Gambusia.

== See also ==
- Drop bear
- Fearsome critters
- Jackalope
- List of practical joke topics
- Oozlum bird
- Squonk
- Wild haggis
