= Snipe Hunt (Atlanta) =

- Atlanta episode
- Episode no.: Season 4 Episode 7
- Directed by: Hiro Murai
- Written by: Francesca Sloane
- Cinematography by: Christian Sprenger
- Editing by: Isaac Hagy
- Production code: XAA04007
- Original air date: October 20, 2022
- Running time: 31 minutes

Episode chronology
← Previous "Crank Dat Killer"	Next → "The Goof Who Sat By the Door"
- Atlanta season 4

"Snipe Hunt" is the seventh episode of the fourth season of the American comedy-drama television series Atlanta. It is the 38th overall episode of the series and was written by supervising producer Francesca Sloane, and directed by executive producer Hiro Murai. It was first broadcast on FX in the United States on October 20, 2022.

The series is set in Atlanta and follows Earnest "Earn" Marks, as he tries to redeem himself in the eyes of his ex-girlfriend Van, who is also the mother of his daughter Lottie; as well as his parents and his cousin Alfred, who raps under the stage name "Paper Boi"; and Darius, Alfred's eccentric right-hand man. After staying in Europe for a tour during the previous season, the season sees the characters back in Atlanta. The episode, which is presented in a 4:3 aspect ratio, focuses on Earn taking Van and Lottie to a campground to celebrate Lottie's 6th birthday, hoping to convince Van to move to Los Angeles with him.

According to Nielsen Media Research, the episode was seen by an estimated 0.114 million household viewers and gained a 0.05 ratings share among adults aged 18–49. The episode received extremely positive reviews from critics, who praised Glover's and Beetz's performances, writing, character development and pacing.

== Plot ==
Earn (Donald Glover) takes Van (Zazie Beetz) and Lottie (Austin Elle Fisher) on a camping trip, with Earn reserving an entire campground to celebrate Lottie's 6th birthday. As they spend the day together, Earn constantly asks Van if she intends to move to Los Angeles with him, now that he has found a job there.

Van intends for Lottie to snipe hunt, a tradition she picked up while she was in the Girl Scouts, claiming that only a smart person can catch the imaginary creature. Earn is skeptical about the idea, but he eventually comes to accept it. Throughout the day, Earn shows a lack of knowledge about camping and navigating the outdoors. When they all go fishing, Lottie reveals she'd prefer to spend her birthday with her grandparents. That night, Earn and Van talk about Los Angeles, with Van accusing Earn of this trip as a way to manipulate her into being more receptive to his idea, and that staying in Atlanta would at least feel like her own choice. Their conversation is interrupted when Lottie catches the "snipe", an unknown creature that frightens Earn and Van.

Earn, who is sleeping in a separate room in their oversized tent, is invited to sleep in Van and Lottie’s sleeping bag due to the freezing weather. With Lottie asleep, Earn and Van discuss Los Angeles once again, with Earn saying he could move alone, meet someone new, and only see Van and Lottie every couple of months, but he would feel incomplete. He claims that he wants them to be a family. Van states that if he just wants to stay with her because she is his daughter's mother, that wouldn't be enough for her. Earn admits that he loves Van for who she truly is, having been unable to stop thinking about her since their encounter in Amsterdam, (Note: As seen in "White Fashion".) which surprises her. They huddle together in the sleeping bag and Van tells him that she loves him too.

The next day, Earn, Van and Lottie leave the campground as it starts raining, abandoning the inconveniently large tent. As her parents talk happily in the front seat, having obviously made up, Lottie smiles knowingly in the back.

== Production ==
=== Development ===
"Libra men are the WORST. How you a air sign and ain't got a passport? Ain't nobody trynna go on vacation in the woods with bugs."

— Official description in the press release for the episode.

In September 2022, FX announced that the seventh episode of the season would be titled "Snipe Hunt" and that it would be written by supervising producer Francesca Sloane and directed by executive producer Hiro Murai. This was Sloane's second writing credit, and Murai's 24th directing credit.

The episode has a different aspect ratio than the rest of the show, as the episode was shot digitally and then printed to film.

== Reception ==
=== Viewers ===
The episode was watched by 0.114 million viewers, earning a 0.05 in the 18-49 rating demographics on the Nielson ratings scale. This means that 0.05 percent of all households with televisions watched the episode. This was a 55% decrease from the previous episode, which was watched by 0.253 million viewers with a 0.08 in the 18-49 demographics.

=== Critical reviews ===
"Snipe Hunt" received extremely positive reviews. The review aggregator website Rotten Tomatoes reported a 100% approval rating, based on six reviews, with an average rating of 7.7/10.

Quinci LeGardye of The A.V. Club gave the episode an "A-" and writing, "Compared to the last three episodes of Atlanta, a truly stellar run of laugh-out-loud examples of the show's chameleonic modes, 'Snipe Hunt' is very chill. There's no city landmarks or intricate surrealist set pieces; the conflict is interior instead of introducing some random antagonist like Nando or Zan. We don't meet any new characters other than the brief appearance by the campground owner, which may be a record for this show. Instead, director Hiro Murai and writer Francesca Sloane produce a quiet family drama in the middle of a vast campground, focusing on characters and giving us more time with Earn, Van, and Lottie as a family unit."

Alan Sepinwall of Rolling Stone wrote, "After a run of very big and funny Atlanta episodes, 'Snipe Hunt' opts for a quieter, more wistful tone. Earn screws up with the tent, but he ultimately accomplishes his main goal for the camping trip. He convinces Van to join him in Los Angeles, not as a co-parent and friend, but as the life partner he has finally figured out that he wants her to be."

Ile-Ife Okantah of Vulture gave the episode a 3 star rating out of 5 and wrote, "'Snipe Hunt' is also a much more heartfelt episode than I would have expected. Atlanta is known for its experimental nature and Afro-surrealist energy, so episodes like this sometimes fall flat for a viewer like me who is eager to dissect every twist and turn. But the episode seems to anticipate this reaction by producing an unsettling energy that keeps the viewers anxious about what's next." Christian Hubbard of Full Circle Cinema gave the episode a perfect 10 out of 10 rating and wrote, "'Snipe Hunt', like the ones preceding it, doesn’t really carry a noticeable narrative thread with the rest of the final season. However, like the entire catalog of installments before it, it tells a story that feels tangible and easy to follow. The stakes are personal and that's okay because every story told on television should be."
