= Wild haggis =

Fictional animal

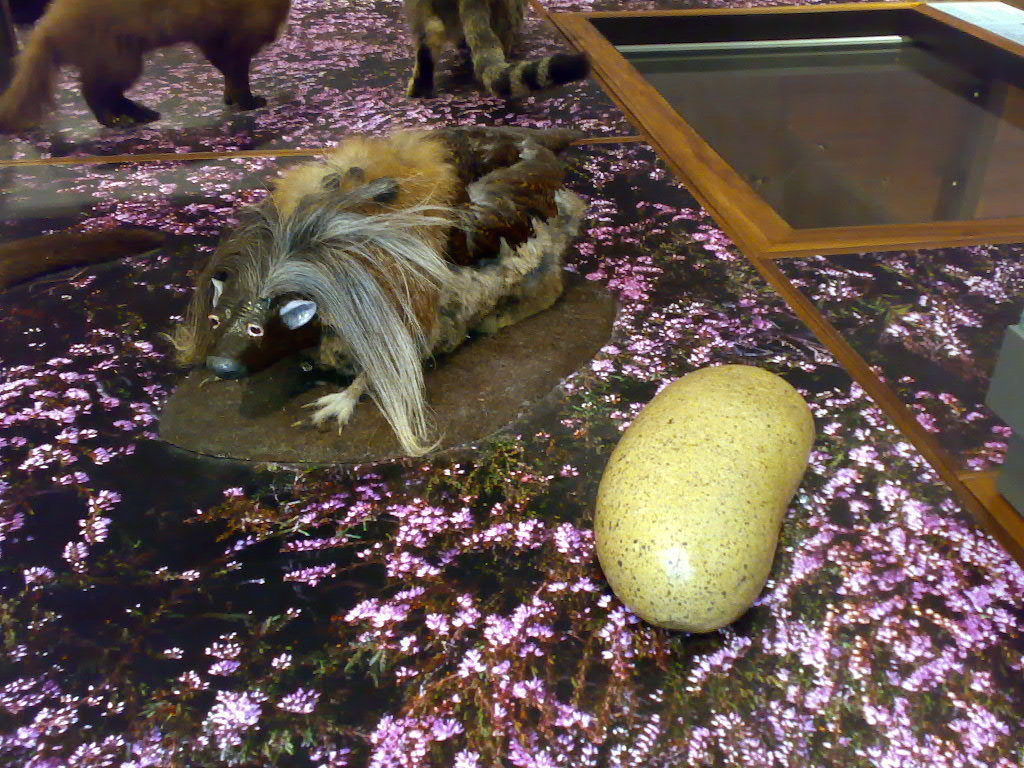
A fictional wild haggis specimen, Haggis scoticus, as displayed in the Glasgow Kelvingrove Gallery, next to a prepared example.

Wild haggis (given the humorous taxonomic designation Haggis scoticus) is a fictional creature of Scottish folklore, said to be native to the Scottish Highlands. It is comically claimed to be the source of haggis, a traditional Scottish dish that is in fact made from the innards of sheep (including heart, lungs, and liver).

According to some sources, the wild haggis's left and right legs are of different lengths (like the sidehill gouger and the dahu), allowing it to run quickly around the steep mountains and hillsides which make up its natural habitat, but only in one direction. It is further claimed that there are two varieties of haggis, one with longer left legs and the other with longer right legs. The former variety can run clockwise around a mountain (as seen from above) while the latter can run anticlockwise. The two varieties coexist peacefully but are unable to interbreed in the wild because in order for the male of one variety to mate with a female of the other, he must turn to face in the same direction as his intended mate, causing him to lose his balance before he can mount her. As a result of this difficulty, differences in leg length among the haggis population are accentuated.

According to an online survey commissioned by haggis manufacturers Hall's of Broxburn, released on 26 November 2003, one-third of U.S. visitors to Scotland believed the wild haggis to be a real creature.

== See also ==
- Sidehill gouger
- Dahu, another fictional animal also said to exist in "clockwise" and "anticlockwise" varieties
- Jackalope
- Wolpertinger
- Drop bear
- Tree octopus
