= Wolpertinger =

German mythological hybrid animal

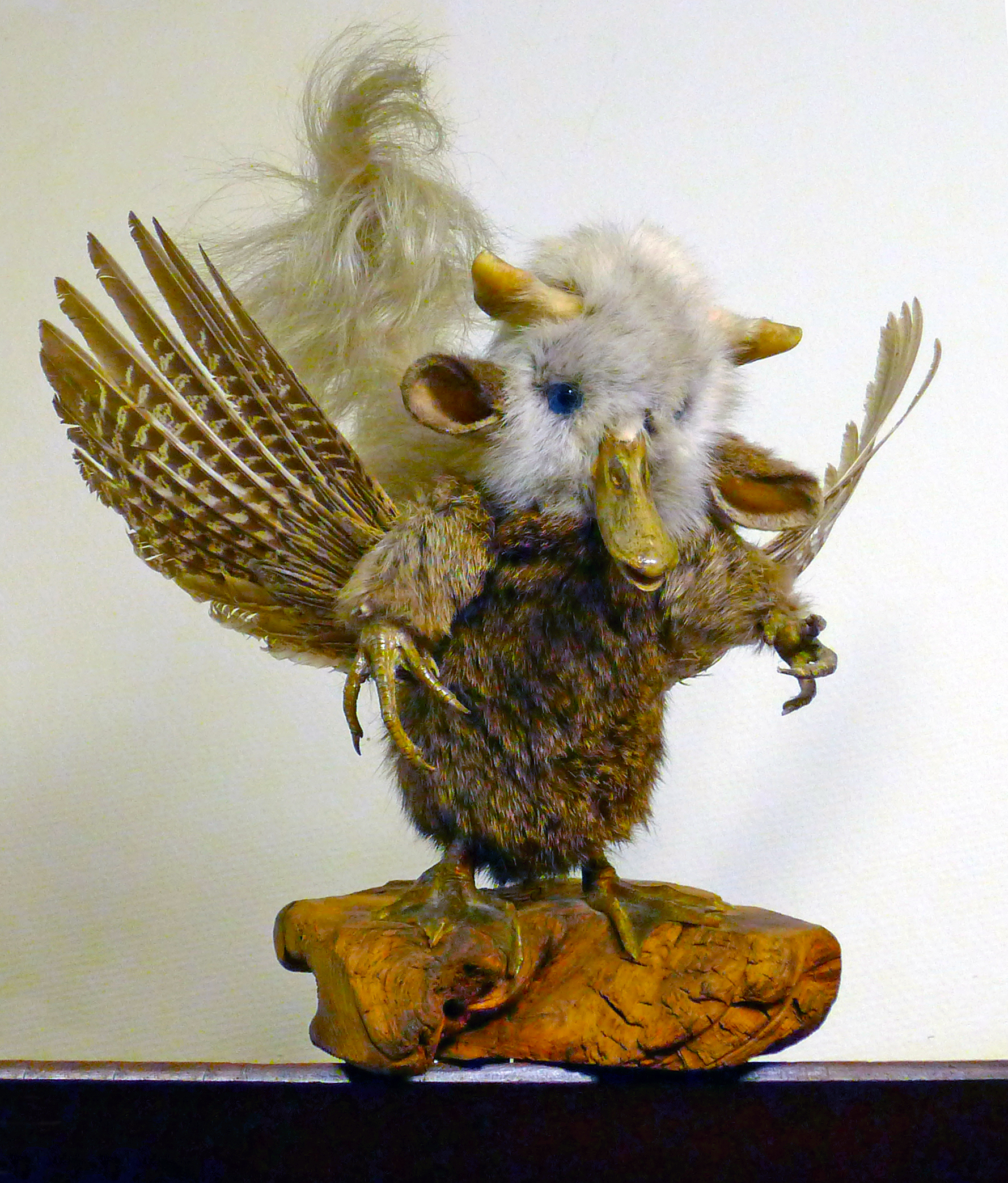
- An example of a stuffed Wolpertinger on display in the Rheinfelder Beerhall, Zürich

Creature information
- Other name(s): Oibadrischl; Raurackl; Rammeschucksn
- Grouping: popular folklore
- Folklore: German folklore

Origin
- Country: Germany
- Region: Bavarian Alps
- Habitat: Forests

In German folklore, a Wolpertinger (German: [ˈvɔlpɐtɪŋɐ], also called Wolperdinger or Woiperdinger) is an animal said to inhabit the alpine forests of Bavaria and Baden-Württemberg in Southern Germany.

== Origins ==
Images of creatures that may be Wolpertingers have been found in woodcuts and engravings dating back to the 17th century, though they might be images of rabbits infected by the Shope papilloma virus which causes tumors that can resemble horns or antlers. The origin of the name is unclear, but may come from glassmakers from the village of Wolterdingen who made schnapps glasses shaped like animals, which they called "Wolterdinger." The Wolpertinger myth has increased in popularity over the past two centuries because of taxidermies created by Bavarian taxidermists in the 1800s for fun and to sell to tourists as "local wildlife."

== Description ==
It has a body comprising various animal parts – generally wings, antlers, a tail, and fangs; all attached to the body of a small mammal. The most widespread description portrays the Wolpertinger as having the head of a rabbit, the body of a squirrel, the antlers of a deer, and the wings and occasionally the legs of a pheasant. No two Wolpertinger look alike because they are supposedly the result of crossbreeding between animals in the area such as foxes, roebucks, hares, ducks, and pheasants.

According to folklore, Wolpertingers can be found in the forests of Bavaria. The folklore states that Wolpertingers only show themselves to beautiful maidens on a full moon if they are taken into secluded parts of the Bavarian forests by the right man.

Stuffed "Wolpertingers", composed of parts of real animals that have been stuffed, are often displayed in inns or sold to tourists as souvenirs in the animal's "native regions". The Deutsches Jagd- und Fischereimuseum in Munich, Germany features a permanent exhibit on the creature.

It resembles other creatures from German folklore, such as the Rasselbock of the Thuringian Forest, the Dilldapp of the Alemannic region, and the Elwedritsche of the Palatinate region, which accounts describe as a chicken-like creature with antlers; additionally, the American Jackalope as well as the Swedish Skvader somewhat resemble the Wolpertinger. The Austrian counterpart of the Wolpertinger is the Raurakl.

Variant regional spellings of the name include Wolperdinger, Woipertingers, and Volpertinger. They are part of a larger family of horned mammals that exist throughout the Germanic regions of Europe, such as the Austrian Raurackl, which is nearly identical to the German Wolpertinger.

== In popular culture ==
- Rumo, a "Wolperting", is the main character of the novel Rumo and His Miraculous Adventures by Walter Moers, depicted as an anthropomorphic dog with horns.
- Wolpertingers are available as pets in World of Warcraft during special events.

== See also ==
- Al-mi'raj
- Cabbit
- Elwetritsch
- Jackalope
- Lepus cornutus
- Rasselbock
- Skvader
