= Bohemond =

Bohemond or Bohemund is a masculine given name which may refer to:

- Bohemond I of Antioch (1058–1111)
- Bohemond II of Antioch (1108–1130)
- Bohemond III of Antioch (1144–1201)
- Bohemond IV of Antioch and I of Tripoli (1172–1233)
- Bohemond V of Antioch and II of Tripoli (1199–1252)
- Bohemond VI of Antioch and III of Tripoli (1237–1275)
- Bohemond VII of Antioch and IV of Tripoli (1261–1287)
- Bohemond I of Manoppello (died 1156)
- Bohemond II of Manoppello (died 1169)
- Bohemond I, Archbishop of Trier (died 1299)
- Bohemond II, Archbishop of Trier (died 1367)
- Bohemond, Duke of Apulia (born 1182)
- Bohemond of Astarac (died after 1176)
