= Crank Dat Killer =

- Atlanta episode
- Episode no.: Season 4 Episode 6
- Directed by: Hiro Murai
- Written by: Stephen Glover
- Cinematography by: Christian Sprenger
- Editing by: Kyle Reiter
- Production code: XAA04006
- Original air date: October 13, 2022
- Running time: 27 minutes

Guest appearances
- Adrian Mauro as Roberto; Soulja Boy as himself; Terence Rosemore as Shoeman

Episode chronology
| ← Previous "Work Ethic!" | Next → "Snipe Hunt" |
- Atlanta season 4

"Crank Dat Killer" is the sixth episode of the fourth season of the American comedy-drama television series Atlanta. It is the 37th overall episode of the series and was written by executive producer Stephen Glover, and directed by executive producer Hiro Murai. It was first broadcast on FX in the United States on October 13, 2022.

The series is set in Atlanta and follows Earnest "Earn" Marks, as he tries to redeem himself in the eyes of his ex-girlfriend Van, who is also the mother of his daughter Lottie; as well as his parents and his cousin Alfred, who raps under the stage name "Paper Boi"; and Darius, Alfred's eccentric right-hand man. After staying in Europe for a tour during the previous season, the season sees the characters back in Atlanta. In the episode, a serial killer targets people that post videos dancing to Soulja Boy's "Crank That". Alfred remembers that he posted a dance video in 2007 and becomes paranoid. Meanwhile, Earn and Darius attempt to get Nike sneakers from a reseller.

According to Nielsen Media Research, the episode was seen by an estimated 0.253 million household viewers and gained a 0.08 ratings share among adults aged 18–49. The episode received critical acclaim, with critics praising the directing, writing, humor, tone, intensity of the episode and the performances, particularly Brian Tyree Henry.

== Plot ==
While talking with Earn (Donald Glover) and Darius (Lakeith Stanfield), Alfred (Brian Tyree Henry) is informed about the "Crank Dat Killer": a number of black people have been killed after performing a dance video to Soulja Boy's "Crank That", which suggests that this might be the serial killer's motive. Earn and Darius mock the situation, until they discover that Alfred posted a video of himself dancing to the song back in 2007. Alfred is unable to take down the video, as a friend of his that he lost contact with posted it, but he remains unbothered as the video barely made it past 20 views.

After finishing a recording session, Alfred is told that a young rapper known as "Some Guy Named Doug" (Wisdom Allah) has arrived at the building. Doug has been asking him for a collaboration, but Alfred is reluctant to do it because he considers Doug's music subpar. He throws alcohol on the mixing console as an excuse to leave the session. At the parking lot, he checks his "Crank That" video and discovers that a user left a "☠️" emoji in the comments section. Meanwhile, a Hispanic rapper named Roberto (Adrian Mauro) arrives to work at the mall. He explains to his girlfriend that he just needs the right opportunity to present his talent to an established rapper. At the parking lot, Earn and Darius meet with a reseller known as "The Shoe Man" (Terence Rosemore) to get some Nike sneakers. The man has the shoe sizes they want, but instead of giving them a price, he asks them to kiss each other. Earn refuses to go through with it out of principle.

Alfred contacts Soulja Boy to learn if he's worried about the killer. When he mentions the video he made, he is told that he must flee to a "safe farm", which is Soulja Boy's plan. After hanging up, Alfred hears thumping noises in his house, so he decides to leave. Alfred arrives at the mall where he is recognized by a clerk. Roberto, who works nearby offering free samples, is informed of Alfred's location and he rushes off to find him. Outside the mall, Alfred notices a man getting out of his car and calling out for him. (Note: This character was alluded to in "The Streisand Effect".) Alfred hurriedly enters the mall and tries to hide behind a stall until the man shoots at him. As Alfred ducks for cover, he sees multiple bystanders pulling out guns and, in the confusion, firing at the shooter as well as other people carrying guns. As Alfred runs, Roberto finds him and starts rapping, only to be thrown through a glass window by a frenzied Alfred.

Back in the parking lot, the Shoe Man demands that Earn and Darius kiss for at least two minutes to get the sneakers. After debating on their value, they decide to go through with his request, reducing it to three seconds. While Earn and Darius kiss, the shooter tries to hit a civilian and accidentally hits the Shoe Man in the face, killing him. Realizing that he's dead, Earn and Darius quickly flee with the sneakers. As the shooter engages in a gunfight with the police, Alfred is picked up by Doug in his car and the two of them flee the area. Grateful to Doug for saving him, Alfred reluctantly agrees to drive with him to the studio and finally record a song together.

That night, Earn and Darius visit Alfred, who seems to have taken Soulja Boy's advice to heart as he plans on starting a farm. They inform him that the police arrested the Crank Dat Killer, an entirely different man none of them have encountered, while the mall shooter turns out to be a high school nemesis of Alfred's. Darius shows off his new shoes without disclosing how he and Earn got them, while Alfred doesn't mention that he was involved in the shooting. Alfred receives a recording of his song with Doug and he plays it on his phone while looking visibly pained. Earn notes that it's more "sound than music", while Darius says that "it's trash" and that the rhythm is impossible to dance to. He still ends up dancing to it.

== Production ==
=== Development ===
"Ay, Ya'll remember how we used to hit the club and do the Pool Palace and Crank Dat and nobody got shot? Yeah me neither."

— Official description in the press release for the episode.

In September 2022, FX announced that the sixth episode of the season would be titled "Crank Dat Killer" and that it would be written by executive producer Stephen Glover and directed by executive producer Hiro Murai. This was Glover's eleventh writing credit, and Murai's 23rd directing credit.

=== Writing ===
Roberto trying to meet with Alfred was based on the assumption that meeting with popular rappers would elevate struggling rappers. Stephen Glover explained, "This idea that all it takes is for you to meet your idol, and it's all gonna work out. People put all these things onto celebrities. They treat celebrities like they're a part of their movie; their only purpose is to fulfill your dreams. I just thought it would be funny if this guy had this vision that this is going to happen, and he just picked the worst possible time."

The mall shootout was based on many incidents in Atlanta, which has been reported to have many shootouts at malls. According to Glover, "It feels like everybody in Atlanta has a gun. I thought it was funny, this idea people have that guns are gonna make situations better, but here's a shootout in the mall and it just turns into chaos." Alfred's near-death experiences were based on the idea that many rappers were killed in their hometowns, to indicate that the "specter of death" follows Alfred. The writers also intended that by Alfred not revealing the events at the mall, it would mean that it is "another day in the life" for him.

=== Casting ===
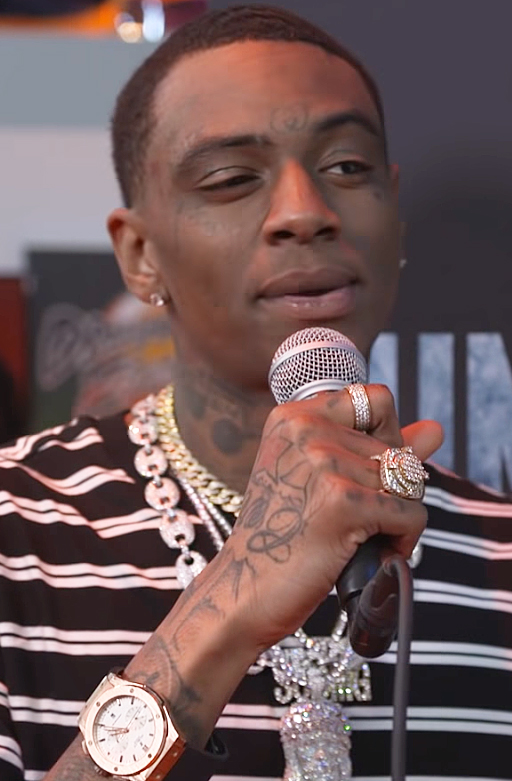
Soulja Boy guest stars in the episode as himself.

The episode featured a guest appearance by Soulja Boy playing himself, who agreed to appear after knowing that Donald Glover was involved. The writers intended for him to appear, with no backup plan in case he rejected the offer. Had Soulja Boy rejected the role, the crew considered having another actor to portray him or get Fabo in his place.

== Reception ==
=== Viewers ===
The episode was watched by 0.253 million viewers, earning a 0.08 in the 18-49 rating demographics on the Nielson ratings scale. This means that 0.08 percent of all households with televisions watched the episode. This was a massive 116% increase from the previous episode, which was watched by 0.117 million viewers with a 0.05 in the 18-49 demographics.

=== Critical reviews ===
"Crank Dat Killer" received critical acclaim. The review aggregator website Rotten Tomatoes reported a 100% approval rating, based on 5 reviews with an average rating of 8/10.

Quinci LeGardye of The A.V. Club gave the episode a "B+" and writing, "When considering the literal events of the episode, 'Crank Dat Killer' could've solidly fit in Robbin' Season, or even into a hypothetical run between the show's four hiatus years. It's a step away from timeless, thanks to Al's plot focus on viral Internet dances. The themes take on another layer of meaning when placing the events within the trio's come-up, especially when it's bookmarked by Al's gorgeous new house. There isn't a lot of character development, maybe Al considering buying a Safe Farm somewhere, and that's fine. Sometimes we just need to laugh our asses off and watch Donald Glover and LaKeith Stanfield kiss."

Alan Sepinwall of Rolling Stone wrote, "It feels strange to describe an episode like this, built around an active shooter situation, as a relatively light one for Atlanta, yet dammit if 'Crank Dat Killer' doesn't feel exactly that. Yes, Al spends a good chunk of the episode running for his life, and Earn and Darius' new acquaintance Shoe Man suffers a violent and graphic on-camera death. But 'Crank Dat Killer' once again demonstrates the series' complete mastery of tone, in a way that makes the threat to Al seem real at the same time that the entire sequence is way more slapstick than thriller."

Ile-Ife Okantah of Vulture gave the episode a 4 star rating out of 5 and wrote, "Now that we're past the midseason mark, I can confidently say this final season of Atlanta is outpacing the previous one by a mile. The critiques of modern-day culture are sharper, the comedy is increasingly on point, and Brian Tyree Henry's acting is such a pleasure to watch. Over the years, his portrayal of Al has created a fascinating, beautifully developed character arc that adds to the show's success. I feel that way about Zazie Beetz's, LaKeith Stanfield's, and Donald Glover's characters, too, but this episode is a showcase for Henry's talent." Christian Hubbard of Full Circle Cinema gave the episode a perfect 10 out of 10 rating and wrote, "As it turns out, the Crank Dat Killer is some random person and none of the suspects above. However, the forty minutes of pure speculation and anxiety just prove why this series will stand the test of time when season four concludes its historic run. With only four episodes left, Atlanta is not taking their foot off the pedal and is well on its way to creating an iconic final season."
