= Bohemond of Tarsia =

Bohemond of Tarsia (died c. 1156) was the Norman count of Tarsia and Manoppello in the Abruzzi. Invested by Roger II of Sicily on an unknown date, Bohemond's politics centred on controlling the monastery of Casauria.

Bohemond had the support of Robert of Selby, the chancellor of the kingdom of Sicily, in attempting to get control of Casauria. He himself almost convinced the abbot, Oldrico, that the king had ceded it to him, but Roger intervened to prevent the deception. He did not molest Casauria itself, but he was forced in 1144 to return S. Andrea and S. Salvatore della Maiella to its jurisdiction.

On 22 August 1148, he appeared as a justiciar.

In 1152, Tremiti put itself under Bohemond's protection. In 1153, Oldrico died and one Leo, a relative of Bohemond's wife, was elected to replace him. The abbey, however, requested nullification from Roger in order to elect one Constantine, whom Pope Eugene III deposed. The situation became more confused when Bohemond besieged Constantine in Casauria, but Pope Anastasius IV told him to quit the monastic conflict. In 1154, Bohemond, now opposed to the popes, was ordered to attack Adrian IV as a loyal vassal of Roger. The chancellor Asclettin ordered Robert III of Loritello to lend Bohemond his troops. Robert revolted and Bohemond turned against him and began annexing his counties. At this time, Leo was approved in Casauria. Bohemond was at the height of his career.

In 1156, Bohemond refused to surrender all he had gained to the new king William I and was consequently imprisoned in Palermo. He was soon liberated and restored, for he never wavered in his loyalty. He died not long after his release and was succeeded by Bohemond II, probably a relation. He had a second son recorded by Falcandus named Carbonellus.

== Sources ==
- Norwich, John Julius. The Kingdom in the Sun 1130-1194. Longman: London, 1970.
- Matthew, Donald. The Norman Kingdom of Sicily. Cambridge University Press: 1992.
- Houben, Hubert. Roger II of Sicily: A Ruler between East and West. Trans. G. A. Loud and Diane Milbourne. Cambridge University Press: 2002.
