= Skvader =

Fictional animal

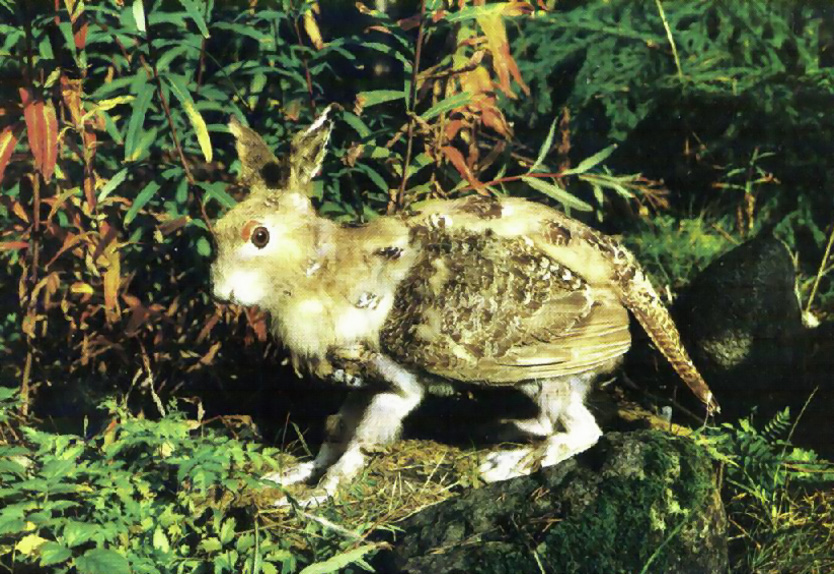
Rudolf Granberg's prepared skvader

The skvader (pronounced [ˈskvɑ̌ːdɛr]) is a Swedish fictional creature that was constructed in 1918 by the taxidermist Rudolf Granberg and is permanently displayed at the museum at Norra Berget in Sundsvall. It has the head, forequarters and hindlegs of a European hare (Lepus europaeus), and the back, wings and tail of a female wood grouse (Tetrao urogallus). It was later jokingly given the Latin name Tetrao lepus pseudo-hybridus rarissimus L.

The term has taken on a general meaning of two disparate elements put together, often conveying a sense of a less fortunate such combination.

== Name ==
The name is a combination of two words, explained by the Svenska Akademiens ordbok (Dictionary of the Swedish Academy) as being from the "prefix skva- from skvattra (quack or chirp), and the suffix -der from tjäder (wood grouse)".

== Origins ==
The skvader originates from a tall tale hunting story told by a man named Håkan Dahlmark during a dinner at a restaurant in Sundsvall in the beginning of the 20th century. To the amusement of the other guests, Dahlmark claimed that he in 1874 had shot such an animal during a hunt north of Sundsvall. On his birthday in 1907, his housekeeper jokingly presented him with a painting of the animal, made by her nephew and shortly before his death in 1912, Dahlmark donated the painting to a local museum. During an exhibition in Örnsköldsvik in 1916 the manager of the museum became acquainted with the taxidermist Rudolf Granberg. He then mentioned the hunting story and the painting and asked Granberg if he could re-construct the animal. In 1918 Granberg had completed the skvader and it has since then been a very popular exhibition item at the museum, which also has the painting on display.

== Similar creatures ==
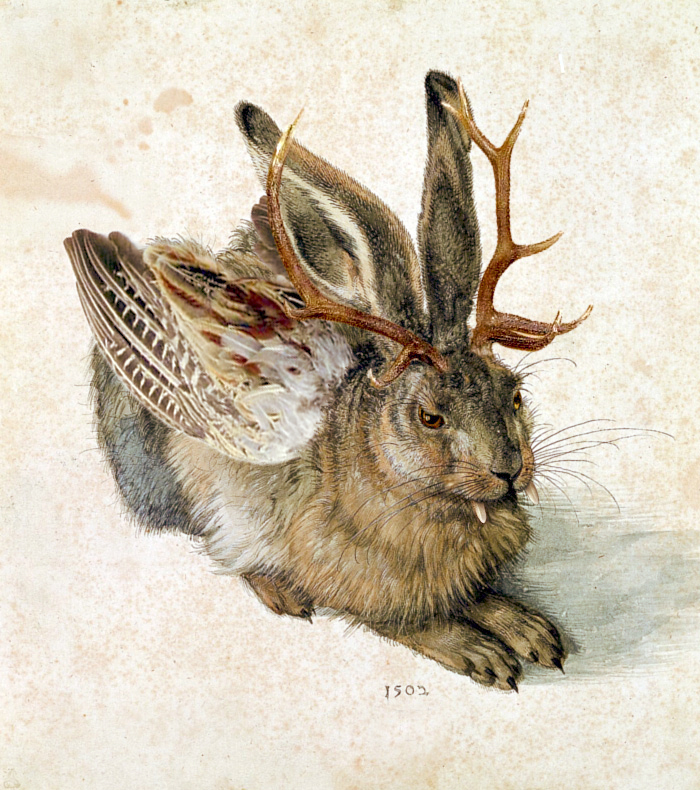
Wolpertinger edited from a drawing of a hare by Albrecht Dürer.

A strikingly similar creature called the "rabbit-bird" was described by Pliny the Elder in Natural History. This creature had the body of a bird with a rabbit's head and was said to have inhabited the Alps.

Other similar creatures include the Bavarian wolpertinger, the Austrian raurakl, the Thuringian Forest's rasselbock, the Palatinate's Elwedritsche, and the American jackalope.

== Symbolism ==
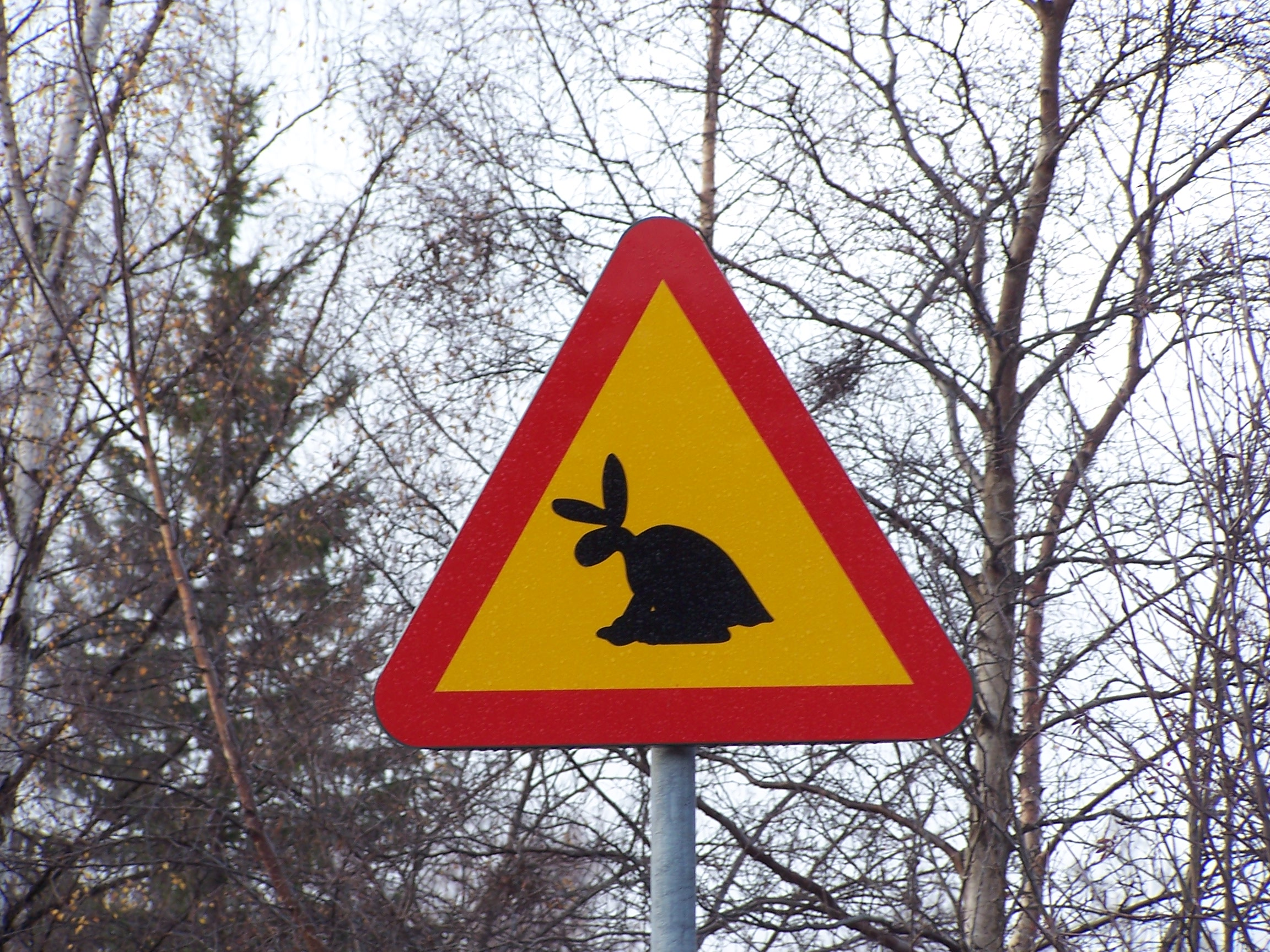
A road sign on the approach to the museum warns drivers for skvaders on the road.

The skvader has since then often been seen as an unofficial symbol of Sundsvall and when the province Medelpad was to be given a provincial animal (in addition to the provincial flower) in 1987, many locals voted for the skvader. The final choice was a kind of compromise, the mountain hare, which is the front-end of the skvader.

== Other uses ==
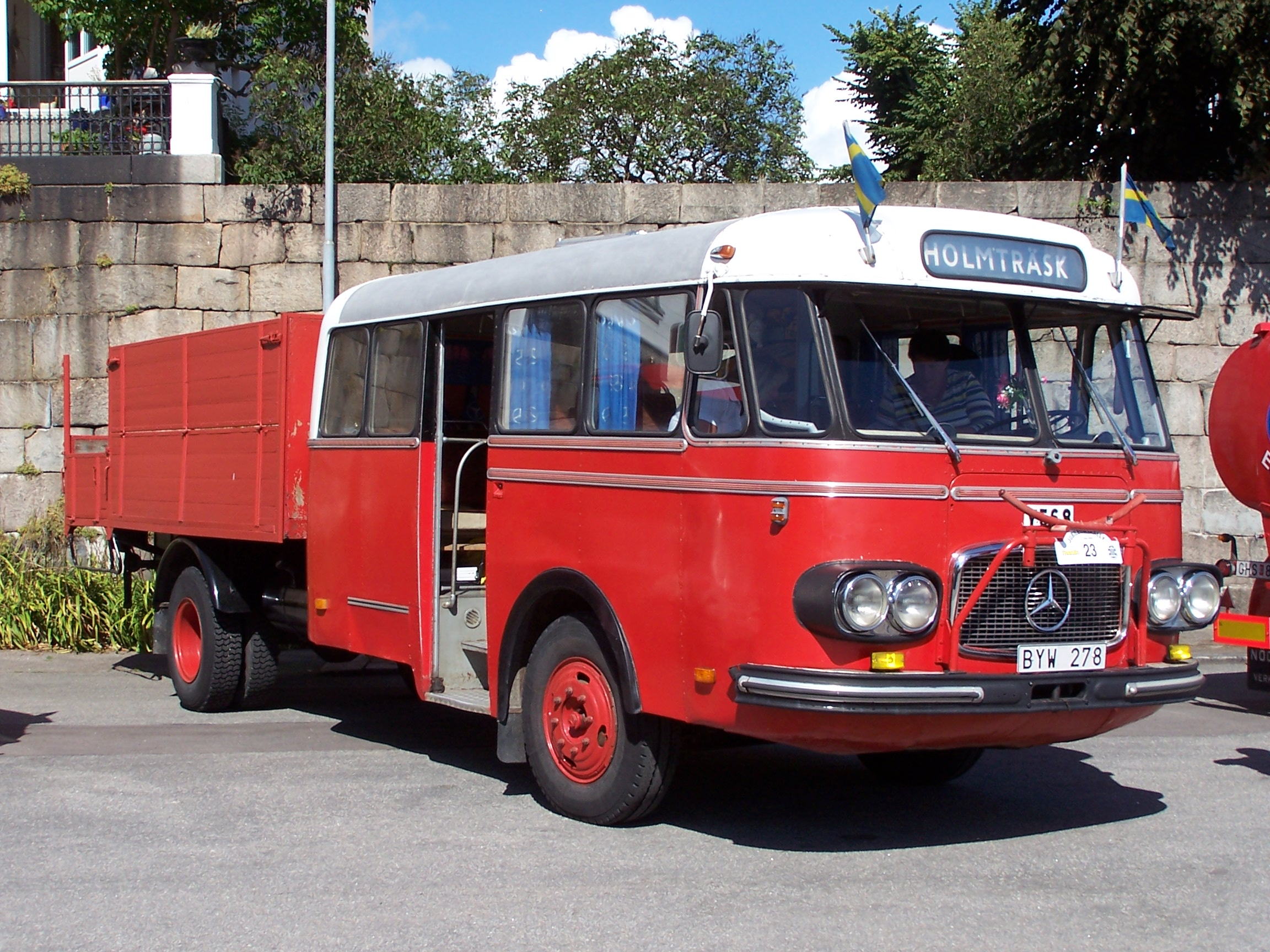
A typical skvader bus

The term skvader can be used colloquially in Swedish to mean 'a combination of contradicting elements'.

Skvader also became the nickname in the 1950s and 1960s for a bruck, a combination of bus and truck (lorry in British English) with the front-end of a bus taking passengers and the back-end as an open loading bay. The skvader was used on small bus routes in Norrland and to deliver milk from small farmers to the nearest dairy.

"Skvaderns" is also a herbal liqueur made with herbs from the forest Lunde Skog, the place Skvaderns first were shot at.
