= Sidehill gouger =

Mythical creature from American folklore

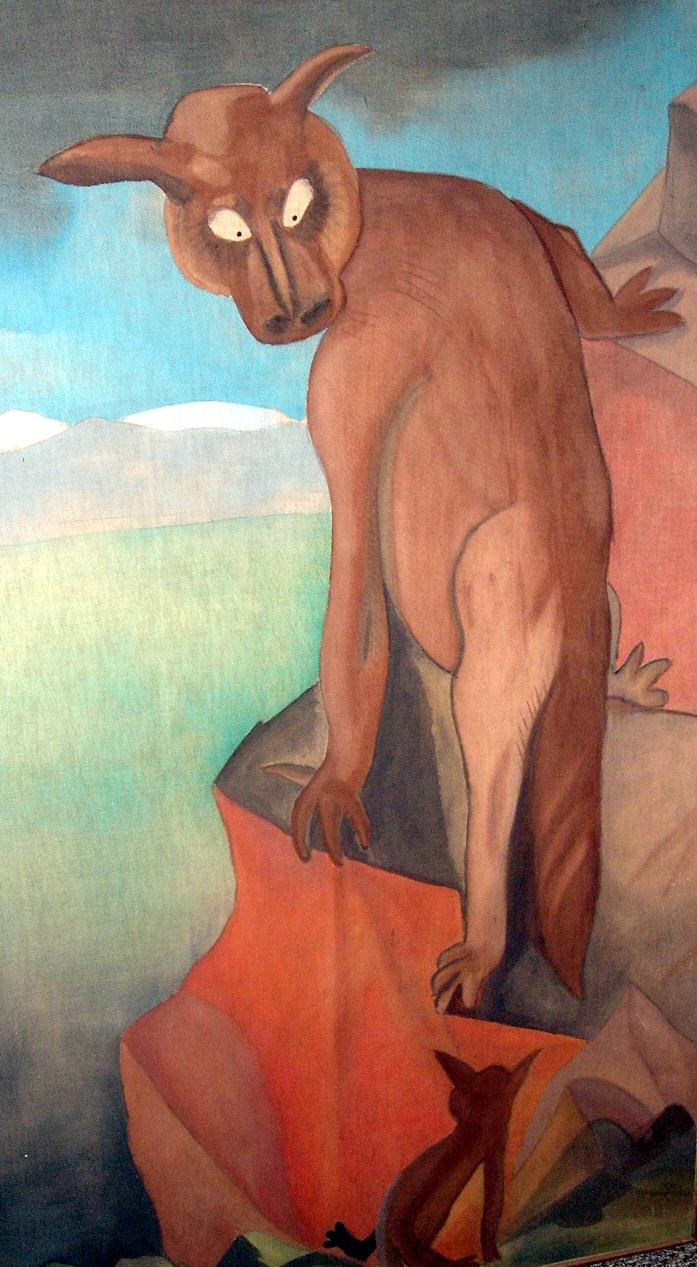
The Sidehill Gouger: a "left-sided" mother looks forlornly at her "right-sided" pup.

In American folklore, a sidehill gouger or gyascutus is a fearsome critter adapted to living on hillsides by having legs on one side of their body shorter than the legs on the opposite side, having evolved to resemble a variety of mammals, including pangolins, goats, humans, and bears. This peculiarity allows them to walk on steep hillsides, although only in one direction; when lured or chased into the plain, they are trapped in an endless circular path. Some claim these creatures play a large role in, and in some cases are responsible for, the creation of hoodoos. The creature is variously known as the Sidehill Dodger Sidehill Hoofer, or Side-hill Gazink.

Sidehill gougers are mammals who dwell in hillside burrows, and are occasionally depicted as laying eggs. There are usually 6 to 8 pups to a litter. Since the gouger is footed for hillsides, it cannot stand up on level ground. If by accident a gouger falls from a hill, it can easily be captured or starve to death. When a clockwise gouger meets a counter-clockwise gouger, they have to fight to the death since they can only go in one direction. The formation of terracettes has been attributed to gouger activity.

Gougers are said to have migrated to the west from New England, a feat accomplished by a pair of gougers who clung to each other in a fashion comparable to "a pair of drunks going home from town with their longer legs on the outer sides". A Vermont variation is known as the Wampahoofus. It was reported that farmers crossbreed them with their cows so they could graze easily on mountain sides. Others claim that a pair of Wampahoofus circle the summit of Mount Mansfield, mating as their paths cross.

Frank C. Whitmore and Nicholas Hotton, in their joint tongue-in-cheek response to an article in Smithsonian Magazine, expounded the taxonomy of sidehill gougers (Membriinequales declivitous), noting in particular "the sidehill dodger, which inhabits the Driftless Area of Wisconsin; the dextrosinistral limb ratio approaches unity although the metapodials on the downhill side are noticeably stouter." A special award, the Order of the Sidehill Gouger, is awarded to worthy members for hard and long standing volunteer efforts by the Alberta Group of the Royal Canadian Air Force Association.

== In popular culture ==
- "Deadhead Mile" (2016) by K.N. Johnson (included in the anthology A Journey of Words) suggest gougers to be the culprits behind ski trails with dead ends.
- Sidehill Gouger (2009) by Canned Games is a puzzle game on Xbox Live for Xbox 360, featuring a young boy hunting the sidehill gougers of his grandfather's stories.
- Storyteller John Dashney featured the sidehill gouger (referred to as the "sidehill wowser") in a story supposedly about his grandfather, who specialized in hunting the creatures to the point of stretching his hounds' legs to help them chase the creatures better along hillsides. The story details an encounter in which his grandfather stumbled across two gougers at a time, resulting in a harrowing spiral chase up a hill until the opposite-oriented creatures crashed into one another, solving his problem.
- In McBroom's Zoo by Sid Fleischman a Sidehill Gouger is one of the fantastic animals Josh McBroom exhibits in his zoo to raise money for the recovery of his farm after the topsoil was carried off by a tornado.

== See also ==
- Dahu
- Wild haggis
