= Dahu =

Mythical creature

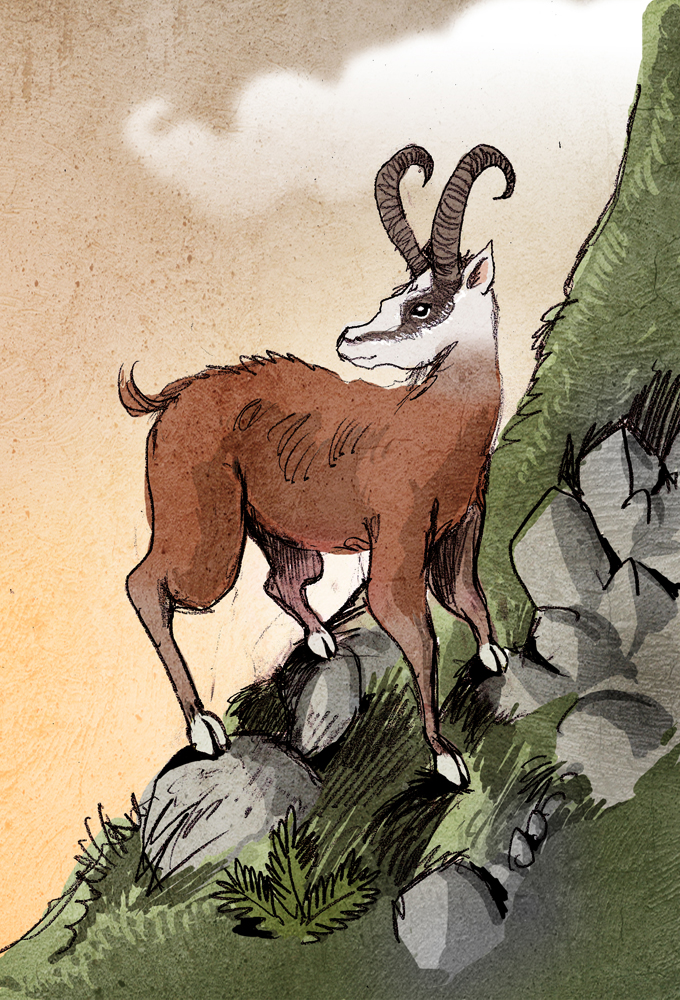
A depiction of the mythical dahu

The dahu (French pronunciation: [da.y]) is a legendary creature that resembles a mountain goat and is well known in France and francophone regions of Switzerland and Italy, including the Aosta Valley. The dahu, a quadrupedal mammal, may have been inspired by the chamois, a small, horned goat-antelope once plentiful in European mountainous regions, and also resembles the ibex.

Regional variations on its name include dahut or dairi in Jura, darou in Vosges, daru in Picardy, darhut in Burgundy, daù in Val Camonica; also called a tamarou in Aubrac and Aveyron, and tamarro in Catalonia and Andorra. The dahu cub is called a dahuot.

== Description ==
The dahu's principal distinguishing characteristic is that the legs on one side of its body are shorter than the legs on the opposite side, to facilitate standing on and walking on steep mountain slopes. In practical terms, the dahu's asymmetrical limbs allow it to walk around the circumference of the mountain in only one direction. Therefore, there are two different types of dahu: the laevogyrous dahu, with shorter legs on its left side, walks around the mountain counterclockwise; the dextrogyre dahu, with the shorter legs on its right side, walks clockwise around the mountain. Respectively, the terms dahu senestrus and dahu desterus have also been used.

== Hunting dahu ==
The "dahu hunt" (French: chasse au dahu), similar to another wildlife-related practical joke, the snipe hunt, is a prank in which pranksters may take a victim out at night with the stated intention of catching a dahu only to abandon the victim on the mountain. Jokers may also tell a gullible subject that to catch a dahu requires two people: one with a bag, and another who is good at imitating dahu sounds. The former stands at the bottom of the slope, and the other behind a dahu. When the dahu turns around to see the source of the sound, it will lose its balance and roll down the slope to the person with the bag.

== The rise of the dahu ==
The dahu is a staple of 20th-century French popular culture, known in Lorraine, in the mountainous regions of eastern France (the Alpes and Jura Mountains), and in French-speaking Switzerland as a theme of jokes among natives and a spoof for fooling young children. Its popularity began to soar toward the end of the 19th century. The budding tourism industry brought to the mountains wealthy city dwellers with a somewhat arrogant attitude and a paltry knowledge of the countryside. The mountaineers working as hunting guides would take advantage of the gullibility of some tourists to lure them into the "dahu hunt" (French: chasse au dahu). The animal was touted as a rare and precious bounty, the capture thereof required waiting alone all night on a chilly slope, crouched in an uncomfortable position. In the second half of the 20th century, the supply of naive hunters had dried up, and the dahu hunt enjoyed a second life as a summer camp practical joke.

== The dahu today ==
As of the last decades of the 20th century, the dahu is widely recognized as a tall tale and a source of humor. The Alps Museum in the Bard Fort, Aosta Valley, dedicated a part of its permanent exhibition to Dahu. It has been adopted by other mountainous regions such as the Pyrenees. Recreational "dahu hunts" are sometimes organized as outdoor activities in France and Switzerland. There are dahu websites and dahu aficionados, such as Marcel Jacquat, former director, now retired, of the Natural Science Museum of La Chaux-de-Fonds in Switzerland, who wrote a monograph and opened an exhibition devoted to the animal on 1 April 1995. On 1 April 1967, the Prefect of Haute-Savoie (France) officially made the mountainous suburbs of the small town of Reignier a "Dahu Sanctuary" where hunting and photography are forbidden. There have been alleged contemporary witnesses of the Dahu in the Athenian neighborhood of Exarchia. Locals reportedly heard the sounds of its presence emanating from the construction site of the neighborhood's forthcoming subway station.

== See also ==
- Peña Dahu – a French aircraft design named after the animal
- Sidehill gouger
- Snipe hunt
- Fearsome critters
- Wild haggis
