= Jackalope =

Mythical creature from American folklore

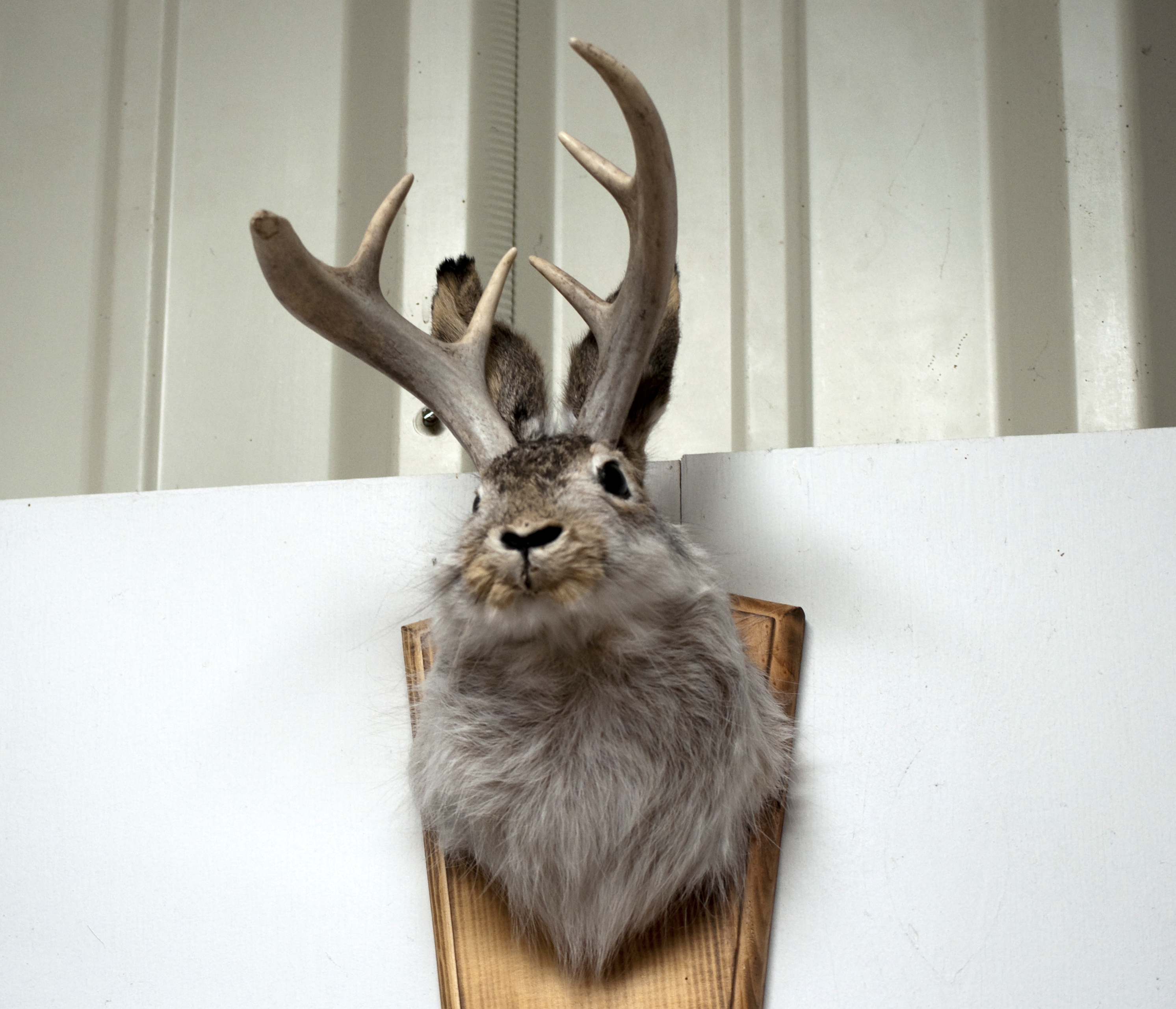
- Jackalope taxidermy mount in a restaurant in Kansas

Creature information
- Grouping: Mythological hybrids
- Sub grouping: Fearsome critter
- Similar entities: Wolpertinger

Origin
- Habitat: Western North America

The jackalope is a mythical animal of North American folklore described as a jackrabbit with antelope horns. The word jackalope is a portmanteau of jackrabbit and antelope. Many jackalope taxidermy mounts, including the original, are made with deer antlers.

In the 1930s, Douglas Herrick and his brother, hunters with taxidermy skills, popularized the American jackalope by grafting deer antlers onto a jackrabbit carcass and selling the combination to a local hotel in Douglas, Wyoming. Thereafter, they made and sold many similar jackalopes to a retail outlet in South Dakota, and other taxidermists continue to manufacture the horned rabbits into the 21st century. Stuffed and mounted, jackalopes are found in many bars and other places in the United States; stores catering to tourists sell jackalope postcards and other paraphernalia, and commercial entities in America and elsewhere have used the word jackalope or a jackalope logo as part of their marketing strategies. The jackalope has appeared in published stories, poems, television shows, video games, and a low-budget mockumentary film. The Wyoming Legislature has considered bills to make the jackalope the state's official mythological creature.

The underlying legend of the jackalope, upon which the Wyoming taxidermists were building, may be related to similar stories in other cultures and other historical times. Researchers suggest that at least some of the tales of horned hares were inspired by sightings of rabbits infected with the Shope papilloma virus. It causes horn- and antler-like tumors to grow in various places on a rabbit's head and body.

Folklorists see the jackalope as one of a group of tall tale animals, known as fearsome critters, common to North American culture since the turn of the twentieth century. These fabulous beasts appear in tall tales and lend themselves to comic hoaxes by entrepreneurs who seek attention for their own personal or the region's fortune.

== Name ==
Jackalope is a portmanteau of jackrabbit and antelope.

Jackrabbits are actually hares, rather than rabbits, though both are mammals in the family Leporidae. Wyoming is home to three species of hares, all in the genus Lepus. These are the black-tailed jackrabbit, the white-tailed jackrabbit, and the snowshoe hare.

The nominal antelope is not any kind of true, Old World antelope, but actually the pronghorn or American antelope (Antilocapra americana), which is more closely related to the giraffe. Some of the largest herds of wild pronghorns, which are found only in western North America, are in Wyoming. The adults grow to about 3 feet (1 m) tall, weigh up to 150 pounds (68 kg), and can run at sustained speeds approaching 60 miles per hour (97 km/h).

== Origins ==
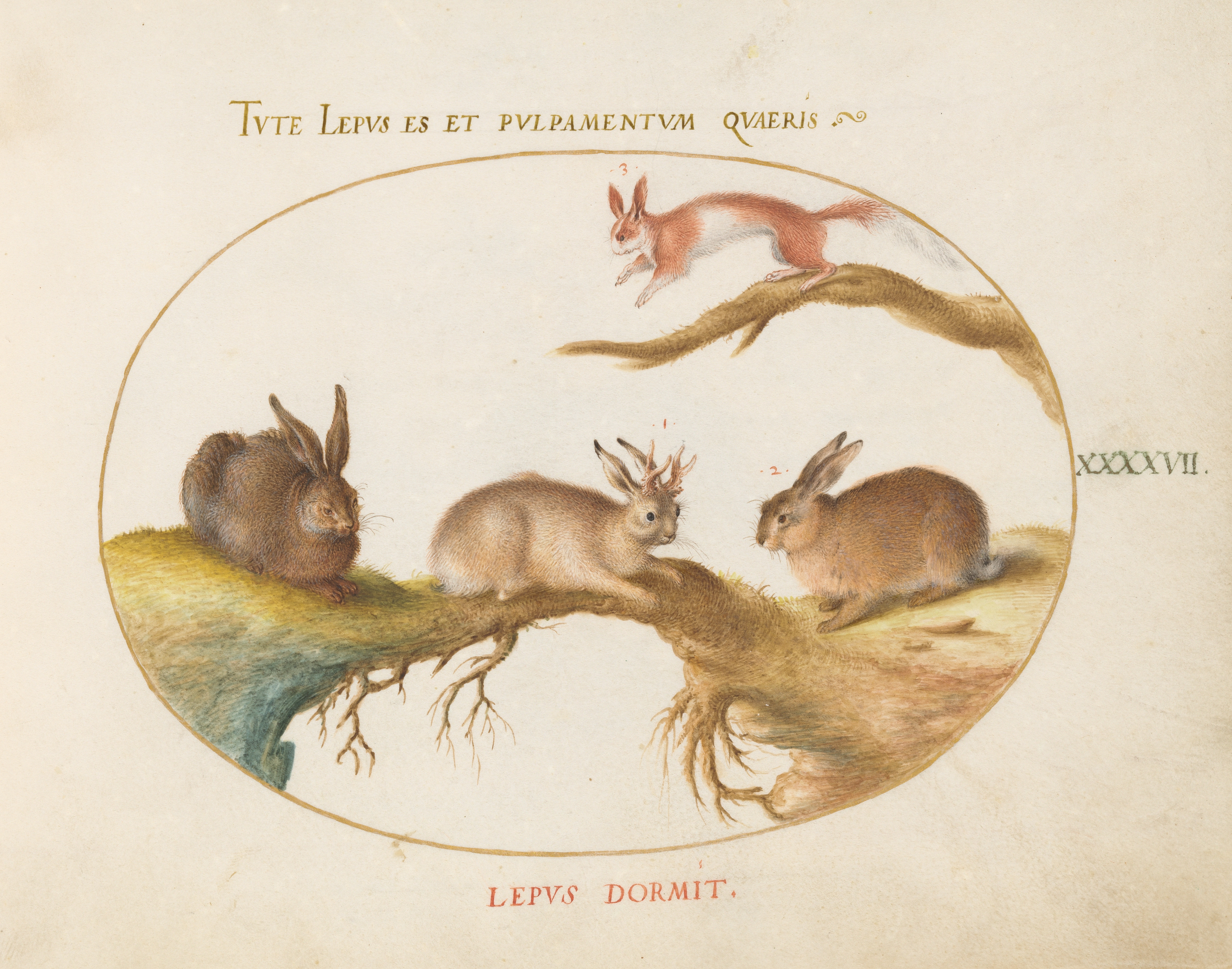
Plate XLVII of Animalia Qvadrvpedia et Reptilia (Terra) by Joris Hoefnagel, circa 1575, showing a "horned hare"

Stories or descriptions of animal hybrids have appeared in many cultures worldwide. A 13th-century Persian work depicts a rabbit with a single horn, like a unicorn. In Europe, the horned rabbit appeared in Medieval and Renaissance folklore in Bavaria (the wolpertinger) and elsewhere. Natural history texts such as Historiae Naturalis de Quadrupetibus Libri (The History Book of Natural Quadrupeds) by Joannes Jonstonus (John Jonston) in the 17th century and illustrations such as Animalia Qvadrvpedia et Reptilia (Terra): Plate XLVII by Joris Hoefnagel (1522–1600) in the 16th century included the horned hare. These early scientific texts described and illustrated the hybrids as though they were real creatures, but by the end of the 18th century scientists generally rejected the idea of horned hares as a biological species.

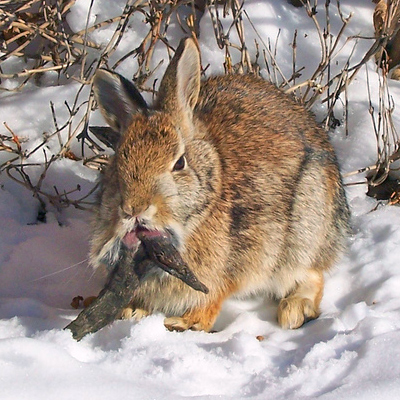
Rabbit with Shope papilloma virus infection

References to horned rabbits may originate in sightings of rabbits affected by the Shope papilloma virus, named for Richard E. Shope, M.D., who described it in a scientific journal in 1933. Shope initially examined wild cottontail rabbits that had been shot by hunters in Iowa and later examined wild rabbits from Kansas. They had "numerous horn-like protuberances on the skin over various parts of their bodies. The animals were referred to popularly as 'horned' or 'warty' rabbits." Legends about horned rabbits also occur in Asia and Africa as well as Europe, and researchers suspect the changes induced by the virus might underlie at least some of those tales.

In Central America, mythological references to a horned rabbit creature can be found in Huichol legends. The Huichol oral tradition has passed down tales of a horned rabbit and of the deer getting horns from the rabbit. The rabbit and deer were paired, though not combined as a hybrid, as day signs in the calendar of the Mesoamerican period of the Aztecs, as twins, brothers, even the sun and moon.

=== Douglas variant ===
The New York Times attributes the American jackalope's origin to a 1932 hunting outing involving Douglas Herrick (1920–2003) of Douglas, Wyoming. Herrick and his brother had studied taxidermy by mail order as teenagers, and when the brothers returned from a hunting trip for jackrabbits, Herrick tossed a carcass into the taxidermy store, where it came to rest beside a pair of deer antlers. The accidental combination of animal forms sparked Herrick's idea for a jackalope. The first jackalope the brothers put together was sold for $10 to Roy Ball, who displayed it in Douglas' La Bonte Hotel. The mounted head was stolen in 1977. The jackalope became a popular local attraction in Douglas, where the Chamber of Commerce issues Jackalope Hunting Licenses to tourists. The tags are good for hunting during official jackalope season, which occurs for only one day: June 31 (a nonexistent date as June has 30 days), from midnight to 2 a.m. The hunter must have an IQ greater than 50 but not over 72. Thousands of "licenses" have been issued. In Herrick's home town of Douglas, there is an 8-foot (2.4 m) statue of a jackalope, and the town hosts an annual Jackalope Days Celebration in early June.

Building on the Herrick's success, Frank English of Rapid City, South Dakota has made and sold many thousands of jackalopes since retiring from the Air Force in 1981. He is the only supplier of the altered animal heads to Cabela's, a major outdoor-theme retail company. His standard jackalopes and "world-record" jackalopes sell for about $150.

In Man and Beast in American Comic Legend, folklorist Richard Dorson recounts the Douglas variant but also an alternative that will "surely infuriate the residents of Douglas...". According to Dorson, in Mythical Creatures of the North Country (1969), historian Walker D. Wyman acknowledged the existence of what he called the Alkali Area Jackalope of the western United States. However, he expressed doubt that it predated the Jack-pine Jackalope of Minnesota and Wisconsin, "a mythological throwback that defies even the most competent biologists of the region." Wyman claimed there were three known specimens of this primary jackalope—in Augusta in west-central Wisconsin; Cornucopia, along the south shore of Lake Superior; and in a north shore museum and lumber camp— all "presumably shot by careless hunters during the deer season."

In a 1978 revision and expansion of his book, which includes material on the rubberado porcupine, the snoligoster, the three-tailed bavalorus, the squonk, and many other creatures, Wyman devotes four pages to the jackalope. In a turnabout from his earlier claims of a North Country origin for the antlered hare, he says, "The center of its vast range seems to be Wyoming." Evidence of wide dispersal of Lepus antilocapra wyomingensis from its original range, he claims, are labels such as "Tioga, Pennsylvania," and "Hongkong" stamped on mounted jackalope heads in barrooms across the United States.

== Tall tales ==
The jackalope is subject to many outlandish and largely tongue-in-cheek claims embedded in tall tales about its habits. Jackalopes are said to be so dangerous that hunters are advised to wear stovepipes on their legs to keep from being gored. Stores in Douglas sell jackalope doe milk, but The New York Times questions its authenticity on grounds that milking a jackalope is known to be fraught with risk. One of the ways to catch a jackalope is to entice it with whiskey, the jackalope's beverage of choice.

The jackalope can imitate the human voice, according to legend. During the days of the Old West, when cowboys gathered by the campfires singing at night, jackalopes could be heard mimicking their voices or singing along, usually as a tenor. It is credited with being able to "throw its voice", and mimic the calls and cries of many mammals, even a chainsaw. It is said that jackalopes, the rare Lepus antilocapra, breed only during lightning flashes and that their antlers make the act difficult despite the hare's reputation for fertility. Even the ordinary jackalope only mates during lightning storms, such breeding habits accounting for their scarcity.

== Official recognition ==
In 2005, the legislature of Wyoming considered a bill to make the jackalope the state's official mythological creature. It passed the House by a 45–12 margin, but the session ended before the Senate could take up the bill, which died. In 2013, following the death of the bill's sponsor, Dave Edwards, the state legislature reintroduced the bill. It again passed the House but died in the rules committee of the Senate. In 2015, three state representatives put forth the jackalope proposal again, this time as House Bill 66, and again it passed the House but died in a Senate committee. One of the co-sponsors, Dan Zwonitzer, said, "I’ll keep bringing it back until it passes."

In 2014, the Wyoming Lottery adopted a jackalope logo for its lottery tickets and marketing materials. Lottery officials chose the fictitious animal, which they named YoLo, over the bucking horse and other state symbols.

The United States Postal Service includes a jackalope in its 2027 Mythical Creatures stamp series.

== In popular culture ==
Since Herrick and his brother began selling manipulated taxidermy heads in the 1930s, such trophies, as well as jackalope postcards and related gift-shop items, can be found in many places beyond Douglas. The student magazine of the Santa Fe University of Art and Design in New Mexico is called The Jackalope. On the other side of the world, The Hop Factory craft beer cafe in Newcastle, Australia, uses a leaping jackalope as its logo. In 1986, James Abdnor, a senator from South Dakota, gave U.S. president Ronald Reagan a stuffed jackalope (rabbit head with antlers) during a presidential campaign stop in Rapid City.

Many books, including a large number written for children, feature the jackalope. A search for "jackalope" in the WorldCat listings of early 2015 produced 225 hits, including 57 for books. Among them is Juan and the Jackalope: A Children's Book in Verse by Rudolfo Anaya. The WorldCat summary of Anaya's book says: "Competing for the hand of the lovely Rosita and her rhubarb pie, Juan rides a Jackalope in a race against Pecos Bill." A short story, "Jackalope Wives" by Ursula Vernon, has been nominated for a 2014 Nebula Award.

The psychonaut Terence McKenna claimed to have encountered a jackalope in the gardens of the Esalen Institute.

Musicians have used the jackalope in various ways. R. Carlos Nakai, a Native American flute player, formerly belonged to a group called Jackalope. In the late 1980s, it performed what Nakai called "synthacousticpunkarachiNavajazz", which combined "improvisation, visual art, storytelling, dance and dramatic theatrical effects." Nakai said he wanted people to dream as they listened to the music. Jakalope is a Canadian alternative pop/rock group formed in 2003 by Dave "Rave" Ogilvie. The band Miike Snow uses the jackalope as its logo. Band member Andrew Wyatt said during an interview in 2012 that the logo was meant to signify experiment and adventure. Of the 225 Worldcat hits resulting from a search for "jackalope", 95 were related to music.

Jackalopes have appeared in movies and on television. In the 1990s, a jackalope named "Jack Ching Bada Bing" was a recurring character in a series of sketches on the television shows America's Funniest Home Videos and America's Funniest People. The show's host, Dave Coulier, voiced the rascally hybrid. In 2003, Pixar featured a jackalope in the short animation Boundin'. The jackalope gave helpful advice to a lamb who was feeling sad after being shorn. In the Star Trek universe, the "bunnicorn" of Planet Nepenthe resembles a jackalope, and can be briefly seen in the seventh episode of Star Trek: Picard season one, released in 2020.

Jackalopes have appeared in video games. In Red Dead Redemption, the player is able to hunt and skin jackalopes. Jackalopes are part of the action in Guild Wars 2.

A low-budget jackalope mockumentary, Stagbunny, aired in Casper and Douglas in 2006. The movie included interviews with the owner of a Douglas sporting goods store who claimed to harbor a live jackalope on his premises and with a paleontologist who explained the natural history of the jackalope and its place in the fossil record.

Beginning in 1997, the Central Hockey League included a team called the Odessa Jackalopes. The team joined the South Division of the North American Hockey League before the 2011–12 season. An Odessa sports writer expressed concern about the team's name, which he found insufficiently intimidating and which sounded like "something you might eat for breakfast."

Jackalope Brewing Company, the first commercial brewery in Tennessee founded by women, opened in Nashville in 2011. Its craft beers include Thunder Ann, Sarka, Fennario, Bearwalker, and Lovebird.

The 2020 Japanese web series MILGRAM by DECO*27 and Takuya Yamanaka features a talking jackalope, simply named Jackalope, who serves as a sort of host and narrator figure parallel with the viewer insert character Es.

== Scholarly interpretations ==
Folklorist John A. Gutowski sees in the Douglas jackalope an example of an American tall tale publicized by a local community that seeks wider recognition. Through a combination of hoax and media activity, the town or other community draws attention to itself for social or economic reasons. A common adjunct to this activity involves the creation of an annual festival to perpetuate the town's association with the local legend.

Gutowski finds evidence of what he calls the "protofestival" pattern throughout the United States. In addition to the jackalope, his examples include the sea serpent of Nantucket, which in 1937 led to "stories of armadas hunting the monster, and footprint discoveries by local businessmen", accompanied by wide publicity. In similar fashion, Newport, Arkansas, publicized its White River Monster, and Algiers, Louisiana, claimed to be home to a flying Devil Man. Ware, Massachusetts, drew media attention to its local reputation for alligator sightings. Perry, New York, held Silver Lake Sea Serpent Festivals based on a local hoax. The Hodag Festival in Rhinelander, Wisconsin, celebrates "discovery" of a prehistoric creature in a nearby pit. Willow Creek, California, hosts an annual Bigfoot Festival. Since 1950, Churubusco, Indiana, has celebrated Turtle Days, based on a story, part real and part invented, about the hunt for the Beast of Busco, a 500-pound (230 kg) snapping turtle said to be living in a nearby lake.

Common to these tales, Gutowski says, is the recurring motif of the quest for the mythical animal, often a monster. The same motif, he notes, appears in American novels such as Moby Dick and Old Man and the Sea and in monster movies such as King Kong and Jaws and in world literature such as Beowulf. The monster motif also appears in tales of contemporary places outside the United States, such as Scotland, with its Loch Ness Monster. What is not global, Gutowski says, is the embrace of local monster tales by American communities that put them to use through "public relations hoaxes, boisterous boosterism, and [a] carnival atmosphere... ".

Folklorist Richard M. Dorson also cites the "booster impulse, mingled with entrepreneurial hoaxing" as the way that Douglas with its jackalope, Churubusco with its giant turtle, and other towns with their own local legends rise above anonymity. He traces the impulse and the methods to the promotional literature of colonial times that depicted North America as an earthly paradise. Much later, in the 19th century, settlers transferred that optimistic vision to the American West, where it culminated in "boosterism". Although other capitalist countries advertise their products, Dorson says, "...the intensity of the American ethos in advertising, huckstering, attention-getting, media-manipulating to sell a product, a personality, a town is beyond compare."

== See also ==
- Al-mi'raj
- Lepus cornutus
- Rasselbock
- Rogue taxidermy
- Skvader

== Bibliography ==
- Branch, Michael P. (2022). On the Trail of the Jackalope: How a Legend Captured the World's Imagination and Helped Us Cure Cancer. Simon and Schuster. ISBN 9781643139326.

== Relevant literature ==
- Branch, Michael P. On the Trail of the Jackalope: How a Legend Captured the World's Imagination and Helped Us Cure Cancer. Simon and Schuster, 2022.
