= List of named animals and plants in Germanic heroic legend =

Object or horse	Names in medieval languages	Name meaning	Role/possessor	Notes
Barnstokkr	Old Norse: Barnstokkr	"Child trunk".	A tree in Völsung's hall in the Völsunga saga.	It is noted in connection to Barnstokkr that family trees are still a living tradition in Norway and Sweden, where a centrally positioned tree is "the symbolic centre of the farm and a mimesis of the life and growth of the farm and family". See also Sacred trees and groves in Germanic paganism and mythology.
Belche	Middle High German: Belche	From PGmc *balaz-, Gothic bals ("white"), referring to the mark on the horse's forehead.	Dietleib von Steier's horse, which is from the same stud as Dietrich von Bern's horse Valke.	
Blanke	Middle High German: Blanke, Old Norse: Blanka	From OHG blanc ("white").	The horse ridden by Ilsan.	In the Þiðreks saga, the horse is a gift from Alibrandr (Hadubrand).
Boymont	Middle High German: Boymont	A form of the Norman name Bohemund.	Rüdiger von Bechalaren's horse.	
Dog king	Old Norse: Raki, Old Norse: Saurr	In Old Icelandic the name Raki means "dog" but in Danish the verb rake can mean "mistreat", "soil" or "spoil". Saurr means "dirt" and "excrement".	Chronicon lethrense tells that the Swedish king Athisl (Eadgils) subjugated the Danes and put a dog as king over them. The dog was called Raki and the king loved it so much that the one who told him of its death would die. The dog died while trying to stop a fight between two other dogs, and it was only by using a guessing game that man called Snjo could tell Athisl of its death and survive. In Gesta Danorum (VII), a Swede named Gunnar makes a dog the king of Norway. In Hákonar saga góða, a king Eysteinn and a dog named Saurr appear in a Norwegian setting where Eysteinn makes the dog Saurr the king of Trøndelag. In Skáldatál, the skald Erpr lútandi who serves the Swedish king Eysteinn Beli saves his life by composing a poem for king Sǫr, who probably is Saurr.	The tale of the dog king has counterparts outside of Scandinavia.
Geri and Freki	Old Norse: Geri og Freki	"The ravenous" or "greedy one"	Two wolves who accompanied the God Odin	Mentioned in Poetic Edda and Prose Edda
Glaum	Old Norse: Glaumr	Glaumr means "noisy merriment" from PGmc *ʒlaumaz.	The horse of Attila the Hun, in Skáldskaparmál and Atlakvíða.	Poetic Edda
Goti	Old Norse: Goti	"Goth"	In Norse tradition, Gunnar's horse.	Mentioned in the Prose Edda and the Poetic Edda.
Grani	Old Norse: Grani	The name means "the one with the upper lip".	In Norse tradition, Sigurd's horse. It is descended from Sleipnir, Odin's horse.	Mentioned in the Prose Edda and the Poetic Edda.
Habrok	Old Norse: Hábrók	The name means "hawk", a name derived from hár ("high"), and brók ("breeches").	Hrólfr kraki's hawk that he brings with him when he visits Aðils (Eadgils) in Uppsala. It kills all Aðils' hawks.	
Ho and Hopp	Old Norse: Hó ok Hoppr	Hó is an interjection and a shepherd's call, and the neuter noun hopp means "a jump".	In Hrólfs saga kraka, two dogs belonging to a hermit wizard named Vífil (one of the two meanings of the name is "pagan priest"). When the two young princes Hróarr (Hrothgar) and Helgi (Halga) hide with him, he warns them of arriving search parties by calling to them by the names of his two dogs. A seeress later reveals to their enemy that Ho and Hopp referred to the boys.	
Holkvir	Middle High German: Hǫlkvir	The name may be from PGmc *halkwiaz ("runner").	Hagen's horse in Scandinavian tradition.	
Hrafn^{1}	Old Norse: Hrafn	"raven"	King Eadgils' horse that he captured from Onela.	Mentioned in the Prose Edda.
Hrafn^{2}	Old Norse: Hrafn	See Hrafn^{1}	King Eadgils' horse he bred from Hrafn^{1}.	Mentioned in Ynglinga saga, ch. 29.
Huginn and Muninn	Old Norse: Huginn og Munin	"Thought" and "Memory"	Two ravens who bring information to the God Odin	Mentioned in Poetic Edda and Prose Edda
Leo	Latin: Leo	Leo means "lion" in Latin.	Walter of Aquitaine's horse in Waltharius.	In Rosengarten zu Worms d, Walter has a lion painted on his shield.
Lewe (Löwe)	Middle High German: Lewe	From MHG lewe ("lion").	Hildebrand's horse in Virginal.	
Melnir	Old Norse: Mélnir	The name means "bit bearer" from ON mél meaning "mouth piece".	One of the horses ridden by Hothbrodd's men mustering allies for defense against Helgi Hundingsbane.	Poetic Edda
Mylnir	Old Norse: Mýlnir	The name means "the horse with a halter" from ON múli meaning "muzzle".	One of the horses ridden by Hothbrodd's men mustering allies for defense against Helgi Hundingsbane.	Poetic Edda
Rispa	Old Norse: Rispa, Middle High German: *Rispe	From MHG rispe ("branches, brushes") or rispeln ("to curl").	Heime's horse in the Þiðreks saga.	
Rusche	Middle High German: Rusche or Röschlîn	Probably from MHG rosch, rösche ("quick, fresh, brave"), or MHG rusch ("bush").	Eckehart's horse.	
Schemming	Middle High German: Schemminc, Old Norse: Skemmingr	Probably from the same root as OHG scimo ("shine, glitter"), referring to a white horse (cf. modern German Schimmel, "white horse").	Witige's horse.	In the Rosengarten zu Worms, Dietrich exchanges Schemming for the horse Valke, while in Dietrich Flucht, he gives him the horse when Witige reaffirms his allegiance to Dietrich. In Rabenschlacht, Dietrich is unable to chase down Witige while the latter rides Schemming and Dietrich is mounted on Valke, allowing Witige to escape into the sea. In Þiðreks saga, the horse is a gift to Witige from his father Wayland, and is related to Dietrich's horse Valke, Hama's horse Rispa, and Sigurd's horse Grani. Dietrich's brother Diether kills Schemming in the Battle of Gronsport, after which Witige kills him and steals his horse.
Sibilja	Old Norse: Síbilja	In Hindu mythology, there was a cow that in addition to providing sustenance, could be unleashed against the enemy named Savala ("piebald", "variegated"), and the tradition may have been transmitted to the Germanic tribes through a Middle Iranian language, such as that of the Saka, of which the form would have corresponded closely to Sibilja. In Scandinavia, it would have been reinterpreted as the "constantly bellowing".	Sibilja was a demonic cow in Ragnars saga loðbrókar that the Swedish king Eysteinn used to sacrifice to so that her bellowing was insupportable. When the king was attacked the cow went in the front line and her bellowing made the enemy so confused that they started fighting each other. When Ragnar's sons Agnar and Eric attacked him, she also caused mayhem by goring enemy warriors with her horns. When Ivar the Boneless attacked, drowning her bellowing with the sound of weapons had no effect, nor had shooting her with arrows into her eyes, so Ivar killed her by being thrown upon her and crushing her under his weight.	There are two other cows that are killed in the saga in Hvítabœr, and these cows were probably derived from a Scandinavian tradition on dangerous and supernatural cows that are killed by heroes. Cows that become supernaturally powerful appear in other sagas. A man-eating sacrifice-bull with a terrifying bellowing appears in Hjálmþes saga ok Ǫlvis. In Olafs saga Tryggvasonar, there is a king of old who worshiped a cow and drank its milk. The primordial being Ymir was nourished by the primeval cow Auðumbla, and from the Nordic Bronze Age, there are many petroglyphs with cows in cultic contexts.
Skæfaðr	Old Norse: Skæfaðr	The name means "race horse".	Mentioned in Kálfsvísa as the horse of the prince of the Haddings (skati haddingja), i.e. Helgi Haddingjaskati.	Prose Edda
Slöngvir, Slungnir	Old Norse: Slǫngvir or Old Norse: Slungnir	"The one who slings away".	King Eadgils's horse.	Mentioned in the Prose Edda.
Sporvitnir	Old Norse: Sporvitnir	Spor means "track" and vitnir means "wolf" or "sword".	One of the horses ridden by Hothbrodd's men mustering allies for defense against Helgi Hundingsbane.	Poetic Edda
Svipud	Old Norse: Svipuðr	The name means "the fast moving".	One of the horses ridden by Hothbrodd's men mustering allies for defense against Helgi Hundingsbane.	Poetic Edda
Svegjud	Old Norse: Sveggjuðr	The name means "the one who makes the rider vibrate".	One of the horses ridden by Hothbrodd's men mustering allies for defense against Helgi Hundingsbane.	Poetic Edda
Valke	Middle High German: Valke, Old Norse: Falka	Related to MHG valke ("falcon") and val/valwe ("pale").	Dietrich von Bern's horse. The horse had also earlier belonged to Wolfdietrich.	In Rosengarten zu Worms, Dietrich exchanges Schemming for Valke. In Wolfdietrich, the horse saves Wolfdietrich's life by fighting off a dragon while Wolfdietrich is asleep. In the Þiðreks saga, the horse comes from Háma's father Studas; the horse helps Dietrich defeat Ecke by breaking the giant's back.
Val	Old Norse: Valr	The name means "the slain" or "carrion hawk".	Mentioned as Véstein's horse in Kálfsvísa at the Battle on the Ice of Lake Vänern. Its master Vésteinn appears as Weohstan in Beowulf.	Prose Edda

== Sources ==
- Byock, Jesse (1990). The Saga of the Volsungs: The Norse Epic of Sigurd the Dragon Slayer. University of California Press. ISBN 0-520-23285-2.
- Byock, Jesse (1998). The Saga of King Hrolf Kraki. Penguin Classics. ISBN 014043593X.
- Cleasby, Richard; Vigfússon, Gudbrand (1874). An Icelandic-English dictionary. Oxford Clarendon Press.
- Dutton, Douglas Robert (2015). An Encapsulation of Óðinn: Religious belief and ritual practice among the Viking Age elite with particular focus upon the practice of ritual hanging 500 -1050 AD (dissertation) (PDF). Centre for Scandinavian Studies The University of Aberdeen.
- Edda, Snorri Sturluson. Translated by Faulkes, Anthony. Everyman. 1995. ISBN 978-0460876162.
- Friis-Jensen, Karsten, ed. (2015). Saxo Grammaticus Gesta Danorum, The History of the Danes. Vol. 1. Translated by Fisher, Peter. Oxford University Press. ISBN 978-0-19-82052-34.
- Gade, Kari Ellen; Marold, Edith, eds. (2017). "Anonymous Þulur, Kálfsvísa 1". Poetry from Treatises on Poetics. Skaldic Poetry of the Scandinavian Middle Ages. Vol. 3. Turnhout: Brepols. ISBN 978-2-503-51894-7.
- Gillespie, George T. (1973). Catalogue of Persons Named in German Heroic Literature, 700-1600: Including Named Animals and Objects and Ethnic Names. Oxford: Oxford University. ISBN 978-0-19-815718-2.
- Klaeber, Friedrich (2008). Fulk, R.D.; Bjork, Robert E.; Niles, John D. (eds.). Klaeber's Beowulf and The Fight at Finnsburg. University of Toronto Press. pp. 274–277. ISBN 978-0-8020-9843-6.
- The Poetic Edda. Translated by Hollander, Lee M. Texas University Press. 1928.
- McTurk, Rory (1991). Studies in Ragnars saga Loðbrókar and its Major Scandinavian Analogues. The Society for the Study of Mediæval Languages and Literature, Oxford. ISBN 0-907570-08-9.
- Niles, John D. (2007). Niles, John D.; Osborn, Marijane (eds.). Beowulf and Lejre. ACMRS. ISBN 978-0-86698-368-6.
- Orel, Vladimir E. (2003). A Handbook of Germanic Etymology. Brill. ISBN 978-90-04-12875-0.
- Pálsson, Heimir, ed. (2012). The Uppsala Edda. Translated by Faulkes, Anthony. Viking Society for Northern Research, University College, London. ISBN 978-0-903521-85-7.
- Peterson, Lena (2007). Nordiskt runnamnslexikon. Uppsala: Institutet för språk och folkminnen.
- Sundkvist, Anneli (2001). Hästarnas land, Aristokratisk hästhållning och ridkonst i Svealands yngre järnålder. Institutionen för Arkeologi och Antik Historia, Uppsala Universitet. ISBN 91-506-1471-1.
- de Vries, Jan (1962). Altnordisches Etymologisches Worterbuch (2000 ed.). Brill. ISBN 90-04-05436-7.
- The Sagas of Ragnar Lodbrok. Translated by Waggoner, Ben. Troth Publications, New Haven, Connecticut. 2009. ISBN 978-0-578-02138-6.
