= Karkadann =

Legendary creature in Persian folklore

Karkadann (from Kargadan)
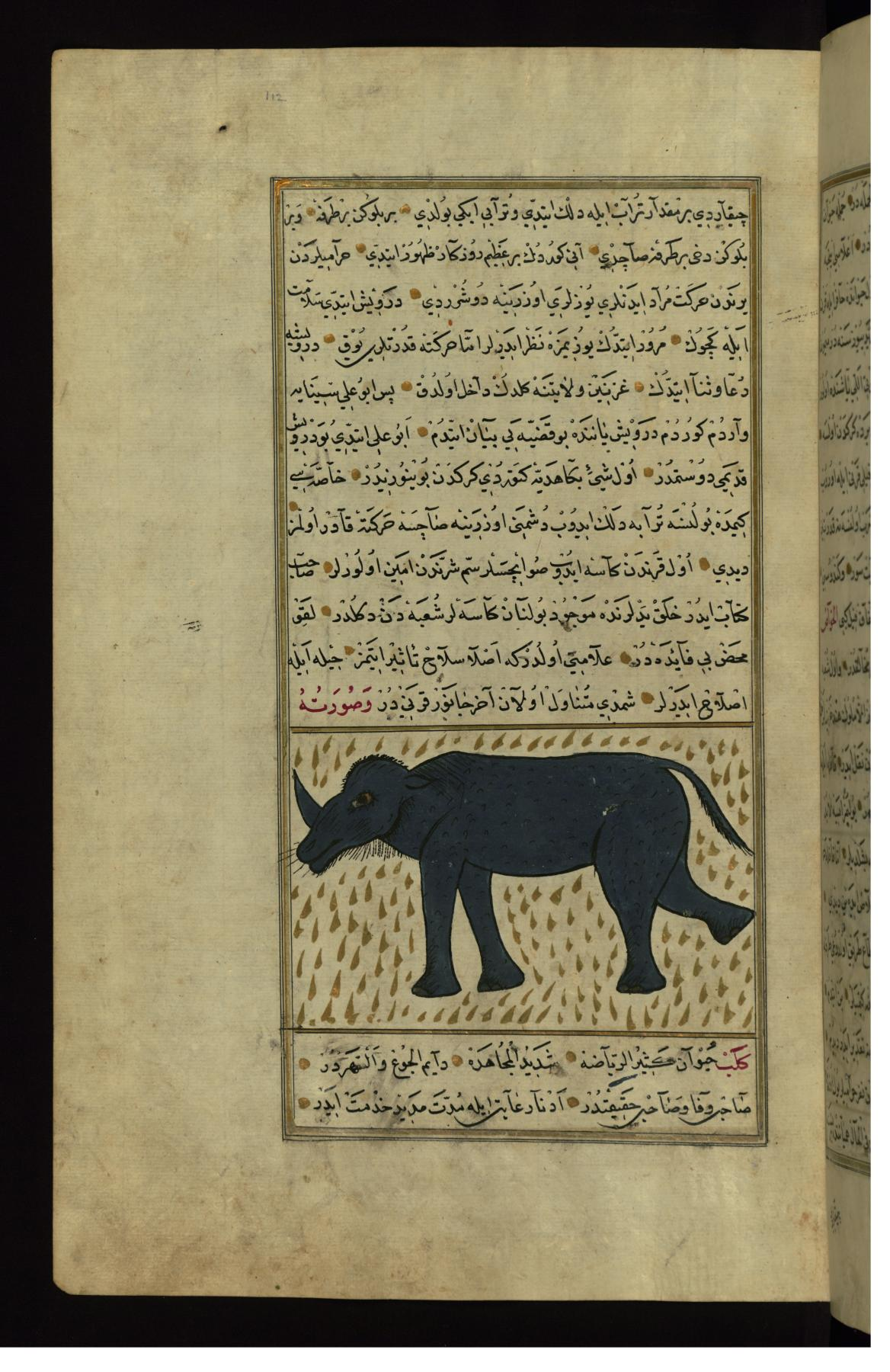
- This folio from Walters manuscript W.659 depicts a Karkadann.

Creature information
- Grouping: Legendary creature
- Similar entities: Qilin, Re'em, Indrik, Shadhavar, Camahueto, Unicorn
- Folklore: Medieval Persian tradition

Origin
- Region: India, Persia

The Karkadann (Arabic كركدن karkadann or karkaddan from Kargadan, Persian: كرگدن) is a mythical creature said to have lived on the grassy plains of India and Iran.

The word kargadan also means rhinoceros in Persian and Arabic.

Depictions of karkadann are found also in North Indian art. Like the unicorn, it can be subdued by virgins and acts ferociously toward other animals. Originally based on the Indian rhinoceros (one of the meanings of the word) and first described in the 10th/11th century, it evolved in the works of later writers into a mythical animal "with a shadowy rhinocerine ancestor" endowed with strange qualities, such as a horn with medicinal qualities.

== Evolution of descriptions ==
An early description of the karkadann comes from the 10/11th century Persian scholar Al-Biruni (973–1048). He describes an animal which has "the build of a buffalo...a black, scaly skin; a dewlap hanging down under the skin. It has three yellow hooves on each foot...The tail is not long. The eyes lie low, farther down the cheek than is the case with all other animals. On the top of the nose there is a single horn which is bent upwards." A fragment of Al-Biruni preserved in the work of another author adds a few more characteristics: "the horn is conical, bent back towards the head, and longer than a span...the animal's ears protrude on both sides like those of a donkey, and...its upper lip forms into a finger-shape, like the protrusion on the end of an elephant's trunk." These two descriptions leave no doubt that the Indian Rhinoceros is the basis for the animal. But the future confusion between the rhinoceros and the unicorn was already in the making since the Persian language uses the same word, karkadann, for the mythological animal as it does for the rhinoceros, and this confusion is evident also in the illustrations of the creature.

After Al-Biruni, Persian scholars took his description and formed ever more fanciful versions of the beast, aided by the absence of first-hand knowledge and the difficulty of reading and interpreting old Arabic script. A decisive shift in description concerned the horn: where Al-Biruni had confined his description to a short, curved horn, later writers made it a long, straight horn, which was shifted in artists' representations from the animal's nose to its brow.

The Persian physician Zakariya al-Qazwini (Al-Qazwini, d. 1283) is one of the writers who at the end of the thirteenth century links the karkadann's horn with poison, in his Aja'ib al-Makhluqat. He lists a few beneficial effects: holding the horn opens up the bowels to relieve constipation, and it can cure epilepsy and lameness. Later authors had the horn perspire when poison is present, suggesting the horn is an antidote and connecting it to alicorn, though this connection is not made by all writers.

In the 14th century, Ibn Battuta, in his travelogue, calls the rhinoceros he saw in India a karkadann, and describes it as a ferocious beast, driving away from its territory animals as big as the elephant; this is the legend that is told in One Thousand and One Nights in the "Second Voyage of Sinbad the Sailor".

The karkadann is referred to by Elmer Suhr as the "Persian version of the unicorn". The name appears also in medieval European bestiaries, such as those from Escorial and Paris, where the name karkadann appears in the captions of unicorn illustrations.

== Horn ==
Al-Qazwini, one of the earliest authors to claim the horn is an antidote to poison, also notes that it is used in the manufacturing of knife handles. According to Chris Lavers, The Natural History of Unicorns, khutu, a somewhat enigmatic material possibly consisting of ivory or bone, had been ascribed alexipharmic properties. Both of these "enigmatic horns," Lavers argues, were used in making cutlery, and so became associated; this is how in the 13th century Al-Qazwini could consider karkadann horn as an antidote, and this is how the karkadann became associated with the unicorn.

== Name ==
The name karkadann is a variation of the Kurdish name which means donkey with one horn [Kar kit Dan]. Persian kargadan, or Sanskrit kartajan, which is said to mean "lord of the desert". Fritz Hommel suspects that the word entered Semitic languages via Arabs from Abyssinia. Other spellings and pronunciations include karkaddan, kardunn, karkadan, and karkend.

It has been conjectured that the mythical karkadann may have an origin in an account from the Mahabharata.

The initial portion of Persian kargadan resembles the Sanskrit word "khaRga" for rhinoceros also meaning sword, where "R" represents a retroflex flap sound. The rhinoceros is "sword horned".

== The karkadann in modern scholarship and culture ==
=== Scholarship on the karkadann ===
Much of the available material on the karkadann was collected by Richard Ettinghausen in his 1950 publication The Unicorn, a book highly praised and often referred to as a standard reference on the unicorn.

=== Notable appearances and references ===
The karkadann is the topic of a long poem by Tawfiq Sayigh (d. 1971), "A Few Questions I Pose to the Unicorn," which was hailed by Jabra Ibrahim Jabra as "the strangest and most remarkable poem in the Arabic language."

Modern Iraq still has a tradition of "tears of the karkadann," dumiu al-karkadan, which are reddish beads used in the Misbaha, the Muslim prayer beads (subuhat). The accompanying legend says that the rhinoceros spends days in the desert looking for water; when he does, he first weeps "out of fatigue and thirst-pain." These tears, as they fall into the water of the drinking hole, turn into beads.

Peter Beagle (author of The Last Unicorn) wrote a story, "My Son Heydari and the Karkadann," in The Overneath (c)2017.
