= Ivan (disambiguation) =

Ivan is a Slavic male given name.

Ivan may also refer to:

== Arts and entertainment ==
- Ivan (1932 film), a Soviet drama film
- Ivan (2002 film), a Tamil-language film
- Ivan (2017 film), a Slovenian drama film
- Ivan, Son of the White Devil, also known as Ivan, a 1953 Italian adventure film
- Ivan (short story), by Vladimir Bogomolov, basis of the film Ivan's Childhood
- "Ivan" (The Blacklist), an episode of the TV series
- Ivan (Cars), a fictional character in the films
- Ivan (Golden Sun), a fictional character in the game series
- Ivan (musician), one-time name used by musician Jerry Allison, under which he recorded "Real Wild Child"

== Places ==
- Ivan, Ontario, Canada
- Ivaň (Brno-Country District), Czech Republic
- Ivaň (Prostějov District), Czech Republic
- Iván, Hungary
- Ivan, Russia
- Ivan, Arkansas, U.S.
- Ivan, West Virginia, U.S.
- Ivan planina, or Ivan Mountain, in Bosnia and Herzegovina
- Ivan River, Romania

== Other uses ==
- Victor Ivan (1949–2025), Sri Lankan journalist
- Ivan (crater), on the Moon
- Ivan (gorilla) (1962–2012), a zoo animal
- Ivan, codename of Tsar Bomba, the Soviet RDS-202 hydrogen bomb
- Ivan, or iwan, a rectangular hall or space commonly associated with Islamic architecture
- Tropical Storm Ivan, the name of a number of tropical storms

- Most notably Hurricane Ivan, a category 5 Atlantic hurricane in 2004.

- Ivan (model), Japanese fashion model

== See also ==
- Ivan Ivanovich (disambiguation)
- Ivaň (disambiguation)
- Ivana (disambiguation)
- Iwan (disambiguation)
