= Ivaň =

Ivaň may refer to places in the Czech Republic:

- Ivaň (Brno-Country District), a municipality and village in South Moravian Region
- Ivaň (Prostějov District), a municipality and village in Olomouc Region

== See also ==
- Ivan (disambiguation)
