= Mythological Menagerie =

- Story code: AR 104
- Story: Don Rosa
- Ink: Don Rosa
- Hero: Huey, Dewey and Louie
- Pages: 10
- Layout: 4 rows per page
- Appearances: Donald Duck; Huey, Dewey and Louie; Grandma Duck
- First publication: July 7, 1987

"Mythological Menagerie" is a Donald Duck comic by Don Rosa, first published in Walt Disney's Comics and Stories #523 in October 1987. This was the first story by Don Rosa story to be published in Finland, in 1990.

== Plot ==
Donald's nephews are practicing their animal identification skills for a field trip with the Junior Woodchucks. This gives Donald an idea: he wants to see his nephews meet an animal they can't identify, so he can claim to have been a better scout.

On a trip into the woods, Donald heads to Grandma Duck's farm, disguises various animals as fantastical creatures from his own, wild imagination, and sends them off to meet the boys. However, the boys are able to identify each of them as mythological animals:

- A Gulon;
- A Mi'raj;
- A Basilisk;
- A Catoblepas;
- A Peryton;
- A Shadhahvar;
- An Eale; and
- A Barometz.

Frustrated, Donald becomes obsessed with showing up his nephews, so he runs to Grandma's farm and begins disguising her horse. However, he has mistaken Grandma's new, more sanguine horse for her older, calmer one, and when the horse kicks Donald out of annoyance, everything goes out of control. The boys expect to see perhaps a griffin or a chimera, but what they do see is a complete jumble of animal parts. Having to admit that they have finally seen an animal they can't identify, the boys end their trip and head back home. The story ends with Donald claiming he can show his nephews something they certainly can't identify: "a genuine rustled-feathered, broken-jacketed Duckburgian pea-brain."

== Notes ==
According to Don Rosa, every single creature the boys identify the animals as really exists in some European or Asian mythology.
