= Iwana =

Iwana may refer to:

- Ivana (Slavic given name), the Polish variant of the feminine form of John (Polish: Iwan) is "Iwana"
- Salvelinus leucomaenis, a trout referred to as "iwana" (イワナ / 岩魚), locally in some regions, and an ingredient name in some cuisines
- Iguana, the lizard locally referred to as "iwana" in some places
- Iwana-bozu (岩魚坊主; Iwana-bōzu) or simply Iwana (岩魚) the legendary trout that looks like a Japanese Buddhist monk, see List of legendary creatures (I)
- Iwana Kobayashi (小林 岩魚; born 1997), Japanese footballer

== See also ==
- Iwan (disambiguation)
- Ivana (disambiguation)
