= Al-Mi'raj =

Mythical beast in medieval Arabic literature

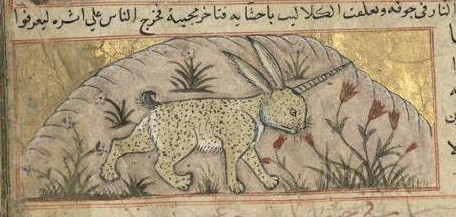
A "yellow-colored beast which resembled a rabbit with a black horn". — Bibliothèque municipale de Bordeaux, Ms 1130, fol. 54r. Dated 1565CE.

Al-Mi'raj or Almiraj (Arabic: ٱلْمِعْرَاج; al-miʿrāj) is a mythical creature resembling a one-horned hare or rabbit, mentioned in medieval Arabic literature.

The name appears in a version of the legend of Iskandar who, after defeating the dragon of Dragon Island in the Indian Ocean, obtained the animal as a gift from the inhabitants. The creature is also said to cause all animals that set sight on it to flee.

The creature also appears nameless, is given other variant names, or situated elsewhere, depending on the text or manuscript source.

== Qazwini's account ==
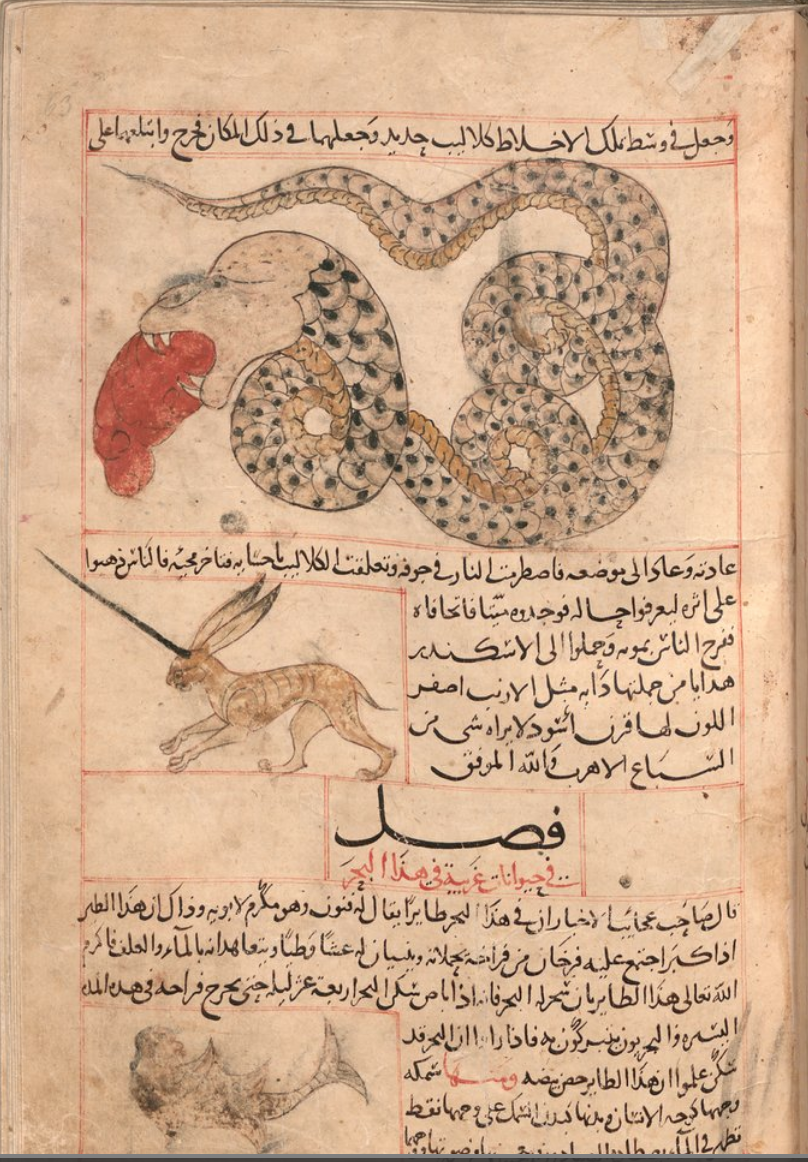
Dragon (top), eating a flesh-mass which is supposedly sulfur-filled ox-hide; the horned hare (middle). — Earliest manuscript of Qazwini's Wonders of Creation. Bayerische Staatsbibliothek (BSB) Cod. arab. 464, fol. 63; dated to c. 1279/1280 or 1377 (Note: The manuscript's completion date may be 1280 (or 1279) before the author's death, but the year 1377 is given as an alternate possibility.)

Al-miʿrāj (Note: Transliterated as elmiʿrâg′ by Ethé, who remarks in his notes that Samuel Bochart had noticed the miʿrâg in Hierozoïcon (1663); Bochart transliterates as "mirag", and explains that it is a yellow creature resembling a hare (Latin:lepus), with a black horn. "Mu'rāš" (Muʿrāsh)[?] is the name in the version discussed by Daunicht in his study of Khwārizmī's geography.) is a beast purported to live on an island called Jazīrat al-Tinnīn ('Sea-Serpent Island' or 'Dragon Island') in the Indian Ocean, according to Qazwini's Marvels of Things Created and Miraculous Aspects of Things Existing (c. 1260, aka The Wonders of Creation).

This beast is said to resemble a yellow hare (or rabbit) with a single black horn. All the wild beasts fled at the sight of it (which is a trait also shared by the karkadann, another unicorn of Arabic literature). The islanders made a gift of it to Iskandar (Alexander the Great) after he helped kill a dragon (or large serpent) which had been eating livestock.

=== Manuscripts ===
The hare has been drawn rather faithfully according to text e.g. in the Sarre manuscript (the relevant folio is now in the possession of Freer Gallery of Art), captioned "Dragon of Dragon Island and the Miraculous Hare"). (Note: Ettinghausen discusses the miniature drawing on the Sarre manuscript, and prints a black and white photographic reproduction of the horned hare on Plate 44, bottom. The same hare (and dragon) is reproduced in color by Bilha Moor(2012), Fig. 1/Plate 23, attributed to the Washington D. C., Freer Gallery of Art FGA 54, fol. 61r, since the Sarre manuscript has been sold off in pieces, and its ownership is now shared by Freer Gallery of Art (Shelfmark 54.33–54.114, and 57.13) and New York Public Library's Spencer Collection (Ms. 45). Badiee discusses the iconography of the dragon (with the twisted heart-shaped not), but not the hare on the same page.)

The creature however is depicted rather like a "hybrid animal that looks more like a fierce hound" in the Berlin copy (Staatliche Museen, Islamische Abteilung, now Museum of Islamic Art, Berlin).

The Sarre manuscript and other copies of Qazwini's cosmography fail to mention any name for the horned hare. (Note: Bilha Moor gives a paraphrased synopsis, with no name for the hare, based on the aforementioned Sarre manuscript (Freer Gallery manuscript) and an additional manuscript: St. Petersburg, The Institute of Oriental Manuscripts (Ms. D370, fol. 64r, dated to 1580CE/988AH).) Michel Wiedemann, who provides a French translation that mentions no name for the hare, is of the opinion that the name didn't occur in the original text but was added by later copyists.

The oldest copy of Qazwini is the Munich manuscript, Bayerische Staatsbibliothek (BSB) Cod. Arab. 464, which carries a miniature painting of the dragon and the horned hare on folio 63 (pictured right). The dragon is depicted "devouring sulfur-filled bulls, which look like a red piece of meat".

== Idrisi's account ==
The horned hare is called ʿarāj (Note: Transliterated a'radj in Jaubert's 19th century French translation.) (Arabic: عرَاج), and the dragon-inhabited isle is called Mustashiayn (French: Mostachiin; Arabic: مستشيين) situated in Western Africa in a recension of Idrisi's Nuzhat al-Mushtaq ("The Book of Pleasant Journeys into Faraway Lands", c. 1154),. Iskandar, here also called Dhu'l-Qarnayn "The Two-Horned", vanquishes the dragon by the same means as in Qazwini's tale, namely, stuffing the two sacrificial oxen with active substances, (Note: Here, the mixture of substances is translated by Jaubert as "oil, sulfur, lime, and arsenic".) where the outcome was that the bait "ignites fire inside the [monster's] entrails, and it expires".

In a modern edition of Idrisi, the name of horned hare is given as baqrāj (Note: Transliterated bagrāğ in Hadj Sadok's French translation.) (Arabic: بقراج), but the account differs as to circumstances: it states that Iskandar had harvested aloeswood on Lāqā, which failed to give off fragrance at first, but turned into fine-scented dense black wood upon departure from the island, and he traded the best specimen with other goods, including the baqrāj which looked like a hare but had a coat of shiny gold and a single black horn; it also caused wild animals (whether predator, mammal, or birds) to flee.

== Ibn al-Wardi's treatise ==
The name of the wondrous beast was copied as al-Maharāǧ (al-Maharāj, Arabic: المهرَاج, sic.) in Ibn al-Wardī's Margarita mirabilum or Pearl of Wonders, circa 1450. (Note: Transliterated El-Mua'râdj in the fragmentary Latin translation.)

== Miscellaneous ==
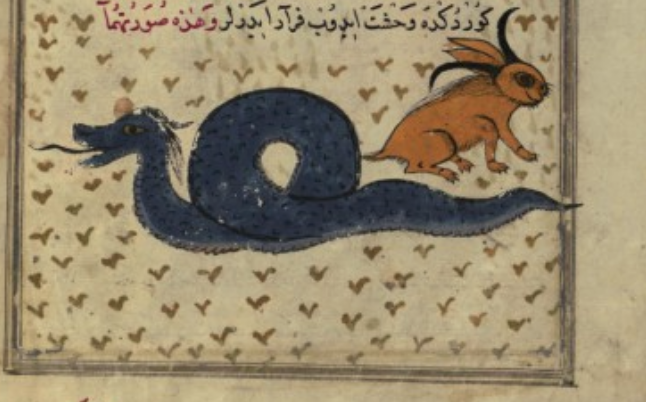
"Dragon of Tannin Island and Horned Rabbit" — Turkish Translation of the Wonders of Creation. (Note: Tercüme-yi ʿAcāʾib ül-maḫlūḳāt ترجمه عجائب المخلوقات.) Baltimore, MD., Walters Art Museum W.659, fol. 155B. Dated 1717CE.

There is a Turkish translation of Qazwini on illuminated manuscript (18th century, Walters Art Museum), (Note: The current database dates it precisely to "12 Ramaḍān 1121 AH / 1717 CE", though Ettinghausen gives the date 1709/AH 1121, for the Walters Gallery copy.) and the episode of the dragon's isle and the horned hare is illustrated on one of its leaves (Fig. right).

Also, the Ottoman historian Ibn Zunbul's Qanun al-Dunya ("Law of the World"), preserved in manuscript (Topkapi Sarayi Museum Library ms. R 1638, fol. 15v), depicts the dragon and the golden one-horned hare.

== Dragon-slaying variations ==
Legend holds that Iskandar carried out his serpent/dragon-slaying using decoy oxen consisting of oxen-hide loaded with lethal material.

In Qazwini's cosmology, the reactive ingredients consisted of coniferous resin/turpentine (Note: "Fichtenharz", as given by Ethé, is literally "spruce resin", but this is a general term for coniferous resins.) (or pitch or tar (Note: Wiedemann gives French goudron or tar.)), sulfur, quicklime, (Note: Ethé's German Kalk is somewhat vague, but Wiedemann's French chaux vive is "quicklime".) arsenic, and iron hooks, or just sulfur and iron hooks, depending on the recension.

=== Persian version ===
As for treatments in languages other than Arabic, it is pointed out that the dragon-slaying Iskandar of Qazwini can be identified with one of the shahs of the Persian epic Shahnāma, or "The Book of Kings".

In the Shahnāma version, Iskandar/Sekandar/Sikandar employs five oxen filled with poison and oil ("bane and naphtha") (Note: Although modern Arabic or Persian nefth (nifth, nafth; نفت) denotes "crude oil", "naphtha" of antiquity was a "highly flammable light fraction of petroleum".) which are inflated, in order to defeat his dragon.

=== Old Syriac version ===
The immediate source of this legend circulating in the Islamic world seems to be the 7th century Syriac version of the Alexander Romance (pseudo-Callisthenes). Here, Aleksandros after several days orders two large sacrificial oxen be removed of flesh, and had them stuffed with gypsum, pitch, lead, and sulfur to feed to the dragon. When it was incapacitated, heated balls of brass be cast into its mouth by Alexander's orders, upon which the monster finally died. The episode is only found in the Syriac version, but is conjectured to have been present in the hypothetical Greek original (*δ variant).

=== Turkish version ===
Later, the Ottoman Turkish poet Ahmedî (d. 1413) composed the Iskendername, using the Persian Shahnāma and Nizami's Iskandarnāma as source material. And in Ahmedî's poem, İskender uses hooks in his stratagem to destroy a dragon: namely, he attached a thousand poisoned hooks to his ox-driven chariot, and having administered himself with the antidote, he assaulted the dragon. The dragon consequently received fatal injuries around its mouth and on its head. Incidentally, this tactic is paralleled in the Shahnāma for a different king, Isfandiyar who used a horse-drawn chariot spiked with swords to combat a dragon.

== Pop culture references ==
Al-Mi'raj has been occasionally featured in video and role-playing games.

- Al-Mi'raj has been adapted into Dungeons & Dragons, as part of the 1st edition Advanced Dungeons and Dragons Fiend Folio.
- An enemy in the Dragon Quest series (アルミラージ ... arumirāji), first appearing in Dragon Quest III, where it is a low-level monster with a sleep attack used to render players helpless while it attacks. In U.S. localizations it has usually been renamed to "Spiked Hare", but its name is preserved in the Game Boy Color version Unlike the normal legendary Miraj, this Mi'raj is purple with a white horn and white cheeks.
- In Episode 10 of the anime Is It Wrong to Try to Pick Up Girls in a Dungeon? the first floor of the mid level contains multiple white rabbits that walk on two legs and which are identified as al-mi'raj.
- In the animated short "Red" (2010), the little wolf-boy protects Red from an al-mi'raj that can grow to a monstrous size.
- The Yu-Gi-Oh! Breakers of Shadow booster pack features a card based on this mythical creature called Al-Lumi'raj, and the Battles of Legend: Hero's Revenge pack features another called Salamangreat Almiraj.
- The game Rage of Bahamut (and subsequently the Shadowverse CCG, which is based on it) contains a character called Moon Al-Mir'aj, a humanoid rabbit with a black horn called Ramina.
- In the Donald Duck story "Mythological Menagerie", Donald tries to fool Huey, Dewey and Louie by painting a rabbit yellow and attaching a horn to it, but the nephews identify it as a Mi'Raj.
- In Brave Frontier, Al-mi'raj is a common light-element unit, depicted as a white rabbit with tufts of blue fur and a golden horn.
- In the episode 10 of I've Been Killing Slimes for 300 Years and Maxed Out My Level, a musician bunny girl appears, introduces herself as Kuku from Al-Mi'raj race.
- In the episode 8 of Re:Zero − Starting Life in Another World season 2, multiple al-mi'raj appear in a vast and snowy plain as Subaru is standing in the middle of them.
- In the series KonoSuba, multiple Al-Mir'Aj are seen as they are common monsters that are hostile to people. In the Explosions spin-off Megumin and her friend Yunyun nearly fall prey to their attack.
- In the season 3 of Industry, an Egyptian sovereign wealth fund named “Al-Miraj” took over Pierpoint & Co, a failing investment bank.

== See also ==
- Golden Fleece
- Jackalope
- Lepus cornutus
- Shadhavar
- Shope papilloma virus
- Wolpertinger
