= Unicorn =

Legendary single-horned horse-like creature

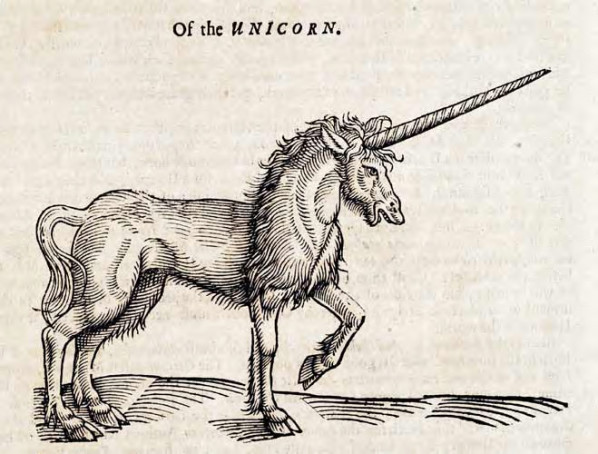
- 17th-century woodcut depiction of a unicorn

Creature information
- Other name: Monocerus
- Grouping: Mythical creature
- Similar entities: Qilin, Re'em, Indrik, Shadhavar, Camahueto, Karkadann
- Folklore: Worldwide

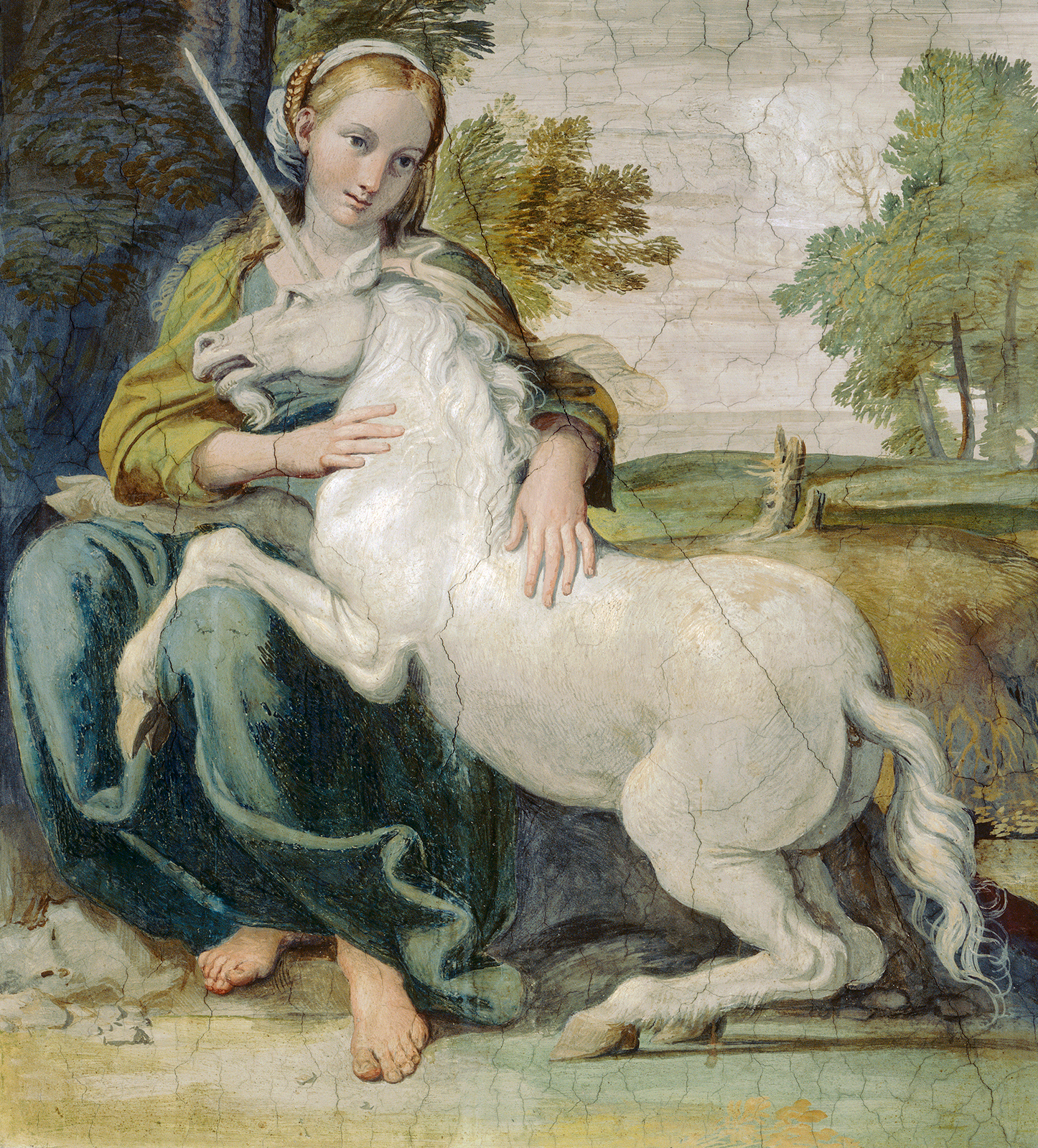
A Virgin with a Unicorn, fresco by Domenichino, c. 1604–1605 (Palazzo Farnese, Rome)

The unicorn is a legendary creature that has been described since antiquity as a beast with a single large, pointed, spiraling horn projecting from its forehead.

In European literature and art, the unicorn has, for the last thousand years or so, been depicted as a white horse- or goat-like animal with a long, straight horn with spiraling grooves, cloven hooves, and sometimes a goat's beard. In the Middle Ages and Renaissance, it was commonly described as an extremely wild woodland creature, a symbol of purity and grace, which could be captured only by a virgin. In encyclopedias, its horn was described as having the power to render poisoned water potable and to heal sickness. In medieval and Renaissance times, the tusk of the narwhal was sometimes sold as a unicorn horn.

A bovine type unicorn is thought by some scholars to have been depicted on seals of the Bronze Age Indus Valley civilization—an interpretation that remains controversial. An equine form of the unicorn was mentioned by the ancient Greeks in accounts of natural history by various writers, including Ctesias, Strabo, Pliny the Younger, Aelian, and Cosmas Indicopleustes. Some versions of re'em, a word appearing in the Hebrew Bible (in, e.g., Psalm 92:11 and Deuteronomy 33:17), are rendered as unicorn.

The unicorn continues to hold a place in popular culture. It is often used as a symbol of fantasy or rarity. In the 21st century, it has become an LGBTQ symbol.

== History ==
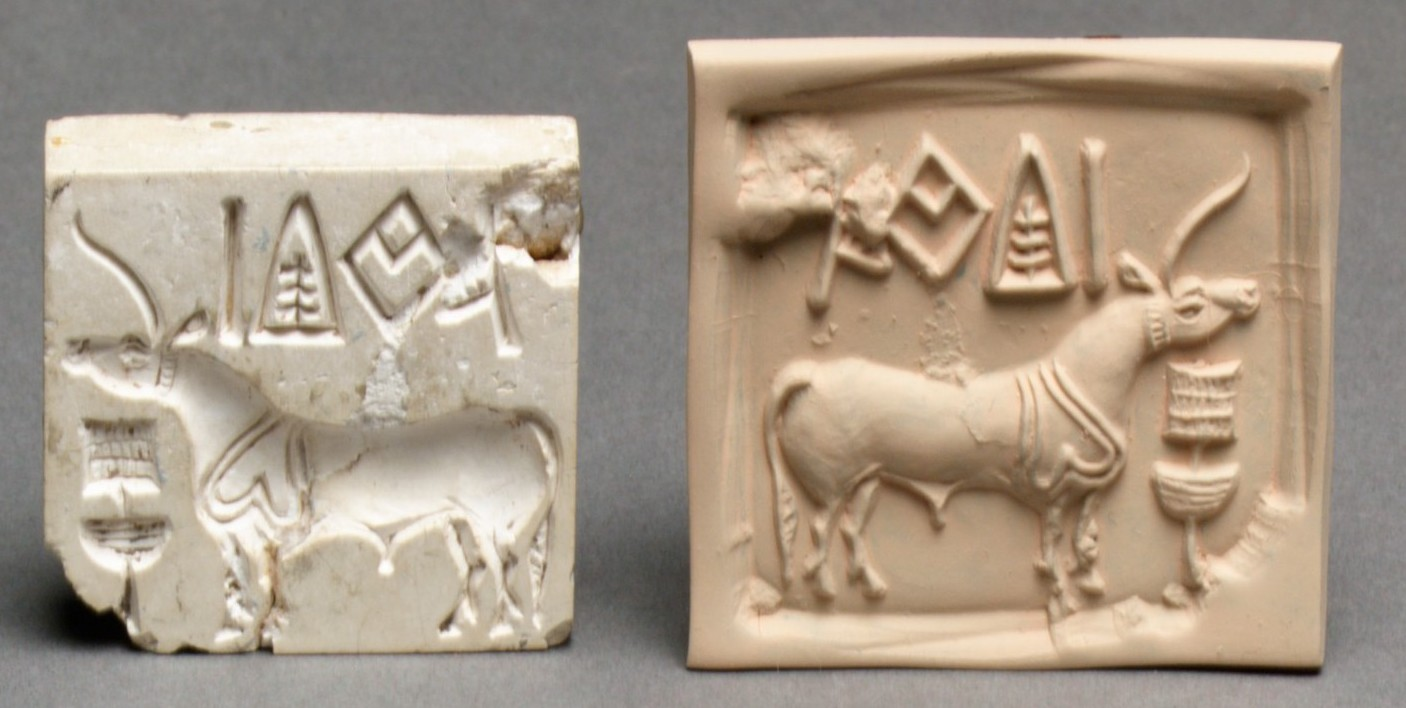
Indus stamp seal and modern impression; unicorn and incense burner or manger, 2600–1900 BC

=== Indus Valley civilization ===
A creature with a single horn, conventionally called a unicorn, is the most common image on the soapstone stamp seals of the Bronze Age Indus Valley civilization, from the centuries around 2000 BC. It has a body more like a cow than a horse, and a curved horn that goes forward, then up at the tip. The mysterious feature depicted coming down from the front of the back is usually shown; it may represent a harness or other covering. Typically, the unicorn faces a vertical object with at least two stages; this is variously described as a "ritual offering stand", an incense burner, or a manger. The animal is always in profile on Indus seals, but the theory that it represents animals with two horns, one hiding the other, is disproved by a (much smaller) number of small terracotta unicorns, probably toys, and the profile depictions of bulls, where both horns are clearly shown. It is thought that the unicorn was the symbol of a powerful "clan or merchant community", but may also have had some religious significance.

In South Asia, the unicorn is only seen during the Indus Valley period, and disappeared in South Asian art after this. Jonathan Mark Kenoyer stated the Indus Valley "unicorn" has no "direct connection" with later unicorn motifs observed in other parts of the world; nonetheless, it remains possible that the Indus Valley unicorn had contributed to later myths of fantastical one-horned creatures in West Asia.

=== Classical antiquity ===
Unicorns are not found in Greek mythology, but rather in the accounts of natural history, for Greek writers of natural history were convinced of the reality of unicorns, which they believed lived in India, a distant and fabulous realm for them. The earliest description is from the 4th century BCE Persian court physician Ctesias, who in his book Indika ("On India") described them as wild asses, fleet of foot, having a horn a cubit and a half (700 mm, 28 inches) in length, and colored white, red and black. They were also described as being fierce and impossible to capture alive, defeated only after being surrounded while it attempts to protect its young. Unicorn meat was said to be too bitter to eat.

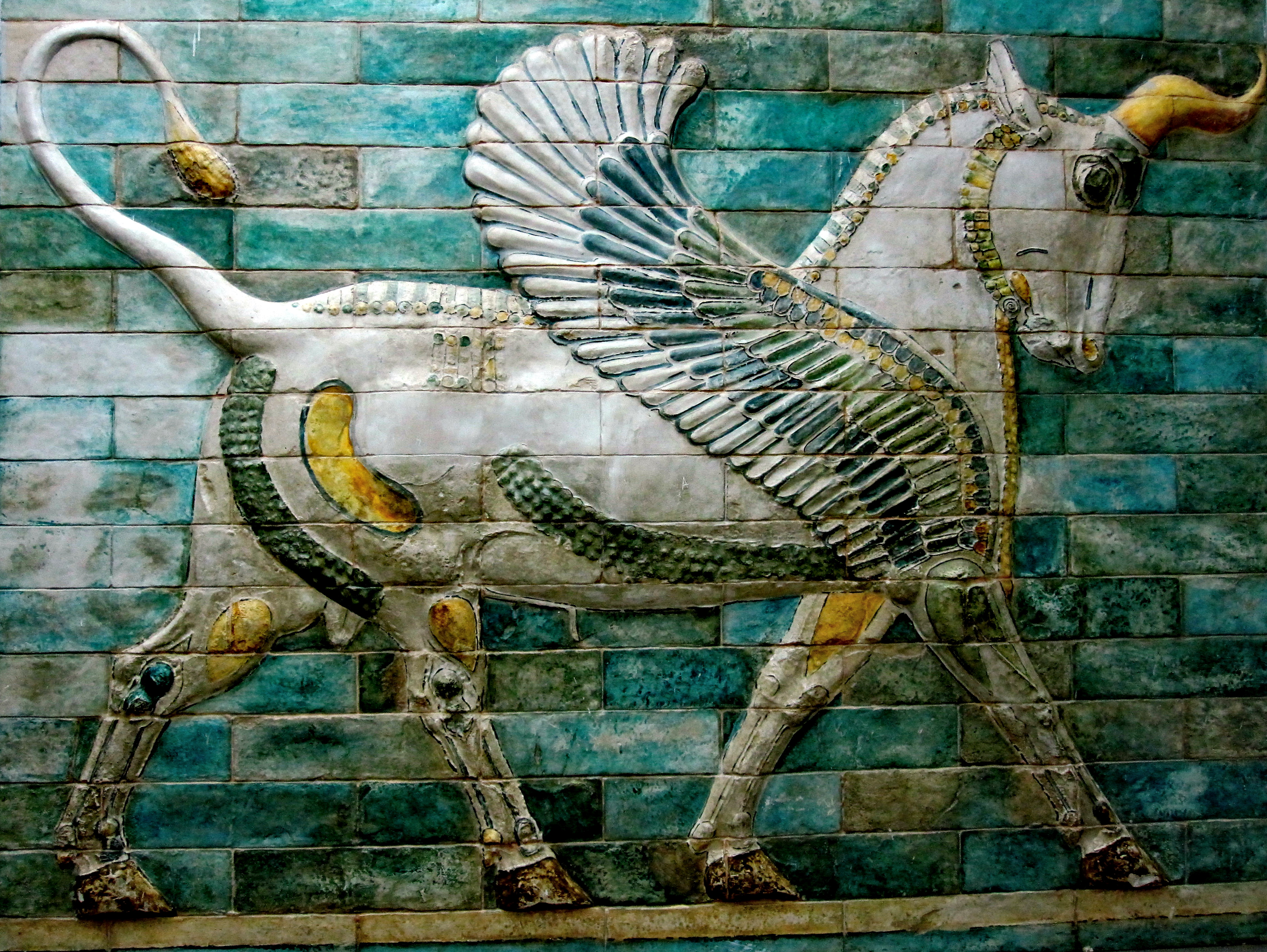
Winged bull, perhaps perceived as a unicorn, in the Palace of Darius in Susa, Iran

Ctesias got his information while living in Persia. Unicorns or, more likely, winged bulls, appear in reliefs at the ancient Persian capital of Persepolis in Iran. Aristotle must be following Ctesias when he mentions two one-horned animals, the oryx (a kind of antelope) and the so-called "Indian ass" (ἰνδικὸς ὄνος). Antigonus of Carystus also wrote about the one-horned "Indian ass". Megasthenes, the Greek traveler of 300 BCE, described the Cartazon, a beast with a loud bellow and a horn with spiral markings, it is thought that the descriptions of Aelian, Strabo and Pliny the elder were based on this account. Strabo says that in the Caucasus there were one-horned horses with stag-like heads. Pliny the Elder mentions the oryx and an Indian ox (perhaps a greater one-horned rhinoceros) as one-horned beasts, as well as "a very fierce animal called the monoceros which has the head of the stag, the feet of the elephant, and the tail of the boar, while the rest of the body is like that of the horse; it makes a deep lowing noise, and has a single black horn, which projects from the middle of its forehead, two cubits [900 mm, 35 inches] in length." In On the Nature of Animals (Περὶ Ζῴων Ἰδιότητος, De natura animalium), Aelian, quoting Ctesias, adds that India produces also a one-horned horse (iii. 41; iv. 52), and says (xvi. 20) that the monoceros (μονόκερως) was sometimes called cartazonos (καρτάζωνος), which may be a form of the Arabic karkadann, meaning 'rhinoceros'.

Cosmas Indicopleustes, a 6th-century Greek traveler who journeyed to India and the Kingdom of Aksum, gives a description of a unicorn based on four bronze figures he saw in the four-towered palace of the King of Ethiopia. He states, from report:

They speak of him as a terrible beast and quite invincible and that all its strength lies in its horn. When he finds himself pursued by many hunters and on the point of being caught, he springs up to the top of some precipice whence he throws himself down and in the descent turns a somersault so that the horn sustains all the shock of the fall, and he escapes unhurt.

=== Middle Ages and Renaissance ===
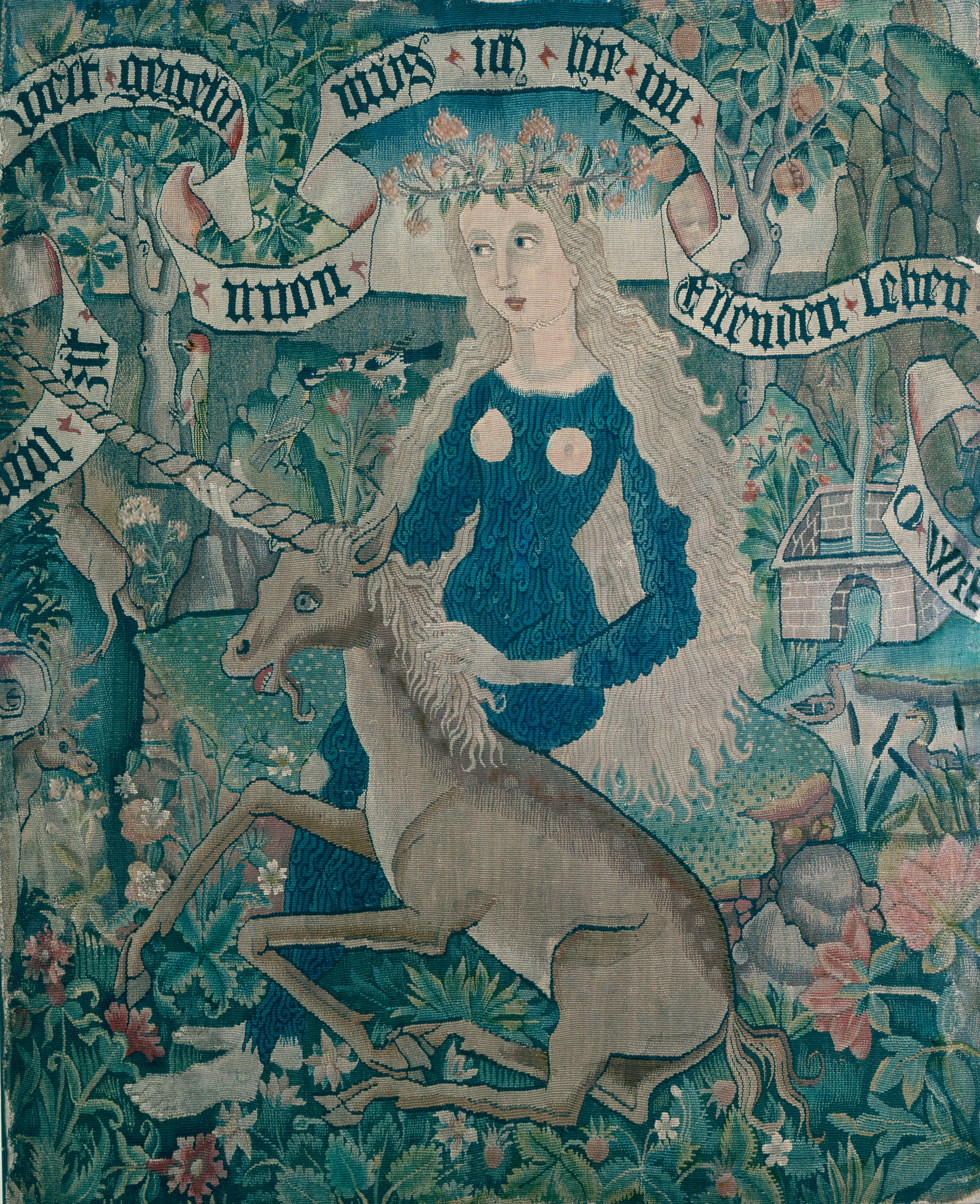
Wild woman with unicorn, tapestry, c. 1500–1510 (Basel Historical Museum)

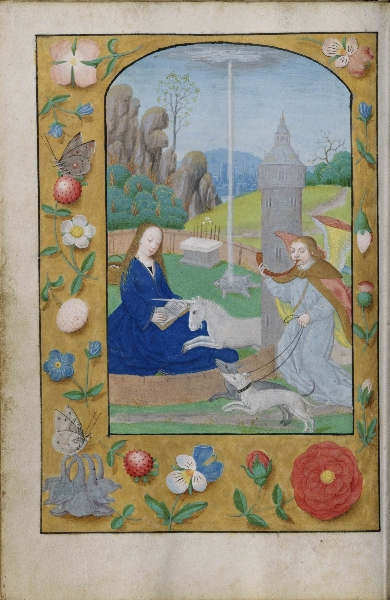
Hunt of the Unicorn Annunciation (c. 1500) from a Netherlandish Book of Hours

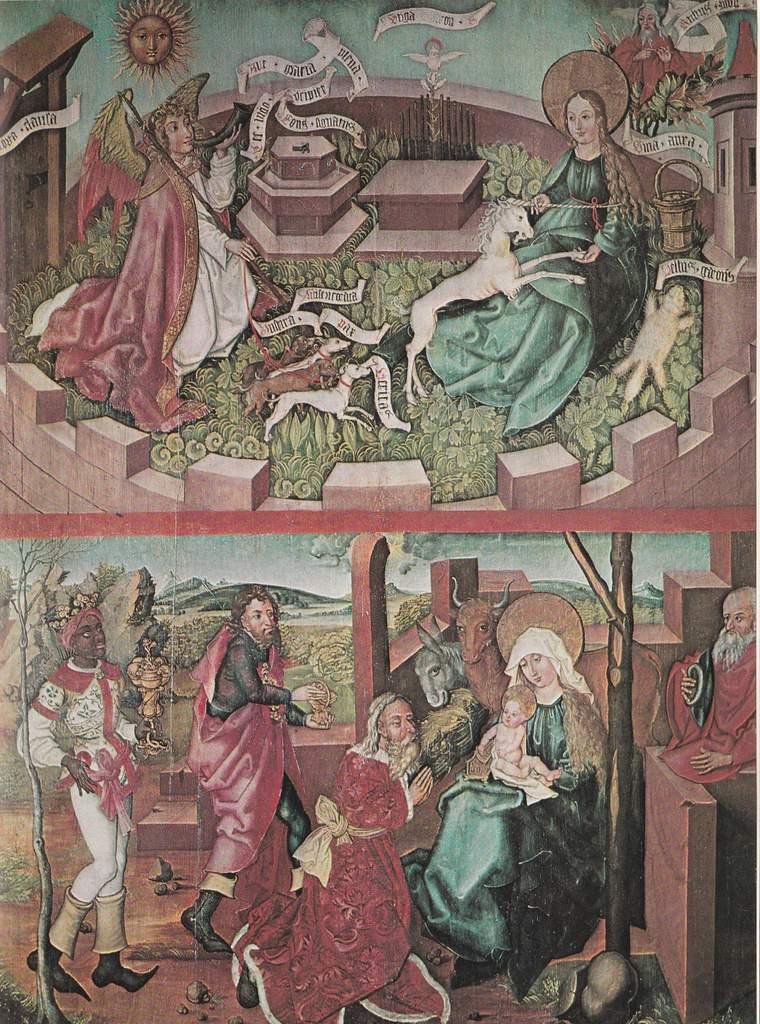
Annunciation with the Unicorn and Adoration of the Magi from the Buhl Altarpiece, c. 1495

Medieval knowledge of unicorns stemmed from biblical and ancient sources, and unicorns were variously represented as a kind of wild ass, goat, or horse.

Several European medieval travelers claimed to have seen unicorns in their travels outside of Europe. For example Felix Fabri claimed to have seen a unicorn in Sinai.

The predecessor of the medieval bestiary, compiled in Late Antiquity and known as Physiologus (Φυσιολόγος), popularized an elaborate allegory in which a unicorn, trapped by a maiden (representing the Virgin Mary), stood for the Incarnation. As soon as the unicorn sees her, it lays its head on her lap and falls asleep. This became a basic emblematic tag that underlies medieval notions of the unicorn, justifying its appearance in both secular and religious art. The unicorn is often shown hunted, raising parallels both with vulnerable virgins and sometimes the Passion of Christ. The myths refer to a beast with one horn that can only be tamed by a virgin; subsequently, some writers translated this into an allegory for Christ's relationship with the Virgin Mary.

The unicorn also figured in courtly terms: for some 13th-century French authors such as Thibaut of Champagne and Richard de Fournival, the lover is attracted to his lady as the unicorn is to the virgin. With the rise of humanism, the unicorn also acquired more orthodox secular meanings, emblematic of chaste love and faithful marriage. It plays this role in Petrarch's Triumph of Chastity, and on the reverse of Piero della Francesca's portrait of Battista Strozzi, paired with that of her husband Federico da Montefeltro (painted c. 1472–1474), Bianca's triumphal car is drawn by a pair of unicorns.

However, when the unicorn appears in the medieval legend of Barlaam and Josaphat, ultimately derived from the life of the Buddha, it represents death, as the Golden Legend explains. Unicorns in religious art largely disappeared after they were condemned by Molanus after the Council of Trent.

The unicorn, tamable only by a virgin woman, was well established in medieval lore by the time Marco Polo described them as "scarcely smaller than elephants. They have the hair of a buffalo and feet like an elephant's. They have a single large black horn in the middle of the forehead ... They have a head like a wild boar's ... They spend their time by preference wallowing in mud and slime. They are very ugly brutes to look at. They are not at all such as we describe them when we relate that they let themselves be captured by virgins, but clean contrary to our notions." It is clear that Marco Polo was describing a rhinoceros.

==== Alicorn ====
The horn of a unicorn itself was thought to be made of a substance called alicorn, and it was believed that the horn holds magical and medicinal properties. The Danish physician Ole Worm determined in 1638 that the alleged alicorns were the tusks of narwhals. Such beliefs were examined wittily and at length in 1646 by Sir Thomas Browne in his Pseudodoxia Epidemica.

False alicorn powder, made from the tusks of narwhals or horns of various animals, was sold in Europe for medicinal purposes as late as 1741. The alicorn was thought to cure many diseases and have the ability to detect poisons, and many physicians would make "cures" and sell them. Cups were made from alicorn for kings and given as a gift; these were usually made of ivory from elephant or walrus. Entire horns were very precious in the Middle Ages and were often really the tusks of narwhals.

== Entrapment ==
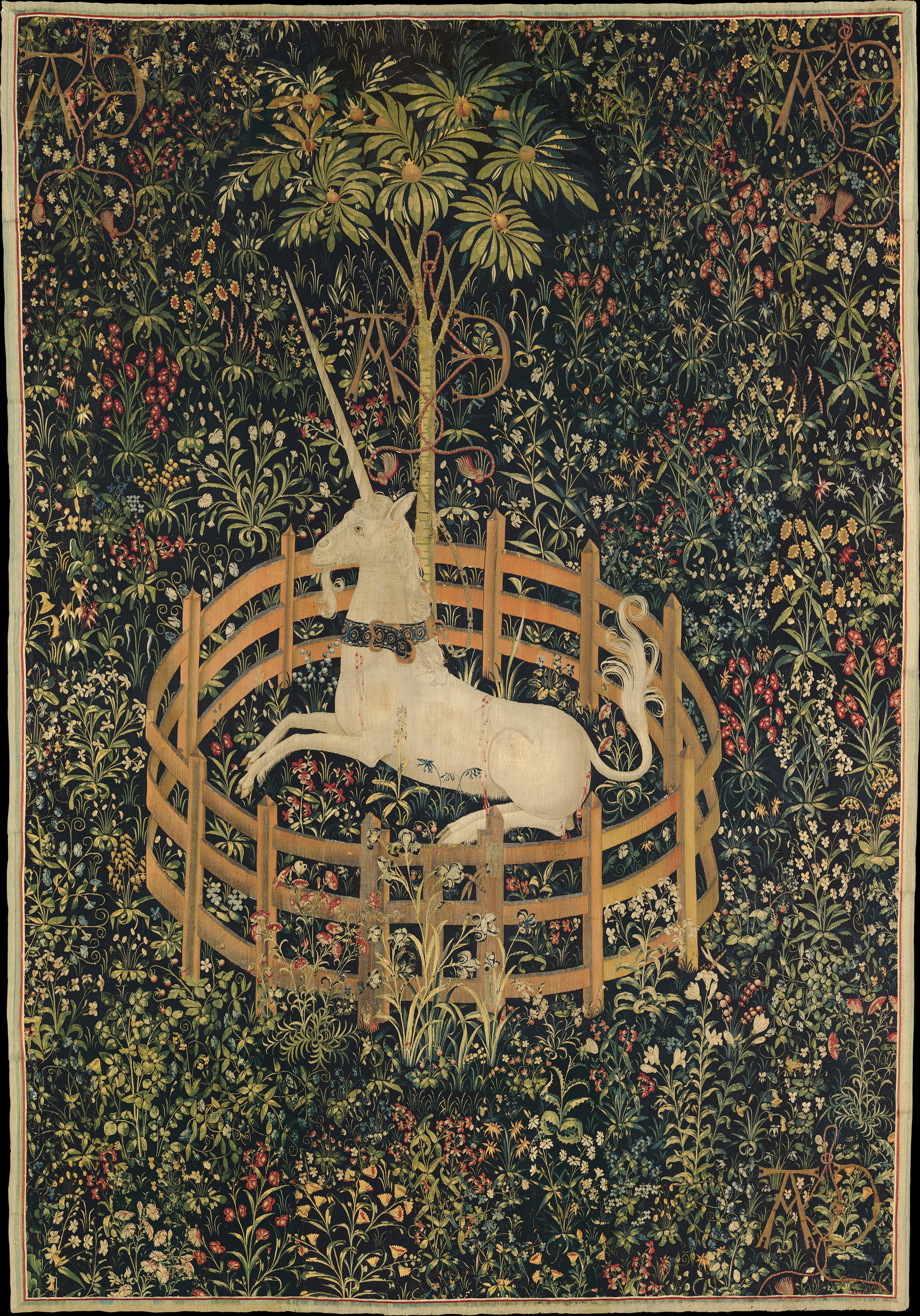
The Unicorn in Captivity, one of The Hunt of the Unicorn tapestries, c. 1495–1505, The Cloisters

Sight, from the La Dame à la licorne tapestry set, c. 1500 (Musée de Cluny, Paris)

One traditional method of hunting unicorns involved entrapment by a virgin. In one of his notebooks Leonardo da Vinci wrote:

The unicorn, through its intemperance and not knowing how to control itself, for the love it bears to fair maidens forgets its ferocity and wildness; and laying aside all fear it will go up to a seated damsel and go to sleep in her lap, and thus the hunters take it.

The famous late Gothic series of seven tapestry hangings The Hunt of the Unicorn are a high point in European tapestry manufacture, combining both secular and religious themes. The tapestries now hang in the Cloisters division of the Metropolitan Museum of Art in New York City. In the series, richly dressed noblemen, accompanied by huntsmen and hounds, pursue a unicorn against mille-fleur backgrounds or settings of buildings and gardens. They bring the animal to bay with the help of a maiden who traps it with her charms, appear to kill it, and bring it back to a castle; in the last and most famous panel, "The Unicorn in Captivity", the unicorn is shown alive again and happy, chained to a pomegranate tree surrounded by a fence, in a field of flowers. Scholars conjecture that the red stains on its flanks are not blood but rather the juice from pomegranates, which were a symbol of fertility. However, the true meaning of the mysterious resurrected unicorn in the last panel is unclear. The series was woven about 1500 in the Low Countries, probably Brussels or Liège, for an unknown patron. A set of six engravings on the same theme, treated rather differently, were engraved by the French artist Jean Duvet in the 1540s.

Another famous set of six tapestries of Dame à la licorne ("Lady with the unicorn") in the Musée de Cluny, Paris, were also woven in the Southern Netherlands before 1500, and show the five senses (the gateways to temptation) and finally Love ("A mon seul desir" the legend reads), with unicorns featured in each piece. Facsimiles of these unicorn tapestries were woven for permanent display in Stirling Castle, Scotland, to take the place of a set recorded in the castle in a 16th-century inventory.

A rather rare, late-15th-century, variant depiction of the hortus conclusus in religious art combined the Annunciation to Mary with the themes of the Hunt of the Unicorn and Virgin and Unicorn, so popular in secular art. The unicorn already functioned as a symbol of the Incarnation and whether this meaning is intended in many prima facie secular depictions can be a difficult matter of scholarly interpretation. There is no such ambiguity in the scenes where the archangel Gabriel is shown blowing a horn, as hounds chase the unicorn into the Virgin's arms, and a little Christ Child descends on rays of light from God the Father. The Council of Trent finally banned this somewhat over-elaborated, if charming, depiction, partly on the grounds of realism, as no one now believed the unicorn to be a real animal.

Shakespeare scholars describe unicorns being captured by a hunter standing in front of a tree, the unicorn goaded into charging; the hunter would step aside the last moment and the unicorn would embed its horn deeply into the tree (See annotations of Timon of Athens, Act 4, scene 3, c. line 341: "wert thou the unicorn, pride and wrath would confound thee and make thine own self the conquest of thy fury".)

== Heraldry ==
In heraldry, a unicorn is often depicted as a horse with a goat's cloven hooves and beard, a lion's tail, and a slender, spiral horn on its forehead (non-equine attributes may be replaced with equine ones). Whether because it was an emblem of the Incarnation or of the fearsome animal passions of raw nature, the unicorn was not widely used in early heraldry, but became popular from the 15th century. Though sometimes shown collared and chained, which may be taken as an indication that it has been tamed or tempered, it is more usually shown collared with a broken chain attached, showing that it has broken free from its bondage.

=== Scotland ===
In heraldry the unicorn is best known as a symbol of Scotland: the unicorn was believed to be the natural enemy of the lion – a symbol that the English royals had adopted around a hundred years before. Two unicorns supported the royal arms of the King of Scots and Duke of Rothesay, and since the 1707 union of England and Scotland, the royal arms of the United Kingdom have been supported by a unicorn along with an English lion. Two versions of the royal arms exist: that used in Scotland gives more emphasis to the Scottish elements, placing the unicorn on the left and giving it a crown, whereas the version used in England and elsewhere gives the English elements more prominence. John Guillim, in his book; A Display of Heraldry, has illustrated the unicorn as a symbol of power, honor and respect.

Golden coins known as the unicorn and half-unicorn, both with a unicorn on the obverse, were used in Scotland in the 15th and 16th centuries. In the same realm, carved unicorns were often used as finials on the pillars of Mercat crosses, and denoted that the settlement was a royal burgh. Certain noblemen such as the Earl of Kinnoull were given special permission to use the unicorn in their arms, as an augmentation of honour. The crest for Clan Cunningham bears a unicorn head.

== Modern culture ==
In the late 20th and early 21st centuries, unicorns experienced a notable resurgence in popular culture, appearing prominently in children’s toys, clothing, stationery, and digital media. The creature became a recurring motif in books and animated series, most notably in the animated TV series My Little Pony: Friendship Is Magic and Unicorn Academy. This period also saw a rise in references to unicorns in English-language books, as shown in Google Ngram data.

The popularity of unicorn imagery also extends to food, fashion, and online aesthetics among adults, contributing to the broader "unicorn trend" characterized by rainbow-colored palettes, sparkles, and stylized fantasy motifs.

Toymakers have produced toy designs featuring other animals, including cats, that are given a unicorn-style horn, as well as unicorn-themed accessories, such as headbands with a single horn for children and adults. Unicorn-themed birthday parties also emerged as a popular trend.

=== Queer culture ===
A toy unicorn, about which its creators have written, "Meet Glimmer, the Pride unicorn." Note that its hair is colored like the rainbow flag.

By the beginning of the 21st century, unicorns became a queer symbol.

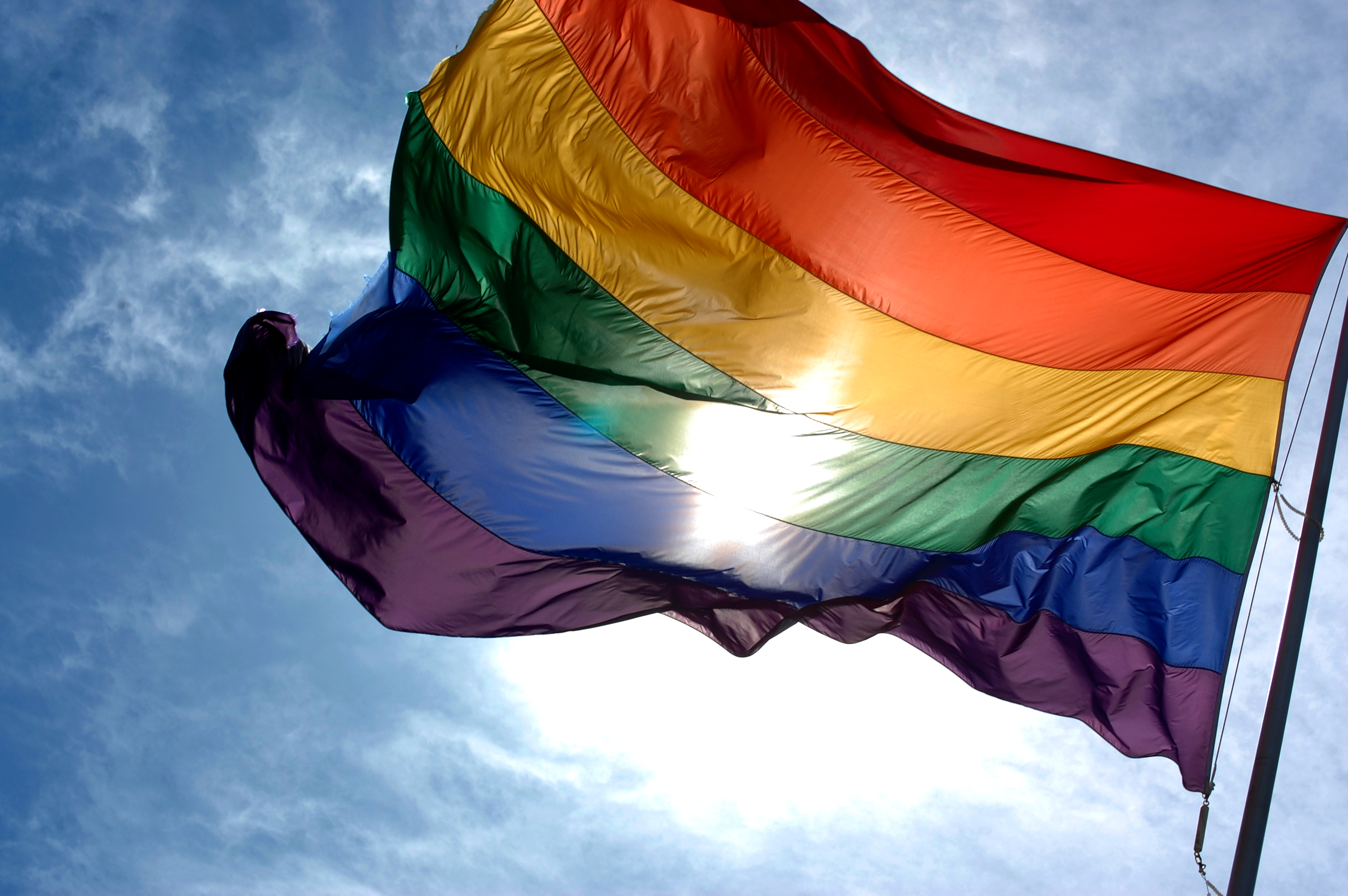
A rainbow flag flying

The rainbow flag, created by American artist Gilbert Baker in 1978 as a symbol of the diversity of the queer community, became prominent during the gay rights protests of the 1970s and 1980s. Unicorns, which were linked to rainbows since the Victorian era, would become a symbol of the queer community.

There is no consensus on how the unicorn became a queer symbol.

When directly asked, queer people give different answers about if they have close personal relationships with unicorns.

Queer individuals tend to relate to the unicorn because of their unique sexual orientation and gender identity. The unicorn is an imaginary animal that lives in a world of myths and legends. Queer people, who often blur the lines between societal norms of masculinity and femininity, may feel that they do not fully belong in this world, and this could have influenced the adoption of the unicorn as an LGBTQ smybol.

Some argue that the gender fluidity of the unicorn makes it a suitable representation of the LGBTQ community. In ancient myths, the unicorn was usually portrayed as male, whereas in the modern times, it is typically depicted as a female creature.

== Similar animals in religion and myth ==
=== Biblical ===
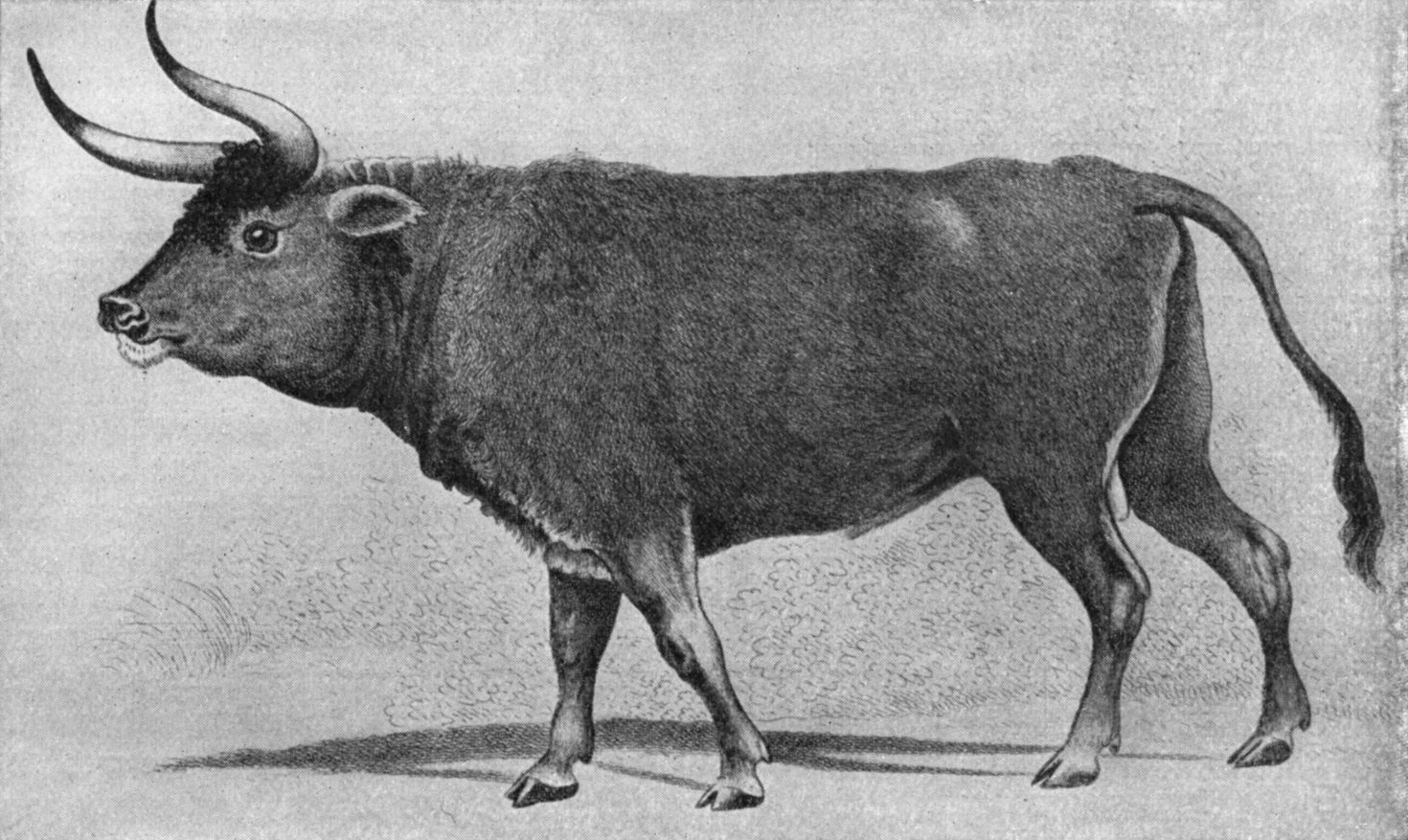
The aurochs

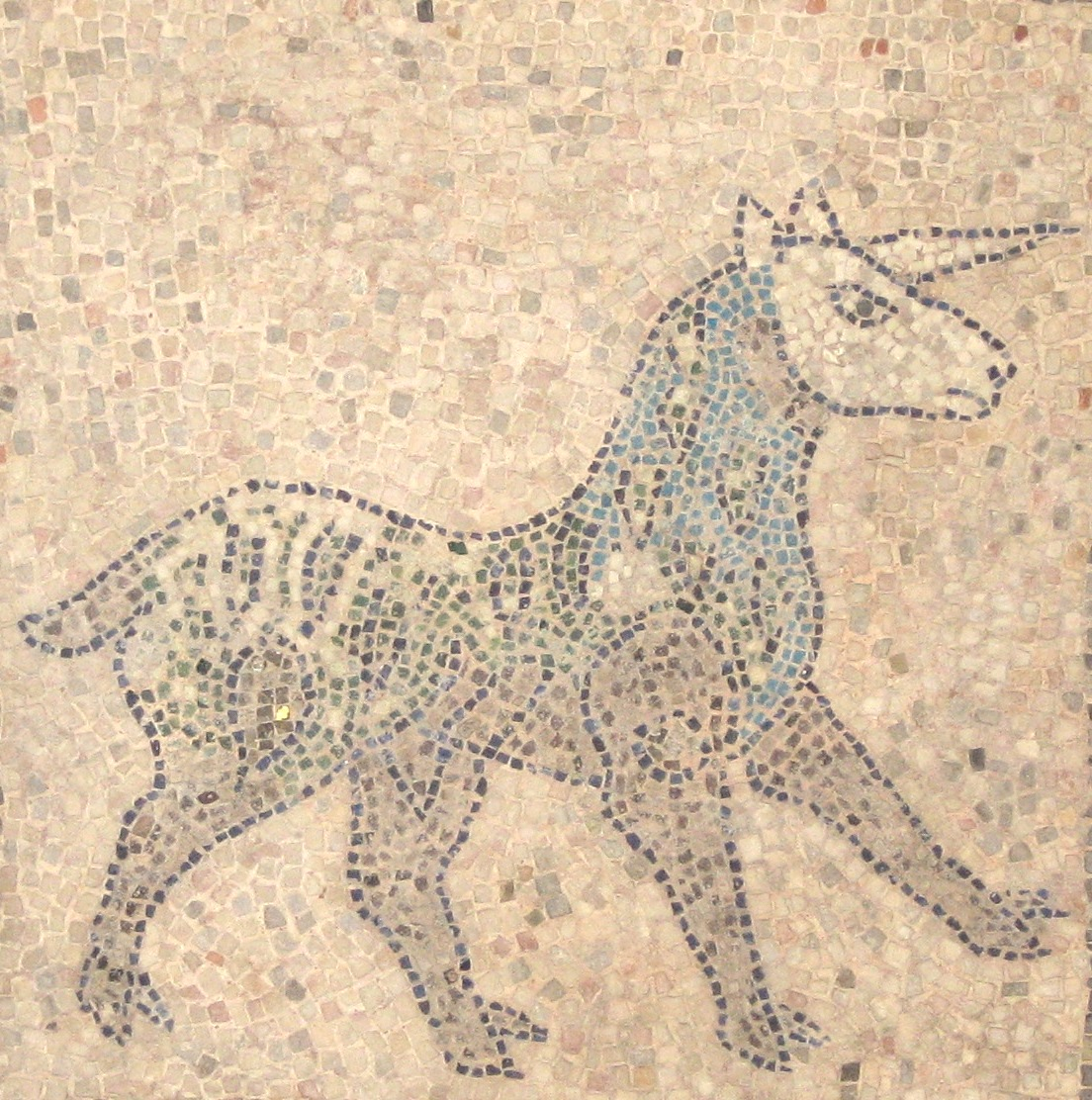
Unicorn mosaic on a 1213 church floor in Ravenna

An animal called the re'em (Hebrew: רְאֵם) is mentioned in several places in the Hebrew Bible, often as a metaphor representing strength. The allusions to the re'em as a wild, untamable animal of great strength and agility, with mighty horn or horns best fit the aurochs (Bos primigenius); this view is further supported by the Assyrian cognate word rimu, which is often used as a metaphor of strength, and is depicted as a powerful, fierce, wild mountain bull with large horns. This animal was often depicted in ancient Mesopotamian art in profile, with only one horn visible.

The translators of the Authorized King James Version of the Bible (1611) followed the Greek Septuagint (monokeros) and the Latin Vulgate (unicornis) and employed unicorn to translate re'em, providing a recognizable animal that was proverbial for its untamable nature. The American Standard Version translates this term "wild ox" in each case.

The classical Jewish understanding of the Bible did not identify the Re'em animal as the unicorn. However, some rabbis in the Talmud debate the proposition that the Tahash animal (Exodus 25, 26, 35, 36 and 39; Numbers 4; and Ezekiel 16:10) was a domestic, single-horned kosher creature that existed in Moses' time, or that it was similar to the keresh animal described in Marcus Jastrow's Talmudic dictionary as "a kind of antelope, unicorn".

=== Chinese mythology ===
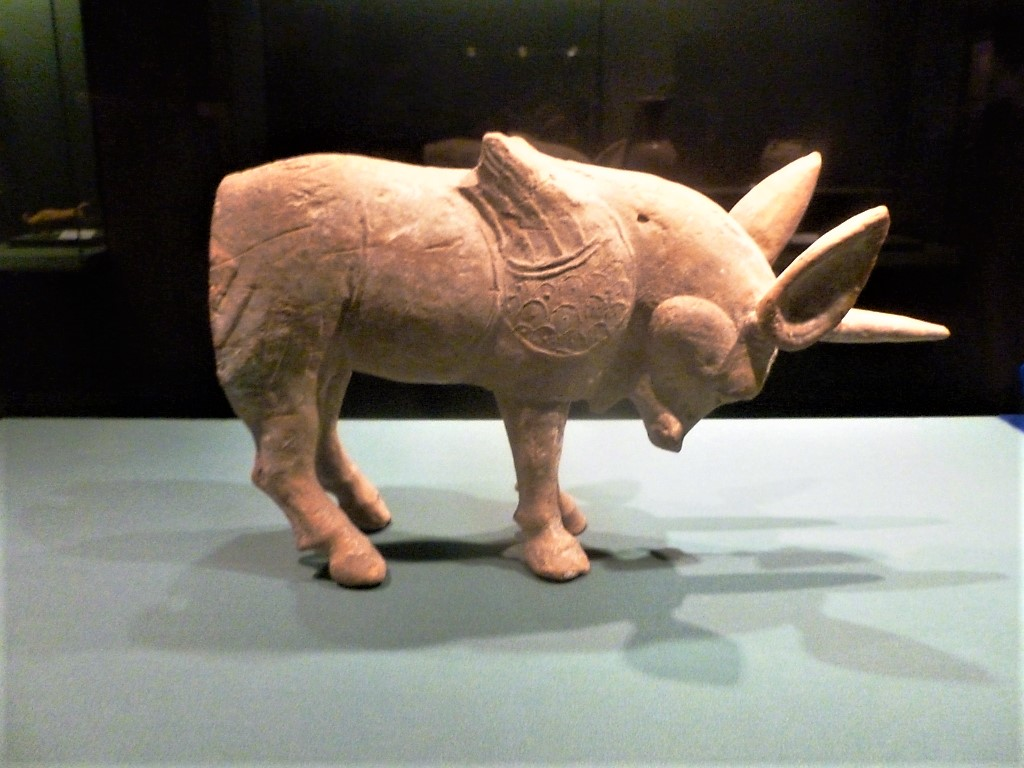
Pottery unicorn. Northern Wei. Shaanxi History Museum.

The qilin (Chinese: 麒麟), a creature in Chinese mythology, is sometimes called "the Chinese unicorn", and some ancient accounts describe a single horn as its defining feature. However, it is more accurately described as a hybrid animal that looks less unicorn than chimera, with the body of a deer, the head of a lion, green scales and a long forwardly-curved horn. The Japanese version (kirin) more closely resembles the Western unicorn, even though it is based on the Chinese qilin. The Quẻ Ly of Vietnamese myth, similarly sometimes mistranslated "unicorn" is a symbol of wealth and prosperity that made its first appearance during the Duong dynasty, about 600 CE, to Emperor Duong Cao To, after a military victory which resulted in his conquest of Tây Nguyên. In November 2012 the History Institute of the DPRK Academy of Social Sciences, as well as the Korea News Service, reported that the Kiringul had been found, which is associated with a kirin ridden by King Dongmyeong of Goguryeo.

Beginning in the Ming dynasty, the qilin became associated with giraffes, after Zheng He's voyage to East Africa brought a pair of the long-necked animals and introduced them at court in Nanjing as qilin. The resemblance to the qilin was noted in the giraffe's ossicones (bony protrusions from the skull resembling horns), graceful movements, and peaceful demeanor.

Shanhaijing (117) mentioned the Bo-horse (Chinese: 駮馬; pinyin: bómǎ), a chimera horse with an ox tail, a single horn, a white body, and a sound like a person calling. The creature was said to live at Honest-head Mountain. Guo Pu in his jiangfu said that the Bo-horse was able to walk on water. Another similar creature, also mentioned in Shanhaijing (80) and said to live in Mount Winding-Centre, was the Bo (Chinese: 駮; pinyin: bó), but it had a black tail, tiger's teeth and claws, devoured leopards and tigers.

== See also ==
- Al-mi'raj (unicorn-like creature in Arabic mythology)
- Bestiary
- Elasmotherium (extinct rhinoceros species known as "Siberian unicorn")
- Invisible Pink Unicorn (a modern satirical religious symbol)
- List of horses in mythology and folklore
- Monoceros (constellation)
- Okapi (real animal once known as "African unicorn")
- Pegasus
- Sin-you (mythology)
- Synthetoceras (extinct protoceratid/prehistoric pronghorn species, once lived throughout Eurasia and North America)
- Winged unicorn
