= Ivana (disambiguation) =

Ivana is a female given name.

Ivana may also refer to:

== People ==
- Ivana (singer) (born 1969), stage name of Bulgarian pop-folk singer Vanya Todorova Kaludova
- Ivana (actress) (born 2000), stage name of Indian actress Aleena Shaji
- Milan Ivana (born 1983), Slovak footballer

== Other uses ==
- Ivana, Batanes, a municipality in the Philippines
- Ivana Helsinki, a Finnish fashion company
- Ivana Las Vegas, a cancelled high-rise condominium project by Ivana Trump

== See also ==
- Ivan (disambiguation)
- Iwana (disambiguation)
