= Ivan Ivanovich =

Ivan Ivanovich (Russian: Иван Иванович) is an East Slavic personal name, a combination of a given name and a patronymic. Notable people commonly referred to as "Ivan Ivanovich" include:

== People ==
- Ivan II of Moscow (1326–1359), Grand Prince of Moscow and Grand Prince of Vladimir from 1353
- Ivan the Young (1458–1490), eldest son and heir of Ivan III of Russia
- Ivan V of Ryazan (1496–1533 or 1534), the last nominally independent ruler of Ryazan
- Tsarevich Ivan Ivanovich of Russia (1554–1581), second son and heir apparent of Ivan IV (the Terrible)
- Ivan Ivanovich Isaev, Russian general

== Other uses ==
- Ivan Ivanovich (Vostok programme), a mannequin used in testing the Russian Vostok spacecraft in preparation for its crewed missions
- SuitSat, a retired Russian Orlan spacesuit with a radio transmitter mounted on its helmet deployed as an OSCAR satellite in 2006
- Ivan Ivanovitch, an English-language idiom of the 19th century for a "lazy, good-hearted typical Russian"

== See also ==
- Ivan (disambiguation)
- Ivanović
