= List of legendary creatures (I) =

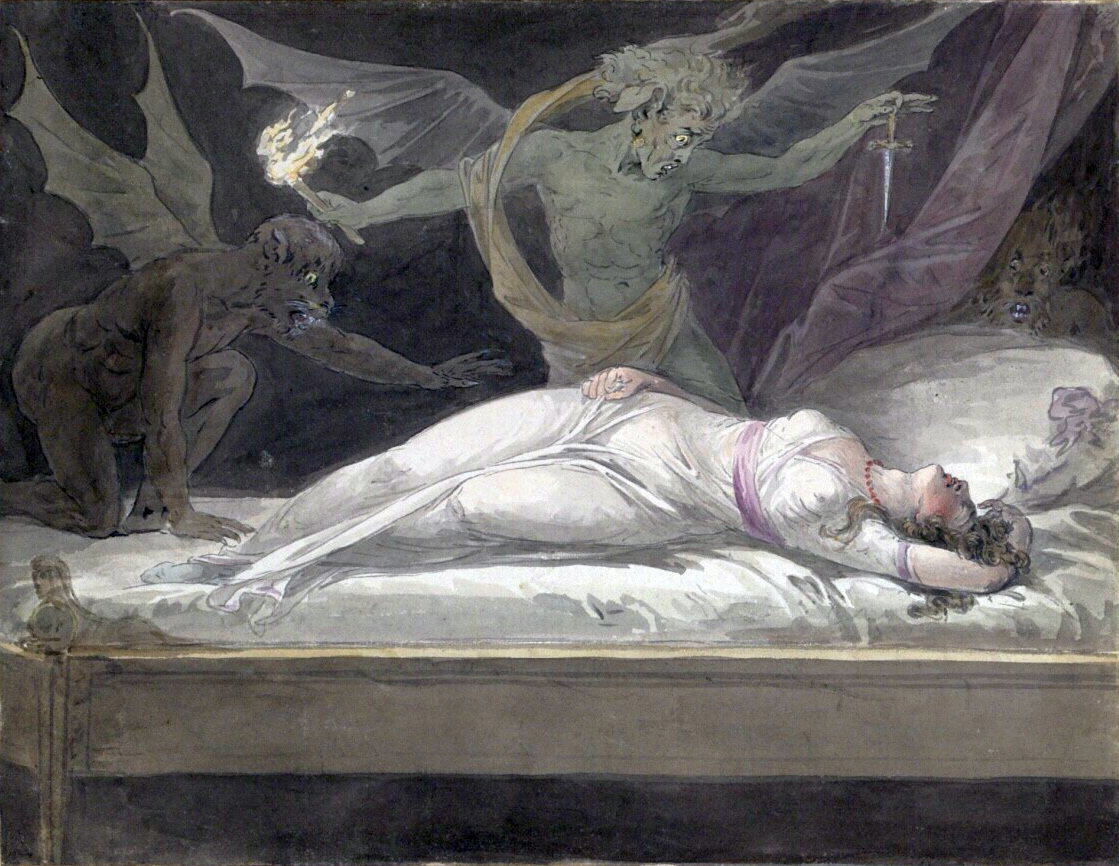
Incubus, 1870

1. Iannic-ann-ôd (Breton) – Ghost of a drowned person
2. Iara (Brazilian) – Female water spirit
3. Ibong Adarna (Philippine) – Bird that changes color when it finishes a song
4. Ichchhadhari Nag (Hindu) – Shapeshifting venomous snakes
5. Ichimoku-nyūdō (Japanese) – One-eyed kappa from Sado Island
6. Ichiren-Bozu (Japanese) – Animated prayer beads
7. Ichneumon (Medieval Bestiaries) – Dragon-killing animal
8. Ichthyocentaur (Greek) – Human-fish-horse hybrid
9. Iele (Romanian) – Female nature spirits
10. Ifrit (Arabian) – Fire genie
11. İye – Spirit in Turkic mythology
12. Ijiraq (Inuit) – Spirit that kidnaps children
13. Ikiryō (Japanese) – Can be considered a 'living ghost', as it is a person's spirit outside their body
14. Ikuchi (Japanese) – Sea serpent that travels over boats in an arc while dripping oil
15. Iku-Turso (Finnish) – Sea monster
16. Il-Belliegħa (Maltese) – Malevolent well spirit
17. Imp (Medieval) – Small demonic servant
18. Impundulu (Southern Africa) – Avian, vampiric lightning spirit
19. Imugi (Korean) – Flightless, dragon-like creatures (sometimes thought of as proto-dragons)
20. Inapertwa (Aboriginal) – Simple organisms, used by creator-gods to make everything else
21. Incubus (Judeo-Christian) – Male night-demon and seducer
22. Indrik (Russian) – One-horned horse-bull hybrid
23. Indus Worm (Medieval Bestiaries) – Giant, white, carnivorous worm
24. Inkanyamba (Zulu) – Horse-headed serpent
25. Inugami (Japanese) – Dog spirit
26. Ior (Romanian) – Giant creature, with good spirit
27. Ipotane (Greek) – Two-legged horse-human hybrid, (as opposed to the four-legged centaur)
28. Ippon-datara (Japanese) – One-legged mountain spirit
29. Iratxoak (Basque) – Small demonic servants
30. Irin (Jewish) – Fallen angels
31. Ishigaq (Inuit) – Little people
32. Island Satyr (Medieval Bestiaries) – Savage human-goat hybrid from a remote island chain
33. Isonade (Japanese) – Shark-like sea monster
34. Ittan-momen (Japanese) – Ghostly aerial phenomenon that attacks people
35. Iwana-bōzu (Japanese) – Char which appeared as a Buddhist monk
