= Iwan (disambiguation) =

Iwan is a rectangular hall or space, commonly associated with Islamic architecture.

Iwan may also refer to:

- Iwan (name), a male given name and a surname
- Iwan (musician) (born 1985), Ghanaian reggae and dance hall performer
- Iwan (singer) (born 1980), Lebanese singer
- 3634 Iwan, a main-belt asteroid

== See also ==
- Ivan (disambiguation)
- Iwana (disambiguation)
- Eyvan, a city in Iran
