= Khutu =

Material used by medieval Islamic cutlers for knife handles

Khutu was the name given to a material used by medieval Islamic cutlers for knife handles. The ultimate source of the material has been a matter of conjecture for more than a thousand years; Islamic polymath al-Biruni was among the first to investigate it and debate about the material—especially its source—continues to this day. The hypothesized sources for the material have included narwhal, walrus, and mammoth ivory, the frontal bones of bulls, goats, and birds, the teeth of snakes, fish, and hippopotamuses, and the root of a tree. The most recent investigation, by natural historian Chris Lavers, has pointed to the frontal boss of the horns of the muskox.

Khutu has been ascribed properties other than those of a work material. It was, for example, described as an alexipharmic—a property that eventually was attached to alicorn, the supposed horn of the unicorn.

== Medieval scholarship ==
=== Abu Rayhan Biruni ===
Islamic polymath al-Biruni (973–1048) was among the first to investigate khutu, which he referred to as al-chutww. He described it as being from the land of the Kirgiz in the northern part of the Turkish territory and mentioned that it was in great demand in Egypt. He noted that the material came in a variety of colours, with yellowish-green being best, followed by those coloured camphor, white, "like the sun", and dark grey. He also mentioned the beliefs that the material came from the forehead of the roc (an enormous bird from Arabic and Persian myths which was said to carry off and eat elephants) or the forehead of a hippopotamus, but did not seem to attach much weight to these ideas, noting that it was much more similar to the frontal bone of a bull or goat. He wrote: "It originates from an animal; it is much in demand, and preserved in the treasuries among the Chinese who assert that it is a desirable article because the approach of poison causes it to exude."

In another work he described it as "bigger than the hand in size" and "thicker than two fingers" and mentioned that "Amir Abu Ja'far bin Banu has a large box-like case made of long and broad khutu planks." Because the material gave off a fishy smell when burned, he felt that it was probably a marine creature of some kind, but he specifically noted an instance where someone was able to pass off walrus ivory for proper khutu, strongly implying that the two materials were distinct – at least to him.

=== Ibn al-Husayn Kashgari ===
Writing shortly after al-Biruni, Kashgari mentioned khutu in his work Diwan Lughat at-Turk (c. 1075):

"Horn of a sea fish imported from China. It is (also) said that it is the root of a tree. It is used for knife handles. The presence of poison in food is put to the test by it because when broth or other dishes in the bowl are stirred with it the food cooks without fire (if poison is present in it), or if the horn is placed on a bowl it (the horn) sweats without steam."

=== Ibn al-Akfani ===
The next investigation of khutu was by Ibn al-Akfani (1286–ca. 1348-49), who called the material chartut. Although he cited al-Biruni's earlier work, he disagreed with a number of Al-Biruni's conclusions. For example, he favoured the theory that khutu came from the forehead of a large bird. He also offered a slightly different spectrum of possible colours for khutu (yellow, red, apricot, dust, black), though he did agree that the quality of the material varied with the colour.

== Modern scholarship ==
=== Berthold Laufer ===
The era of modern scholarship on the identity of khutu began with the work of the orientalist Berthold Laufer. The first paper was titled "Arabic and Chinese Trade in Walrus and Narwhal Ivory" and published in the journal T'oung Pao in 1913. Laufer provided a brief overview of the medieval scholarship and provided detailed information regarding the trade of narwhal and walrus ivory on the basis that khutu referred to one or both of those items. A second paper, titled "Supplementary Notes on Walrus and Narwhal Ivory" was published in 1916 in the same journal and provided some corrections and clarifications of his earlier work.

=== Richard Ettinghausen ===
While Laufer had detailed the Chinese end of the narwhal and walrus ivory trade, Richard Ettinghausen focused on the Arabic side. Like Laufer, he felt that khutu was probably walrus ivory, with perhaps some samples being narwhal ivory.

=== Chris Lavers ===
The most recent work on khutu has been done by Chris Lavers. In contrast to the early 20th century scholars, Lavers does not believe khutu to have been either walrus or narwhal ivory, but rather the frontal bone and associated horn material of the muskox, with some specimens perhaps coming from mammoth ivory. His primary evidence for this was the work of al-Biruni, particularly where he mentions that knowledgeable people could differentiate walrus ivory from proper khutu (a fact that Laufer could not have known in his earlier work, as the al-Biruni text mentioning it had not yet been translated). In The Natural History of Unicorns he acknowledges that Asian muskoxen were supposed to have become extinct about a thousand years before al-Biruni's investigations (see muskox for information regarding their extinction and reintroduction), but points out that there could well have been an isolated refugium of muskoxen existing in Asia until more modern times, that it was possible that there was trade in material goods between Asian arctic and North American arctic peoples, and also that frozen or fossilized muskoxen material could have been harvested in the same way that mammoth ivory was.
