= Re'em =

Animal mentioned in the Hebrew Bible

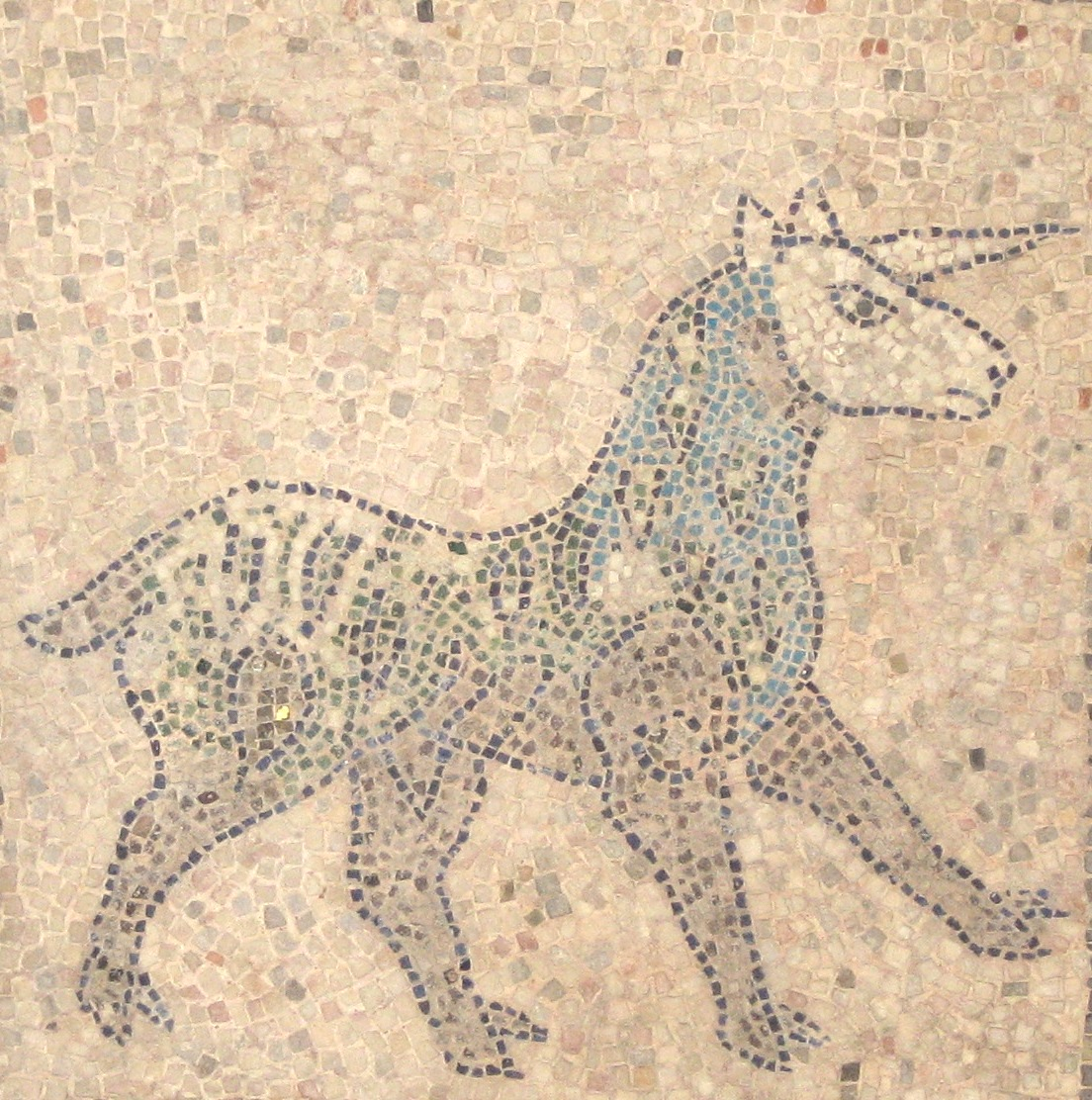
Detail of a former floor mosaic dating from year 1213, Basilica of San Giovanni Evangelista, Ravenna.

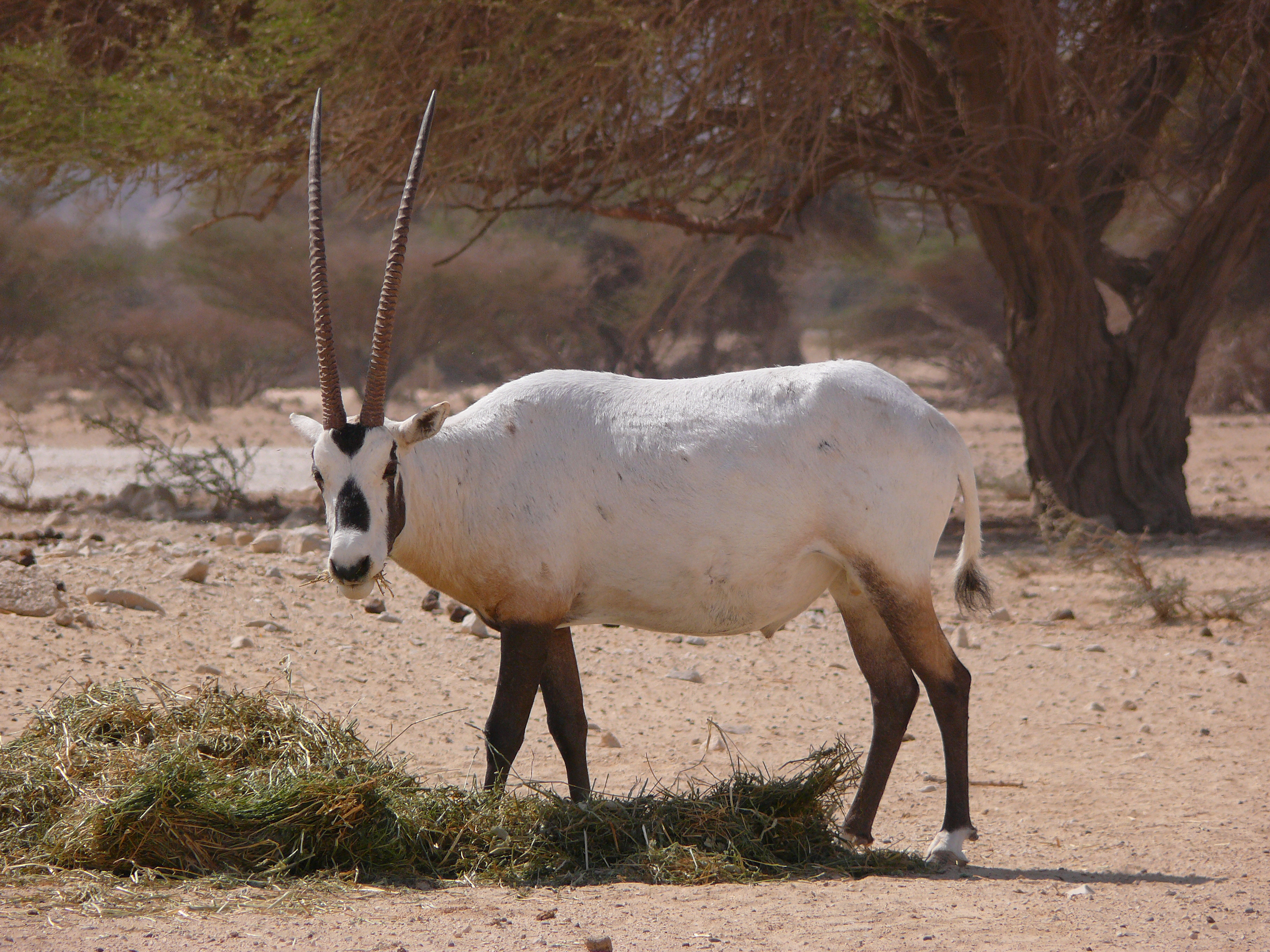
Oryx in Yotvata Hai-Bar Nature Reserve in Israel.

A re'em, also reëm (Hebrew: רְאֵם, romanized: rəʾēm), is an animal mentioned nine times in the Hebrew Bible. (Note: Job 39:9–10, Deuteronomy 33:17, Numbers 23:22 and 24:8; Psalms 22:21, 29:6 and 92:10; and Isaiah 34:7.) It has been translated as "unicorn" in the Latin Vulgate, King James Version, and in some Christian Bible translations as "oryx" (which was accepted as the referent in Modern Hebrew), "wild ox", "wild bull", "buffalo" or "rhinoceros". Natan Slifkin has argued that the re'em was an aurochs, as has Isaac Asimov before him. Paleontologist Darren Naish also contends that the Biblical re'em was an aurochs, based on depictions of the animal on the Babylonian Ishtar Gate.

== Translation ==
The King James Version of the Book of Job followed the Septuagint and Jerome's Vulgate in the translation of re'em into unicorn:

Will the unicorn be willing to serve thee, or abide by thy crib? Canst thou bind the unicorn with his band in the furrow? or will he harrow the valleys after thee? Wilt thou trust him, because his strength is great? or wilt thou leave thy labour to him? Wilt thou believe him, that he will bring home thy seed, and gather it into thy barn?

— Job 39:9–12

Some Bible translations into English, including the American Standard Version and New American Standard Bible, interpret re'em as "wild ox" or "wild bull".
