= Ivan (model) =

Japanese model

- Born: Liera Manuel Ivan; 9 February 1984 (age 42)
- Occupations: Fashion model; musician
- Years active: 2002–present
- Modeling information
- Height: 184.5 cm (6 ft 1 in)

Liera Manuel Ivan (born 9 February 1984), professionally known by her mononym Ivan (stylized as IVAN), is a Japanese transgender model, musician, and tarento belonging to LesPros Entertainment. She underwent a sex reassignment surgery in Thailand.

== Biography ==
Born in Mexico, her family moved to Nara when she was two years old. Her father is of Japanese and Spanish descent, while her mother is Mexican. She later gained Mexican nationality. In 1998, she was selected as a participant of the first Okinawa Actors School Tokyo and received singing and dancing lessons for about a year. Afterwards, she went to the United States and went to a high school in California. In 2004 she was selected as a model of Paris Fashion Week and since she is active as one of the world's top fashion models. From 2007, she started her music career produced by Hakuei, the vocalist of the Penicillin. However, after that, she suddenly disappeared from the dormitory of her former affiliation office due to the disagreements in the direction of the music career and financial problems. During this time, she experienced homelessness.

When she first appeared on Ariyoshi's Meeting for Reviewing (Nippon TV) on 28 September 2013, she confessed that she came out as "Onē." Since then, she has been openly active as a transgender tarento.

On 12 April 2017, she experienced a severe abdominal pain, which was later diagnosed as acute peritonitis and she was hospitalised.

== Major appearances ==
=== TV dramas ===
- Rental no Koi (9 Feb 2017, TBS)
- Shark –2nd Season– (19 Apr 2017 –, NTV) – as Samantha

=== Variety ===
- Sound Kids (Aug 2007, TKU)
- Indies Hot Line (Aug 2007, Sky PerfecTV! 267ch)
- Paroparo mini (Sep 2007, TUF)
- FreePass –Ongaku Senka– (Sep 2007, TSC)
- Ariyoshi's Meeting for Reviewing (28 Sep 2013 –, NTV) – Regular reflecting person
- Utage! (21 Apr 2014 –, TBS)
- Akashiya TV (Sep 2015 –, MBS) – Occasional appearances
- Cream Quiz Miracle 9 (EX) – Occasional appearances

=== Advertisements ===
- Nara Electric Co., Ltd. (Yamamoto Shōji) (1 Dec 2015 –, TVN)
- Boat Race Promotion Organisation "Dynamite Boat Race" (1 Nov 2016 –)

=== Stage ===
- Musical Rent (8 Sep – 9 Oct 2015, Theatre Creation) – as Angel

== Modelling activities ==
Magazines

- Men's Non-no
- smartMax
- Popeye
- Fineboys
- Esquire
- Huge
- Kera
- GQ Japan
- Gekkan Debut
- Josei Jishin

Main shows

- Number (N) Ine (Tokyo Collection)
- Roen (Tokyo Collection)
- N.Hollywood (Tokyo Collection)
- issey miyake (Tokyo Collection)
- Solid Homme (Seoul Collection)
- John Galliano (Paris Fashion Week)

== Music works ==
Singles

1. Love Me Tender (TMLA-0001, 25 Jul 2007)
2. Darker Pink (TMLA-0002, 25 Jul 2007)
3. Hikari (TMLA-0004, 24 Oct 2007)
