= Indrik =

Beast in Russian folklore

In the Dove Book and Russian folklore, Indrik or the Indrik-Beast (Russian: Индрик-зверь, romanized: Indrik-zver') is a fabulous beast, the king of all animals, who lives on a mountain known as "The Holy Mountain" where no other foot may tread. When it stirs, the Earth trembles. The word "Indrik" is a distorted version of the Russian word for unicorn (Russian: Единорог, romanized: jedinorog). It is described as a gigantic bull with legs of a deer, the head of a horse and an enormous horn in its snout, making it vaguely similar to a rhinoceros.

The Russian folkloric creature gives its name to a synonym of Paraceratherium, Indricotherium, the biggest land mammal ever to live.

== See also ==
- Camahueto
- Elasmotherium
- Unicorn

== Sources ==
- Bane, Theresa (22 May 2016). "Indrik the Beast". Encyclopedia of Beasts and Monsters in Myth, Legend and Folklore. McFarland. p. 171. ISBN 978-1-4766-2268-2.
