= Ivaň (Prostějov District) =

- Municipality
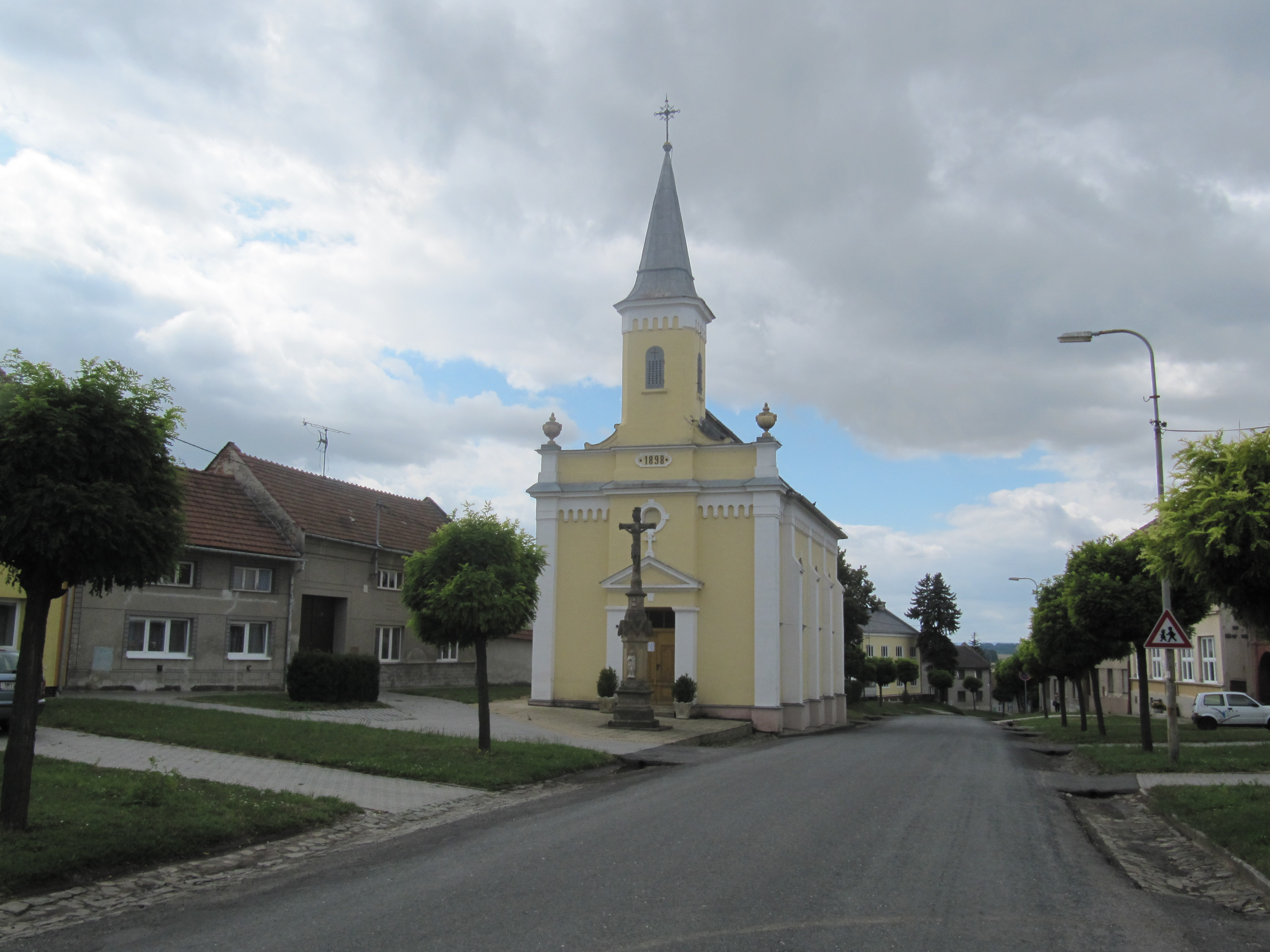
- Church of Saint Florian

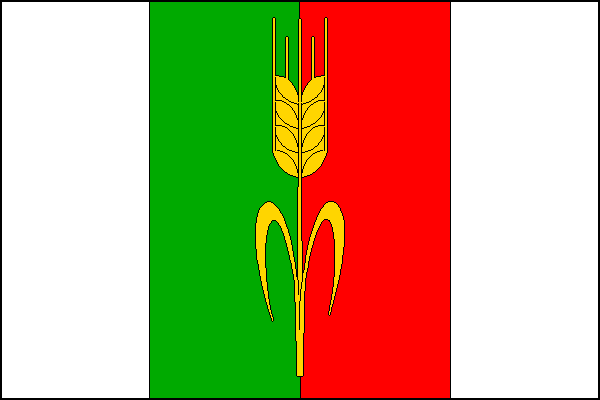
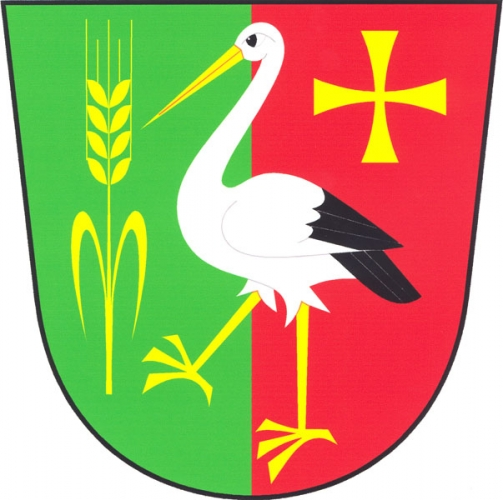
- Flag Coat of arms

- Location in the Czech Republic
- Coordinates: 49°25′29″N 17°15′5″E
- Country: Czech Republic
- Region: Olomouc
- District: Prostějov
- First mentioned: 1359

Area
  - Total: 7.30 km^{2} (2.82 sq mi)
- Elevation: 208 m (682 ft)

Population (2026-01-01)
  - Total: 466
  - Density: 63.8/km^{2} (165/sq mi)
- Time zone: UTC+1 (CET)
  - Summer (DST): UTC+2 (CEST)
- Postal code: 798 23
- Website: www.obecivan.cz

Ivaň is a municipality and village in Prostějov District in the Olomouc Region of the Czech Republic. It has about 500 inhabitants.

Ivaň lies approximately 12 kilometres (7 mi) south-east of Prostějov, 19 km (12 mi) south of Olomouc, and 216 km (134 mi) east of Prague.

== Demographics ==
Historical population
Year	Pop.	±%
1869	598	—
1880	637	+6.5%
1890	644	+1.1%
1900	666	+3.4%
1910	680	+2.1%
1921	679	−0.1%
1930	741	+9.1%
1950	632	−14.7%
1961	647	+2.4%
1970	617	−4.6%
1980	576	−6.6%
1991	514	−10.8%
2001	478	−7.0%
2011	466	−2.5%
2021	427	−8.4%
Source: Censuses
