= Shadhavar =

Legendary creature from medieval Muslim bestiaries resembling a unicorn

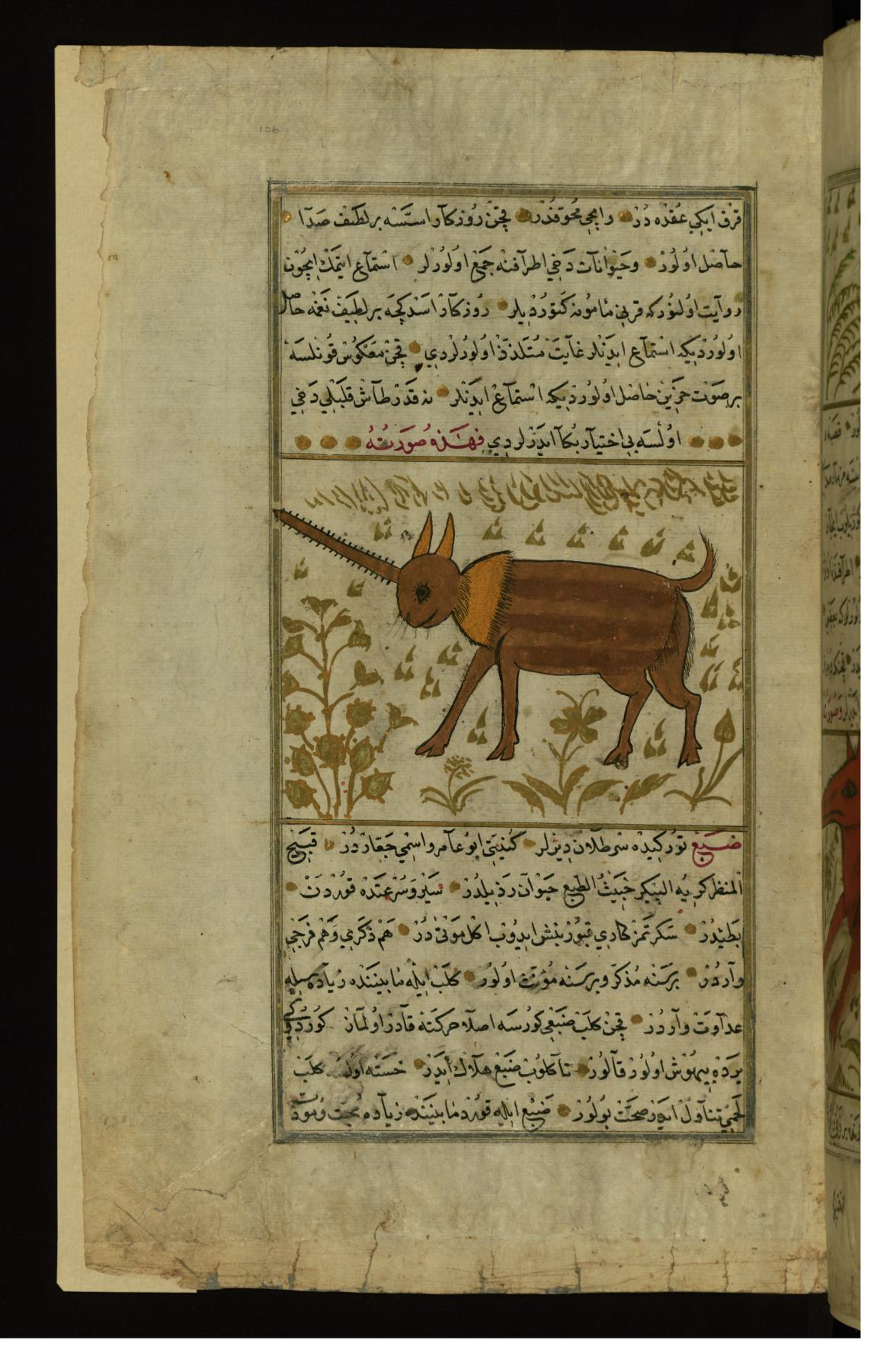
This folio from Walters manuscript W659 depicts the Aras, an animal with one horn.

Shâd'havâr (Arabic: شادهافار (Šādhāfār)) or Âras (آرس) is a legendary creature from medieval Muslim bestiaries resembling a unicorn. Al-Qazwini said that it lives in the country of Rūm (Byzantium) and that it has one horn with 42 hollow branches which, when the wind passes through them, produces a pleasant sound that makes the animals sit around and listen. Horns of those creatures, sometimes gifted to kings, can be played like flutes. When played on one side, they produce a cheerful sound, and when on the other, the music is so sad it makes people cry.

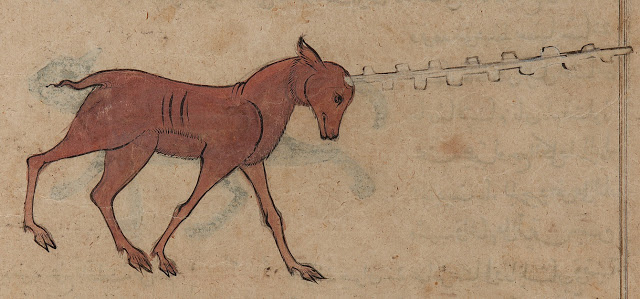
Shâd'havâr.

The scholar Al-Damiri stated a larger number of branches to 72, and al-Mustawfi made shadhavar a ferocious carnivore. The change can be explained as a result of merging its description with another creature from Qazwini, the Sirânis (سيرانس), a predator that plays music to lure its victims. G. Jacob pointed out similarities between the Sirânis and the sirens from Greek mythology.
