= Lou Carcolh =

Mythical beast in French folklore

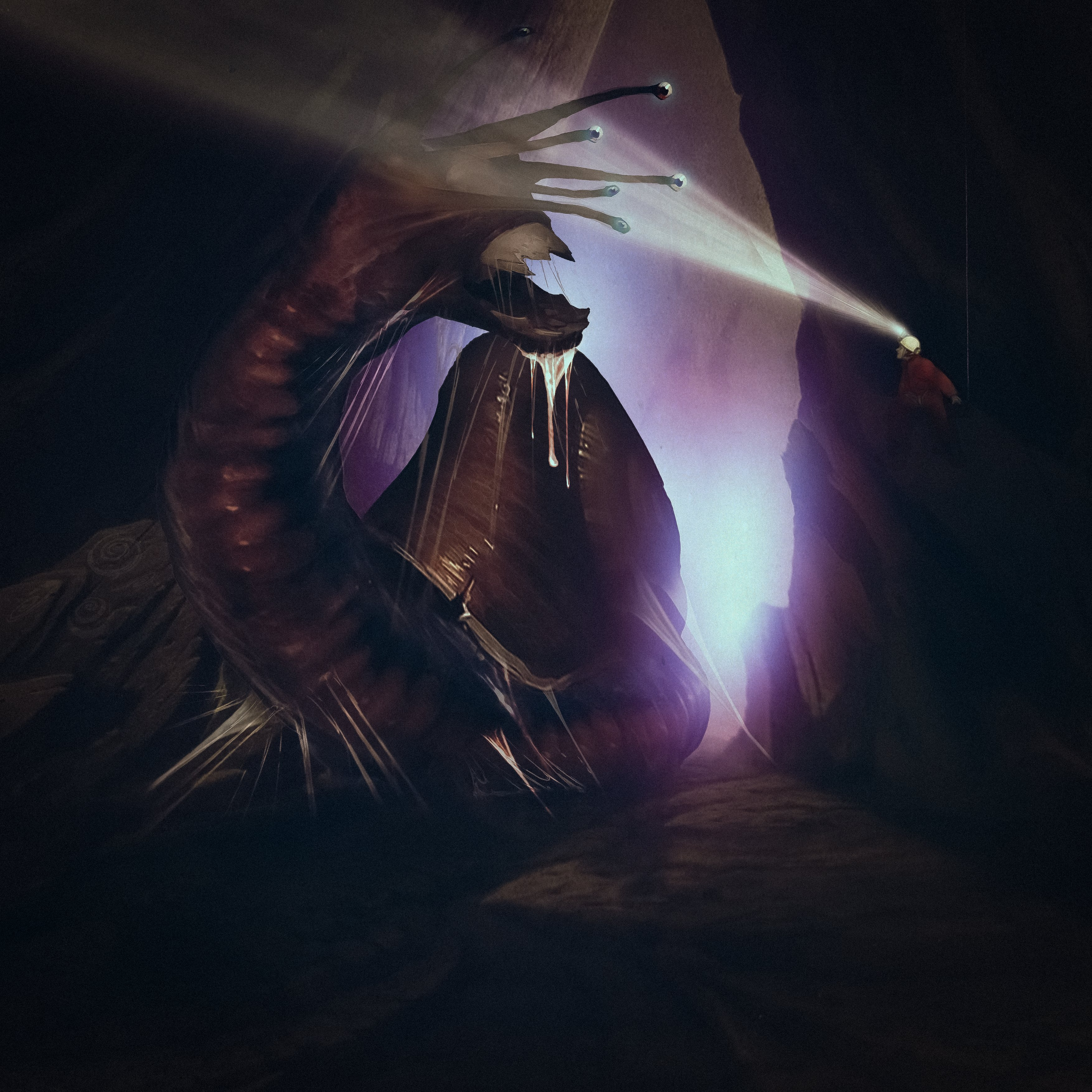
Artist rendition of the Carcolh of the town of Hastingues

Lou Carcolh, or the Carcolh, is a mythical beast from French folklore. It is described as a large, slimy, snail-like serpent with hairy tentacles and a large shell. It is said to live in a cavern beneath Hastingues, a town in the Les Landes region in southwestern France.

It is described to have a slime that could sometimes be seen long before the creature itself arrived, and its tentacles had a great reach that would be used to grab and drag prey into its cave without leaving.

The Carcolh is a nickname given to the city of Hastingues in the French department of Landes due to its situation on a rounded-shape hill.

== Sources ==
Rose, Carol (2000). Giants, Monsters, and Dragons: An Encyclopedia of Folklore, Legend, and Myth. ABC-CLIO, Inc. ISBN 0-87436-988-6.
