= Hastingues =

- Commune
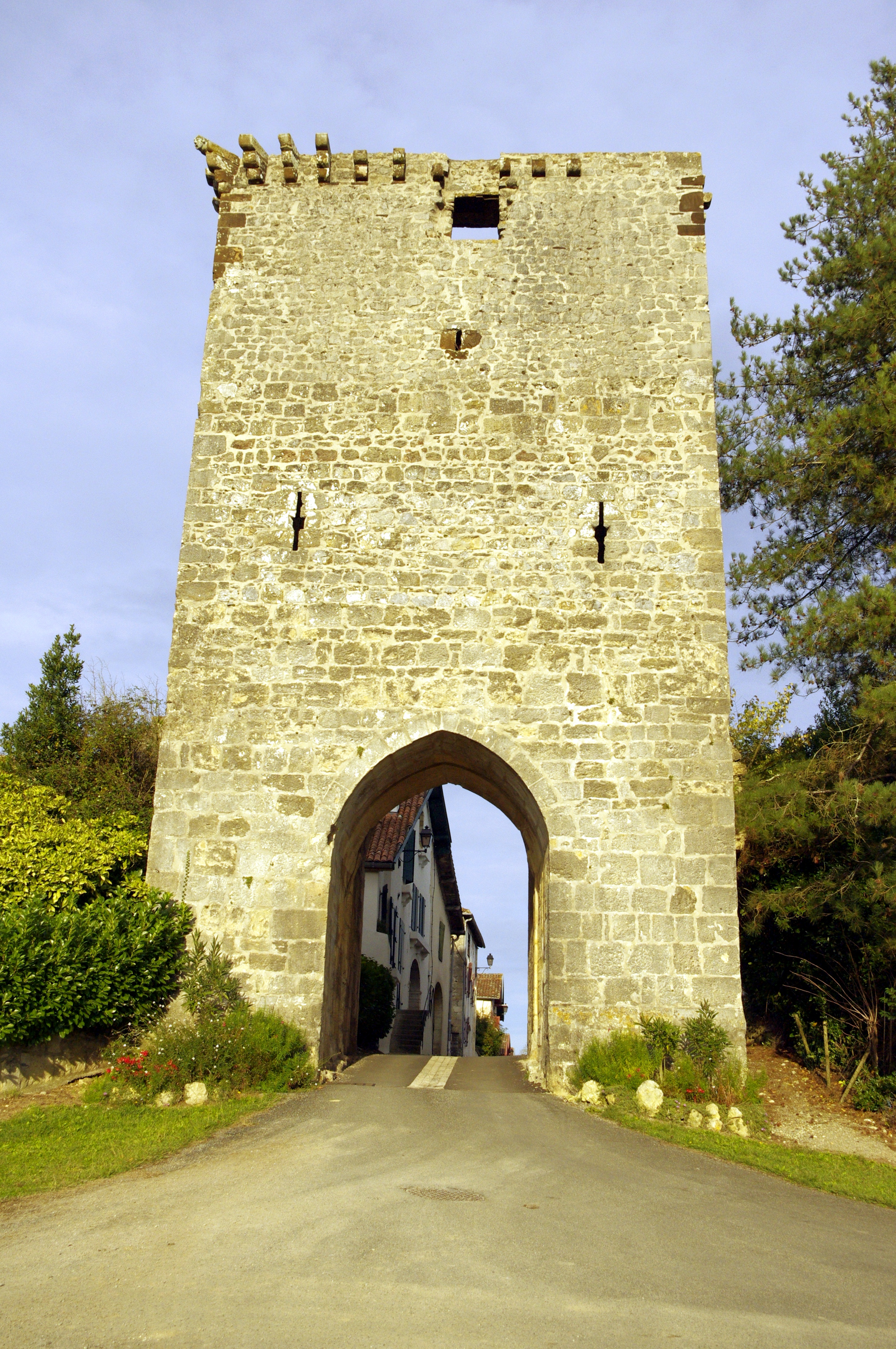
- Gate of Hastingues from the 14th century
- Location of Hastingues
- Location within France Location within Nouvelle-Aquitaine
- Coordinates: 43°32′07″N 1°08′52″W
- Country: France
- Region: Nouvelle-Aquitaine
- Department: Landes
- Arrondissement: Dax
- Canton: Orthe et Arrigans
- Intercommunality: Pays d'Orthe et Arrigans

Government
  - Mayor (2020–2026): Corine de Passos
- Area^{1}: 14.54 km^{2} (5.61 sq mi)
- Elevation: 44 m (144 ft)
- Highest elevation: 84 m (276 ft)
- Lowest elevation: 0 m (0 ft)
- Population (2023): 609
  - Density: 41.9/km^{2} (108/sq mi)
- Time zone: UTC+01:00 (CET)
  - Summer (DST): UTC+02:00 (CEST)
- INSEE/Postal code: 40120 /40300
- ^{1} French Land Register data, which excludes lakes, ponds, glaciers > 1 km^{2} (0.386 sq mi or 247 acres) and river estuaries.

Hastingues (French pronunciation: [astɛ̃ɡ]; Occitan: Hastings, Basque: Hastinga) is a commune in the Landes department in Nouvelle-Aquitaine in southwestern France. Its nickname, due to its location on a rounded-shaped hill, is Lou Carcolh (the snail).

== Geography ==
The town lies on a hill looking over the valley of the Gaves réunis, in the Gascon region and bordering on the Basque Country.

== History ==
The bastide was founded in 1289 by John Hastings, seneschal of Gascony, who signed a treaty of coregency in the name of Edward I of England between the king, Duke of Aquitaine and the monks of Arthous abbey.

The work on the gate was started in 1289, but the town wall still was not complete in the 15th century.

The houses of Jurats and Sénéchal were built in the same century.

== Population ==
Historical population
Year	Pop.	±% p.a.
1968	401	—
1975	408	+0.25%
1982	447	+1.31%
1990	472	+0.68%
1999	447	−0.60%
2007	535	+2.27%
2012	607	+2.56%
2017	579	−0.94%
2023	609	+0.85%
Source: INSEE

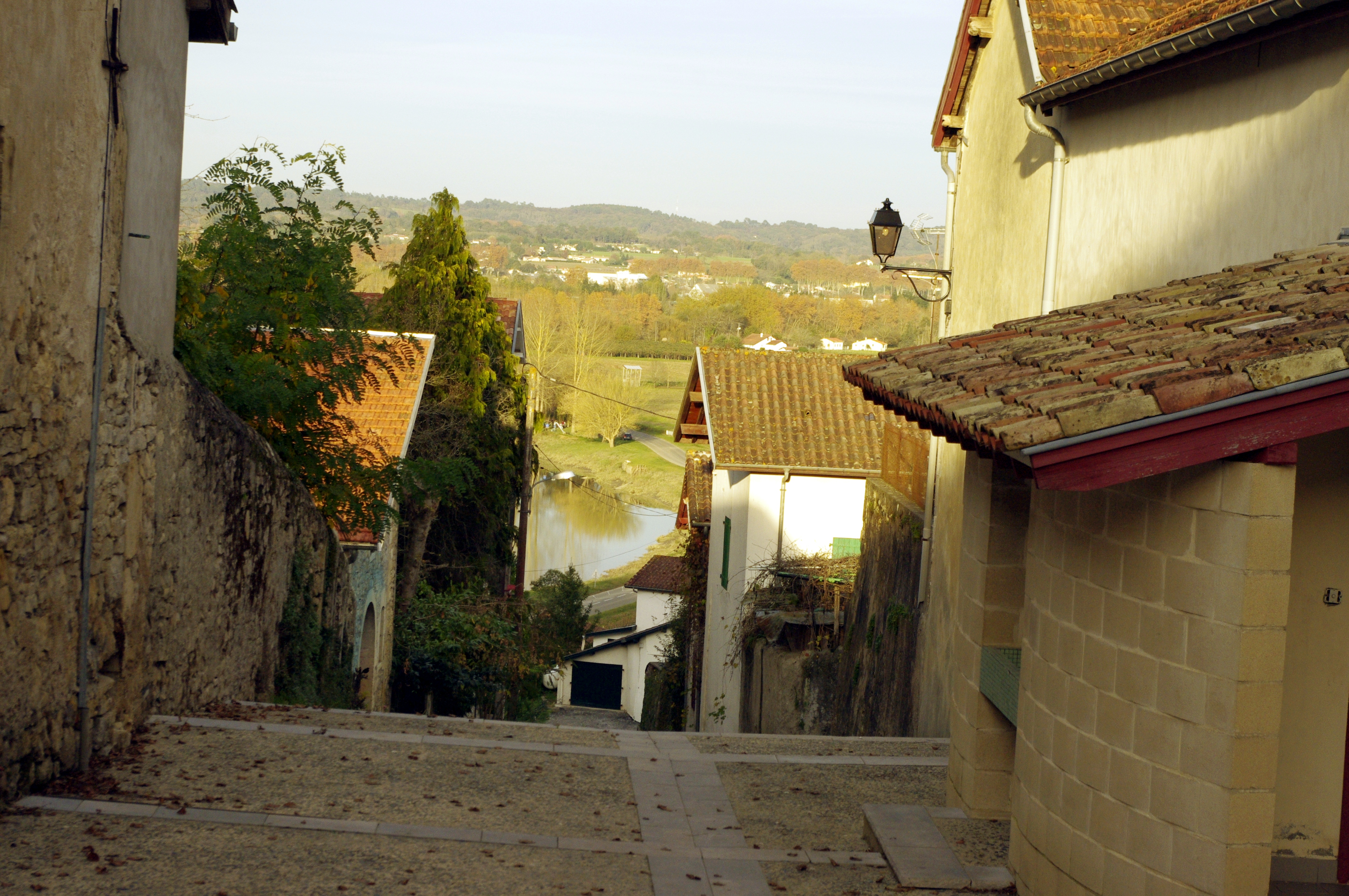
View from the town over the valley and the river

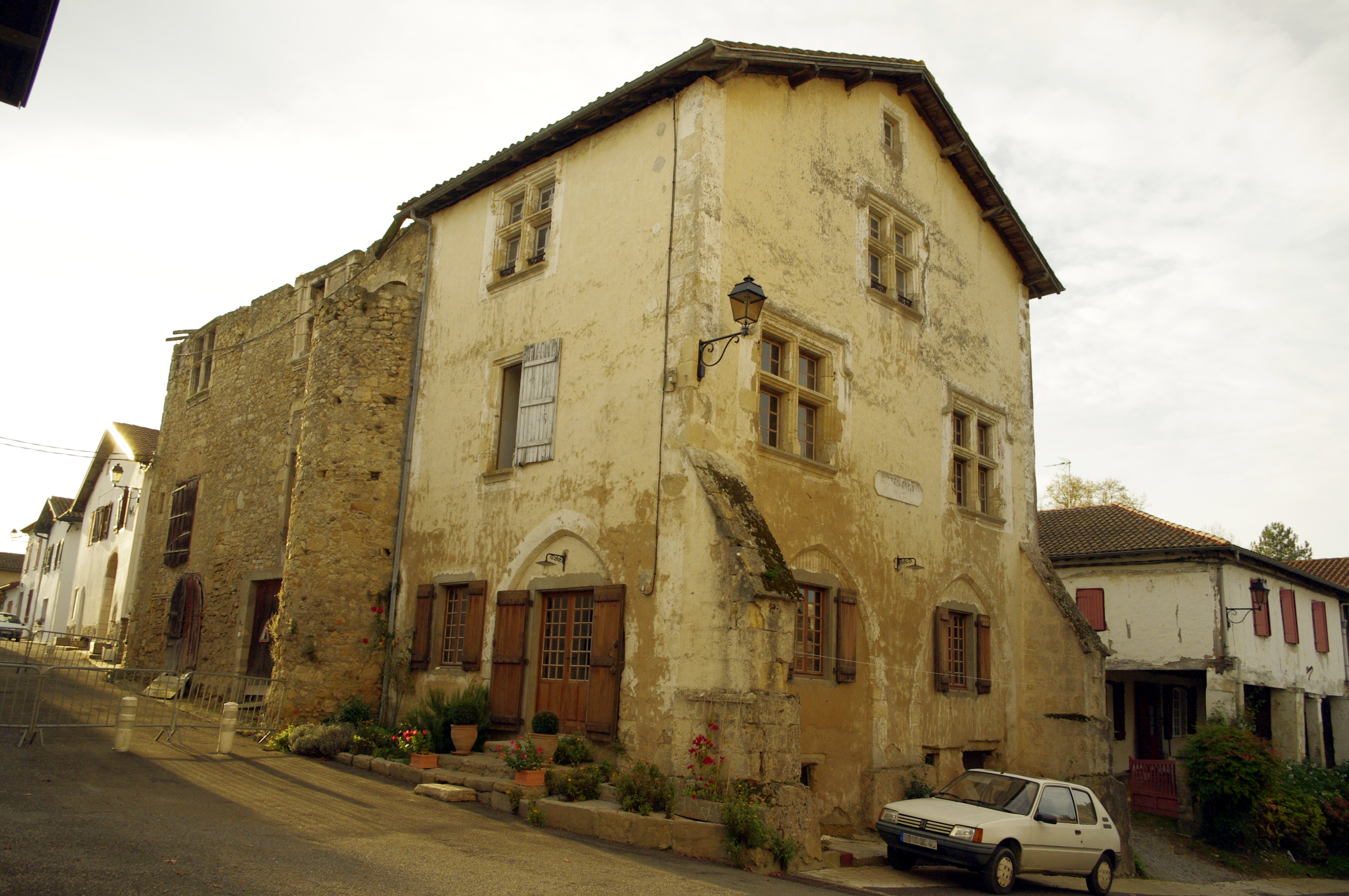
Maison Jurats

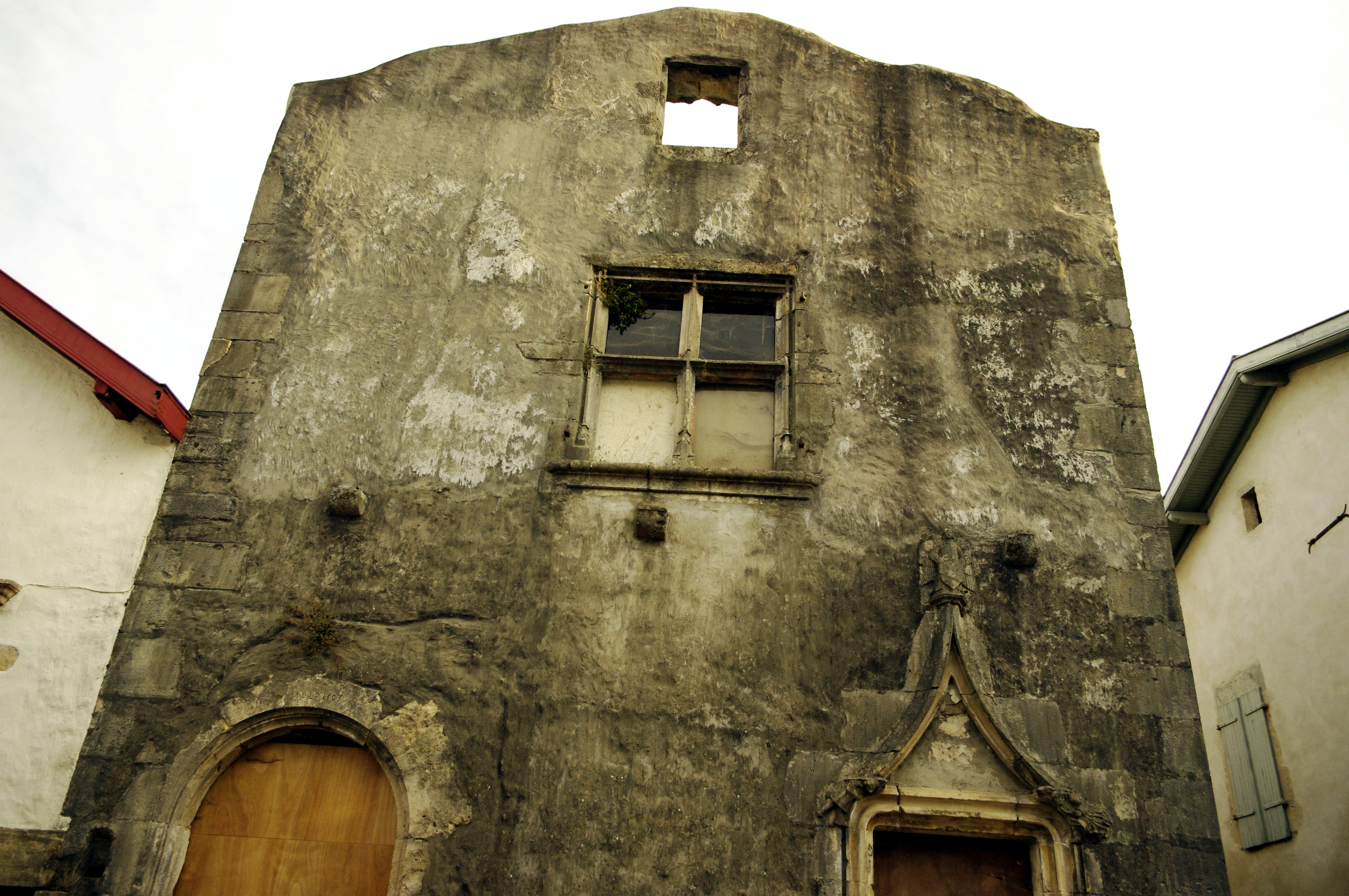
House of the Seneschal

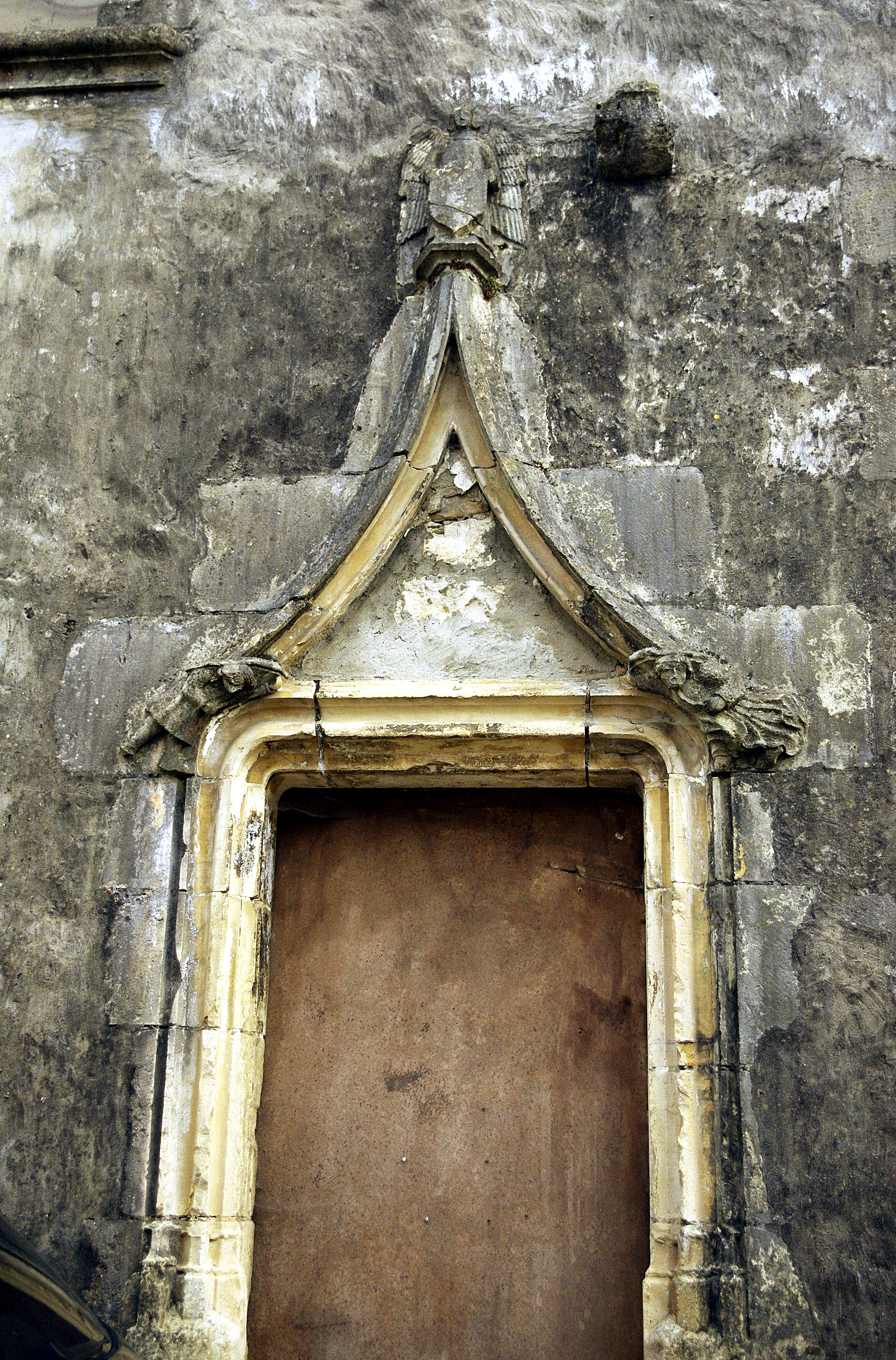
Entrance of the house of the Seneschal

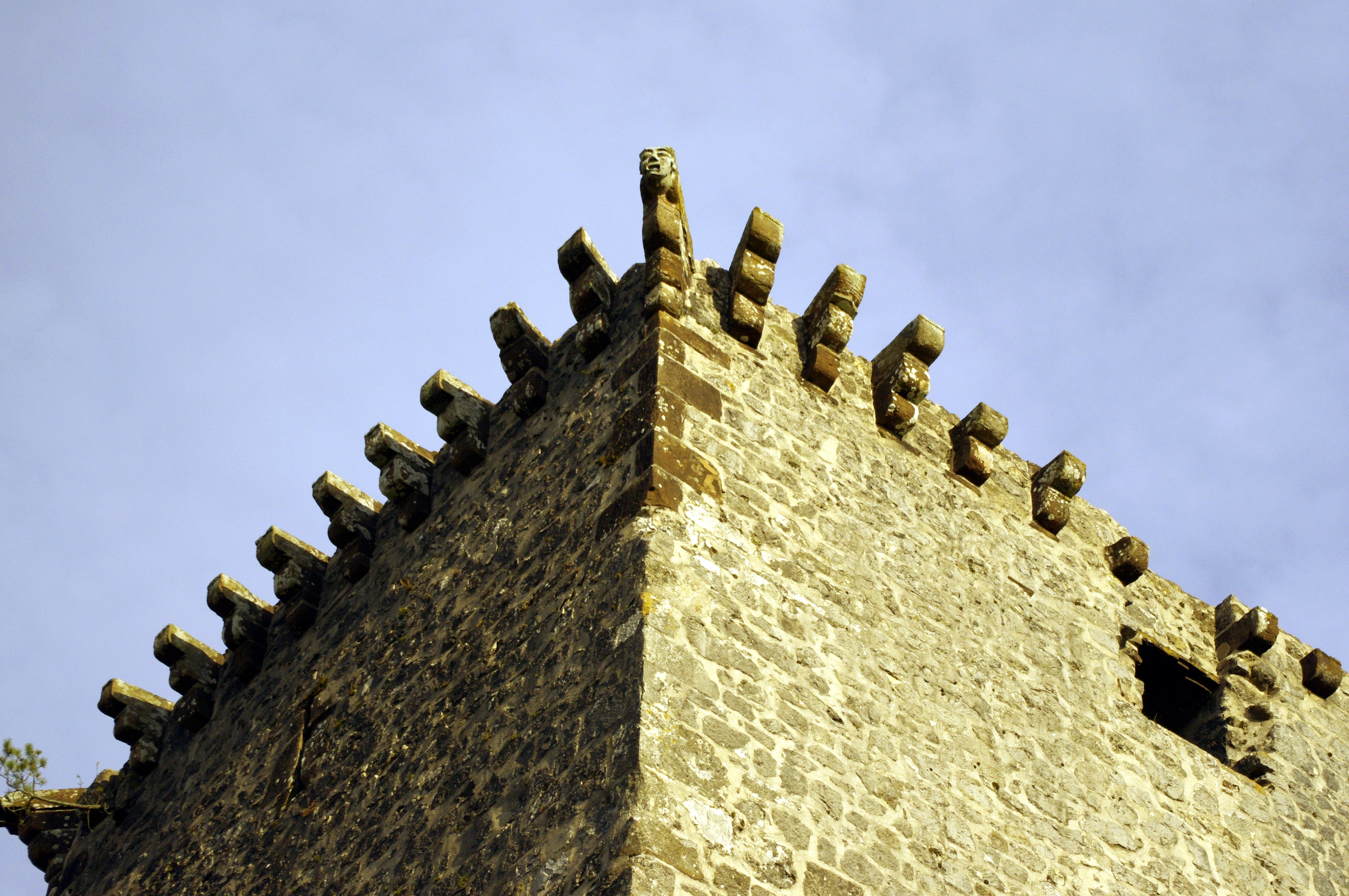
Detail of the gate

== See also ==
- Communes of the Landes department
- Lou Carcolh
