= Australian folklore =

Australian folklore refers to the folklore and urban legends that have evolved in Australia from Aboriginal Australian myths to colonial and contemporary folklore including people, places and events, that have played part in shaping the culture, image and traditions that are seen in contemporary Old Australia.

== Definitions ==
Folklore:

1. The traditional beliefs, myths, tales, and practices of a people, transmitted orally.
2. The comparative study of folk knowledge and culture.
3. A body of widely accepted but usually specious notions about a place, a group, or an institution.

Intangible culture:

Traditions or living expressions inherited from our ancestors and passed on to our descendants, such as oral traditions, performing arts, social practices, rituals, festive events, knowledge and practices concerning nature and the universe or the knowledge and skills to produce traditional crafts.

Traditional cultural expressions (TCEs or TECs), also called 'expressions of folklore':

may include music, dance, art, designs, names, signs and symbols, performances, ceremonies, architectural forms, handicrafts and narratives, or many other artistic or cultural expressions.

== Collections of Australian Folklore ==
Australian folklore is preserved as part of The Australian Register Unesco Memory of the World Program and the Oral History and Folklore collection of the National Library of Australia.

=== Playlore ===
Australian Children's Folklore Collection in Museum Victoria, coordinated by Dr June Factor and Dr Gwenda Davey.

=== Music ===
John Meredith Folklore Collection 1953-1994, held in the National Library of Australia.

Rob and Olya Willis Folklore collection.

O'Connor Collection.

Scott Collection.

Australian Traditional Music Archive.

Australian Folk Songs

=== Dance ===
Various books on folk dancing in Australia

=== Spoken word ===
Warren Fahey Collection.

Australian Fairy Tale Society

== History of Australian folklore collection ==
- 1905 Old Bush Songs by Banjo Paterson
- 1952 Bush Music Club (Sydney)
- 1953 Victorian Folk Lore Society
- 1958 The Australian Legend by Russel Ward
- 1963-1975 Australian Tradition magazine edited by Wendy Lowenstein
- 1964 Folklore Council of Australia
- 1964 Who Wrote the Ballads? by John Manifold
- 1967 Folk Songs of Australia and the men and women who sang them by John Meredith
- 1969 Folklore of the Australian Railwaymen by Patsy Adam-Smith
- 1974-1996 Australian Folk Trust
- 1974 Take Your Partners by Shirley Andrews
- 1979 Australian Folklore Society
- 1987 A Dictionary of Australian Folklore: Lore, Legends, Myths and Traditions by Bill Wannan
- 1987 Folklife: Our Living Heritage report proposed the establishment of a National Folklife Centre. The Centre would ‘provide national focus for action to record, safeguard and promote awareness of Australia’s heritage of folklife’. None of the 51 recommendations were implemented.
- 1987-2018 Australian Folklore journal
- 1993 The Oxford Companion to Australian Folklore edited by Graham Seal and Gwenda Bede Davey.
- 2002 Australian Folklore Network established by Professor Graham Seal

=== Ongoing research into Australian folklore ===
Universities teaching intangible culture –

- Curtin University: Australian Folklore Research Unit
- Deakin University: Intangible Cultural Heritage

The Australian Folklore Network holds an annual conference, the day before the National Folk Festival in Canberra each Easter.

The National Library of Australia sponsors an annual National Folk Fellowship.

== Australian Aboriginal mythology ==
- Baijini – Unknown race mentioned in Yolngu folklore.
- Bora – Sacred Aboriginal initiation ceremony. Many sites still exist throughout Australia.
- Bunyip – According to legend, they are said to lurk in swamps, billabongs, creeks, riverbeds, and waterholes.
- Dreamtime – The Dreamtime to Aboriginal Australians is the beginning of time, the creation of knowledge from which their culture began more than 60,000 years ago.

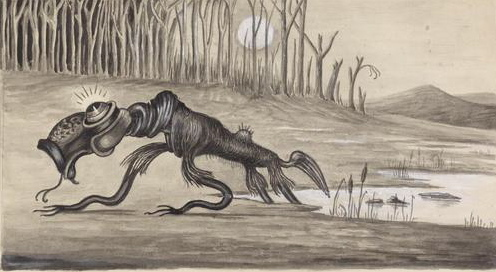
Bunyip (1935), artist unknown, from the National Library of Australia

- Kata Tjuta – Many Dreamtime stories are told by the Pitjantjatjara people, including a mythical creature that lurks the summit.
- Lake Mungo remains – Human skeletons found in 1969, believed to have lived between 40,000 and 68,000 years ago are the oldest human remains found in Australia.
- Rainbow Serpent – It is the sometimes unpredictable Rainbow Serpent, who vies with the ever-reliable Sun, that replenishes the stores of water, forming gullies and deep channels as it slithered across the landscape, allowing for the collection and distribution of water.
- Yara-ma-yha-who – According to Myth, the creature resembles a red frog-like creature that hides in trees waiting for an unsuspecting victim to consume.

== Animals and creatures ==
- Bob the Railway Dog – A Dog that was remembered for traveling along the South Australian Railway.
- Booie Monster – Reports of a monster lurking in a cave first reported in the 1950s
- Drop bear – Stories of drop bears are frequently related to visiting tourists as a joke. (see also the Queensland tiger)

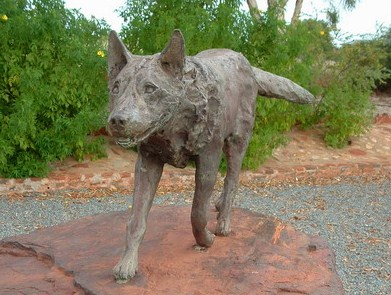
Red Dog statue.

- Gippsland phantom cat – An urban legend centred on the idea that when United States soldiers were based in Victoria during WWII, they released cougars into the wild. Consequently, many sightings of big cats have been reported across Gippsland and even in other parts of Australia.
- Hook Island Sea Monster – Gigantic, tadpole-like sea monster, Photographed in Stonehaven Bay, Hook Island, Queensland.
- Megalania – A giant goanna (lizard), generally believed to be extinct. However, there have been numerous reports and rumours of living Megalania in Australia, and occasionally New Guinea, but the only physical evidence that Megalania might still be alive today are plaster casts of possible Megalania footprints made in 1979.
- Platypus – Native Australian animal which is one of only two mammals that lay eggs (the other being the echidna), and one of the few species of venomous mammals. Due to its unique features the scientist who initially discovered and examined the creature thought it was made of several animals sewn together and deemed it to be a hoax.
- Red Dog – A dog that was known for his long travels through Western Australia's Pilbara region.
- Tasmanian tiger – Despite the widely held view that the thylacine (or Tasmanian tiger) became extinct during the 1930s, accounts of alleged sightings in eastern Victoria and parts of Tasmania have persisted to the present day.
- Yowie (cryptid) – In the modern context, the Yowie is the generic (and somewhat affectionate) term for an unidentified hominid reputed to lurk in the Australian wilderness, analogous to the Himalayan Yeti and the North American Bigfoot.
- The Dog on the Tuckerbox – an allegorical bullock driver's dog that loyally guarded the man's tuckerbox until its death. It has been immortalized in both a poem and a statue at Gundagai in southern NSW. By way of explanation – tucker means food – so a tuckerbox is a lunch box.

== Historical events ==
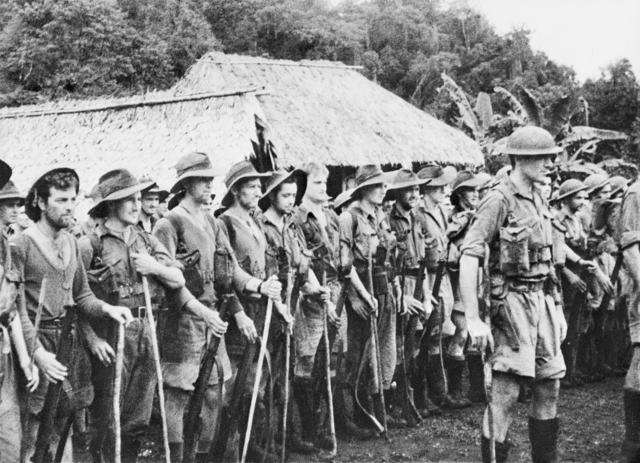
Soldiers of the 39th Battalion in 1942

- Eureka Stockade – A rebellion that took place in Ballarat on 3 December 1854.
- Ancient Coins Marchinbar Island – Nine coins found, some believing they could have come from the Kilwa Sultanate of east Africa which dates back to the 10th century.
- Frontier wars – A much less talked about event in Australian history, a war that spanned 146 years which was fought between mostly British settlers and Aboriginal tribes.
- First Fleet – Name given to the 11 ships that departed England in 1787, with convicts, officers and free settlers to found what became the first European settlement in Australia, Sydney.
- Frederick escape – A ship hijacked by Australian convicts and used to sail to Chile in 1834.
- Lachlan Gold Escort robbery – One of the largest ever gold robberies in Australian history. Led by outlaw Ben Hall & Frank Gardiner, Most of the gold was recovered, but some still search the area for treasure. Would equate to about A$13 million in today's value.
- Nelson robbery - One of the biggest robberies during the Victorian gold rush, in which 8,183 ounces of gold were taken at gunpoint.
- Kokoda Track campaign - Battles fought in 1942 in what was then the Australian Territory of Papua with Australian and United States forces defeating the Japanese who directly threatened the security of Australia and is considered part of the ANZAC legend.
- Portuguese discovery of Australia – A much disputed theory that claims early Portuguese navigators were the first Europeans to sight Australia between 1521 and 1524, well before the arrival of Dutch navigator Willem Janszoon in 1606.

== Art, film, music and literature ==
- Bush ballad – Poems that usually depict Australian life in the outback or bush.
- Clancy of the Overflow – A poem by Banjo Paterson which admires the Outback.
- Eternity – A Graffiti tag done more than 500,000 times by Arthur Stace over a 35-year period, of which only 2 original tags remain.
- Foo was here – Popular Graffiti signature during WW1 that was later adopted by Americans during WW2 and called Kilroy was here. Is said to have Influenced modern Street art.

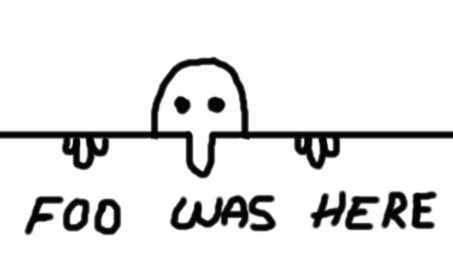
Foo was here graffiti figure

- My Country – More commonly known as "I Love a Sunburnt Country" is a patriotic poem about Australia published in 1908 written by Dorothea Mackellar when she was 19 and homesick living in England.
- The Lucky Country – Is a book by Donald Horne in which the phrase itself was used as sarcasm within the context of the book but has taken place in Australian culture as a true and meaningful title.
- The Story of the Kelly Gang – The world's first full-length film. Made in 1906, it ran for more than an hour; it is, however, considered a Lost film, as only 20 minutes of the original film still exist.
- Rod Ansell – Outback Australian who became the inspiration for the famous film Crocodile Dundee.
- Streets of Forbes – Folk song about iconic Bushranger Ben Hall.
- Waltzing Matilda – Extensive folklore surrounds the song and the process of its creation, to the extent that the song has its own museum in Winton, Queensland

== People ==
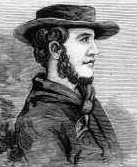
John Batman

- John Batman – 19th century pioneer, controversial with how he dealt with Indigenous Australians, but nevertheless signed a peaceful agreement with the Wurundjeri known as Batman's Treaty which would eventuality lead to the Foundation of Melbourne

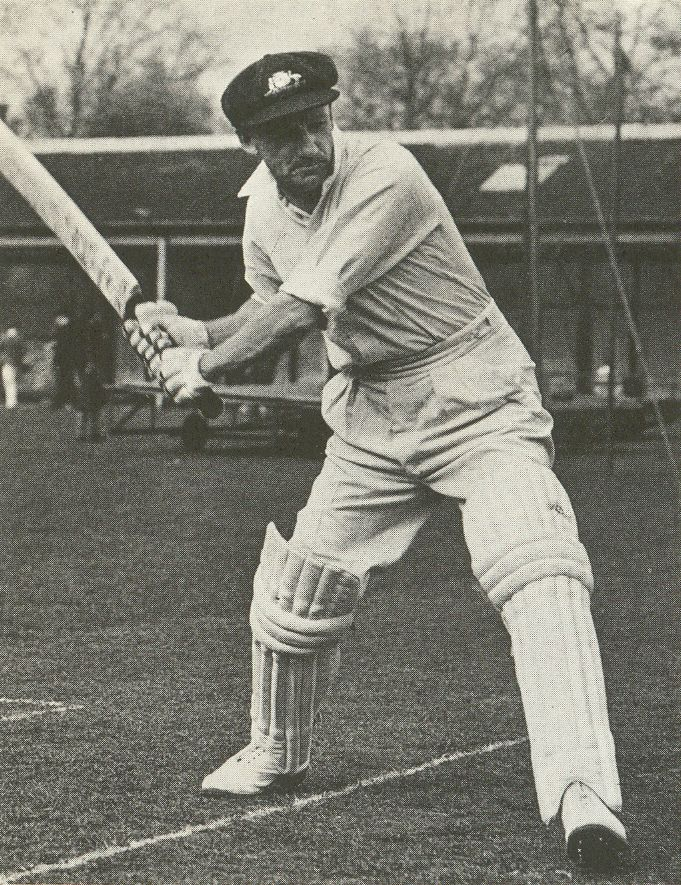
Don Bradman

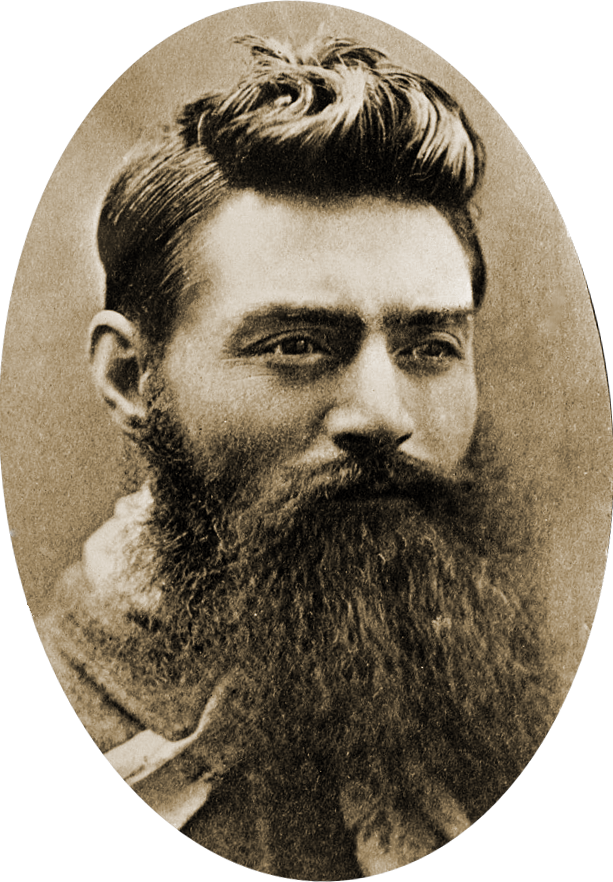
Ned Kelly

- Don Bradman – one of the most renowned cricketers in history, Bradman faced a unique and unexpected conclusion to his illustrious career. Requiring just 4 runs in his final innings to achieve a remarkable test average of 100, he was surprisingly bowled for a duck, leaving him with an average of 99.94. This captivating episode has ingrained itself in Australian folklore, contributing significantly to the mystique surrounding his legacy. It is worth noting that there are unsubstantiated rumours suggesting that he may have attained the elusive 4 runs in another match, potentially miscounted in official records.
- William Buckley – Australian convict who escaped and became famous for living in an Aboriginal community for more than thirty years. Believed by many Australians to be the source of the saying "You've got Buckley's Chance".
- Azaria Chamberlain – the name of two-month-old Australian baby who disappeared on the night of 17 August 1980 on a camping trip with her family. Her parents, Lindy Chamberlain and Michael Chamberlain, reported that she had been taken from their tent by a dingo, but they were arrested, tried, and convicted of her murder in 1982. Both were later cleared, and thus the case is best remembered for what was an injustice. The Chamberlains were Seventh-day Adventists and an urban myth had developed that they were required to sacrifice a child as part of their religious beliefs and that the name Azaria meant "sacrifice". These statements are false.
- John Curtin – 14th prime minister of Australia. Led Australia through World War II when the country was threatened by Japanese invasion and was successful but died in office towards the end of the war. He is considered Australia's greatest prime minister.
- Dancing Man – unidentified man dancing in the street in Sydney, Australia, after the end of World War II.
- Errol Flynn – first Australian-born actor to achieve significant fame in Hollywood.
- Dawn Fraser – perhaps the greatest Australian female swimmer of all time. Known for her politically incorrect behaviour or larrikin character as much as her athletic ability, Fraser won eight Olympic medals, including four golds, and six Commonwealth Games gold medals. It was alleged that she took the flag from Emperor Hirohito's palace, while this was proved false, the incident became part of the folklore.
- Lennie Gwyther – 9-year-old boy famous for traveling more than 1000 km on horseback from his home in Leongatha to see the opening of the Sydney Harbour Bridge in 1932.
- Ben Hall - an Australian bushranger and leading member of the Gardiner–Hall gang. He and his associates carried out many raids across New South Wales, from Bathurst to Forbes, south to Gundagai and east to Goulburn. Unlike many bushrangers of the era, Hall was not directly responsible for any deaths, although several of his associates were. He was shot dead by police in May 1865 at Goobang Creek. The police claimed that they were acting under the protection of the Felons Apprehension Act 1865 which allowed any bushranger who had been specifically named under the terms of the Act to be shot and killed by any person at any time without warning. At the time of Hall's death, the Act had not yet come into force, resulting in considerable controversy over the legality of his killing. Hall is a prominent figure in Australian folklore, inspiring many bush ballads, books and screen works, including the 1975 television series Ben Hall and the 2016 feature film The Legend of Ben Hall.
- Harold Holt – a prime minister who disappeared while swimming in 1967. Conspiracy theories include Holt being picked up by a Chinese submarine, faking his own death, suicide, and CIA involvement. Formal investigations determined that he drowned accidentally. The expression "Like leaving the (porch) light on for Harold Holt" means to have a misplaced hope for an event to happen when the reality is that the event (Holt's having actually survived and being discovered still alive) is never likely to ever happen.
- Ned Kelly – Australian 19th-century bushranger, many films, books and artworks have been made about him, possibly his exploits have been exaggerated in the public eye and become something of folklore. It especially surrounds his capture at Glenrowan where the Kelly gang tried to derail a train of Victorian police which were arriving, and were surrounded in the hotel. Kelly had made armour from stolen iron mould boards of ploughs, and came out shooting, whereupon he was shot in the legs. Some consider him as Australia's Robin Hood whiles others would disagree.

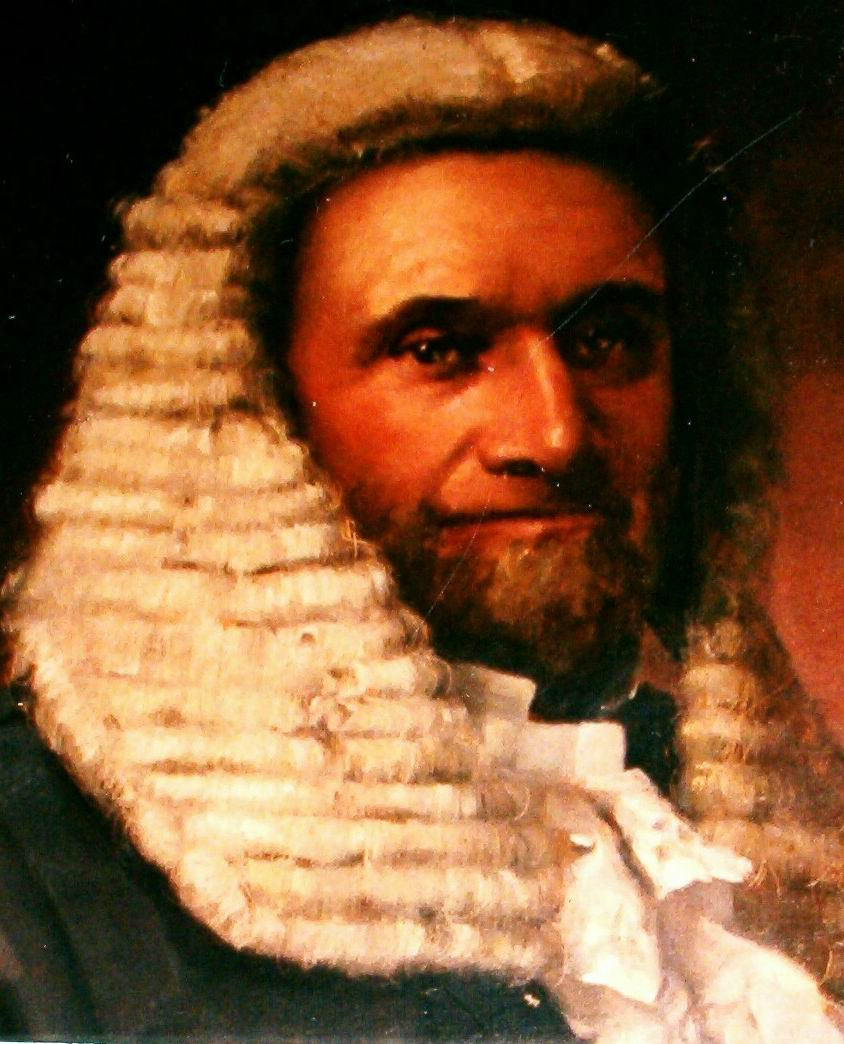
Peter Lalor

- Peter Lalor – an Irish-Australian rebel in the Eureka Stockade who later became the only outlaw to make it to parliament.
- Wally Lewis – legendary rugby league player, captained the Queensland rugby league team in The State of Origin series a record 30 times.
- Eddie Mabo – challenged the Australian Government as to who owned the island of Mer where he was born and lived. He believed the land belonged to the Indigenous peoples of the Torres Strait Islands. He challenged the first court case to win in the High Court on 3 June 1992 – but sadly did not live to see his victory.
- Mary MacKillop – Australia's first saint, responsible for miracles such as curing a woman of leukemia after her family prayed for it.

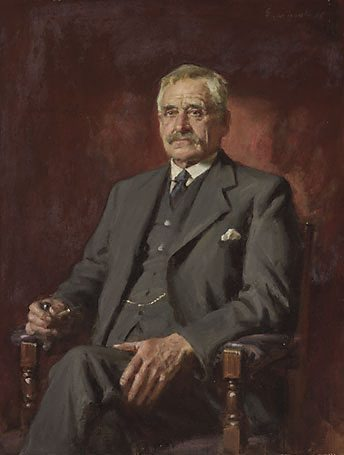
John Longstaff's portrait of Banjo Paterson

- Dame Nellie Melba – an Australian opera soprano, the first Australian to achieve international recognition in the form. The French dessert peach Melba is named after her. Many old theatre halls in regional Australia persist with rumours that she once graced their stage, most notably, that of the gold mining town of Gulgong, New South Wales. She is also remembered in the vernacular Australian expression "more comebacks than Nellie Melba", which satirised her seemingly endless series of "retirement" tours in the 1920s.
- Bert Newton – looked upon as the most influential man in the history of Australian television.
- Pintupi Nine – a group of Aboriginals who lived a traditional hunter-gatherer life in the Gibson Desert until they were discovered in 1984, almost 200 years since first colonization.
- Richters family – the last Aboriginals to have lived a traditional hunter-gatherer life. They were found in the Great Victoria Desert in 1986.
- Johnny O'Keefe – Australia's most successful chart performer, with twenty-nine Top 40 hits to his credit in Australia between 1959 and 1974.
- Banjo Paterson – a bush poet who wrote many ballads and poems about Australian life, focusing mainly on the rural and outback areas of the country. Is widely considered Australia's greatest writer.
- Pemulwuy – an Aboriginal rebel who fought against the British during the 18th and early 19th centuries, believed to have impossibly escaped from capture on countless occasions.
- Simpson and his Donkey – Soldier who is part of the ANZAC legend. During the Gallipoli Campaign at ANZAC Cove Simpson would help rescue Australian Soldiers and take them to safety.
- Squizzy Taylor – a petty criminal turned gangster from Melbourne. He is believed to have constructed a series of tunnels throughout the inner suburbs of Fitzroy and Collingwood.
- White woman of Gippsland – a European woman who was allegedly held captive by Aboriginals against her will in the 1840s, although her existence has been debated.
- Yagan – aboriginal warrior who fought against British settlement but was captured, in what is now Perth, Western Australia.
- Cliff Young — potato farmer who won the 1981 Sydney-to-Melbourne ultramarathon at age 61 because he didn't realize the other runners would be stopping to sleep.

== Places and structures ==
- Finke River – "Oldest river in the world", a claim that has been attributed to "scientists" by a generation of central Australian bus drivers and tour brochure writers. Parts of the Finke River are likely the oldest major river known in the world or among the oldest, as shown in scientific literature, but this does not apply to the southern part of the river. Neighboring, smaller rivers are just as old.

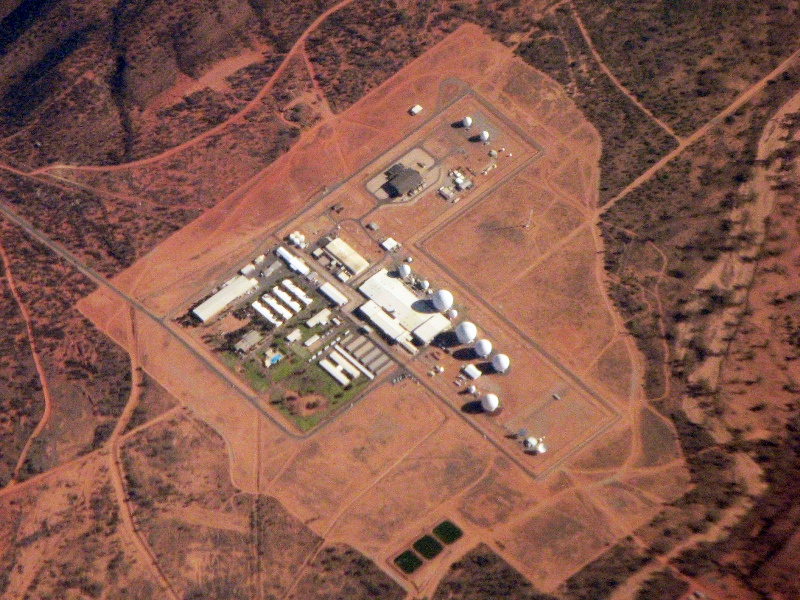
Pine Gap in The Northern Territory

- Franklin House – Historic house in Launceston that has had reports of ghost sightings.
- Gallipoli – the name of a peninsula in Turkey, but also the name given to the Allied campaign on that peninsula during World War I. There were around 180,000 Allied casualties and 220,000 Turkish casualties. This campaign has become a "founding myth" for both Australia and New Zealand, and ANZAC Day is still commemorated as a holiday in both countries. The idea that Australian soldiers were mowed down by Turkish gunfire following stupid decisions of the British commanding officers is part of the folklore, as is the escape from Gallipoli, where the ANZACs used rifles rigged to fire by water dripped into a pan attached to the trigger to make it seem like there were still soldiers in the trenches as they were leaving. Another aspect of the ANZAC spirit is the story of Simpson and his donkey.
- Gentle Annie – Name for selected especially steep sections of bush roads, difficult to climb in wet weather. The folk term may have arisen as early as in bullock team days, whether drawing wagons or timber jinkers.
- Gympie Pyramid – A small pyramid like structure in Gympie, Queensland (That has been mostly destroyed) that many believe to be a construction made by Chinese or Incan origin. Although researchers would more likely argue that it is a hoax.
- Monte Cristo Homestead – Historic estate in Junee, New South Wales, said to be the most Haunted property in Australia.
- Mount Coot-tha Forest - Historic forest on the slopes of Mount Coot-tha, that has had a long history of paranormal and cryptid sightings.
- Parkes Observatory – Landmark in New South Wales, responsible for helping NASA broadcast the Moon landings to the world.

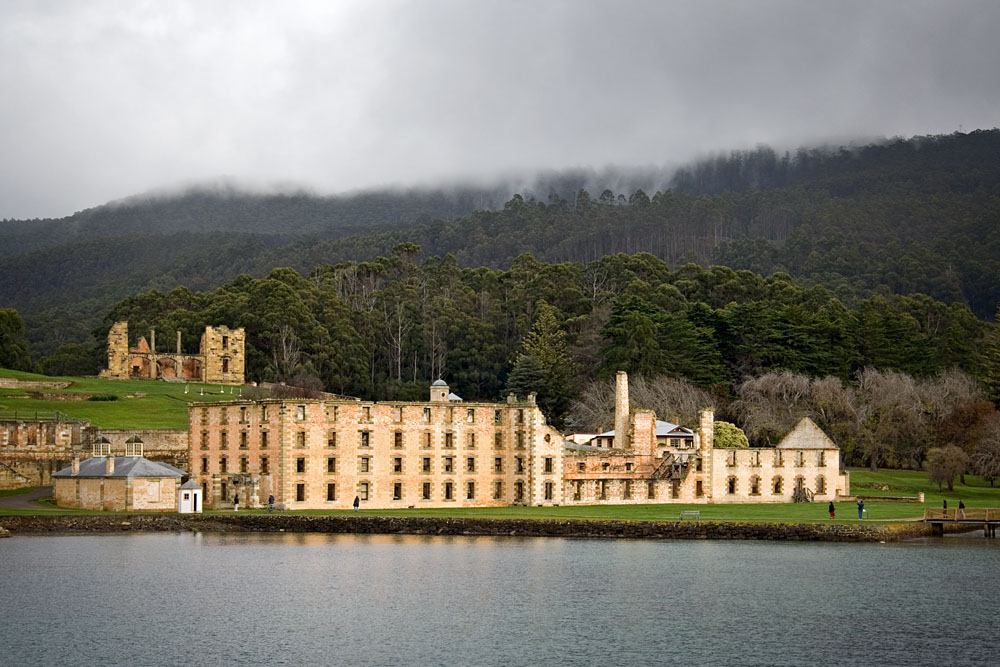
Port Arthur Penitentiary

- Pine Gap – A Government base in Central Australia run by both Australia and the United States. Similar to Area 51.
- Port Arthur, Tasmania – Former convict site, Has a complex and negative past, is said to haunted; But still a tourist attraction in Tasmania, the site of Australia's biggest and most well known mass shootings, the Port Arthur Massacre (Australia).
- Princess Theatre Ghost sightings – One of the oldest theatres in Australia, it is said to be haunted after the death of Frederick Federici.
- Shrine of Remembrance – War memorial in Melbourne built to honour the men and women of Victoria who served in World War I but later dedicated to all Australians who gave their lives in war.
- Sydney–Melbourne rivalry – there has been a long-standing rivalry, usually friendly yet sometimes heated, between the cities of Melbourne and Sydney, the two largest cities in Australia. It was this very rivalry that ultimately acted as the catalyst for the eventual founding of Canberra as the capital city of Australia.

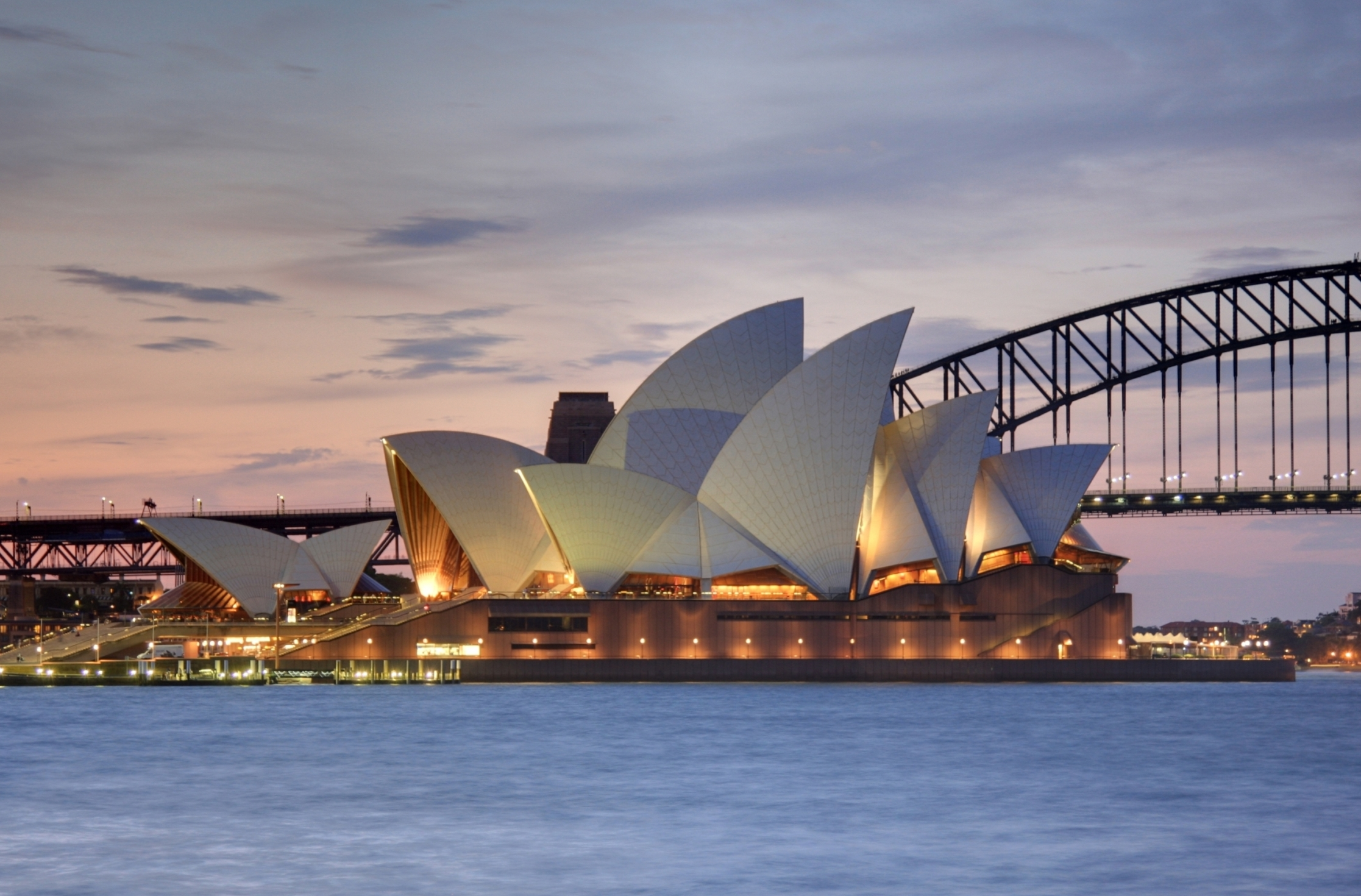
The Opera House, backed by the Sydney Harbour Bridge, seen from the eastern Botanic Gardens

- Snowy River – immortalised in another Banjo Paterson poem, "The Man from Snowy River". The river has received much attention of late for now being nothing more than a trickle, and in fact has become a symbol for wider Australian interest in the health of its great rivers, particularly those in the Murray-Darling basin.
- Sovereign Hill – An Open-Air Museum in Ballarat depicting an 1850s gold rush town.
- St James station tunnels – The tunnel is home to many urban legends including being a secret military bunker during World War II and a large bell that sounds like Big Ben.
- Sydney Harbour Bridge and Sydney Opera House – Two of Australia's most famous national landmarks. Know to people worldwide and cementing Sydney as Australia's global city.
- The Great Barrier Reef – the only landmark in Australia (or Oceania) to be one of the Seven Wonders of the World.
- Uluru – Large sandstone rock formation in central Australia. Has great cultural significance to Aboriginal Australians and is one of Australia's most famous landmarks.
- Westall – biggest UFO sighting in Australian history, what actually was sighted remains a mystery to this day.
- Wiebbe Hayes Stone Fort – Oldest European building in Australia, built in 1629 by survivors of the Batavia shipwreck in which a mutiny took place.

== Socio-political events ==
- Australian constitutional crisis of 1975 – a real political crisis that has since taken on mythic proportions and elevated the protagonists to legendary status (depending on which side of the debate one takes). A visiting American politician at the time wryly observed that he was sure he had only heard the tip of the ice cube. Gough Whitlam's speech "Well may we say God save the Queen, because nothing will save the Governor General" is replayed frequently.

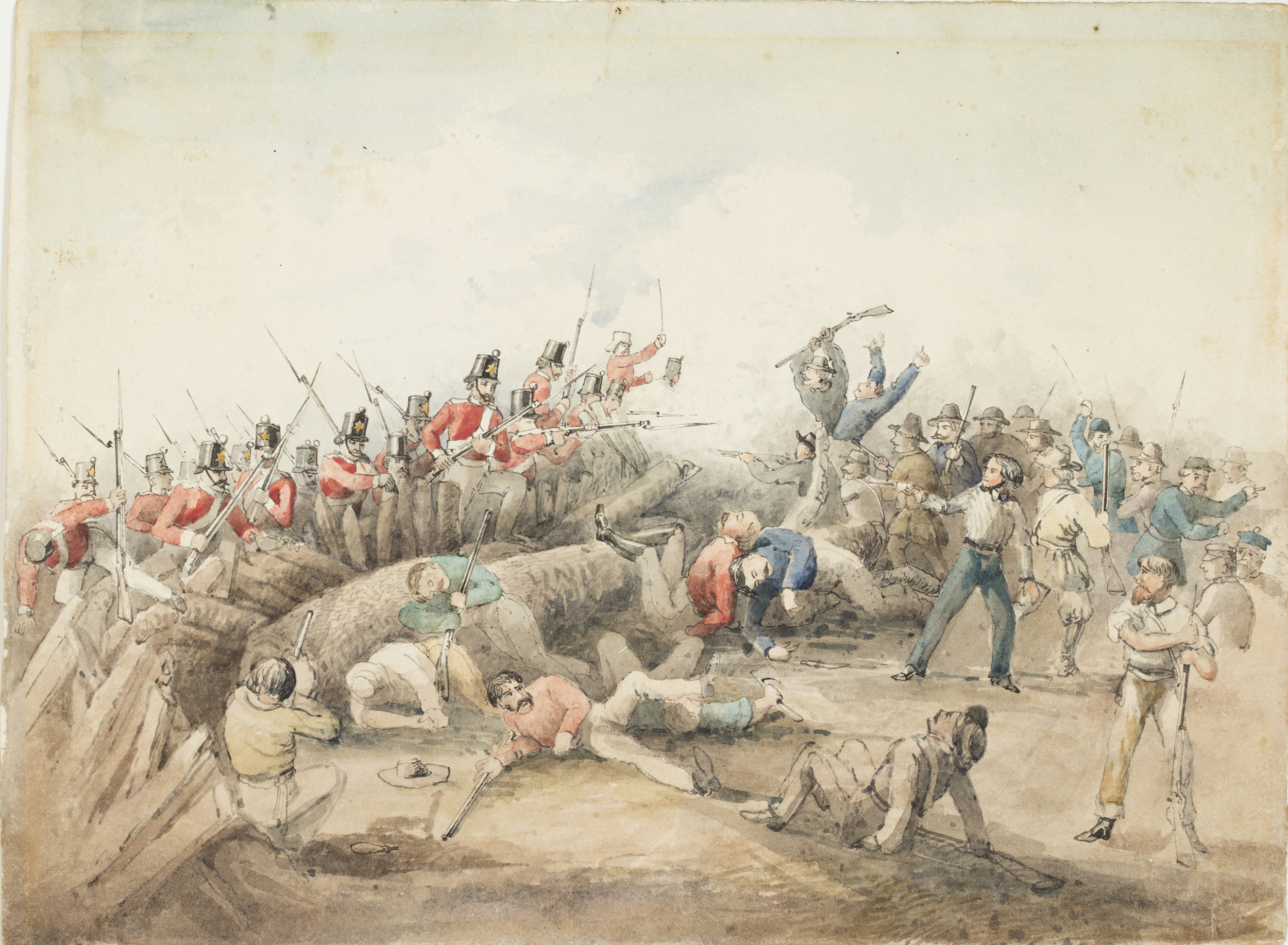
Eureka Stockade battle by J. B. Henderson

- Eureka stockade – A miners' revolt in 1854 in Victoria, Australia against the officials supervising the gold-mining region of Ballarat, in particular, the high prices of digging licenses. It is often regarded as the "Birth of Australian Democracy" and an event of equal significance to Australian history as the storming of the Bastille was to French history, but almost equally often dismissed as being of little or no consequence.
- The Stolen Generation – From the late 1800s to the early 1970s, young Aboriginal people were forcibly removed from their families as children between the 1900s and the 1960s, to be brought up by white foster families or in institutions. In 1999 then-prime minister John Howard avoided using the word "sorry", to the families. In 2008 Kevin Rudd made an official apology to the stolen generation and their families, on behalf of the Australian government.
- Tenterfield Oration – Speech given by Sir Henry Parkes in 1889 calling for the six Australian colonies to be Federated, which would eventually lead to the Commonwealth of Australia.

== Sport ==
- 2000 Sydney Olympics – Hailed as one of the greatest Olympic Games of all time, It captured the imagination of an entire country and gave birth to many Australian sporting moments and icons, including Cathy Freeman, Grant Hackett, Susie O'Neill, and Ian Thorpe.
- Australia II – A 12-metre class yacht that was the first successful challenger for the America's Cup after 132 years. On the morning of the victory (Australian time) the then Australian prime minister, Bob Hawke, famously said that any employer who sacked any of their employees for not coming in that day was a "bum". The challenge also resulted in the popularisation of the boxing kangaroo representation.

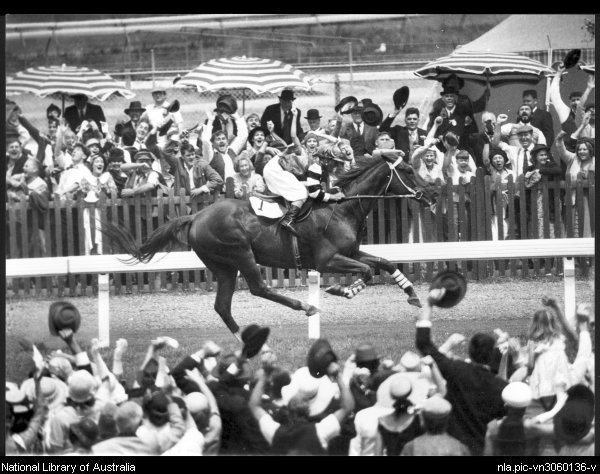
Portrayal of Phar Lap winning the 1930 Melbourne Cup, from the 1983 movie "Phar Lap"

- Colliwobbles – The "Colliwobbles" refers to the Collingwood Football Club's apparent penchant for losing grand finals over a 32-year period between 1958 and 1990. During this premiership drought, fans endured nine fruitless grand finals (1960, 1964, 1966, 1970, 1977 (drawn, then lost in a replay the following week), 1979, 1980, 1981). The term "Colliwobbles" was to enter the Victorian vocabulary to signify a choking phenomenon.
- The Invincibles – First Test match side to play an entire tour of England without losing, and is often considered to be one of the greatest cricket teams of all time.
- Kennett curse – A 5-year winning streak Geelong had over Hawthorn over comments made by then Hawthorn club president Jeff Kennett saying that Geelong does not have the mental drive to defeat Hawthorn. Most games were decided by ten points or less and are considered some of the best in recent memory.
- Phar Lap – A thoroughbred horse who is considered by many to be the world's greatest racehorse, and is probably subject to more conspiracy theories than any other racehorse (in relation to the cause of his death). His name entered the Australian lexicon in the expression "to have a heart bigger than Phar Lap's", referring to someone's tenacity and courage. It is part of Australian folklore that Phar Lap's heart was physically twice the size of the average horse's heart.
- Super League war – A dispute between the Packer and Murdoch families over control of the top-level Rugby League competition in Australia in the mid-1990s.
- Steven Bradbury – An Australian short-track speed skater who memorably won gold at the 2002 Winter Olympics at the 1,000 m short track, going from last to first after all other skaters were involved in a pile-up during the final metres. This led to the phrase 'doing a Bradbury', meaning to achieve something with the odds stacked against you.

== Other ==
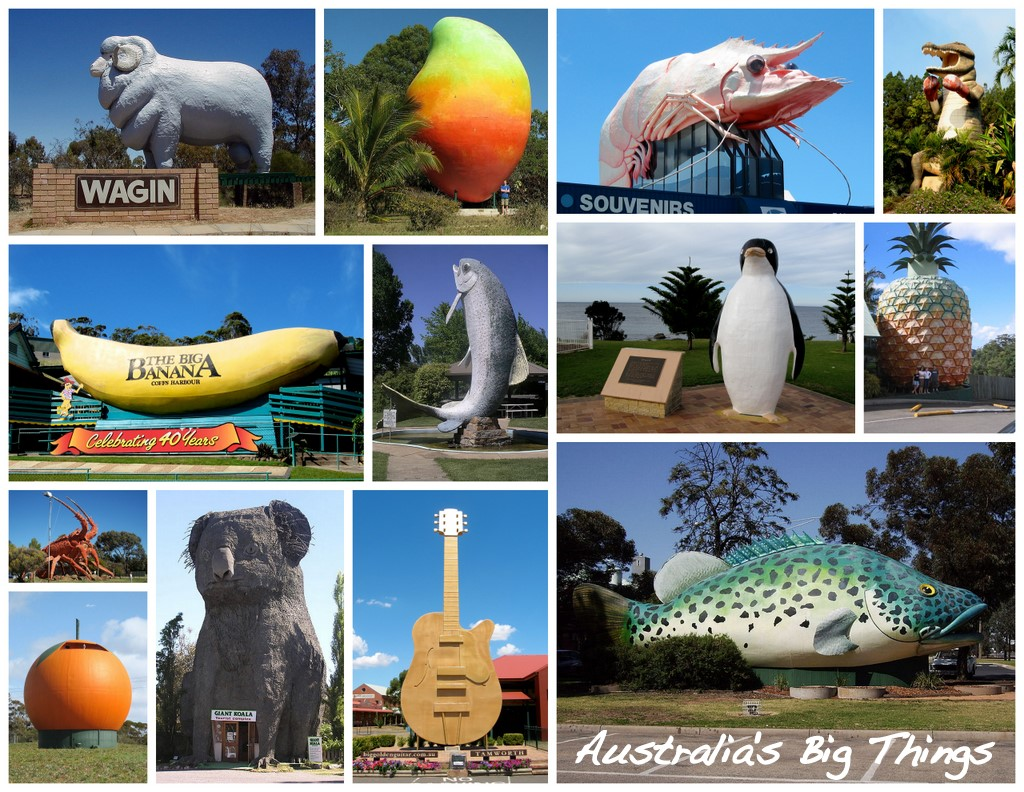
A selection of Australia's big things

- 5 o'clock wave – Supposedly a large wave, several metres in height and created by the daily release of dam overflow, that is said to travel downriver at high speed, and to reach the location at which the tale is being told at 5 o'clock each afternoon.
- ANZAC spirit – Idea shared by Australian & New Zealand soldiers during WW1 which has contributed to the "National Character" of both countries, and embodies the cultural idiom of Mateship.
- Akubra – Wide-brimmed hat made famous by outlaws and soldiers.
- Big Things – Many Australian towns are known for their large and sometimes unusual structures or sculptures.
- Bass Strait Triangle – Similar to the Bermuda Triangle, the Bass Strait Triangle which lies between the states of Victoria and Tasmania has been known to cause mysterious aviation and marine incidents, most notably the Valentich Disappearance.
- Battle between HMAS Sydney and Kormoran – Suspicion, and even a cover-up, has been discussed regarding how the warship was defeated by a modified merchant vessel like Kormoran.
- Drover – Australian livestock movers known for their hard work in the outback of Australia.
- Fisher's ghost – Popular early 19th century ghost story about a man who suddenly disappeared in Campbelltown, New South Wales, but his ghost can be seen sitting on a fence.
- Geelong Keys – A set of keys discovered in 1845 or 1846 by Governor Charles La Trobe at Corio Bay in Victoria, Australia which have led some people to believe they may have belonged to the Portuguese.

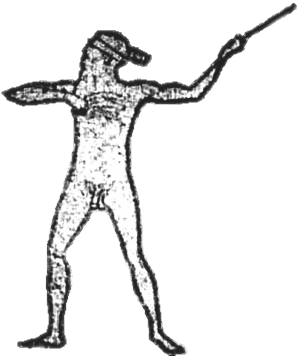
The Marree Man

- Gosford glyphs – Egyptian hieroglyphs that are carved into two parallel sandstone walls. Found in 1975 by a local surveyor, it is debated whether they are authentic or not.
- Jack the Ripper in Australia – Frederick Bailey Deeming an English born Australian man was once thought to have been the infamous Jack the Ripper living in Melbourne.
- Lasseter's Reef – A fabulously rich gold deposit said to have been discovered – and then subsequently lost – by bushman Harold Bell Lasseter in a remote and desolate corner of central Australia towards the end of the 19th century.

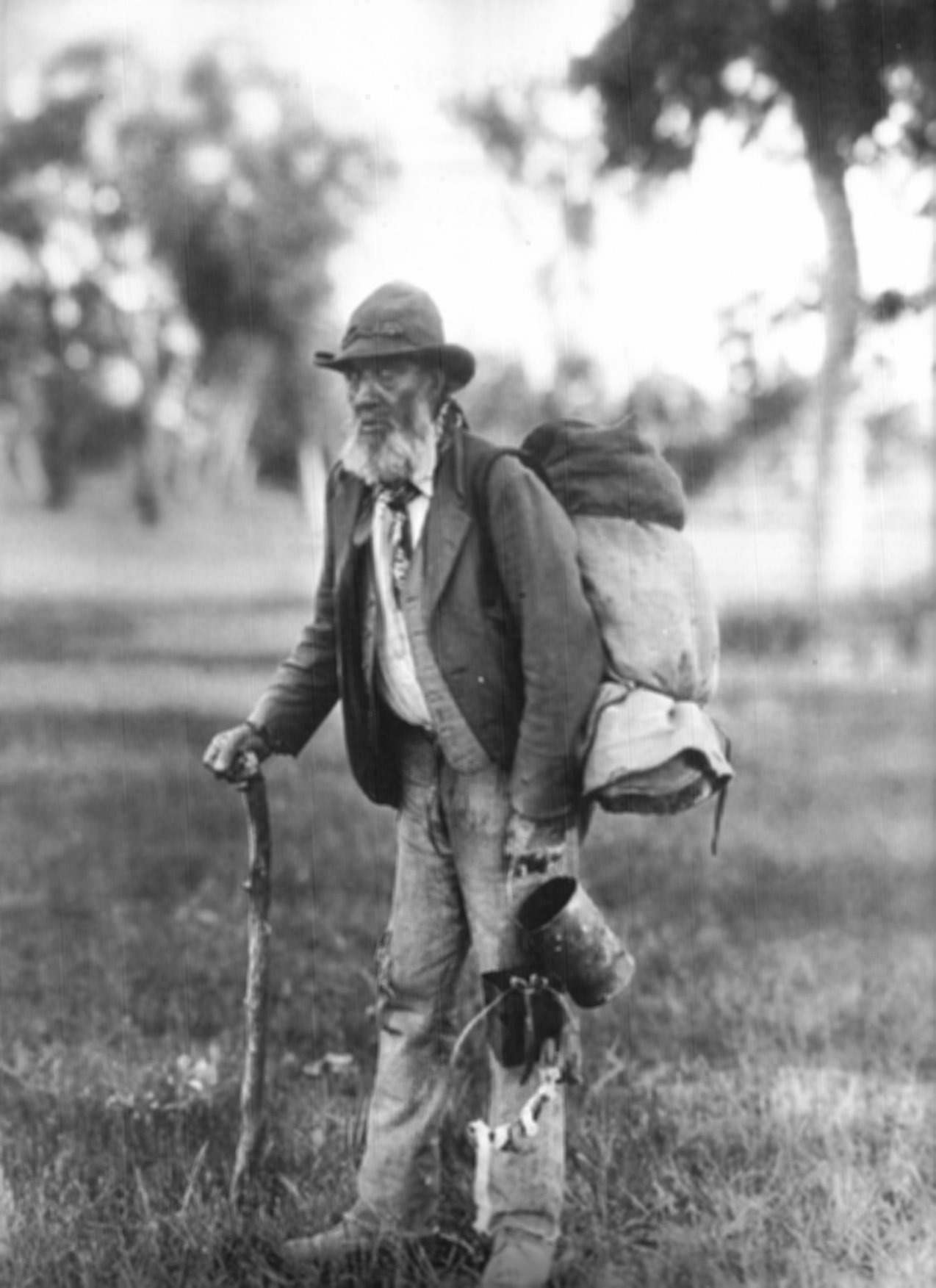
Photograph of a swagman, 1901

- Mahogany Ship – A supposed wrecked Portuguese caravel which is purported to lie beneath the sand approximately six miles west of Warrnambool in southwest Victoria, Australia.
- Marree Man – A large modern geoglyph, created using an agricultural plough, first noted by air in 1998 near Marree in South Australia. The Marree Hotel publican and other locals restored the outline using a plough in August 2016 after it had all but disappeared into the sand.
- Min Min light – An unexplained light seen in central Australia.
- Mullumbimby Stonehenge – Ancient stone arrangement, which dates back to the Paleolithic age. The location remains unknown to the Australian public due to fears of theft and further destruction.
- Nullarbor Nymph – A hoax and legend in 1971 and 1972 in Australia which grew from the supposed sighting of a half naked woman on the Nullarbor Plain living amongst some kangaroos.
- Rex Gilroy – One of Australia's most famous Cryptozoologists.
- The Speewah – A mythical Australian station that is the subject of many tall tales told by Australian bushmen.
- Swagman – Vagabond who travelled by foot to different locations looking for work carrying his belongings, seen as a folk hero in 19th-century Australia.
- Tamam Shud case – In 1948 an unidentified man was found dead at a beach in Adelaide, South Australia. The case involves an encrypted message and is considered "one of Australia's most profound mysteries". The case is unsolved and remains open to this day.
- Toyota Land Cruiser – 4WD Vehicle that was originally used to help build the Snowy Mountains Hydro-Electric Scheme. Often considered to be Australia's Greatest off-road vehicle. Especially the 80 Series of the 1990s.
- Thomas Welsby Clark – Body of a Deceased man that was found at sea near the shores of Christmas Island, which is 1,550 kilometres from Australia's closest point, who was a sailor from HMAS Sydney only body found from sinking of ship with all hands on deck.

== See also ==
- Australian Aboriginal religion and mythology
- Culture of Australia
- History of Australia
- Honest history
