= Australian ufology =

Study of UFOs in Australia

Australian ufology refers to a historical series of Australian events and or activities pertaining to government departments, civilian groups or individual Australians, which centre on or around the study of Unidentified Flying Object (UFO) reports, sightings, encounters and other related phenomena, known as ufology within the Australian context before 1984.

== History ==
Early reports about UFOs in and around Australia date back prior to 1947. However, the Kenneth Arnold case (June 1947) and the Roswell UFO incident (July 1947) became international press items and appeared in Australian newspapers.

=== 1940s ===
The first gathering of UFO enthusiasts occurred in Melbourne in March 1949 at the Federal Government's newly established Aeronautical Research Laboratory (ARL). The minutes of the non-government meeting show an attendance of 23 enthusiasts from various state and local groups such as the British Interplanetary Society, Royal Aeronautical Society (RAS), Commonwealth Aircraft Corporation (CAC), Royal Australian Air Force (RAAF) and the Army Research Establishment. By May 1949, this gathering of enthusiasts became known as Aeronautical & Meteorological Phenomena Research (AMPR) led by Brian Boyle and Jack Seers. AMPR started to list and research UFO stories and produced a small quarterly publication called Interplanetary Saucer.

=== 1950s ===
This cover comes from the 6th edition of the Australian Flying Saucer Bureau (AFSB) publication called the Australian Flying Saucer Magazine. Six were produced from May 1953 to Feb 1955. – No 6, February 1955, 8 pages, 21 cm x 28 cm – image source PRA Melbourne.

AMPR's workload increased as the world ran into its next major sightings flap. In 1951 AMPR became Aeronautics & Phenomena Research Victoria (APRV).

In May 1952, R. M. Seymour, Superintendent of the Federal Civil Aviation Department, Air Traffic Control Branch Melbourne, reported that Australian Intelligence officers had refused his Department permission to investigate flying saucer reports on the grounds that UFOs were "security matters".

In July 1952, Edgar Jarrold founded the Australian Flying Saucer Bureau (AFSB) in Sydney. Its headquarters were in Fairfield. AFSB began publishing the Australian Flying Saucer Magazine in May 1953.

At some point, the APRV made contact with Jarrold and agreed that the AFSB and APRV would assist each other when possible. The APRV nominated John. M. Anderson as their AFSB liaison on the condition that his appointment was seen only as being neutral, and there would be no branch affiliation with AFSB. Apparently Jarrold was seen by APRV as a secretive "loose gun" but both groups maintained an average working relationship.

AMPR decided on 6 February 1953 to form an auxiliary group called the Australian Flying Saucer Investigating Committee (AFSIC) in partnership with the Astronomical Society of Victoria (ASV).

Such was the interest in UFOs during the period that on 20 November 1953, Alexander Downer, the member for the Federal Division of Angas, enquired during Question Time in the House of Representatives about whether the RAAF was investigating the UFO phenomenon. The then Minister for Air, William McMahon (later Prime Minister) replied that the saucers were a problem "more for psychologists than for defence authorities".

In July 1954, AFSIC released a study of 55 sightings.

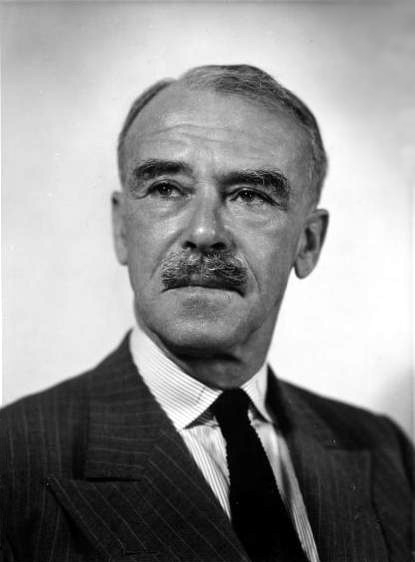
Baron Casey

The flying saucer topic came under intense criticism. Public support for the continuation of investigation into the UFO phenomenon was driven by newspaper coverage of the 1954 sightings. Then-Federal Minister for External Affairs and Minister in charge of the Commonwealth Scientific and Industrial Research Organisation Richard Casey wrote a letter to The Advertiser newspaper (Adelaide) which was published on 30 January 1954. The clipping included this:

I have lists of the dates over the last several years on which people have reported having seen 'flying saucers' in Australia and have compared them with the dates on which the earth passes through the principal (sic) meteoric showers. There appears to be a noticeable relationship between these two sets of dates.

— R. G. Casey, Minister for External Affairs

Baron Casey was a member of APRV. His time as Minister in charge of the CSIRO and as Minister for External Affairs enabled him to act as a conduit between governmental research, the public, and public enthusiast clubs. Casey’s curiosity on the subject related to UFOs remained with him until his death in June 1976.

In March 1954 Jarrold was contacted by a South Australian called Fred Stone. Stone agreed to form a branch of Jarrold’s group and so the AFSB (SA) was formed. However, this relationship was fragile and as Jarrold's behaviour changed due to stress the relationship deteriorated. The RAAF also noted problems with Jarrold. Sq Leader A.H. Birch, AFC, Air Force Headquarters, Victoria Barracks, Victoria, made note of this in a letter dated 5 April 1955: "...the discussion during the brief interview I had with Mr. Jarrold mainly concerned the possibility of his Society causing embarrassment to the Royal Australian Air Force."

The RAAF then changed their policy and shifted their help to other organisations within Australia. "The Director would be happy to extend this service to your Society also." After Sq/Ld Birch meeting with Edger Jarrold's UFO group AFSB collapsed (in February 1955), in just under four years, Jarrold departed the active UFO scene for good, only to appear on rare occasions.

After this, a new state group emerged. The most prominent and first to re-build was under the directorship of Fred Stone, who formed the Australian Flying Saucer Research Society (AFSRS) based in Adelaide, South Australia in February 1955. Stone also saw a chance to become the governing body of all Australian Ufology. He asked APRV to come under his plan; they rejected the concept. However, APRV agreed to extend the same relationship they extended to Jarrold's group with John. M. Anderson as their contact. This arrangement was agreed to and APRV supplied a list of contacts for Stone on possible branch organisers. Stone's plan was to form three new state groups (Victoria, NSW, and Queensland) under his control. With a new members list Stone set his plan into motion. Although each new group developed due to individuals within these groups, in the end Stone had little input into the other two state groups' structure. His concept worked at first but soon ran into administration problems due to distance between states and distant lines of communication.

In April 1956 to deal with an increase in reports the Aeronautics & Phenomena Research Victoria (APRV) changed their structure and name to Phenomena Research Victoria (PRV).

In November 1957 an upwelling of public interest produced the formation of new groups around Australia. The majority of these new state groups did not accept Fred Stone's 1955 plan; those who accepted it only lasted one year before they decided to operate under their own administration. In late 1957 a new group started in Sydney called the Northern Suburbs Flying Saucer Research Association (NSFSRA), established under Mr & Mrs D. Moore.

Queensland members called for an independent structure and went their own way. They formed the Queensland Flying Saucer Research Bureau (QFSRB), now known as UFO Research Queensland (UFORQld), formed under Charles Middleborough in 1956 and with Stan Seers from 1957. These new groups were infiltrated and members came under the watchful eye of the Australian Security Intelligence Organisation (ASIO), as seen in a report dated 4 August 1959. Dossiers and comments on Stan Seers and QFSRB members were produced for the ASIO Regional Director.

However, in Victoria the Australian Flying Saucer Research Society (Victorian Branch) (AFSRS Vic), now known as the Victorian UFO Research Society (VUFORS), under Peter E. Norris LL.B and John Pinkney, was formed on 17 February 1957 at Melbourne University. In the first months of 1957 it was a branch of the Australian Flying Saucer Research Society (AFSRS) but later that year it also became independent and was re-organised as the Victorian Flying Saucer Research Society (VFSRS).

At this time the Australian Flying Saucer Research Society (NSW Branch) (AFSRS NSW) was formed. This branch followed Victoria's lead and decided to become independent from Fred Stone's South Australia group AFSRS. The NSW membership decided to again change their structure and name and thus became the UFO Investigation Centre (UFOIC) under Dr. W.P. Clifford 1957.

UFOIC's start was overshadowed by a large, more active Sydney group, the Northern Suburbs Flying Saucer Research Association. The two Sydney groups competed for members and soon the relationship between the two broke down. NSFSRA became the central NSW group, primarily due to their public support and hosting of George Adamski on his 1959 Australian visit, organised by Victorian and Queensland Groups. Adamski held his Sydney lecture at Adyar Hall on 27 February 1959. Adamski's visit resulted in UFOIC membership falling away dramatically until it was basically a small, close-knit group of enthusiasts. So bitter was the dispute, UFOIC President Dr. Greenwell resigned in disgust; this opened the position to Dr Miran Lindtner who became president in March 1959. The damage had been done and the Sydney experience scared the NSW UFO community.

=== 1960s ===
The Australian space industry was in full swing and slowly, research facilities that were based in Victoria moved to South Australia and the Woomera Rocket Range. These departmental changes started to affect the administration and membership of PRV. To keep up with the changing world, in 1961, the old AMPR again changed their structure and name from Phenomena Research Victoria (PRV) to Phenomena Research Australia (PRA).

On 27 February 1965, in the country town of Ballarat, Victoria, Australia held its first UFO group congregation. The conference was arranged by W. Howard Sloane, of the Ballarat Astronomical Society. The RAAF was represented by B.G. Roberts, a senior research scientist with the Operational Research Office (ORO), Department of Air, Canberra and two RAAF officers to look after a display. Air Marshal Sir George Jones (who had an interest in UFOs) also attended. Keynote speakers, including the Rev. William Gill and Charles Brew, gave accounts of their very public UFO experiences. At the conference, a new public group structure was named Commonwealth Aerial Phenomena Investigation Organisation (CAPIO). The assembly voted it into existence, and out of proceedings lawyer Peter E. Norris LL.B (Melb) became CAPIO's first President, under the patronage of Air Marshal Sir George Jones.

October 1965, after setup delays, the Tasmania UFO Investigation Centre (TUFOIC) was founded under Keith Roberts and Paul Jackson.

In 1966, a new group based at Woomera was set up called the Scientific Technical and Astronomical Research Society. This group of scientific and technical personnel collected UFO reports from the Woomera rocket range and local area. With the demise of the British and Australian rocket program, the group was disbanded in 1968.

On 12 October 1966, the Department of Air wrote to the CSIRO advising that "Sighting of Unidentified Flying Objects have during recent months been receiving considerable publicity... it is important that the system of investigation should make the best use of resources available in Australia." The DOA invited the CSIRO to comment on specific UFO cases to be sent to them by the RAAF. The minutes of the 92nd meeting of the CSIRO executive committee on 25 October 1966 (See para 10 revealed that the CSIRO agreed to the DOA’s request. They responded on 7 November 1966, "The organisation is quite happy to assist in this way... and to provide you with comments."

==== State collaboration fractures ====
For years, there was a general underground friction or competitiveness between groups, focused primary on Victorian groups. Norris and his group VFSRS pressed the need for an active government research input and created the linking opportunities with various government bodies for this process. A document to ASIO quotes AFSRS President Fred Stone as lacking trust in the Victorian group and reported that they were associated with a Sydney UFO Group that was controlled by people with "Pink" tendencies.

By 1963, the South Australian group was finished, which led to a push from Sydney to take control of the state group's magazine. On 23 February 1967, UFOIC V/Pres Mr. Harry O’Brian made an application for copyright on the state group's magazine Australian Flying Saucer Review. Victoria and Queensland protested, the application failed, and VFSRS closed the door on Sydney. UFOIC continued publishing a newsletter from 1964 until late 1979.

In 1968, the Victorian Flying Saucer Research Society (VFSRS) was re-organised and its name was again altered – this time to the Victorian U.F.O. Research Society (VUFORS).

CASE 1	1966 6 April	Westall High School UFO, Victoria

On 26 June 1968, in a letter from the Australian Governments Department of External Affairs to the Secretary Prime Minister's Department, the following policy observations are recorded: "...the history of this subject reveals that the more time and effort that is spent by experienced scientists in investigating the smaller becomes the residue of unexplained phenomena... in spite of these difficulties the Australian Government continue to keep records of "sighting" and associated phenomena reported within Australian and associated territories."

By 1969, Phenomena Research Australia (PRA) changed their policy and opened limited membership to the general public with a new newsletter called UFO And Phenomena.

=== 1970s ===
In late 1970, Tasmania UFO Investigation Centre (TUFOIC) produced the Tasmanian UFO Report, later TUFOIC Newsletter, a magazine that covered 86 issues (1970 to 1999).

On 30 October 1971, a symposium was held in Adelaide. The symposium, on UFOs, was organised by the SA Division of the Australian and New Zealand Association for the Advancement of Science.

Victorian groups VUFORS and PRA invited Dr. J. Allen Hynek to visit Australia. He accepted the invitation and in 1973 arrived in Australia, spending four days in Melbourne, followed by short stops in Sydney, ACT, Brisbane and Papua New Guinea. While in Victoria, Dr. Hynek also met with Rev. William Gill, who was involved in the famous "close encounters of the third kind" case that occurred in the Anglican mission village at Boianai, Papua, New Guinea,. He also journeyed to Papua, which enabled him to undertake a detailed on site investigation into this famous case. Victorian members of VUFORS and PRA arranged that, during his stay in the ACT, he was able to talk with Shamus O'Farrell, discussing O'Farrell's famous 1954 Sea Fury incident.

In 1974, Harry Griesberg and David Seargent established the Australian Co-ordination Section (ACOS) of the US-based Center for UFO Studies (CUFOS). This followed the 1973 visit to Australia of Dr J. Allen Hynek, who requested that Australian ufologists forward copies of interesting Australian sighting reports to CUFOS in the US.

In 1978, VUFORS changed direction following the resignation of Peter Norris. A new executive was placed in control, ensuring the continuing prosperity of VUFORS. By 1978 VUFORS had the largest membership of any UFO organisation in the Southern Hemisphere.

==== Defence UFO files open ====
Although the UFO files were available to Defence personnel and Civilians Defence personnel for years, these files remained closed to outside researchers. In October 1979, extensively through the efforts of VUFORS researchers and Fl/Lt Brett Biddington (later Group Captain – RAAF), the RAAF invited Victorian researchers to visit the Intelligence Cell at RAAF Headquarters Support Command, Victoria Barracks, Victoria, to view the majority files collection and copy what they wished. This was a significant 'turn around' by the Defence Force, but it was the start of a period of remarkable co-operation between government departments and civilian groups. It was not until 1981 that another change in policy was instigated. A selection of general UFO files could be sent to Defence HQ, Russell Office, Canberra, when requested. The limited selection became open to other civilians for research after being vetted by a second controlling officer, but after their inspection they were returned to the Victorian collection.

CASE 2	1978 21 October	Pilot Frederick Valentich Disappearance, Victoria

=== 1980s ===
By 1980, ACOS became the Australian Centre for UFO Studies (ACUFOS) by 1985 (to this day) under the control of Dr Martin Gottschall. UFO Research Australia (UFORA) was formed by Vladimir and P Godic. Their first newsletter was published in January 1980 in South Australia.

== Government ==
The structure of Australian Government is in three tiers. The lowest level is Local Council, above that is the State Government and over these sits the Federal Government. Throughout the modern era of Australian ufology, departments of the Federal government have played the major role of official inquisitor. The State Government does play a minor role; however, archival evidence reveals that when a State body gets involved their primary object is to pass the case up to the Federal sphere.

=== Reports ===
RAAF dealt with more than 400 between 1950 and 1959 and over 1,300 reports between 1960 and 1980. The Department of Air produced Unusual Aerial Sightings (UAS) lists for the public. Three such examples are:

- Summary No1 January 60 – Dec 68
- Summary No2 January 69 – Dec 69
- Summary No3 January 71 – Dec 71

These above samples lists are from the West Australian, National Archives of Australia (NAA) files. However, it is known that there are over 10,000 files in over 130 folders on the topic of UFOs or flying saucers located within the NAA 60 million file collection. After 1980, Government UFO reports that were in external departments were culled and then scattered throughout Australia to NAA storage areas, away from their original central point in Victoria.

Archival documents show the following main players in UFO case research or information collection. The list may not show the upper administration levels of the departments, just the units that were involved with UFO case studies.

=== State ===
- Melbourne University
- Local police stations
- Local police CIB Special Branch

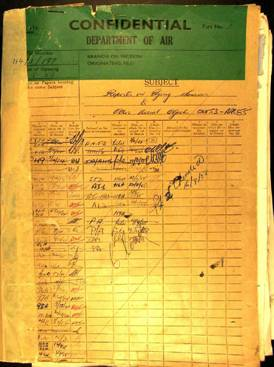
Department of Air UFO folder cover 114/1/997 – 1953 to 1955 – NAA 01948052

=== Federal ===
- Air Board
- Australian Security Intelligence Organisation (ASIO)
- Australian Transport Safety Bureau (ATSB)
- Australian Joint Service Staff (Intelligence)
- Bureau of Air Safety (BAS)
- Bureau of Air Safety Investigation (BASI)
- Bureau of Meteorology (BOM)
- Commonwealth Investigation Section (CIS)
- Commonwealth Scientific & Industrial Research Organisation (CSIRO)
- Defence Scientific and Technical Intelligence (DSTI)
- Director of Scientific Intelligence (DSI)
- Directorate of Air Force Intelligence (DAFI)
- Division of Meteorological Physics (CSIRO)
- Division of Radio Physics (CSIRO)
- Department of Defence (DoD)
- Department of Air (DOA) (1939–1973)
- Department of Aviation (DOA)
- Department of Civil Aviation (DCA)
- Department of External Affairs
- Department of Meteorology (DOM)
- Department of the Navy
- Department of Supply (1950–1974)
- Department of Transport (DOT)
- Joint Intelligence Bureau (JIB)
- Meteorological Branch
- National Standards Laboratory (CSIRO)
- Upper Atmosphere Section (CSIRO)

Note: This above list is far from complete; however, it does lists important pages from the main Government sections that held or handled UFO reports.

From 1930 to 1959, the majority collection of Defence UFO files were held at HQ Southern Air, G Block, Albert Part Barracks, Melbourne, with Army Intelligence. After 1959, the files were moved to RAAF Headquarters, Support Command, Victoria Barracks, Victoria Intelligence Cell, within the main building. These case files were controlled by the Australian Army through the Australian Army Intelligence Corps staff within the Australian Intelligence system, and they played a principal role in the field investigation of any UFO phenomenon in Australia. However, the Army kept a low public profile but filtered reports for action. All departments' Central Offices were located in Melbourne, Victoria, between 1930 and 1969. Then due to government restructure, a majority of departments moved to Canberra. The main collection of UFO files stayed in Victoria until 1989 later going to Canberra or the National Archives of Australia.

=== The Air Force depart Australian ufology ===
On 4 January 1994, RAAF Wing Commander Brett Biddington, on behalf of the Chief of Air Staff, informed every civilian UFO groups around Australia that "The number of reports made to the RAAF in the past decade had declined significantly, which may indicate that organisations such as yours are better known and are meeting the community's requirements." Therefore, the RAAF was not going to investigate or collect any more public reports from that date on. Although the RAAF have officially removed themselves from the public report collection phase, there is evidence that internal investigations, by other government departments, still continued under the new title of Unusual Aerial Phenomena (UAP) or Unusual Aerial Sightings (UAS). Called the "1996 – Defence Instructions (General) ADMIN 55-1", this 1996 Department of Defence (DOD) policy document better known as 'ADMIN 55-1' concerns UAS policy is still used.

For further information on UFO and the Australian Government, files and case reports from 1950 to 1984, search the National Archives of Australia.

== UFO investigation groups ==
- Mutual UFO Network Australia and New Zealand (MUFON)
- Australian Centre for UFO Studies (ACUFOS)
- Australian International UFO Flying Saucer Research (AIUFOFSR)
- Australian UFO Sightings (AUFOS)
- Victorian UFO Action (VUFOA)
- Phenomena Research Australia (PRA)
- Tasmanian UFO Investigation Centre (TUFOIC)
- Victorian UFO Research Society (VUFORS)
- UFO Research (NSW) Incorporated (UFORNSW)
- UFO Research Queensland (UFORQld)

== See also ==
- James E. McDonald
- UFO sightings in Australia
- Valentich disappearance
- Westall High School UFO

== Sources ==
- Auchettl, John, Peter Norris:14 years after, 1992, in PRA Journal, No.7 September 1992, ISSN 1320-0763
- Auchettl, John, The Roots of Australian Ufology, Victorian UFO Research Society (VUFORS), 1985, pp34
- Auchettl, John, An Old Australian Phenomenon, The Australian Annual Flying Saucer Review, Victorian UFO Research Society (VUFORS), 1983, pp18–22
- Boyle, Brian, The Early Years: From Saucers to UFOs, Phenomena Research Victoria, 1961
- Bristol, Les, The Victorian UFO report, 1954 : a compilation of reports from the Victorian press, Victorian UFO Research Society (VUFORS), 1978, pp22, State Library of Victoria Call Number: 001.94 F 52 V
- Druffel, Ann, Firestorm: Dr James E. McDonald's fight for UFO Science, Wild Flower Press, 2003, pp609, ISBN 0-926524-58-5, pp170–171
- Fischer, Ray, The Victorian UFO report, 1954 : a compilation of reports from the Victorian press, Victorian UFO Research Society (VUFORS), 1978, pp22, State Library of Victoria Call Number: 001.94 F 52 V
- Holledge, James, Flying Saucers Over Australia, Horwitz Publications Inc, Melbourne, 1965, NL 629.1334 HOL, Bib ID 2071722
- Norman, Paul, Some Highlights in Australian Ufology, The Australian Annual Flying Saucer Review, Victorian UFO Research Society (VUFORS), 1983, pp10–24
- Seers, Stan, UFOs: The Case for Scientific Myopia, Vantage Press, 1983, pp224, ISBN 0-533-05271-8
