= UFO sightings in Australia =

List of alleged UFO sightings in the nation of Australia

This is a list of sightings of alleged UFOs in Australia.

== Pre 1900 ==
- In 1868, an alderman named Frederick Birmingham in Parramatta, New South Wales, spotted what he described as an ark, more appropriate for traversing the water, floating in the sky before landing in Parramatta Park.

== 1950s ==
- On 22 January 1954, three people in Gawler, South Australia, spotted a white UFO flying overhead followed shortly thereafter by an RAAF jet.

== 1960s ==
- On 19 January 1966, a farmer from Tully, Queensland, reported seeing a large saucer-shaped object, as well as a so-called "nest" of reeds in the swamp where the UFO was spotted.
- On 6 April 1966, a number of students and staff at Westall High School in Clayton South, Victoria said they saw a UFO fly over their school, and then descend into a paddock.

== 1970s ==
- The Valentich Disappearance occurred on 21 October 1978. While piloting a small Cessna 182 aircraft en route to King Island, 20-year-old Frederick Valentich went missing over Bass Strait. Described as a "flying saucer enthusiast", Valentich informed Melbourne air traffic control he was being accompanied by an unknown aircraft. Also, reportedly 3 days earlier a motorist driving on a coastal highway reported his engine & radio cut off and then he saw a UFO with green lights on both ends fly over his car. After it was gone he said the car restarted and he went home and his wife said she saw it also.

== 1980s ==
- On 21 January 1988, a family reported seeing a UFO while traveling across the Nullarbor Plain in South Australia. The family described the object as a "big glowing ball" and "like an egg in an egg cup".

== 1990s ==
- On 10 March 1993, then-69-year-old Eric Thomason photographed a UFO hovering around Maslin Beach.
- On 8 August 1993, Melbourne woman Kelly Cahill said she saw a UFO hovering over the road as she and her husband drove through the Dandenong Ranges near Belgrave, Victoria, and further claimed to have been subsequently abducted by the occupants.

== See also ==
- Bass Strait Triangle
- List of reported UFO sightings
