= Animals in folklore =

Animals in folklore may refer to:

- Animals in Australian folklore
- Animals in Russian folklore
- Animals in Thai folklore
- Animals in Japanese folklore
