= Queensland tiger =

Creature in Australian folklore

Creature information
- Sub grouping: Alien big cat

Origin
- Country: eastern Australia
- Region: Queensland

In Australian folklore, the Queensland tiger is a creature said to live in the Queensland area in eastern Australia.

Also known by the Indigenous name yarri, it is described as being a dog-sized feline with stripes, a long tail, prominent front teeth, and a violent temperament. It has been hypothesized to be a survivor or descendant of the large predatory marsupial Thylacoleo, officially considered to be extinct, or possibly a large feral cat variant (given possible discrepancies with Thylacoleo dentition). In 1926, A. S. le Souef described a "Striped marsupial cat" in The Wild Animals of Australasia, this information later also included in Furred Animals of Australia, by Ellis Troughton, longtime curator of mammals in the Australian Museum.

== History ==
The earliest documented witness reports of a Queensland marsupial tiger date from 1871, with Indigenous traditions of the yarri preceding these.

Naturalist Carl Lumholtz writes in 1878

I learned that on the summit of the Coast Mountains, before mentioned, there lived two varieties of mammals which seemed to me to be unknown to science: but I had much difficulty in acquiring this knowledge. One of the animals [the local Aborigines] called yarri. From their description I conceived it to be a marsupial tiger. It was said to be about the size of a dingo, though its legs were shorter and its tail long, and it was described ... as being very savage. If pursued it climbed up the trees, where the natives did not dare follow it, and by gestures they explained to me how at such times it would growl and bite their hands. Rocky retreats were its most favourite habitat, and its principal food was said to be in a little brown variety of wallaby common in Northern Queensland scrubs. Its flesh was not particularly appreciated ... and if they accidentally killed a yarri they gave it to their old women. In Western Queensland I heard much about an animal which seemed to me to be identical with the yarri here described, and a specimen was once nearly shot by an officer of the black police in the regions I was now visiting [Herbert River].

Lumholtz goes on to contrast the description of this animal with a leaf-eating species recognisable as a tree-kangaroo, possibly the variety ultimately named after him, Lumholtz's tree-kangaroo.

Sightings have been reported consistently from northeast Queensland, and indicate a fast and agile creature (Welfare & Fairley, 1981).

Though the number of purported encounters has diminished since the 1950s, eyewitness accounts have continued to surface into the present day, the so-called "Beast of Buderim" being one such recent example of the phenomenon. Modern sightings, when investigated, have been universally narrowed down to introduced feral cats. Natural selection tends to favour proportions, markings, and behaviours more commonly associated with wild felids, only a few generations after having been introduced into natural habitats. The domestic cat was brought to Australia hundreds of years ago, and has dispersed (and been dispersed) nationally, with only some islands remaining free of their presence. Feral cats have been declared a pest.

Thylacoleo, an animal of similar size and predatory habits, did live in Australia as recently as the late Pleistocene period, perhaps coexisting with the very first humans that arrived in Australia, who were the ancestors of modern Aboriginal Australians. However, scientists estimate that Thylacoleo became extinct 30,000 years ago. Modern sightings of an animal described as remarkably like Thylacoleo have led some researchers to speculate that a small relict population has somehow survived in remote areas. Cryptozoologists who promote the theory of survival of the Tasmanian tiger or thylacine (Thylacinus cynocephalus), a thylacinid that is also currently accepted as extinct, favour the proposed survival of the Queensland tiger. The fundamental difference between the two cases, however, is that the last Tasmanian tiger in captivity died in 1936, and the species was not officially declared extinct until 1986. This makes the prospect of species survival of the thylacine more likely than that of Thylacoleo.

== Thylacine or Thylacoleo? ==
In his 1965 revision of the book Furred Animals of Australia, Ellis Troughton proposed that the Queensland tiger was, in actuality, a mainland variant of the thylacine. Though discussions of the Queensland tiger and thylacine have seen some degree of overlap, consistent differences in phenotypic characteristics between the two have been allegedly observed, namely with regard to head shape, position and colour of stripes, and arboreal habits.

While Cape York artist Percy Trezise believes the region is home to the thylacine, others have cited the popular urban legend of American soldiers bringing pumas to Queensland during World War II, with local Bob Whiston and tree-kangaroo expert Roger Martin suggesting that sightings are either of Lumholtz's or Bennett's tree-kangaroos, less-well-known animals that walk on four legs when terrestrial and which are found in regions where Queensland tiger reports originate. This hypothesis is consistent with one of Bernard Heuvelmans' theories regarding a certain subset of sightings.

== In popular culture ==
The theories of continued Thylacoleo presence on mainland Australia and thylacine survival in Tasmania have been covered in various television shows on the National Geographic Channel and also on Animal Planet's Animal X. Individual sightings of the Queensland marsupial tiger continue to appear in newspapers, although modern sightings have notably diminished in frequency. In the 1970s, naturalist Janeice Plunkett collected over 100 reports of sightings or shootings of "tigers", including accounts alleging that the animal observed was a marsupial. Some writers believe that, if the animal did formerly exist, it may now be extinct, given the diminishing numbers of tiger quolls and northern quolls across the same region.

== See also ==
- Drop bear
