= Yara-ma-yha-who =

Australian Aboriginal mythological creature

Creature information
- Grouping: Legendary creature
- Sub grouping: Vampire
- Folklore: Australian Aboriginal

Origin
- Country: Australia
- Details: Fig trees

The Yara-ma-yha-who is a legendary vampiric monster found in Southeastern Australian Aboriginal mythology. The legend is recounted by David Unaipon. According to legend, the creature resembles a little red frog-like man with a very big head, a large mouth with no teeth and suckers on the ends of its hands and feet.

The Yara-ma-yha-who is said to live in fig trees. Instead of hunting for food, it is described as waiting for an unsuspecting traveller to rest under the tree. The creature then drops down and uses its suckers to drain the victim's blood. After that, it swallows the person, drinks some water, and then takes a nap. When the Yara-ma-yha-who awakens, it regurgitates the victim, leaving them shorter than before. The victim's skin also has a reddish tint that it did not have before. If this process is repeated, the victim becomes a Yara-ma-yha-who themselves.

According to legend, the Yara-ma-yha-who is only active during the day and only targets living prey. "Playing dead" until sunset is offered as a ploy to avoid attack. Additionally, the folklore said that the Yara-ma-yha-who was not meant to be seen and got rid of anybody who glimpsed it. Stories of this creature were reportedly told to misbehaving children.

The origin of this creature is believed to be the tarsier; it is probable that the story was brought to Australia by Malay settlers. The other theory proposed is Thylacoleo carnifex, a carnivorous marsupial that dropped onto its prey from the tree tops, which fits Yara-ma-yha-who dropping from fig trees onto its victims.

== See also ==
- Vampire
- Bogeyman
- Drop bear
- Garkain
