= Westall UFO =

1966 UFO incident in Melbourne, Victoria, Australia

- Location of Australia Location within Melbourne
- Time: 6 April 1966
- Location: Westall High School and The Grange in Clayton South, Victoria, Australia; 37°56′28″S 145°08′2″E
- Also known as: Westall High School UFOs

The Westall UFO was a reported UFO sighting in Australia that occurred on 6 April 1966 in Melbourne, Victoria. The object was observed by multiple individuals, including students at Westall High School. Specific details vary between accounts, which increases the difficulty of identification. The sighting has been commemorated with documentaries, reunions and a local UFO playground.

== Reports ==
On Wednesday, 6 April 1966, students and a teacher from Westall High School (Note: subsequently renamed: Westall Secondary College) reported seeing a flying object. It was described as round with a domed top, and white, grey, or silver in colour. According to the students, the object descended behind a row of trees and into the Grange, an open area south of the school. Some accounts describe the object as being pursued by five unidentified aircraft. Shaun Matthews was on vacation at the Grange and reported seeing an object with a slight purple hue and about twice the size of a family car.

Some witnesses reported seeing the object take off after landing, and some reported seeing it hover rather than land. When students walked to the Grange after the sighting, some reported a landing site, but the details varied between reports. Students variously described a circle of grass as burnt, "boiled" or pressed down. One student interviewed by a local newspaper described a vague circular area flattened by the wind. Students also reported varying numbers of circles from one to three. On 9 April 1966, air force personnel and UFO enthusiasts visited the field but reported nothing of interest. The landowner burned the field to discourage people from entering the property.

== Explanations ==
The following day, an article in Melbourne newspaper The Age downplayed the incident.

Object Perhaps Balloon – An unidentified flying object seen over the Clayton-Moorabbin area yesterday morning might have been a weather balloon. Hundreds of children and a number of teachers at Westall School, Clayton, watched the object during morning break. The Weather Bureau released a balloon at Laverton at 8:30 am and the westerly wind blowing at the time could have moved it into the area where the sighting was reported.

The newspaper also said a number of small aeroplanes circled around it. However, a check later showed that no commercial, private or RAAF pilots had reported anything unusual in the area.

According to Keith Basterfield, a runaway balloon from the HIBAL high-altitude balloon project used to monitor radiation levels after British nuclear tests at Maralinga is a likely explanation. Basterfield located documents in the National Archives and former Department of Supply indicating a test balloon launched from Mildura may have been blown off course "and came down in Clayton South in a paddock near Westall High School, alarming and baffling hundreds of eyewitnesses, including teachers and students". Basterfield said that HIBAL balloons had a white silver appearance and featured a parachute and gas tube trailing from the top, which is consistent with witness descriptions of the object. There were also reports that after the incident, "men in suits" cautioned witnesses not to discuss details of the secret government exercise.

According to skeptic Brian Dunning, "the weather balloon is a likely explanation for the first half of the event". Dunning suggested a nylon target drogue, like a windsock, towed by one plane for the others to chase and known to be in use by the local RAAF at the time, was "at least one very reasonable possibility for the second half". Dunning added that, as years have passed, "descriptions of what was actually seen have now become diluted with made-up descriptions by an unknown number of students who didn't see anything, and there's no way to know which is which".

At the 60th anniversary, paranormal researcher Richard Saunders reviewed the Westall case saying that he believes that "something" happened back in 1966, but thinks that it is a case of "memory fragility, false memory, and memory contagion". The students that say they witnessed something odd in 1966 were young teens and it took until the early 2000's to "systemically interview them", by that time memoires had been embellished, contaminated, forgotten and reshapened. Reports collected at the time tell a story of how different they were, some describe a weather balloon, others say a "round humped silver disc", some saw one, other say they saw five. Different descriptions of the grass where some said they saw one circle, others many circles. Over the years as the students grew up and watched UFO documentaries, discussed it with each other as they processed what had happened, the stories evolve. False memories seem real, and these people are not lying but believe that what they remember is true. What happened at Westall in 1966 was according to Saunders, "conducive to produce false memories, ... in 1966 flying saucers were very much part of the cultural imagination, the space race was at its height, science fiction was flourishing and UFO sightings were a staple of newspaper coverage.

== Media coverage ==
The documentary Westall '66 focuses on the sighting. It is based on interviews that ufologist Shane Ryan conducted with residents. Westall '66 was incorporated into the national history curriculum as a lesson on critical analysis of popular portrayals of historical events. The Phenomenon, a documentary film directed and co-produced by ufologist James Fox, includes content related to the Westall UFO case. In 2026 the ABC Australian Story program discussed the event.

== Local culture ==
Grange Reserve Park at dusk

- A witness reunion was held at Westall Tennis Club Hall, on 8 April 2006, to commemorate the 40th anniversary of the incident.
- The City of Kingston created a children's play space, Grange Reserve UFO Park at The Grange Reserve in Clayton South. The park features a silver UFO with red slides to reflect the 1966 Westall UFO Incident.

== See also ==
- Ariel School UFO incident
- Australian Ufology
- Bass Strait Triangle
- Disappearance of Frederick Valentich
- List of UFO sightings
