= Warraguk =

Mythological creature

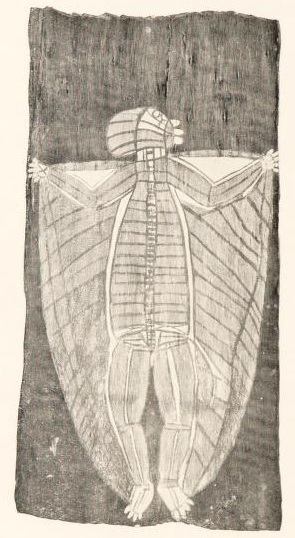
- Bark painting of Warraguk

Creature information
- Grouping: Legendary creature
- Folklore: Australian Aboriginal mythology

Origin
- Country: Australia
- Region: Gunbalanya, Northern Territory

Warraguk is a legendary creature in the mythology of the Gaagudju in the Northern Territory. Said to have first been seen by a medicine man called Mitjuombo, it was described by Walter Baldwin Spencer in the following terms:

[It] is supposed to walk about in the daytime, searching for mormo, or sugar bag. When at rest it lives in the bamboos and paper bark trees, on to which it hangs like a bat. Also it has flaps of skin running on each side of its body from the arms to the legs, by means, of which it flies. Its general form has certainly been suggested by that of the "flying-fox," a large bat that is very commonly met with in the jungle along the river flats in the Kakadu country.

— Spencer (1914)

In his second volume of Wanderings in Wild Australia, Spencer would describe Warraguk as harmless, yet unhelpful to people. He included a bark painting of the creature in the book, noting how its head was in profile, emphasising the nose and jaws, yet still having both eyes visible. Its hair was tied back, forming a mop, and the flap of skin used for flying ran on either side of the body from the hands to the feet, with an additional flap extending from the neck to the thumb. Spencer further noted that the depicted Warraguk's backbone, ribs, pelvic girdle and leg bones were visible.

Charles P. Mountford noted similarities between Warraguk and Garkain.

== See also ==
- Drop bear, a fictitious Australian mammal
