= Garkain =

Mythological creature

Creature information
- Grouping: Legendary creature
- Folklore: Australian Aboriginal mythology

Origin
- Country: Australia
- Region: Arnhem Land, Northern Territory

Garkain is a legendary creature in the Australian Aboriginal mythology of Arnhem Land in the Northern Territory. He is said to be a spirit-man that haunts a dense jungle called Magurlipun near the Liverpool River's mouth. He is similar in size to an Aboriginal man, and is capable of both walking and flying, but lacks the power of speech and does not know how to make fire or tools, thus forcing him to catch prey with his bare hands and eat it raw. Should an unwary traveller enter his domain, Garkain kills them by smothering them with the loose folds of skin on his arms and legs. He is a nocturnal hunter and sleeps during the day on the jungle floor under a pile of leaves.

In 1957, anthropologist Charles P. Mountford donated a eucalyptus bark painting of Garkain (1948 or 1949) from the Gunbalanya Aboriginal community in western Arnhem Land to the Art Gallery of South Australia in Adelaide. The painting shows the creature's flaps of skin, and his feet are illustrated as footprints, as is common in depictions of spiritual and human beings. Mountford noted similarities between Garkain and Warraguk, and observed that the creature was overall not as feared as other spirit beings of the area like the Namarakain and the Nabudi.

== In popular culture ==
Garkains are a species of vampire in The Witcher video game series.

== See also ==
- Drop bear, a fictitious Australian mammal
