= Drop bear =

Hoax in Australian folklore

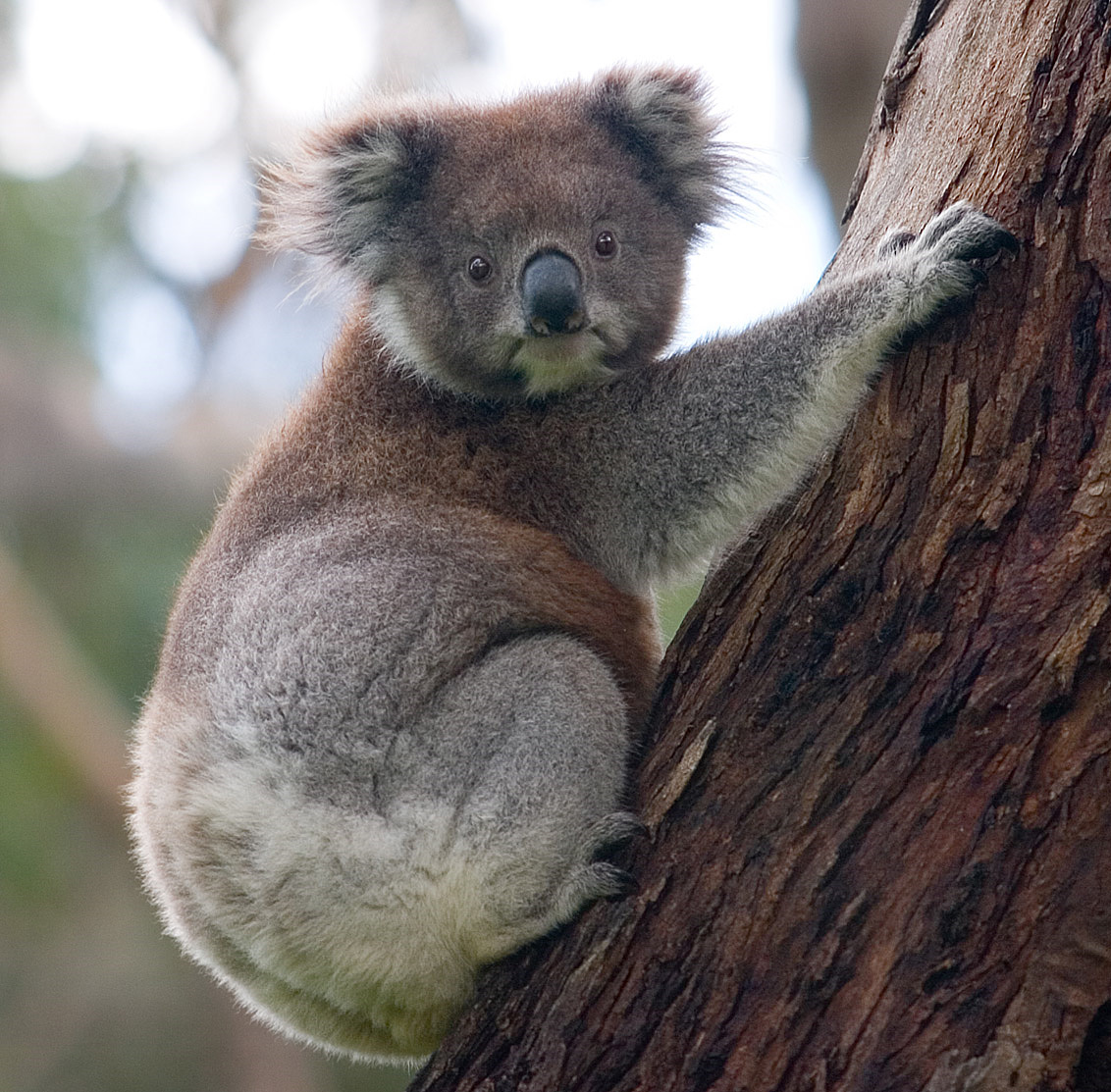
The koala is the main inspiration for the myth of the drop bear.

The drop bear (sometimes dropbear) is a hoax in contemporary Australian folklore featuring a predatory, carnivorous version of the koala. This imaginary animal is commonly spoken about in tall tales designed to scare tourists. While koalas are typically docile herbivores (and are not bears), drop bears are described as unusually large and vicious marsupials that inhabit treetops and attack unsuspecting people (or other prey) that walk beneath them by dropping onto their heads from above.

Although the drop bear originated as a hoax, observers have noted its similarities to Thylacoleo, a hypercarnivorous marsupial from the Late Pleistocene.

== Origin ==
The origin of the drop bear myth is unknown. It has been attributed to a sketch in The Paul Hogan Show in which koalas jump out of the trees and attack a man. Others say it began as a scary story for children, or as a trick played on soldiers visiting Australia for training.

A 1967 article in Army, the Australian Army's newspaper, mentions "a dreaded Drop Bear", and a 1976 article about an army base refers to "the legends and stories of drop bears and hoop snakes that supposedly originated there". Other early appearances in print include a Royal Australian Navy News article in 1978 and a classified advertisement in the Canberra Times in 1982.

== Stories and tall tales ==
Stories about drop bears are generally used as an in-joke intended to frighten and confuse outsiders while amusing locals, similar to North American "fearsome critters" such as the jackalope. Tourists are the main targets of such stories. These tales are often accompanied by advice that the hearer adopt various tactics purported to deter drop bear attacks—including placing forks in the hair, having Vegemite or toothpaste spread behind the ears or in the armpits, urinating on oneself, and only speaking English in an Australian accent.

== Popularisation ==
The website of the Australian Museum contains an entry for the "drop bear legend" written in a serious tone similar to entries for other, real, species. The entry classifies the drop bear as Thylarctos plummetus and describes them as "a large, arboreal, predatory marsupial related to the koala", the size of a leopard, having coarse orange fur with dark mottling, with powerful forearms for climbing and attacking prey, and a bite made using broad powerful premolars rather than canines. Specifically it states that they weigh 120 kilograms (260 lb) and have a length of 130 centimetres (51 in). The tongue-in-cheek entry was created for "silly season". The Australian Museum also established a small display in the museum itself, exhibiting artefacts which it stated "may, or may not, relate to actual drop bears."

Australian Geographic ran an article on its website on 1 April 2013 (April Fools' Day) purporting that researchers had found that drop bears were more likely to attack tourists than people with Australian accents. The article was based on a 2012 paper published in Australian Geographer, and despite referencing the Australian Museum entry on drop bears in several places, images included with the Australian Geographic article were sourced from Australian Geographer and did not match the Australian Museum's species description.

The drop bear hoax, using a polar bear, was humorously referenced in an advertisement for Bundaberg Rum.

In the Discworld novel The Last Continent by Terry Pratchett, drop bears inhabit the continent of Fourecks, (Note: Australian beer Castlemaine XXXX is known colloquially in the United Kingdom as 4X.) a land portrayed as a parody of Australia. This version of the drop bear tale shows the animals with well-padded backsides to cushion their fall.

Australian Chris Toms and New Zealand musician Johnny Batchelor formed a band named Dropbears in 1981.

== Similarities to Thylacoleo ==
Observers have noted similarities between the drop bear and the specimen Thylacoleo. Like the drop bear, Thylacoleo (also called the "marsupial lion") was a hypercarnivorous marsupial found only in Australia.

A 2016 Nature study of claw marks in caves concluded the marsupial lions could climb rock faces as well as trees. In a 2018 study, paleontologists conjectured them to be ambush predators that would leap on unsuspecting prey. Incisions on bones of the extinct kangaroo Macropus titan suggest Thylacoleo fed in a similar way to modern cheetahs, using their sharp teeth to slice open the ribcage of their prey, thereby accessing the internal organs. They may have killed by using their front claws as either stabbing weapons, or as a way to grab their prey with strangulation or suffocation.

== See also ==
- Garkain
- Hoop snake
- Jackalope
- Pacific Northwest tree octopus
- Snipe hunt
- Warraguk
- Wild haggis
- Yara-ma-yha-who
- Yowie
