= Franklin House (Launceston) =

Coordinates: 41°29′23″S 147°10′8″E

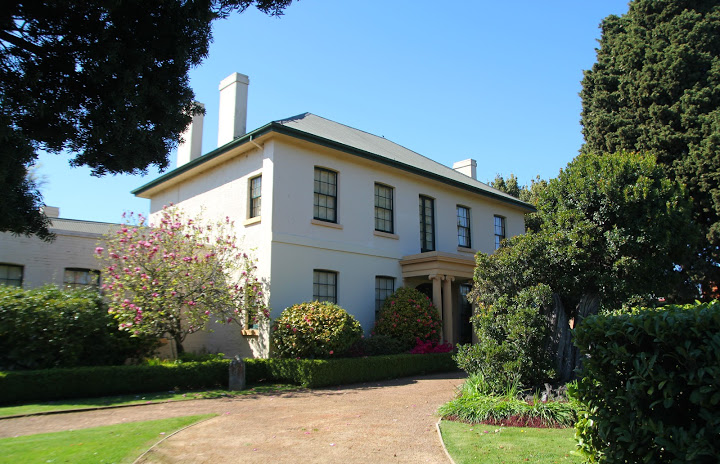
- Interactive map of the Franklin House area

General information
- Type: Public
- Architectural style: Georgian
- Location: Franklin Village, Launceston, Tasmania, Australia
- Completed: 1838; 188 years ago
- Owner: National Trust

Technical details
- Material: Stone, Australian red cedar

Franklin House in Franklin Village, near Launceston, Tasmania, is a historic house that is preserved by Tasmania's National Trust of Australia and is open to the public. Built in 1838 for Britton Jones, it later became a school for boys.

== History ==
It is a Georgian style house that was built in 1838 for former convict Britton Jones, a Launceston brewer and innkeeper.

It was later a school for boys, between 1842 and 1866 when leased to schoolmaster William Keeler Hawkes. The house and gardens are located in Youngtown, Tasmania, and are available for public tours.

In 1960 Franklin House was the first heritage property taken over by the National Trust in Tasmania.

== Review of haunting claims ==
In early 2013 the Tas Ghost Hunting society undertook an investigation into possible paranormal activity after staff members reported unusual experiences while working there. They visited twice and set up equipment in a number of rooms. In a sitting room they reportedly found higher levels of energy than normal using an electromagnetic sensor. In an upstairs bedroom they asked several times the question "'What is your name?'" Mr. Hull a member of the Tas Ghost Hunting society said "'It came back with the answer, Will'".

In response, members of the Launceston Skeptics group have challenged the Tas Ghost Hunting society's results by saying "'It has to be good, if it's an extraordinary claim, that is that there are ghosts there it needs very solid evidence'". According to skeptic member Jin-Oh Choi, '"We want to make sure the way they're recording the information is actually correct.'"

According to investigator Benjamin Radford "most ghost hunting groups... make many methodological mistakes." In his article for Skeptical Inquirer Radford concludes that ghost hunters should care about doing a truly scientific investigation: "I believe that if ghosts exist, they are important and deserve to be taken seriously. Most of the efforts to investigate ghosts so far have been badly flawed and unscientific --- and, not surprisingly, fruitless."

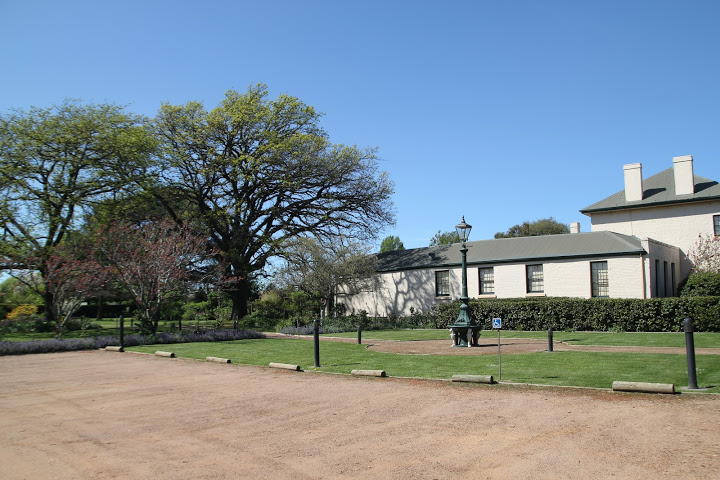
Franklin House side and garden

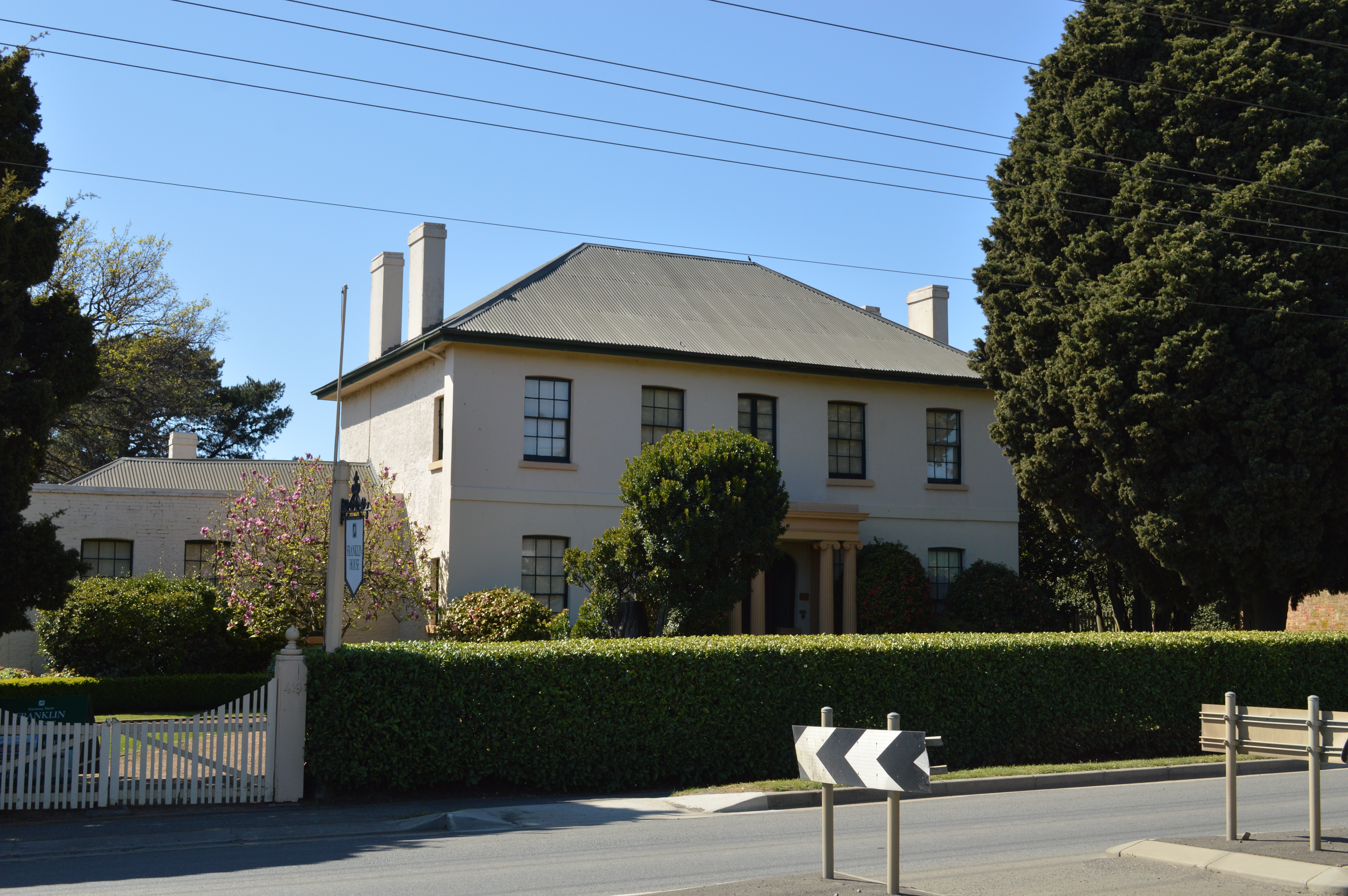
Franklin House from road
