= Honest history =

Coalition

Honest History
- Formation: March 2013; 13 years ago
- Founder: David Stephens; Michael Piggott; Richard Thwaites; Sue Wareham; Marilyn Lake
- Founded at: Canberra, Australia
- Dissolved: February 2019; 7 years ago
- Location: Australia
- Fields: Australian history
- Former presidents: Frank Bongiorno; Peter Stanley
- Editor: David Stephens
- Key people: Alison Broinowski; Michael Piggott; Pamela Burton; Carolyn Holbrook
- Affiliations: The Australian Historical Association
- Website: http://honesthistory.net.au

Honest History is a professional coalition of historians in Australia. Founded in March 2013, the coalition sought to challenge national myths surrounding ANZAC involvement in the Gallipoli Campaign. The coalition argued that historical interpretations of Australia's involvement in the First World War (1914–1918) have been contested among historians and have evolved over time. In combating the popular narratives and political rhetoric related to Anzac Day, the coalition sought to provide historical evidence to provide a more "balanced" view of the period.

In 2017, The Honest History Book was published, which consisted of multiple essays written by historians affiliated with the Honest History coalition. In 2019, a submission was made to the Joint Standing Committee on the National Capital and External Territories by members of the Honest History coalition to bring into question how people engage with the Australian War Memorial.

In February 2019, members of the Honest History coalition have deregistered its legal status as an official incorporation which has been made effective after November. Despite having a less official status as an association, the Honest History coalition continues to remain active in mobilising their support base through their website and social media platforms.

== Background ==
Members of the Honest History coalition sought to challenge national myths and popular narratives of Australian history. They argued that conversations surrounding Australia's involvement in the Gallipoli campaign have been dominated by conservative voices which seek to glorify the war as a formative experience of Australia's national identity. Members of the coalition attempted to combat the dominance of conservative voices surrounding WWI by raising awareness of politically progressive viewpoints in order to demonstrate that historical interpretations regarding Anzac Day have been historically contested and popular interpretations have changed over time depending on political context.

In engaging with the history wars of Australian history, members of the coalition also sought to bring awareness to the historical context behind mythmaking and nation building of the legacy of the Anzac through the lens of privilege and hegemony. They aimed to detract the emphasis from military history which emphasises the leadership, battle strategies and operations of the Australian military during the First World War. Rather, they aim to highlight the participation of Australian civilians on the homefront during the First World War and the ways in which they have been affected by the war effort.

The Honest History coalition has cautioned against the oversimplification and glorification of Australia's efforts in the Gallipoli Campaign, emphasising the adverse effects of the First World War. They also noted that due to Australia's multicultural makeup, the national narratives regarding Anzac Day fail to resonate as heavily to a significant portion of Australia's population.

Members of the Honest History coalition recognised that the First World War is taught to students as an entry point to engage in Australian history. One of the efforts of the coalitions included engaging students to understand what they believe are neglected aspects of WWI history and to develop critical thinking skills. In challenging the way history is taught at schools, they emphasise the importance of moral reasoning and political discourse and engaging in historical debates.

== History ==
=== Formation ===
The Honest History coalition was officially organised in March 2013. Members of the coalition felt dissatisfied with how the legacy of Australia's role in the Gallipoli campaign has been represented through Anzac Day and the Australian War Memorial. On 7 November 2013, the Honest History website was officially launched by journalist Paul Daley at the Manning Clark House. The primary aim of the website was for members of the coalition to carry out their activities in raising awareness and diversity of historical opinion on key issues in Australian history.

=== The Honest History Book (2017) ===
In April 2017, The Honest History Book was published which sought to challenge popular narratives within Australian History. Edited by David Stephens and Alison Broinowski, the book contains multiple essays written by members affiliated with the Honest History coalition. Historians involved in composing the book include: Larissa Behrendt, Frank Bongiorno, Paul Daley, Mark Dapin, Carolyn Holbrook, Carmen Lawrence, Stuart Macintyre, Mark McKenna and Peter Stanley. The topics range from Indigenous history and the Gallipoli Campaign to more social issues including multiculturalism, foreign policy, social equality and environmentalism in Australia.

==== Critical reception ====
The Honest History Book have been generally well received among journalists and other historians. Stephen Caroll of The Sydney Morning Herald called the book "a long overdue assessment" on Australian history. Other reviewers commending the "timely" nature of the book, reflecting the trend of historical approaches in revisiting Australian history. Writing for the Evatt Journal, Michelle Arrow called the book "provocative, combative and myth-busting" which can "hopefully encourage Australians to demand more from the media, government and cultural institutions that shape our views of our past". Catie Gilchrist of The Dictionary of Sydney also gave a positive review stating that it is a "challenging, engaging, at times fist pumpingly 'you have nailed what is so wrong with Australian politics and history' sort of book".

In acknowledging the "public attacks" historians critical of Australia's ANZAC history have endured, public historian Anna Clark endorsed the book as important in delving and uncovering myths in Australian history. However, in writing for the Sydney Review of Books, Clark added that the book could have improved by "including international studies of memory and historical consciousness, as well as their implications for historical analysis and research".

=== Challenges to the Australian War Memorial ===
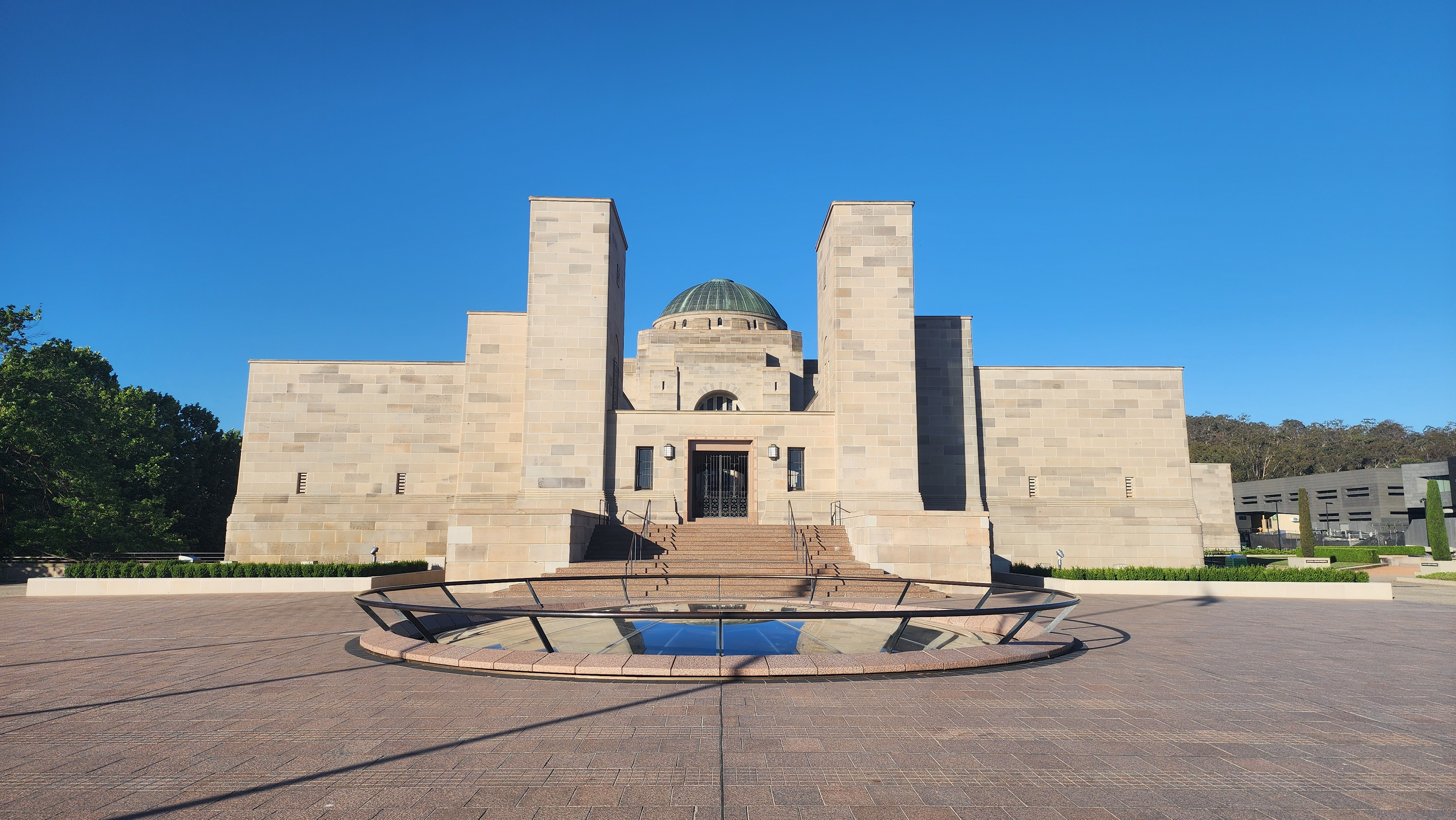
The Australian War Memorial

In 2019, a submission was made to the Joint Standing Committee on the National Capital and External Territories by members of the Honest History coalition. Members of the coalition sought to bring into question the Australian War Memorial and argued that it had decontextualised the realities of the First World War. The coalition claims that the memorial has been primarily used for "entertainment" purposes rather than educating Australians about the implications of Australia's involvement in the Gallipoli Campaign.

Members of the coalition put forth recommendations which argued for better transparency behind the funding of the memorial as well as the stakeholders involved in donations towards the memorial. The coalition also argued that funding should not be heavily allocated to the memorial, as it should not be treated with higher priority compared to other historical institutions.

Currently, Honest History continues to inform and update their followers on the funding of the Australian War Memorial through their website and social media platforms in which they also share online petitions concerning the funding of the building.

=== Cancellation of incorporation ===
In February 2019, members of the Honest History coalition announced that they have voluntarily cancelled its legal status as an official organisation under the Associations Incorporation Act 1991. This was made effective in November of that year. Reasons behind their cancellation remain unspecified by the members of the coalition.

== Current activities ==
The Honest History coalition continues to promote their activities through their social media platforms and website to continue to mobilise their supporter base on certain political issues including the funding of the Australian War Memorial. Their online newsletter which is hosted on their website is currently updating and has several entries that have been cited by other professional historians. Their website and online newsletters have been archived by The National Library of Australia.

Since 2019, Honest History has provided scholarships for secondary school history teachers to attend the annual Australian Historical Association Conference. Through their involvement with the Australian Historical Association (AHA), their annual scholarships served to cover the costs in accommodation, travel and registration. In 2019, Honest History has donated to Professional Historians Australia to financially support historians in the association to attend the annual AHA conferences.

On 28 June 2019, David Stephens, a member of Honest History, contributed a submission towards an independent review to the National Archives of Australia concerning the preservation of digital archives containing Commonwealth information. In the submission, Stephens raised the importance of maintaining the archives as a way of balancing Australian history.

== See also ==
- History wars
- Historical revisionism
