= Lennie Gwyther =

Australian long distance solo horse rider

Lennie (Len) Gwyther
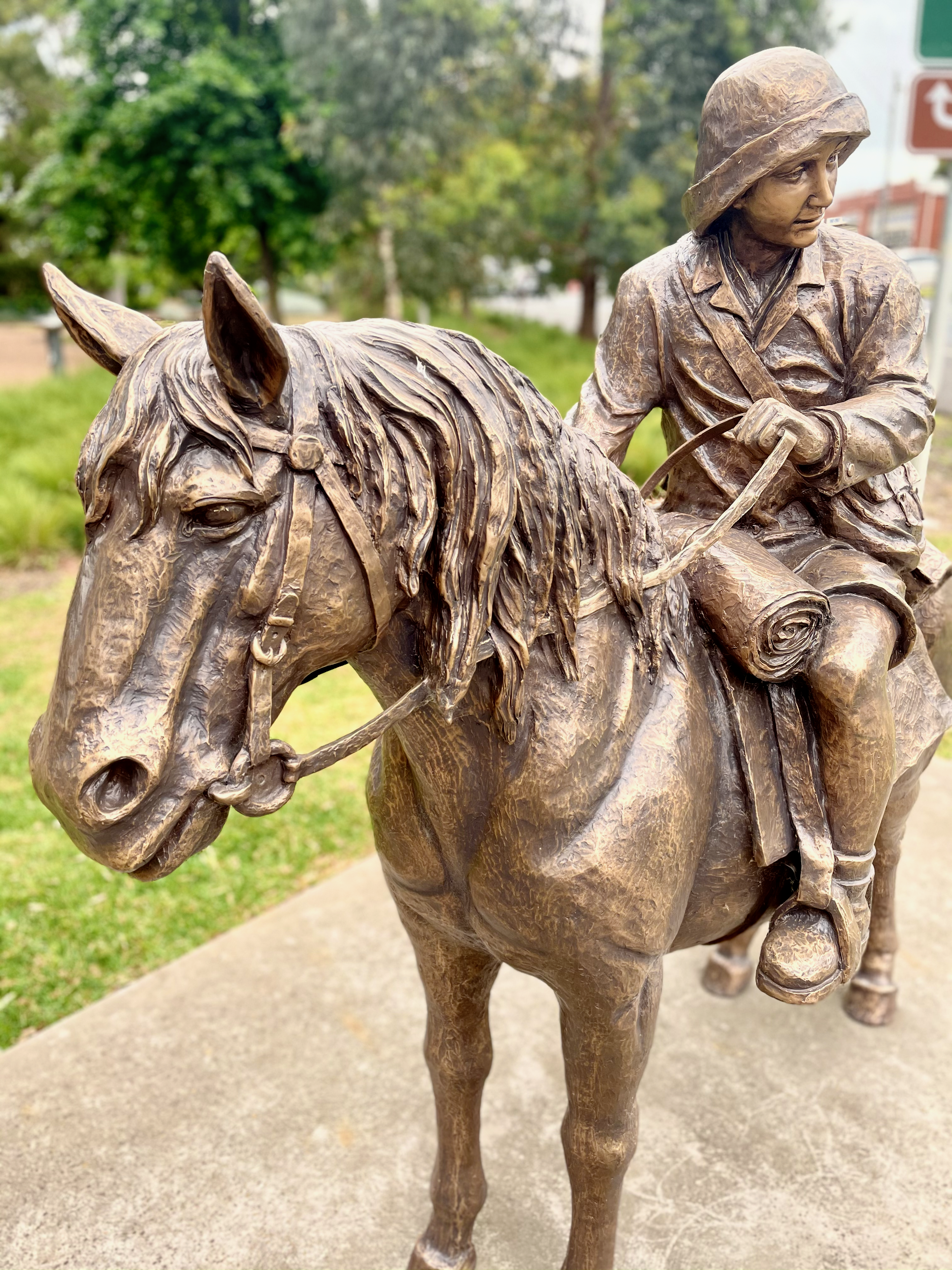
- Memorial statue in Leongatha
- Born: 18 April 1922; Leongatha, Victoria, Australia
- Died: 18 June 1992 (aged 70)
- Other name: Lennie the Legend
- Known for: Solo horse journey at age 9, to watch the opening of the Sydney Harbour Bridge

Lennie Gwyther (18 April 1922 – 18 June 1992) was an Australian figure of significance due to his 1932 solo horseback journey, as a nine-year-old boy, from Leongatha, Victoria, to Sydney, New South Wales. Riding his horse, Ginger Mick, Gwyther undertook a 1,000-kilometre (620 mi) journey to watch the opening of the Sydney Harbour Bridge.

== Early life ==
Charles James Leonard "Lennie" Gwyther was born in Leongatha, on 18 April 1922 to parents Captain Leo Tennyson Gwyther and Clara Amelia Gwyther (née Simon).

On his second birthday, Lennie's grandfather gave him a chestnut pony named Ginger Mick who shared his birthday. Ginger Mick was named after Lenny's father's favourite character from C.J Dennis' book The Moods of Ginger Mick.

When Lennie was nine, his father broke his leg while working on the farm. While his father was in hospital, Lennie took over the responsibilities on the farm.

Offered a reward for this work, Lennie asked to attend the opening of the Sydney Harbour Bridge. That was largely because of his interest with the engineering and construction of the bridge. His mother, Clara (Clare) Gwyther, was unsure of this arrangement but, due to the fulfilment of his duties, communication with those in Sydney, and the map Lennie and Captain Leo Tennyson Gwyther created, she allowed Lennie to go.

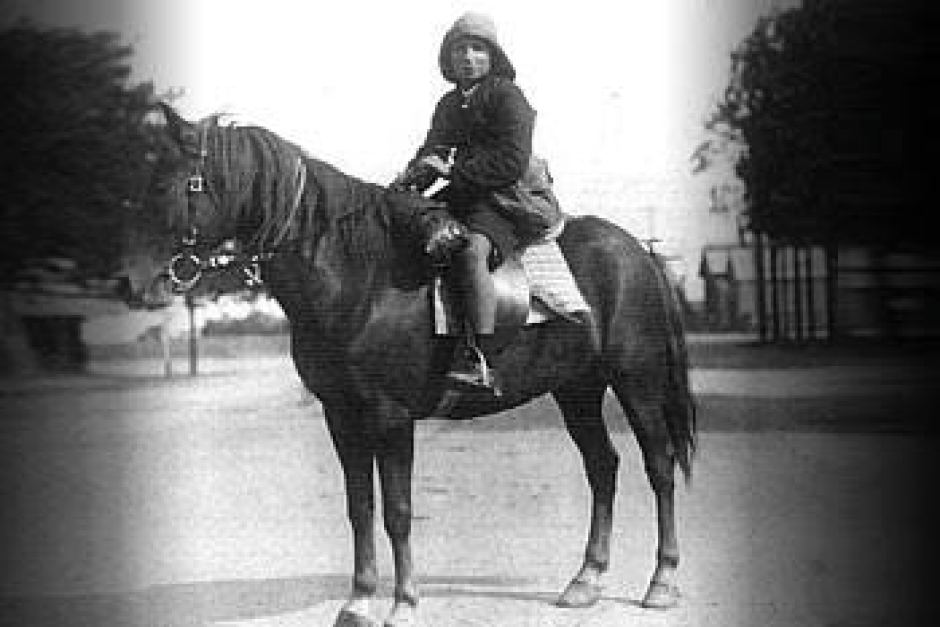
Lennie photographed on his journey with Ginger Mick

== Journey to Sydney ==
On 3 February 1932, Lennie and Ginger Mick left Leongatha on the expedition to Sydney. He carried a haversack that included his toothbrush, silk pyjamas, spare clothes and a water bottle.

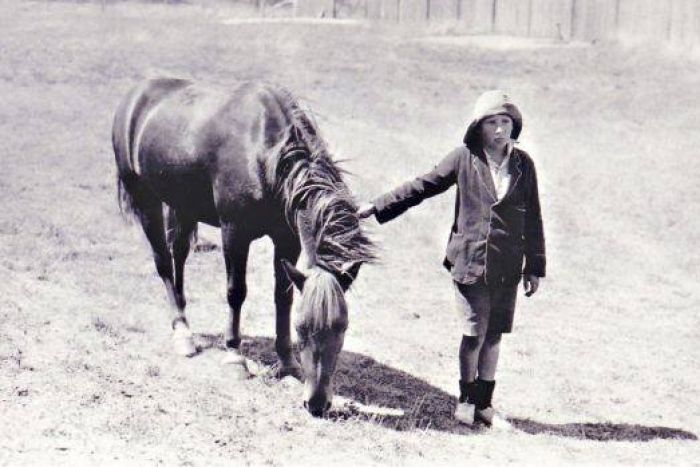
Lennie alongside Ginger Mick before he departed

His journey was widely publicised in the media, particularly newspapers. Frequent updates regarding his whereabouts led Lennie to encounter experiences that were unprecedented on his departure. For example, outside of Parliament House in Canberra he met, shook the hand of, and had tea with Prime Minister Joseph Lyons. Other instances include being "attacked by vagabonds" and being met with a bushfire. In Sydney, he met with Lord Mayor, Sir Samuel Walder, while also visiting Circular Quay, Bondi Beach and Taronga Zoo, where he rode an elephant.

As he arrived in Martin Place, accompanied by 25 police, Gwyther was met by 10,000 cheering citizens. The Secretary of the Royal Agricultural Society, Colonel Somerville, also greeted him. He was wearing "khaki breeches, boots, and leggings, and a thick coat, and [was] carrying a cloth sun hat in his hand."

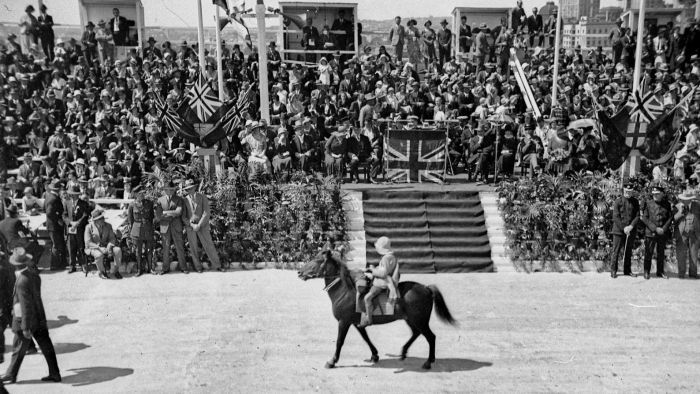
Taking part in the opening of the Sydney Harbour Bridge parade

On 19 March 1932, Gwyther, with Ginger Mick, participated in the Royal Easter Show and paraded across the Sydney Harbour bridge in its opening. Following that, on 21 March, Lennie met cricketer Don Bradman at the Sydney Cricket Ground where he was given a signed cricket bat.

His journey home involved talking to children at Gunning Public School about his experience as well as celebrating his tenth birthday with shire councillors, being given one Australian pound. As he passed through Urana, he attended a children's ball as well as a reception organised by the local shire president. He also spent a couple of days in Widgiewa with councillor Otway McLaurin Falkiner.

Upon his arrival back to Leongatha, Lennie was met by 800 citizens. He also delivered a return letter from Sydney's Lord Mayor to the president of the Woorayl Shire Council.

Gwyther was also recorded in the Guilds Records as the "youngest known person to make a solo equestrian journey." In Leongatha, Victoria, Gwyther Siding Road was named after him.

On 10 June, after his tenth birthday, Lennie Gwyther returned home and resumed with his family commitments on the Leongatha 'Flers' farm.

== Later life and death ==
At the age of 19, Lennie enlisted in the army for World War II where he served in the Morotai Islands in the Pacific.

He worked as an engineer with General Motors' Holden at Fishermans Bend, Victoria and lived in the Melbourne suburb of Hampton.

In later life, Lennie's passion for fishing and sailing was reflected in the fact that he built a yacht, with the intention of sailing to Tasmania and then to New Zealand. His granddaughter commented in 2015 that "he had a lathe in the shed and he was always turning wood or making tools or tables. There wasn't really anything he couldn't do. I'm sure he would have attempted sailing around the world, that's how adventurous he was."

Lennie Gwyther died of cancer in 1992, at the age of 70.

== Popular culture ==
Lennie Gwyther has been commemorated and referenced in popular culture, indicating his ongoing legacy into the 21st century.

=== Books ===
On 1 February 2015, NLA Publishing published Lennie the Legend: Solo to Sydney by Pony by Stephanie Owen Reeder. It is a children's book which follows Gwyther and Ginger Mick on their journey to New South Wales from Victoria while also referencing Lennie and his family history. In 2016, this book won Children's Book Council of Australia's (CBCA's) Eve Pownall Award for Information Books.

Peter Lalor's book The Bridge: An Epic Story of an Australian Icon - the Sydney Harbour Bridge (2006) also commemorates Lennie Gwyther in chapter 11.

Mary Small's book Lennie's Ride (2010), published by Small Endeavour Publishing, also references Lennie Gwyther and his story. The illustrator of the pictures is Marion Wilcocks. It includes a chapter that was written with assistance from Beryl Ferrier, Lennie's sister, regarding their family and the farm.

Lennie's sister, Beryl Ferrier, also wrote a book Lennie Rides on and Reflections which was published in 2016.

Corinne Fenton's To The Bridge (illustrated by Andrew McLean) is a children's book which tells the story of Lennie's ride.

=== Radio ===
In February 2018, on the ABC radio program "Conversations", Richard Fidler and Sarah Kanowski, with guest Peter Lalor, spoke about Lennie Gwyther and his journey in the "depression-era Australia".

On 17 April 2018, the ABC program "History Listen", produced by Lyn Gallacher, included a "Lennie the Legend" episode, featuring Lennie's family members, Julie Campbell and Beryl Ferrier, author Stephanie Owen Reeder, and music teachers Roz Girvan from Clifton Hill and Jess Stein from Leongatha Primary School.

== Commemorative statue ==
A statue to commemorate Lennie and Ginger Mick's journey was unveiled in Leongatha in 2017.

Funded through a Federal Government community grant and community fundraising, the statue is located next to a public rest stop.

The statue was designed in-house and manufactured at Arrow Bronze of Dandenong, Victoria.
