= Disappearance of Frederick Valentich =

1978 disappearance of a pilot over Bass Strait, Australia

Valentich disappearance
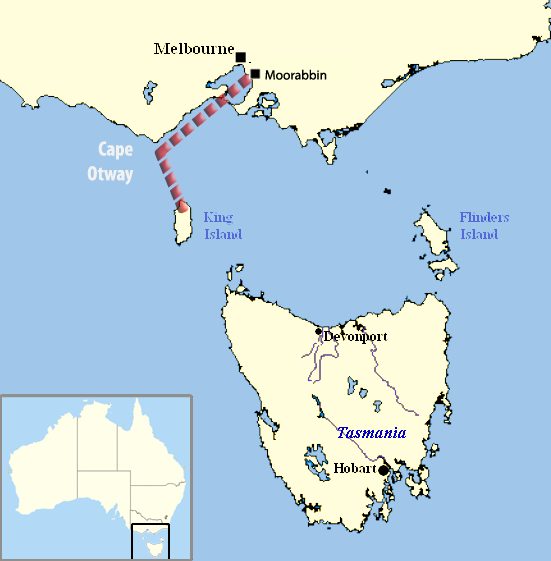
- Valentich's intended route from Moorabbin Airport to King Island over Bass Strait
- Date: 21 October 1978 (aged 20)
- Time: 19:12 AEST
- Duration: Missing for 47 years, 10 months and 14 days
- Location: Bass Strait, Australia; 39°24′S 143°45′E
- Cause: Unknown
- Missing: 1

Frederick Valentich (/ˈvæl.ən.tɪtʃ/, VAL-ən-tich) was an Australian pilot who disappeared while on a 125-nautical-mile (232 km) flight in a Cessna 182L light aircraft, registered VH-DSJ, over Bass Strait. On the evening of Saturday 21 October 1978, twenty-year-old Valentich informed Melbourne air traffic control that he was being accompanied by an aircraft about 1,000 feet (300 m) above him and that his engine had begun running roughly, before finally reporting: "It's not an aircraft".

There were belated reports of a UFO sighting in Australia on the night of the disappearance; however, the Department of Transport was sceptical that a UFO was behind Valentich's disappearance, and some of their officials speculated that "Valentich became disorientated and saw his own lights reflected in the water, or lights from a nearby island, while flying upside down".

== Frederick Valentich ==
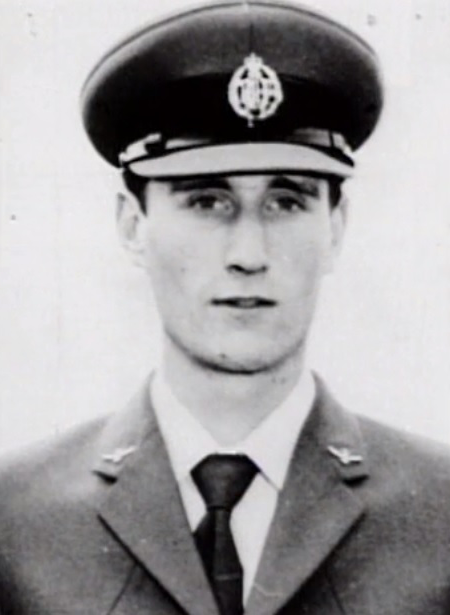
Frederick Valentich

Frederick Valentich (9 June 1958 – disappeared 21 October 1978) had about 150 total hours of flying time and held a class-four instrument rating, which authorised him to fly at night, but only "in visual meteorological conditions". He had twice applied to enlist in the Royal Australian Air Force (RAAF), but had been rejected because of inadequate educational qualifications. He was a member of the RAAF Air Training Corps, determined to have a career in aviation.

Valentich was studying part time to become a commercial pilot but had a poor achievement record, having twice failed all five commercial licence examination subjects. As recently as the month before his disappearance, Valentich had failed three more commercial licence subjects. He had been involved in flying incidents, for example, straying into a controlled zone in Sydney, for which he received a warning, and twice deliberately flying into a cloud, for which prosecution was being considered. According to his father, Guido, Valentich was an ardent believer in UFOs and had been worried about being attacked by them. Six days before his disappearance, Valentich discussed with his girlfriend Rhonda Rushton the possibility of a UFO taking him away, according to her.

The destination of Valentich's final flight was King Island, but his motivation for the flight is unknown. He told flight officials that he was going to King Island to pick up some friends, while he told others that he was going to pick up crayfish. Later investigations found both stated reasons to be untrue. Valentich had also failed to inform King Island Airport of his intention to land there, going against "standard procedure".

== Details ==
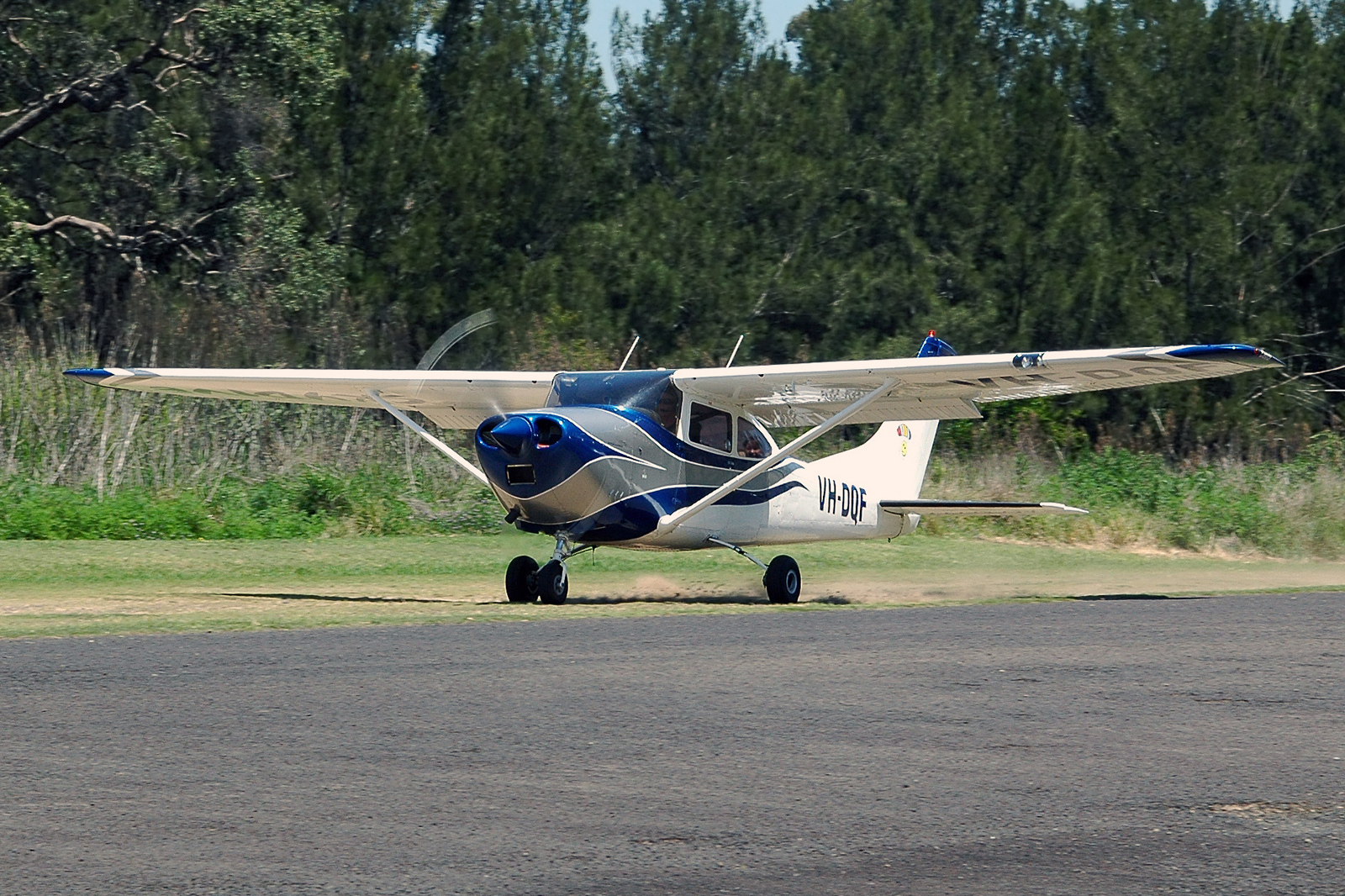
A Cessna 182 similar to the aircraft involved

Valentich radioed Melbourne Flight Service at 7:06 pm to report that an unidentified aircraft was following him at 4,500 feet (1,400 m). He was told that there was no known traffic at that level. Valentich said that he could see a large unknown aircraft which appeared to be illuminated by four bright landing lights. He was unable to confirm its type, but said that it had passed about 1,000 feet (300 m) overhead and was moving at high speed. Valentich then reported that the aircraft was approaching him from the east and said that the other pilot might be purposely toying with him. Valentich said that the aircraft was "orbiting" above him and that it had a shiny metal surface and a green light on it. Valentich further reported that he was experiencing engine problems. Asked to identify the aircraft, Valentich radioed: "It's not an aircraft." His transmission was then interrupted by unidentified noise described as "metallic, scraping sounds" before all contact was lost.

== Search and rescue ==
A sea and air search was undertaken that included oceangoing ship traffic, an RAAF Lockheed P-3 Orion aircraft, plus eight civilian aircraft. The search encompassed over 1,000 square miles (2,600 km^{2}). Search efforts ceased on 25 October 1978 without result.

== Official investigation ==
An investigation into Valentich's disappearance by the Australian Department of Transport was unable to determine the cause, but it was "presumed fatal" for Valentich. Five years after Valentich's aircraft went missing, an engine cowl flap was found washed ashore on Flinders Island. In July 1983, the Bureau of Air Safety Investigation asked the Royal Australian Navy Research Laboratory (RANRL) about the likelihood that the cowl flap might have "travelled" to its ultimate position from the region where the aircraft had disappeared. The bureau noted that "the part has been identified as having come from a Cessna 182 aircraft between a certain range of serial numbers", which included Valentich's aircraft.

== Proposed explanations ==
Some Western Australia Department of Transport officials speculated that "Valentich became disorientated and saw his own lights reflected in the water, or lights from a nearby island, while flying upside down".

It has also been proposed that Valentich staged his own disappearance: even taking into account a trip of between 30 and 45 minutes to Cape Otway, the single-engine Cessna 182 still had enough fuel to fly 800 km (500 mi); despite ideal conditions, at no time was the aircraft plotted on radar, casting doubts as to whether it was ever near Cape Otway; and Melbourne police received reports of a light aircraft making a mysterious landing not far from Cape Otway at the same time as Valentich's disappearance.

There has also been speculation that Valentich committed suicide. According to ufologist Keith Basterfield, interviews with doctors and colleagues who knew him virtually eliminated this possibility.

According to Brian Dunning, Valentich's radio conversation was similar to the dialogue from a scene in the film Close Encounters of the Third Kind, which was released less than a year before the disappearance, and was popular among pilots, young people, and UFO fans. Dunning speculated that it is possible that Valentich was trying to imitate the scene for fun, and deliberately made his aircraft fly in a circular pattern in order to "give the radar guys something to see", but accidentally became disoriented and crashed into the water.

A 2013 review of the radio transcripts and other data by astronomer and retired United States Air Force pilot James McGaha and author Joe Nickell proposes that the inexperienced Valentich was deceived by the illusion of a tilted horizon for which he attempted to compensate and inadvertently put his aircraft into a downward, so-called "graveyard spiral" which he initially mistook for simple orbiting of the aircraft. According to the authors, the G-forces of a tightening spiral would decrease fuel flow, resulting in the "rough idling" reported by Valentich. McGaha and Nickell also propose that the apparently stationary, overhead lights that Valentich reported were probably the planets Venus, Mars and Mercury, along with the bright star Antares, which would have behaved in a way consistent with Valentich's description.

=== Ufologists ===
Ufologists have claimed that a UFO either destroyed Valentich's aircraft or abducted him, saying that some individuals reported seeing "an erratically moving green light in the sky" and that he was "in a steep dive at the time". Ufologists believe these accounts are significant because of the "green light" mentioned in Valentich's radio transmissions. However, the Mount Stromlo Observatory noted that there was a meteorite stream that night, with ten to fifteen sightings per hour.

The group Ground Saucer Watch, based in Phoenix, Arizona, United States, claims that photos taken by plumber Roy Manifold on the day of Valentich's disappearance show a fast-moving object exiting the water near Cape Otway Lighthouse. According to UFO writer Jerome Clark, Ground Saucer Watch argued that they showed "a bona fide unknown flying object, of moderate dimensions, apparently surrounded by a cloud-like vapour/exhaust residue", although the pictures were not clear enough to identify the object. Snopes editor Jordan Liles suggested that the object was most likely an “out-of-focus fly” or a "bird passing by".

== See also ==
- Felix Moncla – a US Air Force pilot who disappeared in similar circumstances
- Australian ufology
- Bass Strait Triangle
- List of people who disappeared mysteriously: post-1970
- Westall UFO
