= Bass Strait Triangle =

Waters separating Victoria and Tasmania

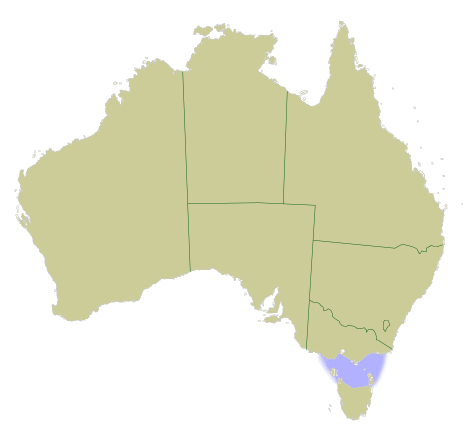
Map of Australia with Bass Strait "triangle" marked in light blue

The Bass Strait Triangle comprises the waters that separate the states of Victoria and Tasmania, including Bass Strait, in southeastern Australia. The term Bass Strait Triangle (inspired by the Bermuda Triangle) appears to have been first used (Note: The term appears on the back cover of The Devil's Meridian by Kevin Killey & Gary Lester, published in 1980, and makes up part of the title of Jack Loney's book on the region published in the same year.) following the disappearance of Frederick Valentich in 1978, although the region had a bad reputation (never ascribed to paranormal forces, however) long before that.

== Geography of Bass Strait ==
Bass Strait is a generally shallow (average depth of 50 m (160 ft)) stretch of water approximately 300 km (190 mi) wide and 200 km (120 mi) from north to south, encompassed by the entire northern coastline of Tasmania and Victoria's central to eastern coast. The prevailing winds and currents are westerly, the latter being divided by King Island, Tasmania at the western entrance to the strait, causing unpredictable sea conditions, especially when strong winds occur. For example, strong southerly winds can cause a strong northerly current reflecting from the Victorian coast. The combination of winds, currents, tidal flow and the shallow bottom often lead to tall waves, often of short length, with a confused short swell often conflicting in direction.

All shipping to the busy ports of Melbourne, Stanley, Burnie, Devonport, Bell Bay, and Launceston, as well as Bass Strait islands like King Island and Flinders Island, must pass through Bass Strait, and it is also the route of choice for many ships passing from the Australian west to east coasts. Most air traffic between Tasmania and the Australian mainland flies at least in part over or adjacent to it.

== Incidents ==
Bass Strait was discovered by westerners following the wreck of the ship Sydney Cove on the Furneaux Group in 1797, and one of the vessels engaged in the salvage operation, the sloop Eliza, went missing on her return voyage to Sydney. Hundreds of vessels from small yachts and fishing craft up to the size of bulk carriers have come to grief in Bass Strait since that time through hitting reefs, running aground on the coastline, running aground on river bars while entering port, or foundering due to stress of weather. Some dozens were lost without a trace.

Actual north-south (and vice versa) crossing of Bass Strait seldom occurred until after Melbourne was established in 1835. From 1838-1840, at least seven vessels were lost with all hands on their way to or from the new settlement, wreckage from only three being identified. Rumours that some of these vessels had fallen victim to wreckers appear baseless, the main cause probably being bad weather and poor charts.

- In 1858, the British warship HMS Sappho disappeared, with well over one hundred lives lost, and no positively identifiable wreckage located.
- In 1901, the SS Federal disappeared carrying coal from New South Wales with 31 crew. Her wreck was not located until 2019.
- In 1906, the SS Ferdinand Fischer, a German cargo ship, disappeared.
- The SS Amelia J, a schooner, disappeared on 10 September 1920. HMAS Swordsman was commissioned to search for the ship, and while searching the Bass Strait, a second ship - the barquentine SS Southern Cross - disappeared. A military Airco DH.9A engaged in the search would also then disappear. Wreckage of the SS Southern Cross was found on King Island; the SS Amelia J was never discovered, and neither was the Airco DH.9A.
- The de Havilland Express Miss Hobart went missing soon after entering service in 1934. Only a small amount of wreckage was found on the Victorian coast.
- Loina, a Holyman airliner, crashed into the sea near Flinders Island with three crew and two passengers lost In 1935. No bodies were found. The cause of both accidents was probably a combination of human error with the known poor design of the aircraft.
- During World War II, several aircraft — mostly Royal Australian Air Force Bristol Beaufort bombers — were lost during exercises in Bass Strait while on training flights out of air bases, mainly RAAF Base East Sale near Sale, Victoria. These accidents were probably caused by the inexperienced crew crashing into the sea while performing low-level bombing practice — similar accidents occurred over land.
- In 1972, a de Havilland Tiger Moth flown by Brenda Hean and Max Price disappeared on a flight from Tasmania to Canberra as part of protests against the flooding of Lake Pedder for a hydroelectricity scheme. It was believed to have crashed at sea somewhere between the East Coast and Flinders Island. Sabotage by pro-development interests was alleged.
- In 1978, a Cessna flown by Frederick Valentich disappeared after reporting a UFO.
- In 1979, the yacht Charleston disappeared while sailing to Sydney to join the Sydney to Hobart Yacht Race.
