= List of legendary creatures (T) =

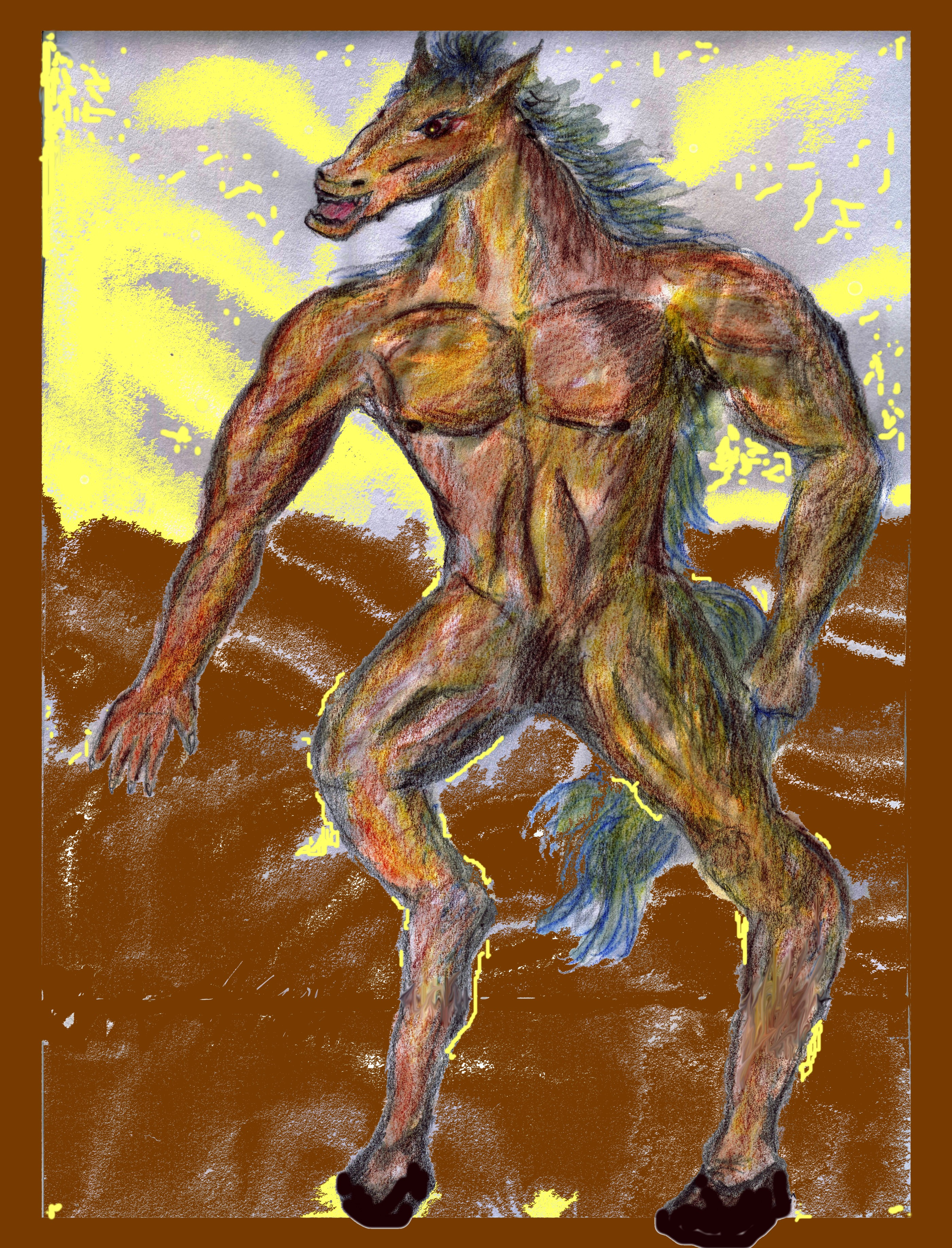
Tikbalang

1. Tachash (Jewish) – Large land animal
2. Tailypo (American Folklore) (Appalachia) – Powerful animal, that takes revenge on those who steal its tail
3. Taimatsumaru (Japanese) – Tengu surrounded in demonic fire
4. Takam (Persian) – Nature spirit
5. Taka-onna (Japanese) – Female spirit which can stretch itself to peer into the second story of a building
6. Talos (Greek) – Giant made of bronze
7. Tangie (Scottish) – Shapeshifting water spirit
8. Taniwha (Māori) – Water spirit
9. Tantankororin (Japanese) – Unharvested persimmon which becomes a monster
10. Tanuki (Japanese) – Shapeshifting raccoon dog
11. Taotao Mona (Mariana Islands) – Ancestral spirits
12. Taotie (Chinese) – Greed spirit
13. Taowu (Chinese) – A stubborn beast
14. Tapairu (Mangaia) – Nature spirit
15. Tapio (Finnish) – Forest deity
16. Tarasque (French) – Dragon with leonine, turtle, bear, and human attributes
17. Tartalo (Basque) – One-eyed giant
18. Tartaruchi (Christian) – Demonic punisher
19. Tatami-tataki (Japanese) – Poltergeist that hits the tatami mats at night
20. Tatzelwurm – (Alpine Folklore) lizard-like creature, often described as having the face of a cat, with a serpent-like body which may be slender or stubby, with four short legs or two forelegs
21. Tatsu – Japanese dragon
22. Taurokampoi (Etruscan) – Fish-tailed bull
23. Tchico
24. Teju Jagua (Guaraní) – Lizard with seven dog heads
25. Tecumbalam (Mayan) – Bird
26. Teke Teke (Japanese) – Vengeful spirit of a slain schoolgirl with a half upper-torso body
27. Tek-ko-kui (Taiwanese) – Bamboo ghost
28. Tengu (Japanese) – Anthropomorphic bird
29. Tennin (Japanese) – Angelic humanoid
30. Te-no-me (Japanese) – Ghost of a blind man, with his eyes on his hands
31. Tepegoz (Azerbaijani) – Azerbaijani mythical creature similar to the cyclops Polyphemus
32. Terrible Monster (Jewish) – Lion-eagle-scorpion hybrid made from the blood of murder victims
33. Teumessian Fox (Greek) – Gigantic fox
34. Te Wheke-a-Muturangi (Māori) – Gigantic octopus
35. Theriocephalus (Medieval folklore) – Animal-headed humanoid
36. Three hares (Many cultures worldwide) – Symbolic animal
37. Three-legged bird (Asia and Africa) – Solar bird
38. Thunderbird (Native American) – Avian lightning bird spirit
39. Thor (Norse mythology) – God of thunder and storm
40. Tiangou (Chinese) – Meteoric dog
41. Tianlong (Chinese) – Celestial dragon
42. Tibicena (Canarian) – Evil dog
43. Tiddy Mun (English) – Bog spirit
44. Tigmamanukan (Philippine) – Asian fairy bluebird
45. Tigris (Jewish) – Giant lion
46. Tikbalang (Philippine) – Anthropomorphic horse
47. Tikoloshe (Zulu) – Little people and water spirit
48. Timingila (Hindu) – Sea monster
49. Tipua (Māori) – Spirit that protects a specific place
50. Titan (Greek) – Primeval god
51. Tiyanak (Philippine) – Demons that are souls of dead unbaptized babies
52. Tizheruk (Inuit) – Sea serpent
53. Tlahuelpuchi (Tlaxcalan) – Shapeshifting vampire
54. Tōfu-kozō (Japanese) – Spirit child carrying a block of tofu
55. Toire-no-Hanakosan (Japanese) – Ghost who lurks in grade school restroom stalls
56. Tomte (Scandinavian) – House spirit
57. Topielec (Slavic) – Water spirit
58. Tōtetsu (Japanese) – Greed spirit
59. Tooth fairy
60. Toyol (Malay) – Servant spirit
61. Trasgo (Spanish and Portuguese) – Grotesque, mischievous little people
62. Trauco (Chilota) – Fertility spirit
63. Trenti (Cantabrian) – Diminutive demon
64. Trickster – Character in a story which exhibits a great degree of intellect or secret knowledge, and uses it to play tricks or otherwise disobey normal rules and conventional behaviour
65. Tripurasura (Hindu) – Demonic inhabitants of Tripura
66. Tritons (Greek) – Male human-fish hybrid
67. Troll (Norse) – Nature spirit
68. Trow (Orkney and Shetland) – Little people and nature spirits
69. Tsi-noo (Abenaki) – Vampiric demon
70. Tsuchigumo (Japanese) – Shapeshifting, giant spider
71. Tsuchinoko (Japanese) – Plump snake-like creature
72. Tsukumogami (Japanese) – Inanimate object that becomes animated after existing for 100 years
73. Tsul 'Kalu (Cherokee) – Giant nature spirit
74. Tsurara-onna (Japanese) – Icicle woman
75. Tsurube-otoshi (Japanese) – Monster which drops or lowers a bucket from the top of a tree to catch people
76. Tugarin Zmeyevich (Slavic) – Evil shapeshifter
77. Tylwyth Teg (Welsh) – Nature spirit
78. Tulpa
79. Tunda
80. Tupilaq (Inuit) – Animated construct
81. Turehu (Māori) – Pale spirit
82. Türst (Swiss) – legendary figure who turns people into dogs
83. Turul (Hungarian) – Giant falcon that helped shape the origins of the Magyars
84. Tyger (Heraldry) – Like a real tiger, but lacks stripes; has the tufted tail of a lion and a thick mane along the neck like a horse
85. Typhon (Greek) – Winged, snake-legged giant
86. Tzitzimitl (Aztec) – Skeletal star spirit
