= Kamaitachi =

Yōkai

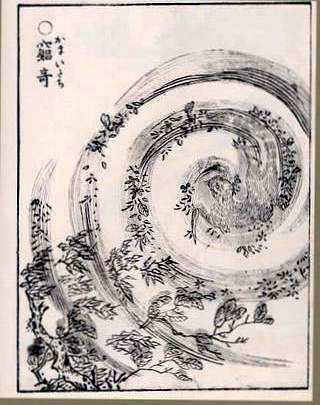
"Kamaitachi" (窮奇) from the "Gazu Hyakki Yagyō by Toriyama Sekien

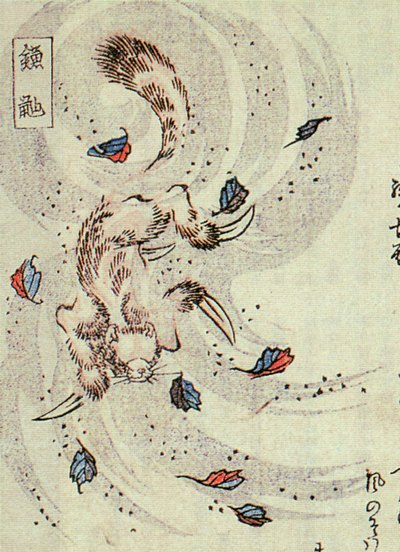
"Kamaitachi" (鎌鼬) from the Kyōka Hyaku Monogatari by Masasumi Ryūkansaijin

Kamaitachi (鎌鼬; Japanese pronunciation: [ka.ma.iꜜ.ta.tɕi]) is a Japanese yōkai from the oral tradition of the Kōshin'etsu region. It can also refer to the strange events that this creature causes.

They appear riding on dust devils and cut people using their sickle-like front claws, delivering sharp, painless wounds. The name is a combination of the words kama (sickle), and itachi (weasel).

== Origin ==
The name was originally thought to be a corruption of the word kamae tachi ("stance sword"), but like the kyūki in the "Yin" part of Toriyama Sekien's Gazu Hyakki Yagyō, they were thus re-used and depicted as a weasel yōkai, eventually becoming established as the yōkai it is now. In the "Mimibukuro" by Negishi Shizumori as well, children in the estate called Kagaya in Edo were enveloped by a whirlwind. Footsteps of a beast remained on the surface of their backs and it was written that this was the proof of a kamae tachi (構太刀). As a beast with fur like that of a hedgehog and a cry like that of a dog which flies through the air with wings, they are said to attack people with limbs like that of a sickle or razor.

== Legends by area ==
Devilish winds that cut people are spoken of in the Chūbu, Kinki, and other regions. There are many similar legends passed down in snowy regions and there are some regions where whirlwinds themselves are called "kamaitachi". On occasions of cold wind and other times, it can happen that one would fall and get an inexplicable leg injury.

In the Shin'etsu region, a kamaitachi is said to be the work of an evil god and there is a folk belief that one would encounter calamity by stepping on a calendar. It is counted among the seven mysteries of Echigo.

In the Tōhoku region, when one receives an injury from a kamaitachi, it is said that by burning an old calendar black and putting it on the wound, this would heal.

In Hida, in the Niu River basin, they are said in legends to be a company of three evil gods. The first god would knock down the person, the next god would cut them with a blade, and the third god would put some medicine on it, which is why there is no bleeding or pain. There are also regions that think of these three gods as a parent, child and brother.

In the Yoshio District area of the Nara Prefecture, it is said that when one gets bit by a kamaitachi invisible to the human eye, one would tumble over; even though no blood comes out, there is a big opening in the flesh.

In the eastern part of Aichi Prefecture, they are also called idzuna (飯綱) and it is said that since an izuna-user once forgot to tell his disciple how to seal an izuna, the runaway izuna would ride on whirlwinds and attack people in order to suck their living blood. It is said that the reason why no blood comes from the wounds from a kamaitachi is because the blood is being sucked away.

In the mountainous regions of Kōchi Prefecture and Tokushima Prefecture among other areas of West Japan, encountering such a strange event is called "being cut by a nogama (野鎌, "wild sickle")" and they are said to be caused by grass-cutting sickles that have been left and forgotten in fields and have ended up turning into yōkai. They are also said to be a sickle's vengeful spirit (onryō) that has turned it into a tsukumogami (a receptacle that has turned into yōkai). In the Iya region, Tokushima Prefecture, it is said that sickles and hoes used for digging the grave for a funeral, if left out for seven days, turn into a nogama, and when one encounters a nogama, it is said that one should chant, "beneath the feet on the bottom-left of Buddha, is the stump of a kurotake [a species of bamboo], and quickly became clean, but let it grow back (hotoke no hidari no shita no omiashi no shita no, kurotake no kirikabu nari, itau wa nakare, hayaku routa ga, haekisaru)."

In East Japan, they are also said to be the work of a mantis or longhorn beetle's ghost. In the town of Katakai, Santō District, Niigata Prefecture, in a place called "Kamakiri-zaka" (鎌切坂 or 蟷螂坂), after a giant mantis that once lived there was crushed to death by heavy snow, it is said that when one falls over on the hill, because of the mantis' curse, one would receive a wound as if one was cut by a sickle, result in one suffering from black blood flowing out.

In the western parts of Japan, kamaitachi are called kazakama (風鎌, "wind sickle") and said to slice off people's skins. There is no pain the instant after it is scraped off, but after a while an unbearable pain and bleeding would start to occur. It is said that one could protect against this by obtaining an old calendar in one's hand.

There are tales of encountering these not only outdoors but also indoors. In Edo, there are tales of a woman encountering one in a bathroom in Yotsuya and a man encountering one while putting on a geta in Ushigome. In Ōme, there is a story where a certain woman had her lover stolen by another woman, whom she greatly resented. When she cut her own hair, that hair became a kamaitachi and decapitated her rival with a single stroke. In this way, the legends of the kamaitachi in these various areas represent the same phenomena, but what their true identity is thought to be is not uniform.

== Writings in old literature ==
In the Edo period, in the essay "Sōzan Chomon Kishū (想山著聞奇集)" by Miyoshi Shōzan, a feudal warrior of Owari, it is said that the wounds from a kamaitachi does not result in pain or bleeding at first, but afterwards causes intense pain and great amounts of bleeding, so much that sometimes even the bones can be seen from the wound opening, and there is even a risk of death. Since these wounds are often received on the lower part of the body, it also states that a kamaitachi cannot jump higher than about 1 shaku (about 30 centimeters). Also according to Miyoshi Shōzan, as kamaitachi live in puddles after rain, it is said that there are those who played in puddles and those who cross rivers who encountered kamaitachi.

In the Hokuriku region, according to the collection of fantastic stories, the Hokuetsu Kidan, a kamaitachi is a wound resulting from touching the blade of a dreadful god.

In the Kokon Hyaku Monogatari Hyōban from the Edo period, it states: "people of the capital and those of true samurai families are not affected by this evil (都がたの人または名字なる侍にはこの災ひなく候)." If one encounters a kamaitachi, since there are medics who are familiar with this, they would rub some medicine on the wound, healing it so one would never die from it. In the northern parts of the country, it is cold in the shadows, weakening things. As it is cold in the northern parts of the country, cold wind blasts gather around, and the air is intensely cold. Borrowing this, these wounds are said to be caused by chimi (魑魅 "mountain demons") in mountains and valleys. It is said that the reason why people from the capital and samurai don't receive this wound is because of the principle that malice does not win against true spirit.

== Similar legends ==
In the Musashi region and Kanagawa Prefecture, they are called kamakaze (鎌風, "sickle wind"), and in Shizuoka Prefecture they are called akuzen-kaze (悪旋風, "evil whirlwind").

Also, they are of a somewhat different nature, but there are also things called taiba-kaze (堤馬風, "style wind"). There are also regions where there are legends where devilish winds inflict fatal wounds on humans.

In the Toyoura District, Yamaguchi Prefecture, it is called yama misaki (美咲山, blossom mountain), as it is a strange phenomenon that appears deep in the mountains. Here there is a demonic wind taking on the shape of a human's severed head and flying above fallen leaves like a wheel. It is said that humans who encounter this wind would get a severe fever. In Ainoshima, Hagi, its true identity is said to be ghosts that have no place to go after death and have become wind that wanders around. In the village of Rokutō, Abu District, Yamaguchi Prefecture, it is said that people who died due to cliffs or shipwrecks would become yama-misaki eight days after death. In the village of Kōchi, Hata District, Kōchi (now Shimanto), these yama-misaki are called ryōge and they are considered to be the spirits of those who died through unforeseen accidents. Happening upon one of these is called "ryōge-tsuki" (being possessed by a ryōge).

In Amami Ōshima, it is said that near the time of Obon, at cemetery roads and other such places, a lukewarm wind would graze by and give one a chill, and when one returns home and tries taking off one's clothing, there would be some kind of speckle on some part of the body. Before long, a high fever comes about and one would need to go to a yuta (a shaman of Okinawa, Kagoshima, or the Amami Islands) to have it exorcised.

In the village of Kuroiwa, Takaoka District, Kōchi Prefecture) (now Ochi), a devilish wind resembling the aforementioned nogama is called muchi (鞭, "whip"), but this is said to be a wind that blows on top of a field as if a whip was flung around. It is said that when struck by it, one falls ill. In Toyosama, Tosa District (now Kōchi city), muchi are said to kill horses and cattle that take along people who travel on roads at night. It is said that one protects against this by covering the eyes of the horses and cattle.

== See also ==
- Eikoh Hosoe – Japanese photographer and filmmaker who photographed a series of images with dancer Tatsumi Hijikata as kamaitachi
- Kama (tool)
- List of legendary creatures from Japan
- Ramidreju – another species of mythological weasel, from Cantabrian mythology
- Weasel
