= Kota Shrine =

Kota Shrine or Kota-jinja can mean:

- Kota Shrine (Miyazaki), a Japanese Shinto shrine in Miyazaki Prefecture
- Kota Shrine (Niigata), a Japanese Shinto shrine in Niigata Prefecture
