= Arquetu =

Being in Cantabrian mythology

The Arquetu is a being that appears in Cantabrian mythology as an old man with the drawing of a green cross and 7 keys on his forehead. He lends money to those foolish enough to spend their fortune but if they do it again, he punishes them by giving them a curse of eternal poverty.
