= Cuélebre =

Creature in Asturian and Cantabrian mythology

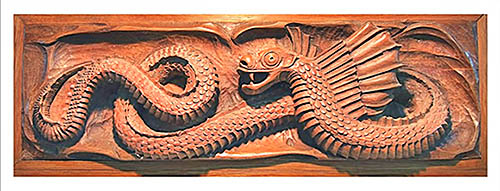
El Cuélebre. Woodcarving by Lise.

Cuélebre (Asturian) or Culebre (Cantabrian) is a legendary creature in the mythology of Asturias and Cantabria in northern Spain. It is depicted as a giant, winged serpent-dragon that inhabits caves and guards treasures, often keeping anjanas (fairy-like beings, also known as xanas) captive. Over time, these creatures age, their scales become impenetrable, and bat-like wings grow on their bodies. Although immortal, they eventually leave their homeland and fly to a mythical paradise called Mar Cuajada, located beyond the sea.

They do not usually move, but when they do, it is in order to eat cattle and people. To defeat the creature, one may feed it a red-hot stone or a loaf of bread filled with pins, which would cause its death. Its spit is believed to turn into a magical stone with the power to heal various diseases.

According to Asturian and Cantabrian folklore, Midsummer (the night of San Juan) is a magical time when brave individuals can challenge the cuélebre, as its spells lose their power. Defeating it on this night allows one to marry the xana and claim its treasure. However, in Cantabrian lore, Saint Bartholomew's Night is said to be when the cuélebre becomes even more powerful, unleashing its wrath in vengeance against humans.

== See also ==
- La Guita Xica
