= Ventolin =

Ventolin may refer to:

- Ventolín, creature of the Cantabrian mythology.
- Salbutamol (albuterol), bronchodilator medication marketed under the brand name Ventolin among others
- Ventolin (EP), a song by Aphex Twin
