= Fish-man =

Legendary Spanish man turned into a fish

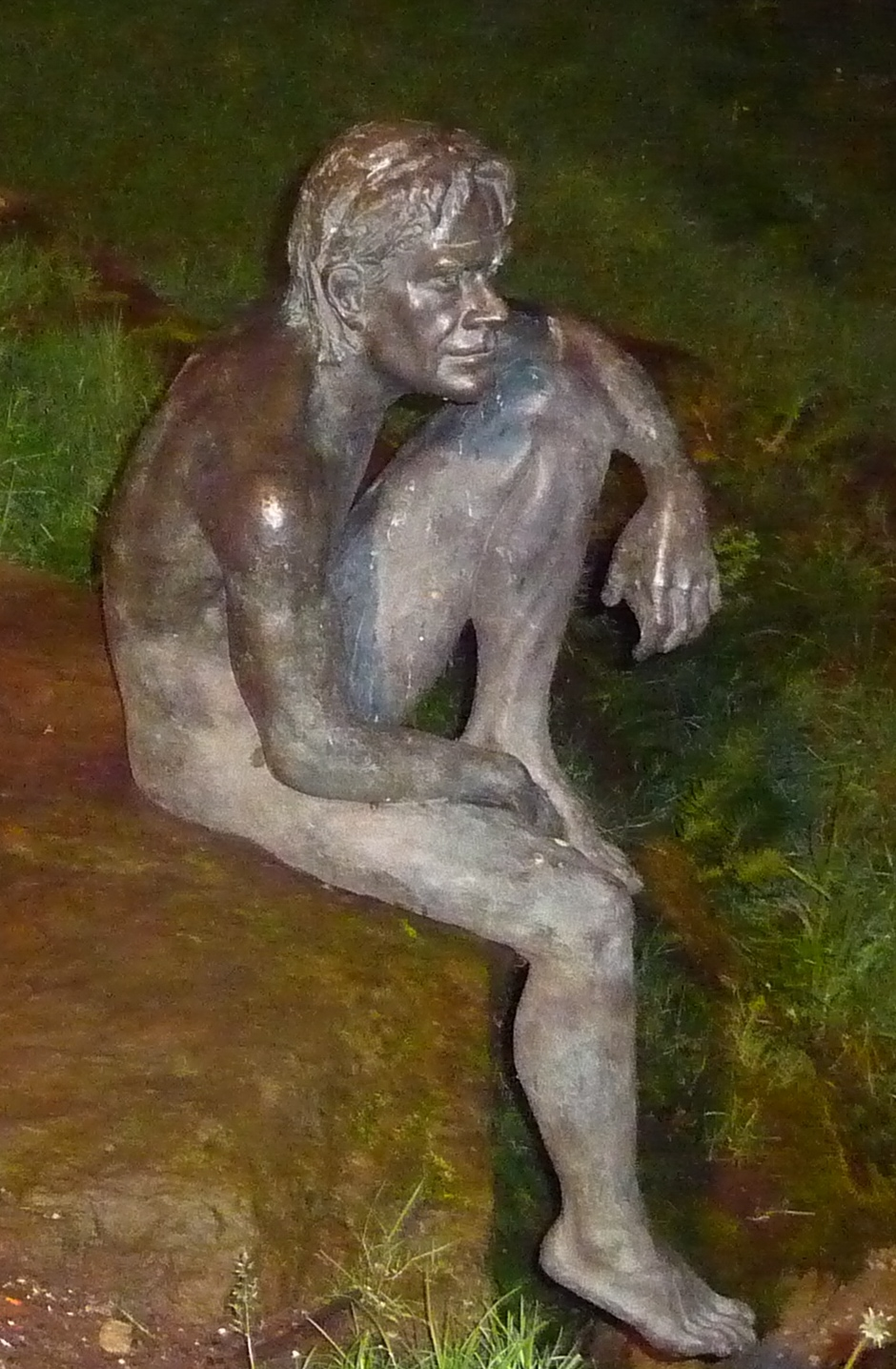
- Fish-man statue in Liérganes, Cantabria

Folk tale
- Name: Fish-man
- Also known as: Francisco de la Vega Casar
- Mythology: Mythology of Cantabria
- Country: Spain
- Region: Cantabria
- Origin Date: c. 1674

The fish-man of Liérganes (Spanish: El hombre pez) is an entity of the mythology of Cantabria, located in the north of Spain. The fish-man would be an amphibian human-looking being, who looked a lot like a metamorphosis of a real human being who was lost at sea. His story was examined by Enlightenment writer Benito Jerónimo Feijoo, who claimed that the story was true.

== The legend ==
According to Feijoo, legend has it that around 1650 there lived in Liérganes, a small village in Cantabria, northern Spain, a couple named Francisco de la Vega and María del Casar. The couple had four sons, and when the father died, the mother, lacking means, decided to send one of her sons to Bilbao so that he could learn a trade as a carpenter. This son, who according to Feijoo was called Francisco de la Vega Casar, lived in Bilbao as a carpenter till 1674 when, on Saint John's Day Eve, he went with some friends to swim in Bilbao's estuary. Although he was allegedly a good swimmer, the currents of the river took him and he could not get back to the shore. He was last seen swimming away into the sea, and it was thought that he had drowned.

However, five years later, in 1679, while some fishers were seafaring in the Bay of Cadiz, in southern Spain, they noticed that a strange-looking creature had become entangled with their fishing nets, and was trying to fight its way out. Although they tried to capture it, the creature was able to set itself free. During the following weeks, several local fishermen reported having seen the creature, until in the end, they were able to capture it by tricking it with loaves of bread. When they got the creature on board, they found that it had indeed a human shape: it looked like a young man, with white skin and thin red hair. However, he also showed some fish-like signs, such as a strip of scales that went down from his throat to his stomach, another one that covered his spine, and what seemingly were gills around his neck.

Thinking of it as some kind of monster, the fishermen took the creature to the convent of Saint Francis nearby, where the creature was allegedly exorcised and then interrogated in several languages without any success. After several days of questioning, the creature finally articulated a word, "Liérganes", the meaning of which nobody knew. This extraordinary event soon spread all around the Cadiz bay area, and nobody was able to recognise the meaning of Liérganes until a sailor from northern Spain who happened to be in the port of Cadiz commented that close to his home town there was a small village called Liérganes. Domingo de la Cantolla, secretary of the Holy Office, confirmed that there was a place called Liérganes near the city of Santander from which he himself came. The bishop of Cadiz thus sent word to Santander regarding the found creature, including a physical description so that anybody somehow related to the creature could recognise it. From Liérganes came the word that no creature had ever been seen around the town, and that the only extraordinary event that had happened lately was the tragic death of Francisco de la Vega, who was indeed red haired, in Bilbao five years earlier.

A friar in the convent where the creature was being kept postulated that the fish-man could perhaps be Francisco de la Vega, so he asked and was granted permission to take the creature with him to Liérganes. Allegedly, when they were close to Liérganes, the friar let the fish-man free and followed him. The creature was able to guide him directly to Liérganes, and not only that, he took him directly to the house of María del Casar, who recognised him as her late son Francisco.

The fish-man was then left to live with his family, and he kept a tranquil yet odd lifestyle: he would always walk barefoot, and unless he was given clothes, he would rather walk around nude. He never really talked; at most he would sometimes mutter words such as tobacco, bread or wine, but without any link to the desire of smoking, eating or drinking. When he ate, he did it with avidity, but then he was able not to eat for a week at a time. He was easygoing and even obliging, and whichever simple task he was asked to do, he would do it promptly but without enthusiasm. After nine years living in such a fashion, he went to the sea to swim and was never seen again.

== Controversy regarding Feijoo's claim ==
In his tale of the legend, Feijoo offers a great deal of details, dates and names. He claims that when he first heard about the fish-man's story, he could not believe it, but after having confronted all the testimonies and documents on the case that had survived, as well as interviewing several people who had lived when the fish-man had purportedly appeared (Feijoo wrote around 1720, so many people living in 1674 could have told him the tale). He finally concluded that, as far as the facts were concerned, a fish-man had appeared in Cadiz, had been taken to Liérganes, and lived there for some time before disappearing again. He quoted several sources of which, being educated people, he seemed confident enough, including the Marquis of Valbuena (a finely educated nobleman from Santander), don Gaspar Melchor de la Riba Agüero (a knight from the Order of Santiago from Gajano, a town near Liérganes), and don Dionisio Rubalcava from Solares, who allegedly knew and met Francisco de la Vega.

The fame of Feijoo as an extremely rigorous writer who bitterly criticized superstition and frauds was such that it has been argued that the story could somehow be true, as it seems unlikely Feijoo would have backed it without having good reasons to do so. Still, stories about fish-men being captured were not unheard of in Europe, nor in Spain, where writers such as Joviano Potano, Alejandro de Alejandro and Pedro Mexía had already written about similar stories and in the second part of the Lazarillo de Tormes stories where the grown Lazaro is caught by fishermen after almost drowning in a storm and who exhibit him as a sea monster throughout Spain until he escapes. Apparently, Feijoo somehow believed in the existence of fish-men, as he later further extended his views offering a set of scientific arguments backing his claim.

Gregorio Marañón, a reputed 20th century Spanish scholar and physician, argued that whereas the story about the fish-man itself was undoubtedly false, the amount of testimonies offered by Feijoo and others related to the fish-man of Liérganes could not be promptly discarded. According to him, several elements in the tale such as the creature being almost mute and unable to pronounce a word, his white skin, red hair, the scaly skin, the fact that he would allegedly bite his fingernails or that he would wander about are typical symptoms of cretinism, an illness which is endemic to mountainous regions and which was quite common in the Santander area at that time. He concluded that after having somehow wandered his way from Bilbao to Cadiz, he was probably found around a fishing area there and his strange appearance would have done the rest.

== See also ==
- List of people who disappeared mysteriously at sea
- Cola Pesce
