= Ojáncanu =

Giant in Cantabrian mythology

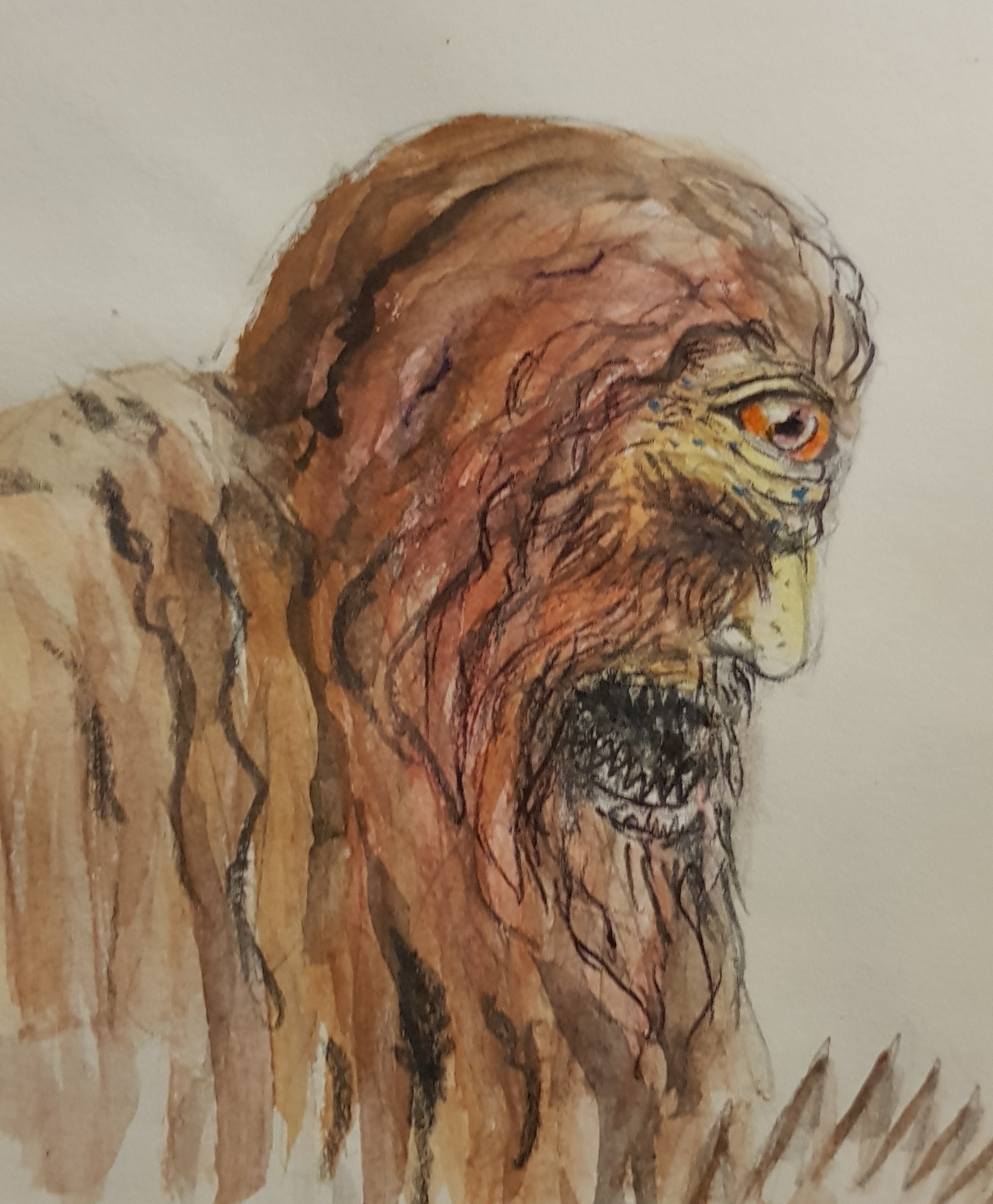
Ojáncanu

The Ojáncanu (Cantabrian: [oˈhankanu]) is a cyclops-like giant found in Cantabrian mythology, and is an embodiment of cruelty and brutality.

== Mythology ==
It appears as a 10 to 20 ft. one-eyed giant with superhuman strength, with hands and feet that contain ten digits each, and two rows of teeth. With a very wild and beast-like temperament, it sports a long mane of red hair, and just as much facial hair, with both nearly reaching to the ground. Apparently the easiest way of killing an Ojancanu is to pull the single white hair found in its mess of a beard. The females (called Ojáncana) are virtually the same, though without the presence of a beard. However, the females have long drooping breasts that like their male counterpart's hair, reach the ground. In order to run, they must carry their breasts behind their shoulders. The strangest thing about these peculiar cyclopean species is their reproduction process. Instead of mating when an old Ojancanu dies, the others distribute the insides and bury the corpse under an oak or yew tree. He is constantly doing evil deeds such as pulling up rocks, destroying huts and trees, and blocking water sources. He fights Cantabrian brown bears and Tudanca bulls, and always wins. He only fears the Anjanas, the good Cantabrian fairies.
