= Kota Shrine (Niigata) =

Shinto shrine in Jōetsu, Niigata prefecture, Japan

- 居多神社
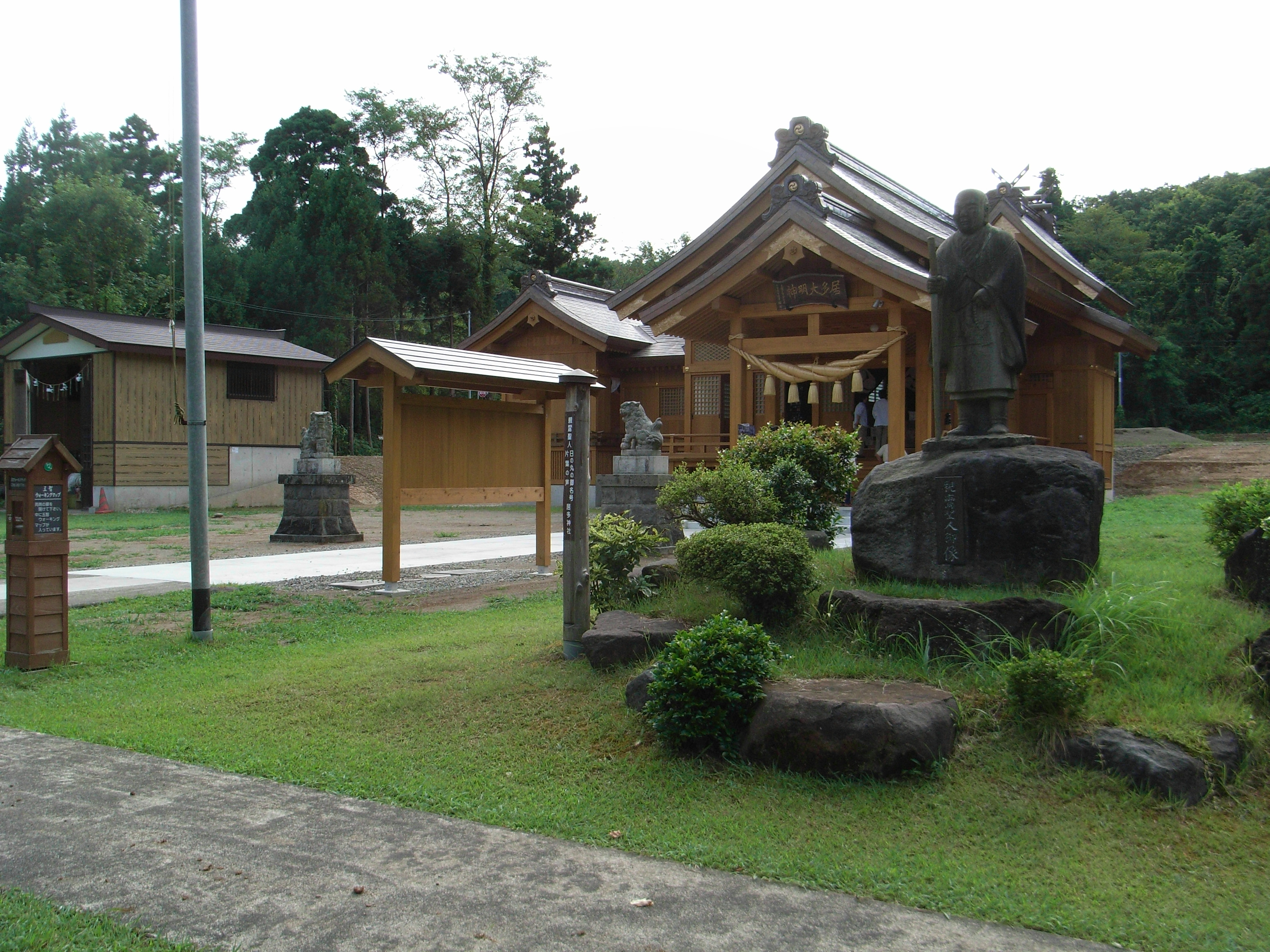
- Kota Shrine with statue of Shinran to right

- Kota Jinja Kota Shrine (Niigata) (Japan)

Religion
- Affiliation: Shinto
- Deity: Ōkuninushi; Nunakawahime
- Festival: May 3
- Type: Ichinomiya

Location
- Location: 1-11 Gochi 6-chōme, Jōetsu-shi, Niigata-ken 942-0081
- Interactive map of Kota Shrine
- Coordinates: 37°9′59.32″N 138°13′23.50″E

Kota Shrine (居多神社, Kota-jinja) is a Shinto shrine located in the Gochi neighborhood of the city of Jōetsu, Niigata Prefecture. It is one of the three shrines claiming the title of ichinomiya of former Echigo Province. The main festival of the shrine is held annually on May 3.

== Enshrined kami ==
The kami enshrined at Kota Jinja are:

- Ōkuninushi no mikoto (大国主命)
- Nunagawahime no mikoto (奴奈川姫命)
- Takeminakata no mikoto (建御名方命)
- Kotoshironushi no mikoto (事代主命)

== History ==
The origins of Kota Shrine is unknown. Similarly named shrines, such as the Keta Taisha in Noto Province, are distributed in a relatively small area along the Sea of Japan coastline of the Hokuriku region and all are believed to have a connection with migrants from the Izumo area in the Kofun period. The first known documentary mention of Kota Shrine is in the Nihon Kōki chronicle dated 813 AD, when it was recorded that the shrine was granted the rank of Junior 5th Rank, Lower Grade (従五位下). Per the Nihon Sandai Jitsuroku, it was promoted to Junior 4th Rank, Lower Grade in 861 AD and its name appears in the Engishiki records compiled in 927 AD as a major shrine of ancient Kubiki County in Echigo. In 1207 AD, the Buddhist prelate Shinran sought refuge at this shrine after he was exiled from Kyoto for his promotion of Pure Land Buddhism. During the Muromachi period, the shrine was patronized by the powerful Uesugi clan and was named the ichinomiya of Echigo Province notwithstanding the fact that the Yahiko Shrine had an existing and much older claim to that title. During the Sengoku period, the shrine was burned down in 1533 during battle between rival factions of the Uesugi clan and was rebuilt by Nagao Tamekage only to be destroyed again during the Siege of Otate in 1578. It was granted a fief of 13 koku in 1599 for its upkeep, which the Tokugawa shogunate increased to 100 koku in 1611. Following the Meiji restoration, with the establishment of State Shinto in 1872, the shrine was originally designated as a "county shrine", but was later raised in status to that of a prefectural shrine (県社) in 1873. Due to coastal erosion, the shrine was relocated about one kilometer inland to its present location in 1879. The shrine burned down in 1902, and a temporary structure was built in 1907, which was only replaced with a new shrine building in 2008.

The shrine is located about five minutes by car from Naoetsu Station on the JR East Shin'etsu Main Line.

== Gallery ==
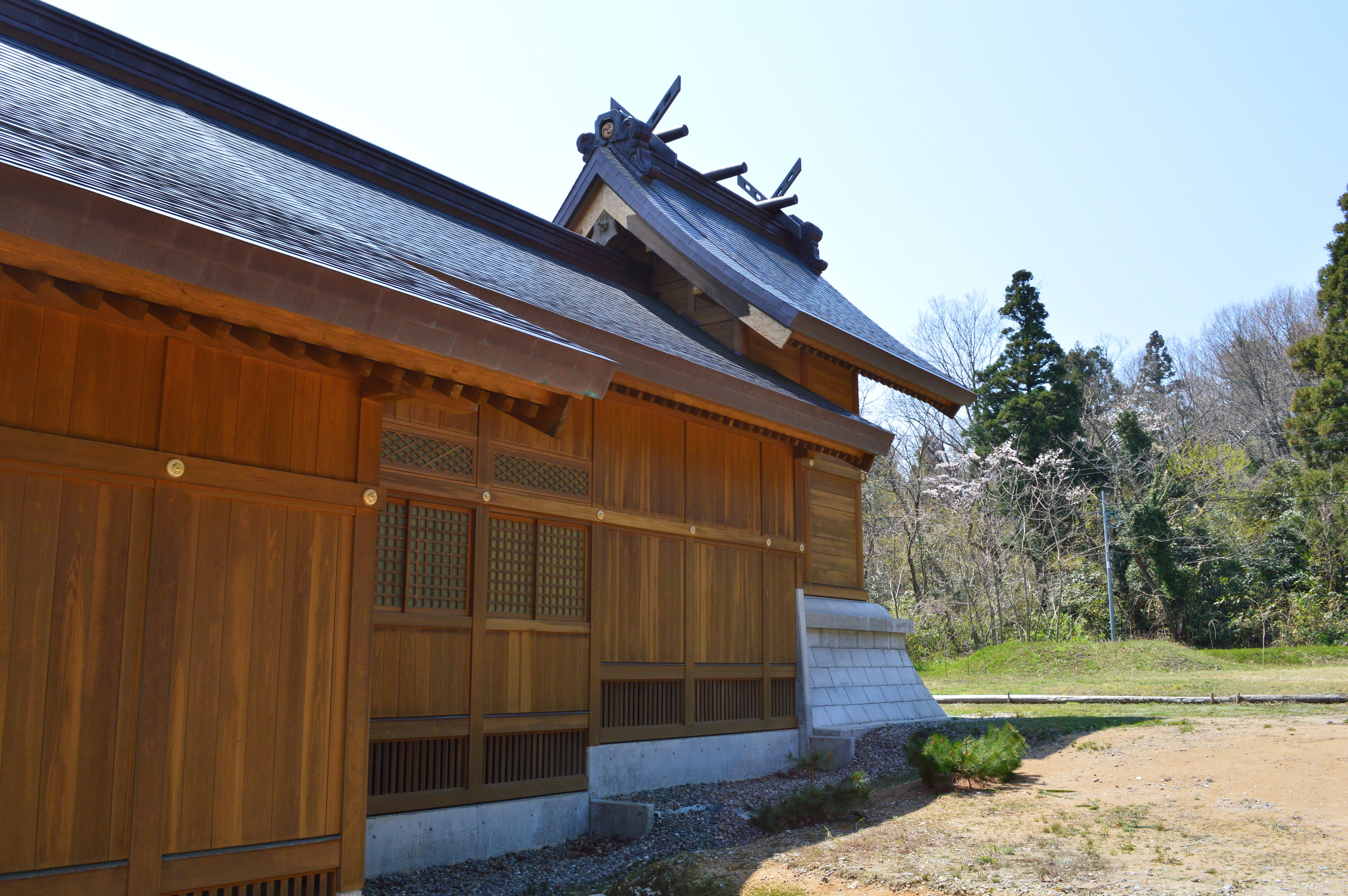
Honden

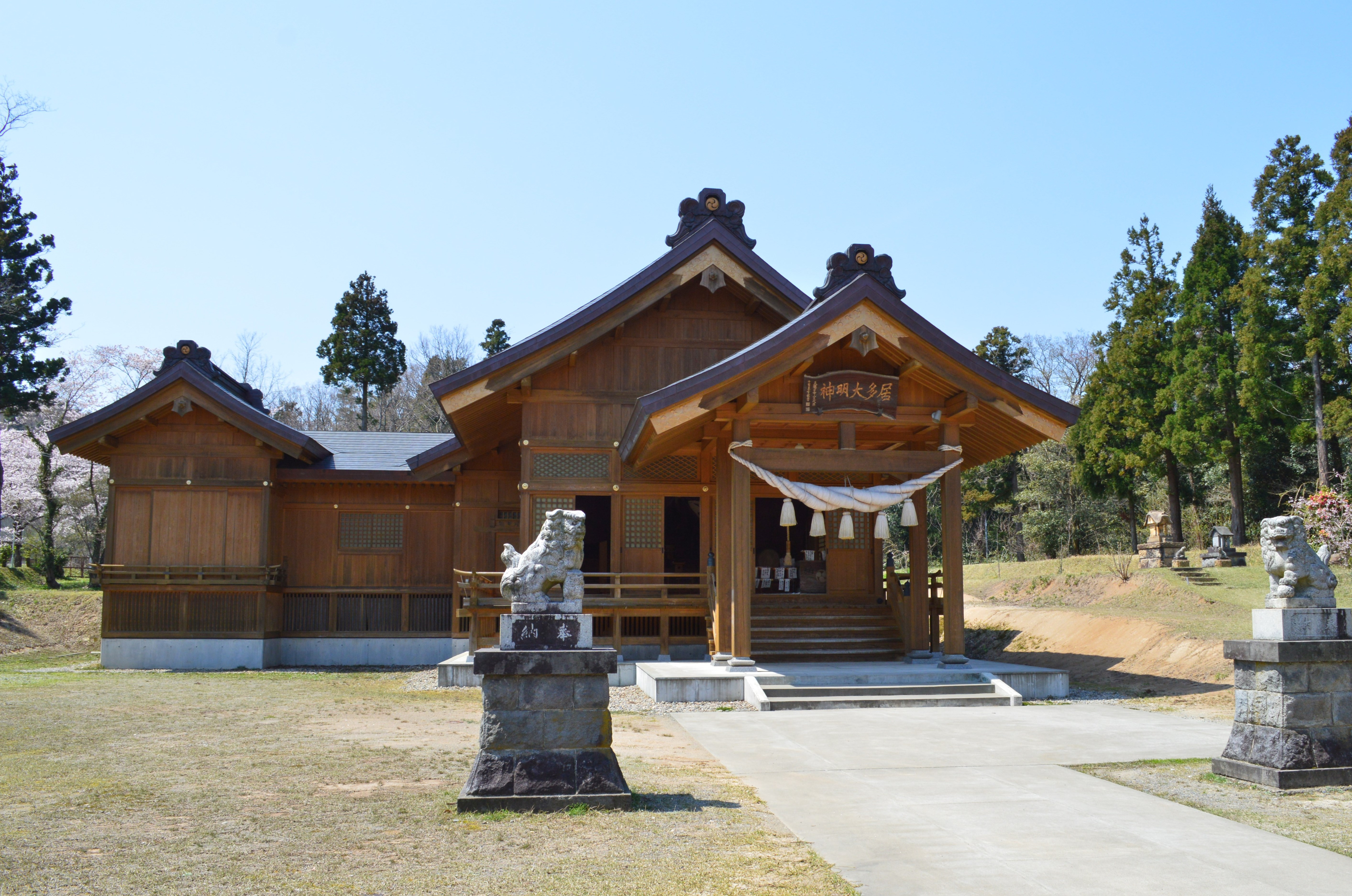
Shaden

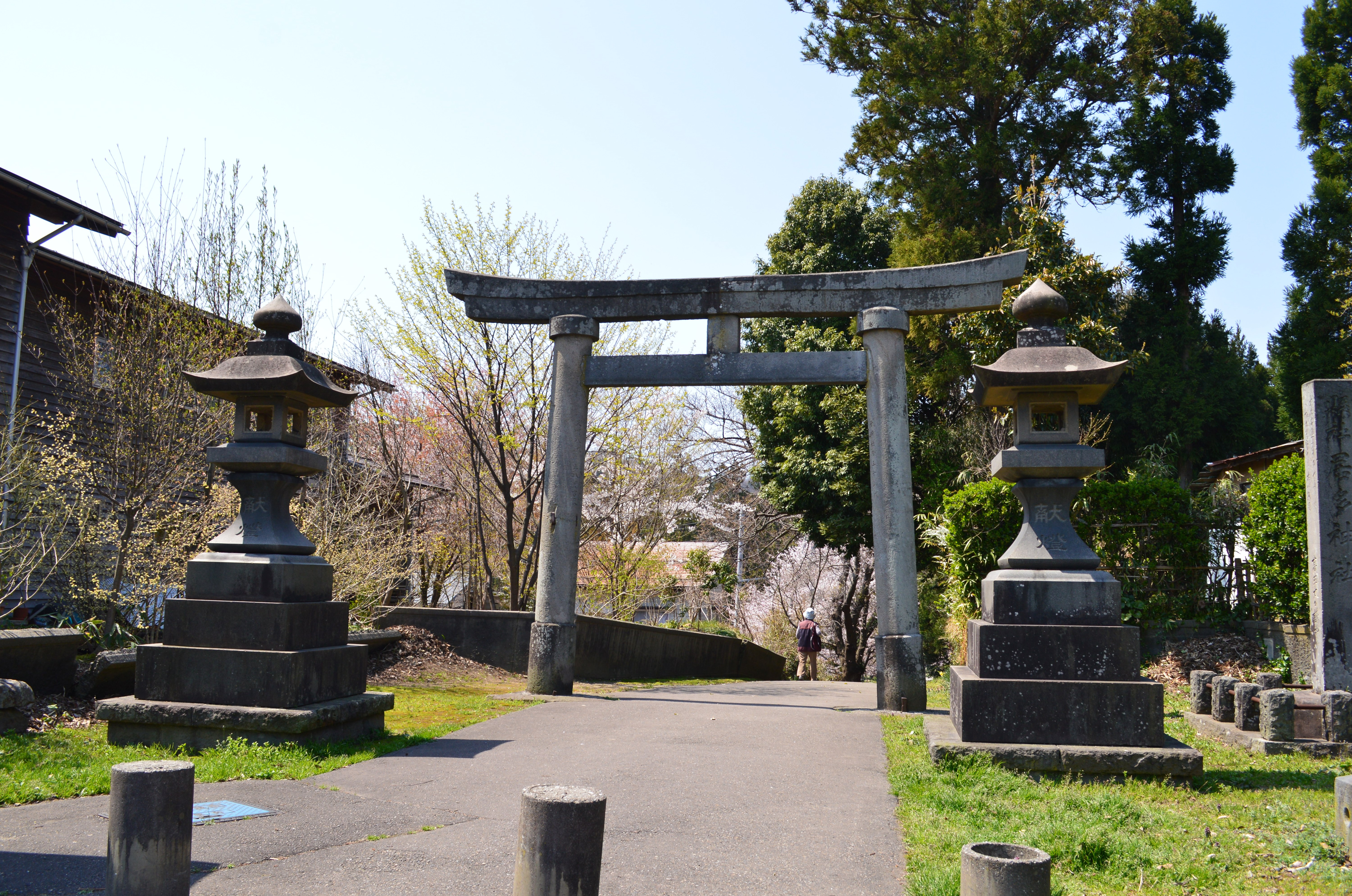
Torii

== See also ==
- Ichinomiya
- List of Shinto shrines in Japan
- Seven mysteries of Echigo
