= Erudinus =

Pagan god in Cantabrian mythology

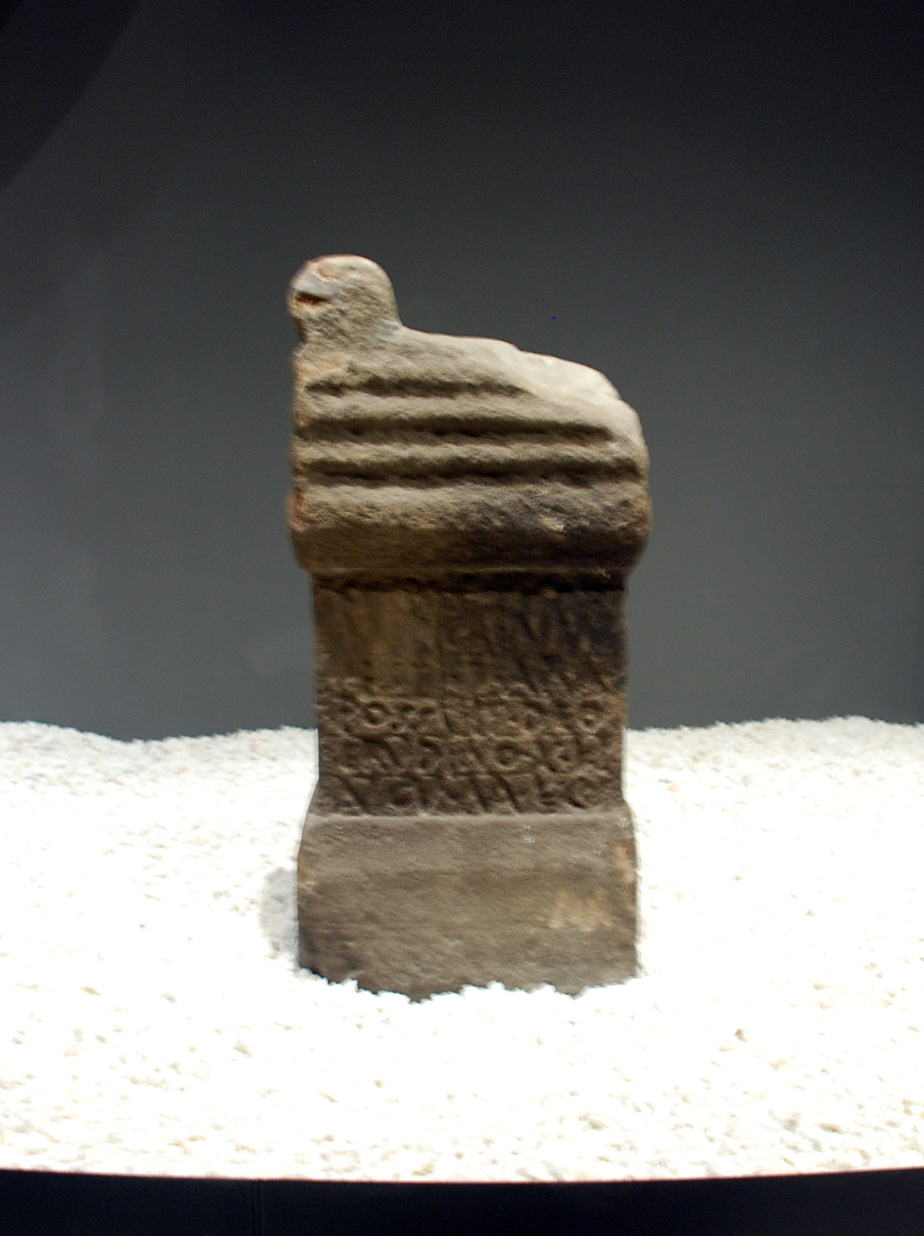
The altar to Erudinus.

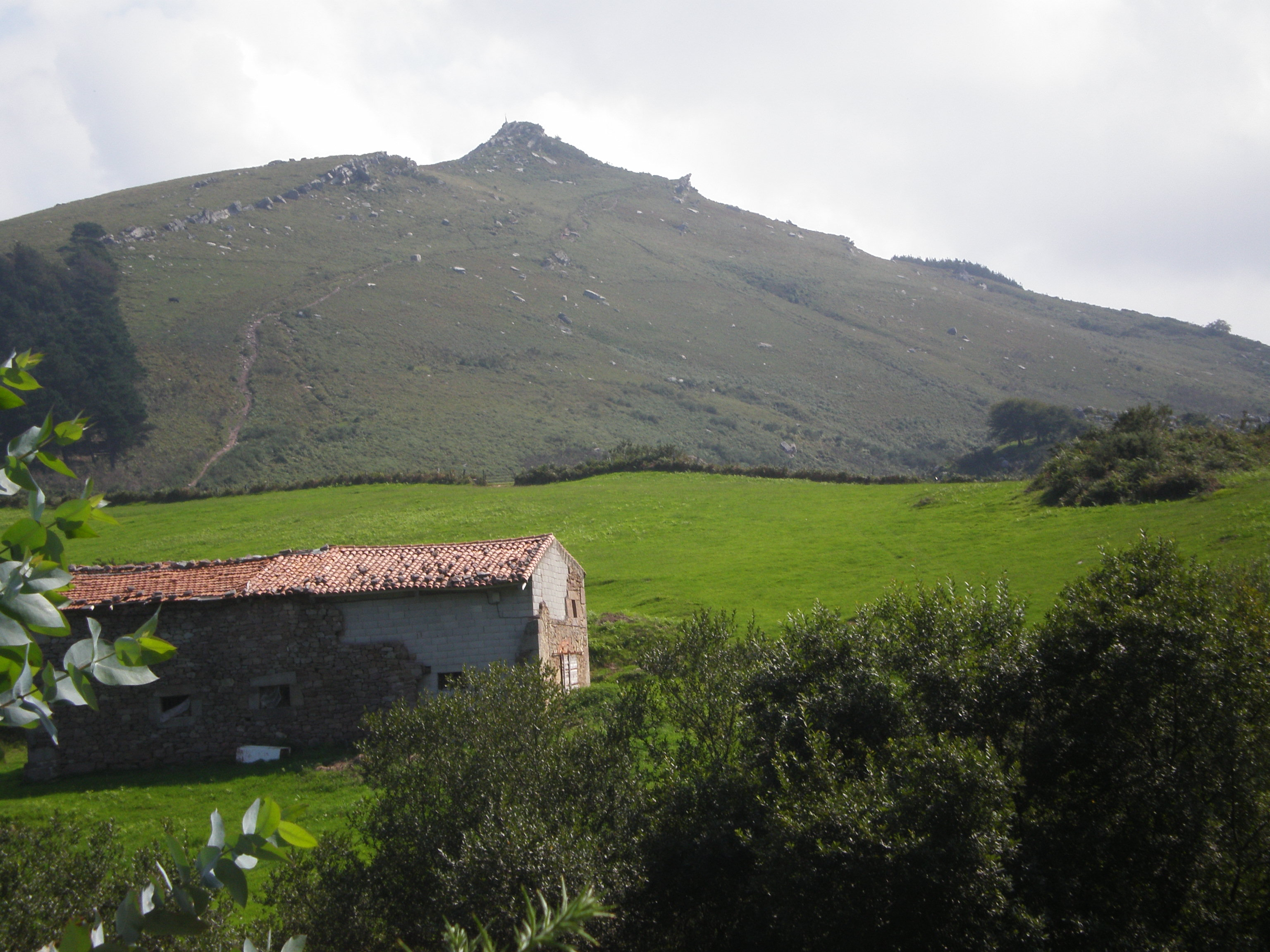
Dobra peak.

Erudinus (Latin: [erʊˈdiːnʊs]), Erudinu (Cantabrian: [eɾuˈðinu]) or Erudino (Spanish: [eɾuˈðino]) was a pagan god in Cantabrian mythology. A stone altar with an inscription dated from the year 161 (originally believed to date from 399) was found in 1925 by Hermilio Alcalde del Río at the Monte Dobra, near Torrelavega (Cantabria). The inscription says:

CORNE(lius) VICANVS / AVNIGAINV(m) / CESTI(i) F(ilius). ARA(m) / POSSVIT. DEO / ERVDINO. X. K(alendas)/ AVGV(stas). MA(llio). EV(tropio) CO(n)s(ulibus).

The altar forms part of the stock of the Museum of Prehistory and Archaeology of Cantabria, while a replica is installed in a green zone at Sierrapando. From 2001 to 2012, this reproduction remained in the Serafin Escalante street in Torrelavega.
