= Ramidreju =

Cantabrian mythological creature

In Cantabrian mythology, a ramidreju (Cantabrian: [ramiˈdrehu]) is a creature said to inhabit the mountains and forests of Cantabria in northern Spain. This animal, which resembles a weasel, is born once every hundred years from a weasel or a marten. These mythological creatures have a very long body, like a snake, and their fur is slightly green-colored. Its eyes are yellow, its nose is like that of a hog and its tusks are like those of the boar, which it uses to dig very deep holes. Ramidrejus are a very sought-after animal in Cantabrian folklore because their fur heals every sickness and the animal has a strong desire for gold.

== See also ==
- Kamaitachi, another species of mythological weasel from Japan
