= Caballucos del Diablu =

Mythological beings from Cantabria

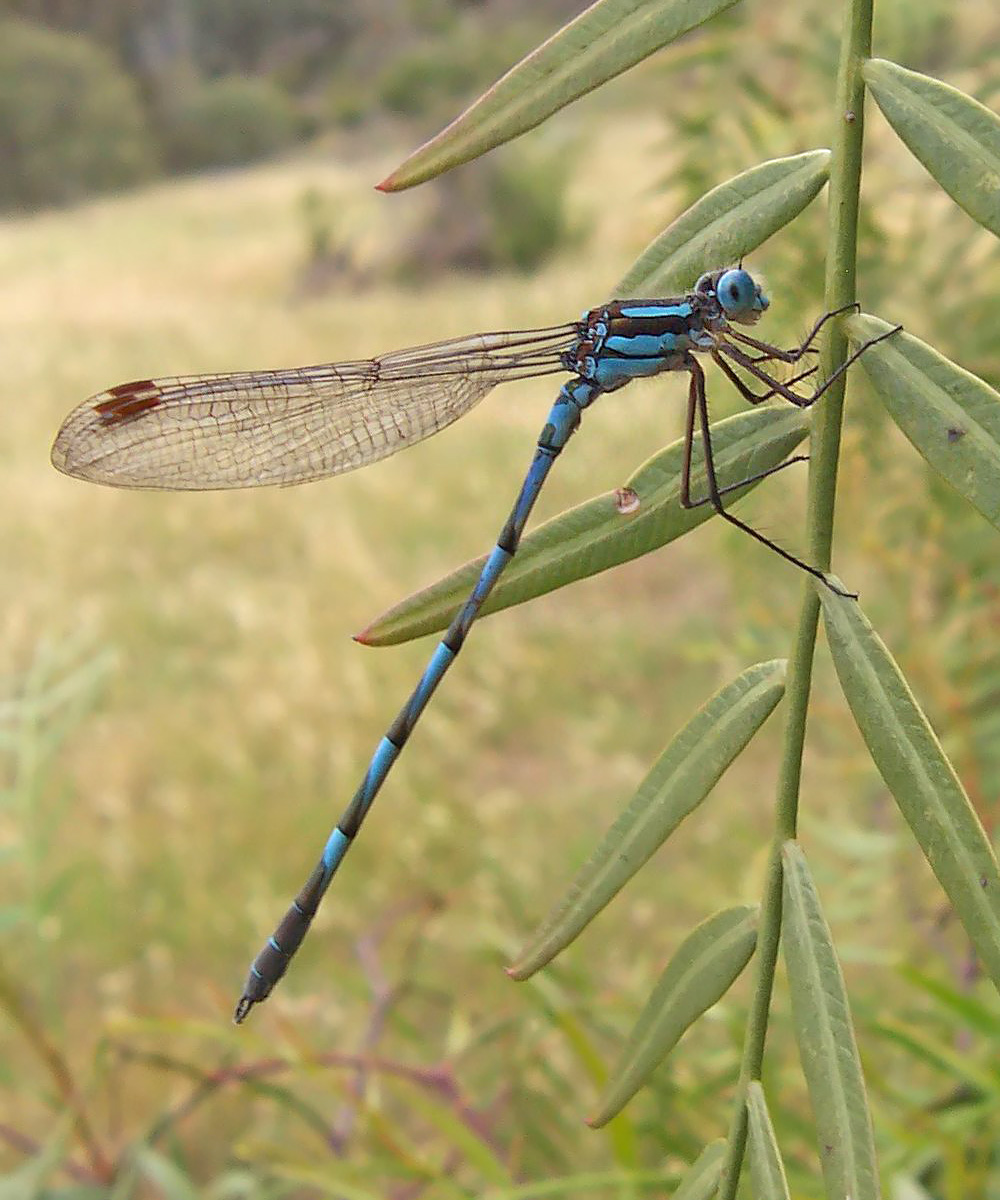
Damselfly suborder Zygoptera which is identified with Caballucos del Diablu.

The Caballucos del Diablu (Cantabrian for "(little) horses of the devil") is a myth from the Cantabrian mythology, a region of northern Spain.

On St John's Eve (June 23) at night; when the people make bonfires to purify their souls, horses (Percheron purebred) with damselfly wings, black manes and foaming mouths appear amongst the ashes. These stallions -the Caballucos- are the souls of sinners, damned to roam Cantabria for eternity, come to release their fury over a year's worth of sins, creating a rumbling explosion with fire accompanied by terrifying screams.

The Caballucos del Diablu appear in a variety of colors, each one being the soul of a different sinner, as legends highlight. The red horse was a man who lent money to farmers and then used dirty tricks to steal their properties; the white one a miller who stole many thousands of dollars from his master; the black one a hermit who played tricks on people; the yellow one a corrupt judge; the blue one an innkeeper; and the orange one a child who abused his parents; the green one a lord who possessed many lands and dishonoured plenty of young women. It is said that the Devil himself roams the streets riding the red fire-breathing steed, the sturdiest and most powerful who leads the raid, while other demons ride the rest. The force in their stomping is such that their horseshoes leave prints on rocks, as if they were freshly ploughed soil. They have gleaming eyes, and blow a strong wind with their nostrils to try impeding lovers from giving corsages to the girls. The huffs, as cold as winter, are strong enough to make leaves fall from trees and bushes. The horses’s food are shamrocks, with they eat tastefully, probably to prevent the seekers who come out at night from finding any. The Caballucos pounce on everyone they come across, the only things that repels them is a bunch of vervain that the person can carry along; the plant has to be collected the day before though, or should be placed next to St John’s fire, to which they won’t come near. The locals note that sometimes, after becoming worn out by the search, the Caballucos stop to rest and their saliva drips on the ground, and turns into gold ingots. Whoever takes them will be made extremely wealthy, but will descent straight to hell after death.
