= Eliseo Nicolás Alonso =

Asturian sculptor and wood carver (1955–2012)

Lise
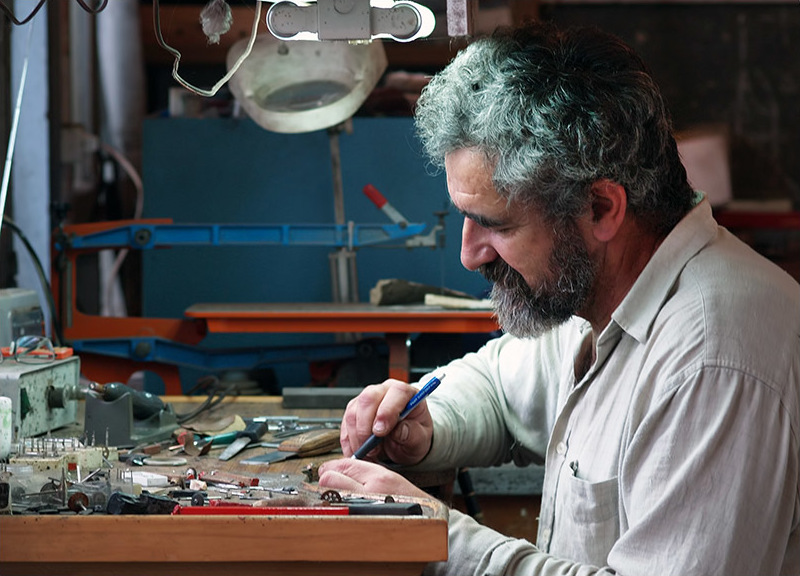
- Lise at work in 2006
- Born: Eliseo Nicolás Alonso; 15 February 1955; Agones, Pravia, Spain
- Died: 2 June 2012 (aged 57); Pereda, Grado, Asturias, Spain
- Known for: Woodcarving; sculpting jet (lignite)

Eliseo Nicolás Alonso (15 February 1955 – 2 June 2012) was an Asturian artisan who was known as Lise and mainly by his work with jet. He was a sculptor and woodcarver.

== Biography ==
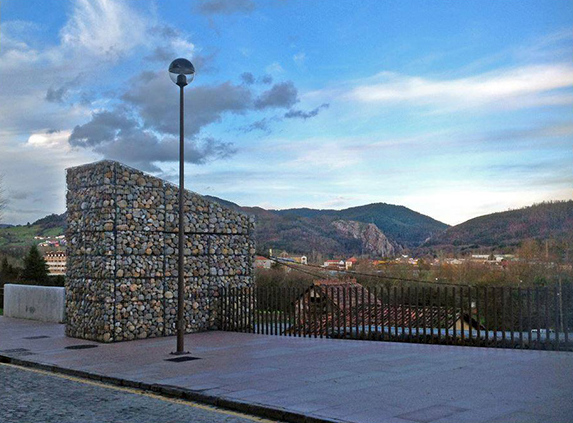
Plaza Eliseo Nicolás "Lise", Maestro Azabachero, inaugurated in the year 2014.

Eliseo Nicolás Alonso was born in Agones, Pravia and lived with his family in the school-house of Reconco. He was an artisan who could be considered an artist. His workshop was in the lower level of his home.

He was trained as a General Basic Education Teacher, but did not practice. He had an early inclination for the plastic arts. Lise was self-taught, and first used clay and wood as the materials to study forms. His first exposition for wood carving was in 1973.

He died 2 June 2012 in Pereda, Grado, Asturias

== Work ==
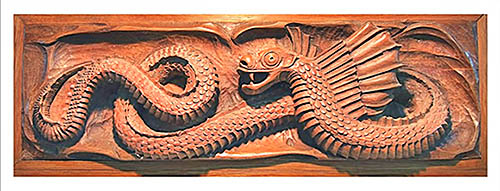
Woodcarving of ”el Cuélebre”; Asturian mythology: a small sculpture of an owl made of Asturian jet, and wood (Buxus and Taxus).

The need to find large pieces of jet, and the unavailability of the gem, made him inquire about mixtures, taraceas, and other materials such as fine woods, gold, silver, ivory, etc. chosen by considering their colors and hues, as well as their hardness, all to be compatible with the main material of choice which was jet.

Of his first works as a woodcarver, the technique displayed on the staff from the Spanish municipality, the Ayuntamiento de Candamo is worth noting, as well as his carving at the Capilla de Dolores in Grado, with its bells made of jet.

Later, he became recognized because of his new techniques which included work embedding, pouring or combining materials which included fine woods and ivory. Prior to his work, the work done on jet was limited to carving and embellishing with precious metals. Of his notable works in jet, the piece "San Miguel de Lillo" reflects the pre-Roman Asturias.

== Bibliography ==
- In children's literature, the 2002 novel: "Caracoles, Pendientes y Mariposas" (meaning: "snails, slopes and butterflies") won the award: “XIII Premio Ala Delta de la Editorial Edelvives 2002”, and who the author is Blanca Álvarez. Supposedly Eliseo Nicolás Alonso, Lise, is the novelized protagonist. ISBN 84-263-4908-0.
- Text quoted and images included in: "Azabacheria Asturiana". Carreño, Valentín Monte. ISBN 84-606-2668-7 (1995). (Pages: 89, 117, 124 & 133).
- Text quoted and images included in: "El Azabache, Piedra Mágica, Joya, Emblema Jacobeo". Carreño, Valentín Monte. ISBN 84-933551-0-0 (2004). (Pages: 2-173-174).
- "El Castillo de Curiel y su territorio". Menéndez, Andrea Menéndez. ISBN 84-89880-77-8 (2003). (Page: 269).
