= Cola Pesce =

Italian folktale

Cola Pesce, also known as Pesce Cola (i.e., "Nicholas Fish") is an Italian folktale about a merman, mentioned in literature as early as the 12th century. Many variants and retellings have been recorded.

== Early literature ==
The first known literary mention was by a 12th-century poet, Raimon Jordon of Provencal, who was referred to a "Nichola de Bar" (Nicholas of Bari) who lived with the fishes.

Walter Map recorded a story of "Nicholas Pipe," who appeared like a normal human but had the ability to live under the sea for long periods of time, and would warn ships of storms. King William of Sicily commanded that he be brought to him, but Nicholas Pipe could not live away from the ocean and died when he was captured.

Gervase of Tilbury's version told of Nicholas Papa of Apulia, a skilled sailor who was sent by King Roger of Sicily to explore the bottom of the ocean, and reported seeing trees, valleys and mountains underwater.

== Folk versions ==
In a version from Palermo, edited by Italo Calvino, Nick Fish spends all of his time swimming, until his frustrated mother curses him to turn into a fish. He instantly becomes half fish, with duck feet and a frog's throat. He appears to fishermen and warns them of upcoming storms, and also informs them of the marvels found at the bottom of the sea. A king hears of him and summons him, then gives him orders to swim around the island and explore the bottom of the ocean. The king sends him down on numerous dives around Italy. Nick Fish discovers that Messina rests on three columns, some of which are broken, and brings back hot and fresh water from springs in the ocean around Naples. Finally the king urges Nick Fish to explore a bottomless ocean chasm, despite his resistance. He throws his crown into the chasm and orders him to fetch it. Nick Fish reluctantly dives in. Some lentils he was carrying float to the surface, but he never returns.

In another version, a boy named Cola or Nicholas is cursed by his mother to live in the water like a fish. He is interviewed by emperor Frederick II. In order to test his abilities, the emperor drops a golden cup into the sea, asking Cola to retrieve it. Refusing at first, Cola finally attempts the dive and is never seen again. This version is set in Messina, and was recorded there by priests; it spread to Barcelona when the Kingdom of Sicily was under the Crown of Aragon. It was first printed there, in a chapbook dated c. 1600.

=== Mallorca ===
In Mallorcan, the character is known as Peix Nicolau. Antoni Maria Alcover i Sureda collected several versions. The story has a similar beginning with Nicolau's love for the water and his mother's curse. After becoming a merman, Nicolau explores the sea and eventually wishes to swim the dangerous Saluet between Santa Margarita and Arta, but drowns in the crossing. In other versions, he is sometimes referred to as the king of the sea. Every March he returns briefly to the land to speak to sailors and see what has changed. In contrasting variants, catching sight of him was considered a bad omen; he would summon storms, and looking at his salt-reddened eyes could turn a sailor's hair white.

== Analysis ==
In 1904, Giuseppe Pitrè published an in-depth study of the tale, finding it to be a popular and well-known tale across Italy and Spain. Different versions of the tale were set in different areas, named different historical kings, and had the king order Cola Pesce to retrieve a cup, ring or crown. In some places in Italy, Nicholas's name was used as a bogeyman to frighten children. There were also stories of a dugong named Nicola. The fish-man of Liérganes, another tale of a man who liked to swim and became part fish, may be comparable.

Pitrè compared other tales of retrieving a king's trinket from the water, including a tale recorded by Pausanias of Theseus retrieving King Minos's ring. Pitrè theorized that the tale was developed from legends of Saint Nicholas of Bari, patron saint of mariners, who was described in many legends as calming storms and aiding sailors. Older inspiration may have come from sea gods like Neptune and folkloric water creatures like the Neck, Nökke or Nykur.

=== Tale type ===
In his 1961 revision of the international folktale index, American folklorist Stith Thompson grouped this cycle of stories, in the then Aarne-Thompson Index (henceforth, AT/AaTh), as tale type AT 434*, "The Diver and the Princess" and located variants only in Estonia. However, German folklorist Hans-Jörg Uther, in his 2004 revision, reformulated it as type ATU 434*, "The Diver (Cola Pesce)", of the Aarne-Thompson-Uther Index, and singled out the previous Estonian variants as its own oikotype.

According to Estonian scholarship, tale type ATU 434* is known in Estonia as Sukelduja ning kuningatütar ("The Diver and the Princess").

== In popular culture ==
- Friedrich Schiller's 1797 ballad "Der Taucher" ("The Diver") has been pointed out as a possible adaptation of this legend due to its strong similarities. However, Schiller was evidently unfamiliar with the name, perhaps indicating that he had heard a version where the main character was unnamed.
- Conrad Ferdinand Meyer wrote a sonnet titled "Nicola Pesce", first published in 1882.
- Robert D. San Souci’s 1997 picture book Nicholas Pipe is based on Walter Map’s version of the story. In the picture book, Nicholas Pipe is a merman who falls in love with a human woman, and she restores him to life with her tears.

== See also ==
- Fish-man

== Sources ==
- "El peix Nicolau" (paper). Revista Sàpiens. Sàpiens Publicacions [Barcelona], núm.131, Juliol 2013, p. 14.ISSN 1695-2014.
