= Fontes Tamarici =

Three springs in Velilla del Río Carrión, Spain

- Fuentes Tamáricas (Spanish)
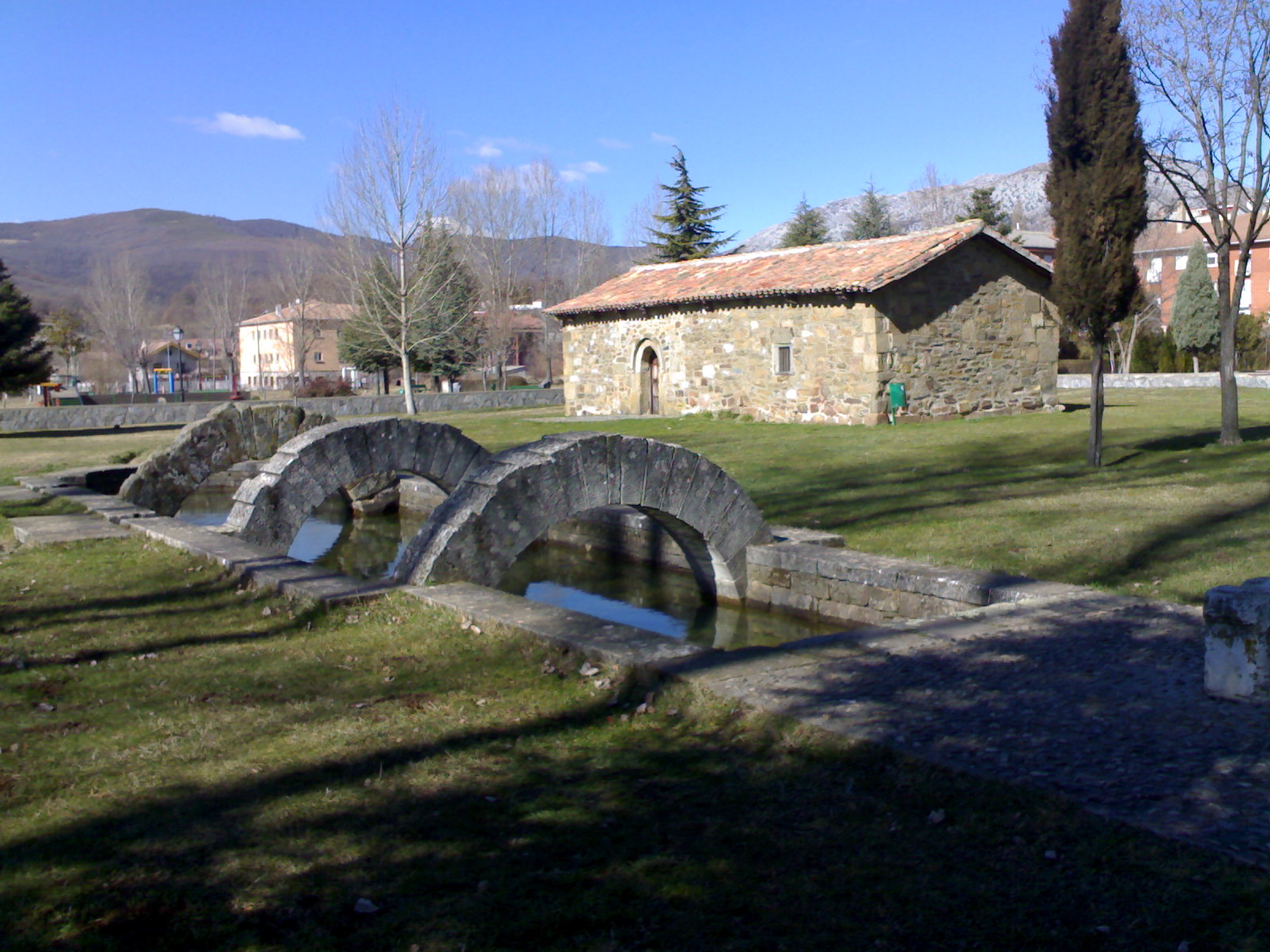
- Year: 1st century BC
- Type: Public fountain, oracle
- Medium: Stone
- Dimensions: 4.5 m × 2 m (15 ft × 6.6 ft)
- Location: Velilla del Río Carrión, Palencia, Spain; 42°49′24″N 4°50′45″W

The Fontes Tamarici, (Spanish: Fuentes Tamáricas, English: Tamaric Fountains), are three springs located by the geographer and Roman historian Pliny the Elder in classical Cantabria. Since the 18th century they have been identified with the source of La Reana in Velilla del Río Carrión, Palencia, Spain. The first mention of the spring, by Pliny, dates from the time of the Roman conquest of Cantabria. Pliny records that the springs were frequently dry, while other nearby springs continued to flow; he says that the springs being dry was considered to be a bad omen.

== History ==
The Tamarici, one of the tribes that made up the Cantabri, inhabited the area from the 3rd century BC. They worshiped waters and the sacred springs. The exact year of the construction of the Fontes Tamarici is unknown, but when the Roman Empire conquered Cantabria in 19 BC, they found these sources that drew wide attention. The outbreak irregular emptying its waters and unexpected, accompanied by the noise that precedes underground filling, had to be at that time matter of respect and adoration. Possibly they were used as baths, laundry and omen. It has been also suggested that the fountain could be dedicated to a god of the waters, where predictions were made based on their irregular filling and emptying cycle. In the thirteenth century it was built beside a hermitage devoted to John the Baptist, to Christianize the place and delete all relations with pagan rites.

== The curse of Pliny ==
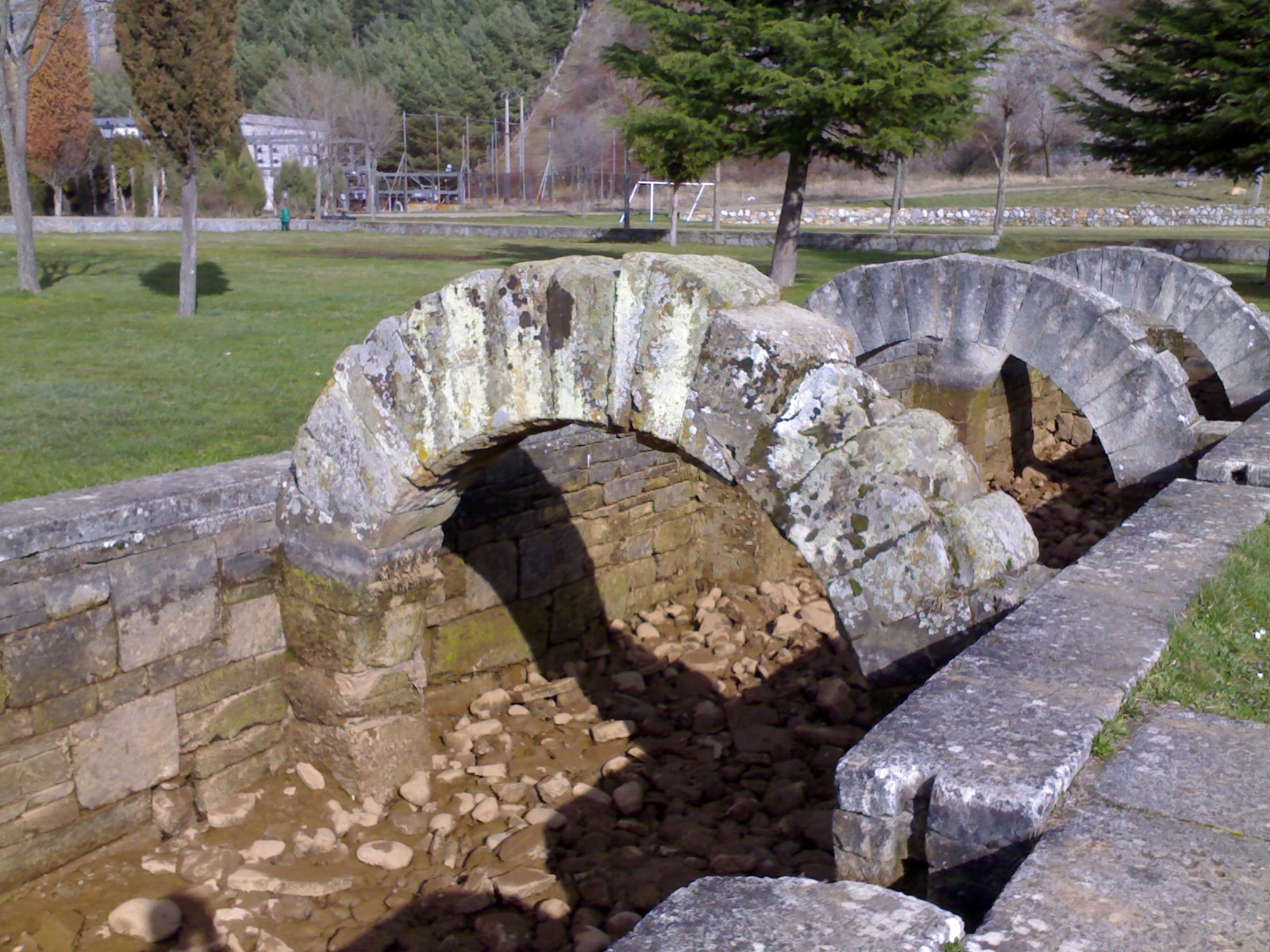
Detail of the original arch still preserved. The other two were rebuilt in the 1980s.

Studies of the naturalist and geographer Pliny the Elder on the lands occupied by the Roman Empire are crucial for knowledge and location of Tamaric Fountains. In his Naturalis Historiae, XXXI, 3, is where he alludes its particularity:

The sources, too, of the Tamaricus, a river of Cantabria, are considered to possess certain powers of presaging future events: they are three in number, and, separated solely by an interval of eight feet, unite in one channel, and so form a mighty stream. These springs are often dry a dozen times in the day, sometimes as many as twenty, without there being the slightest trace of water there: while, on the other hand, a spring close at hand is flowing abundantly and without intermission. It is considered an evil presage when persons who wish to see these springs find them dry: a circumstance which happened very recently, for example, to Lartius Licinius, who held the office of legatus after his prætorship; for at the end of seven days after his visit he died.

— Pliny the Elder, Naturalis historia, XXXI, 23, trans. John Bostock

Lartius Licinius was a great supporter of the work of Pliny, with his intense desire for knowledge of new discoveries, he visited the spring when it were in their dry phase, and died a week after in 70 AD.

== Polemics ==
The identification of La Reana with the Fontes Tamarici has been contested to the point that, as of 2023, it is highly doubtful that they have anything to do with those described by Pliny.

Fernández Acebo, after a critical study of both classic and historiographical sources, concludes that the adscription of La Reana to the Plinian fountain is wrong, arising from a faulty interpretation of the classical sources (Ptolemy, Strabo and Pomponius Mela) by the historian Enrique Flórez in the 18th century. Flórez, with the very limited material available at his time, confused two ancient polities, the Camarici and the Tamarici. Wrong identification of tribes led to wrong identification of places. This error was stablished as a fact without further examination, backed by Florez's reputation, until the end of the 20th century.

Under this false assumption, archaeologist García Bellido identified the Reana as the Plinian springs. This identification was soon followed by its declaration as historical monument ("Monumento Histórico") by the Ministry of National Education, eager to add some kind of touristic attraction to the zone. Much to the dismay of Bellido, the archaeological campaigns on site (1960-1961) yielded practically no Roman findings, but medieval ones, a fact which Bellido candidly acknowledges:

"The result of both (digging) campaigns results in an insufficient documentation of Roman presence in the spring".

The official designation as a historical monument was a point-of-no-return for Bellido, an honest and hardworking archaeologist, which left the matter as it was, not to contradict the Francoist authorities nor disenchant the locals with a retraction.

Fernández Acebo proposes that probabilities are high that real Fontes Tamarici might be the impressive intermittent river of La Fuentona ("The big Fountain") in Ruente, Cantabria (Spain) which fits neatly with Plinian description.
