= Anjana (Cantabrian mythology) =

Good fairies of Cantabria

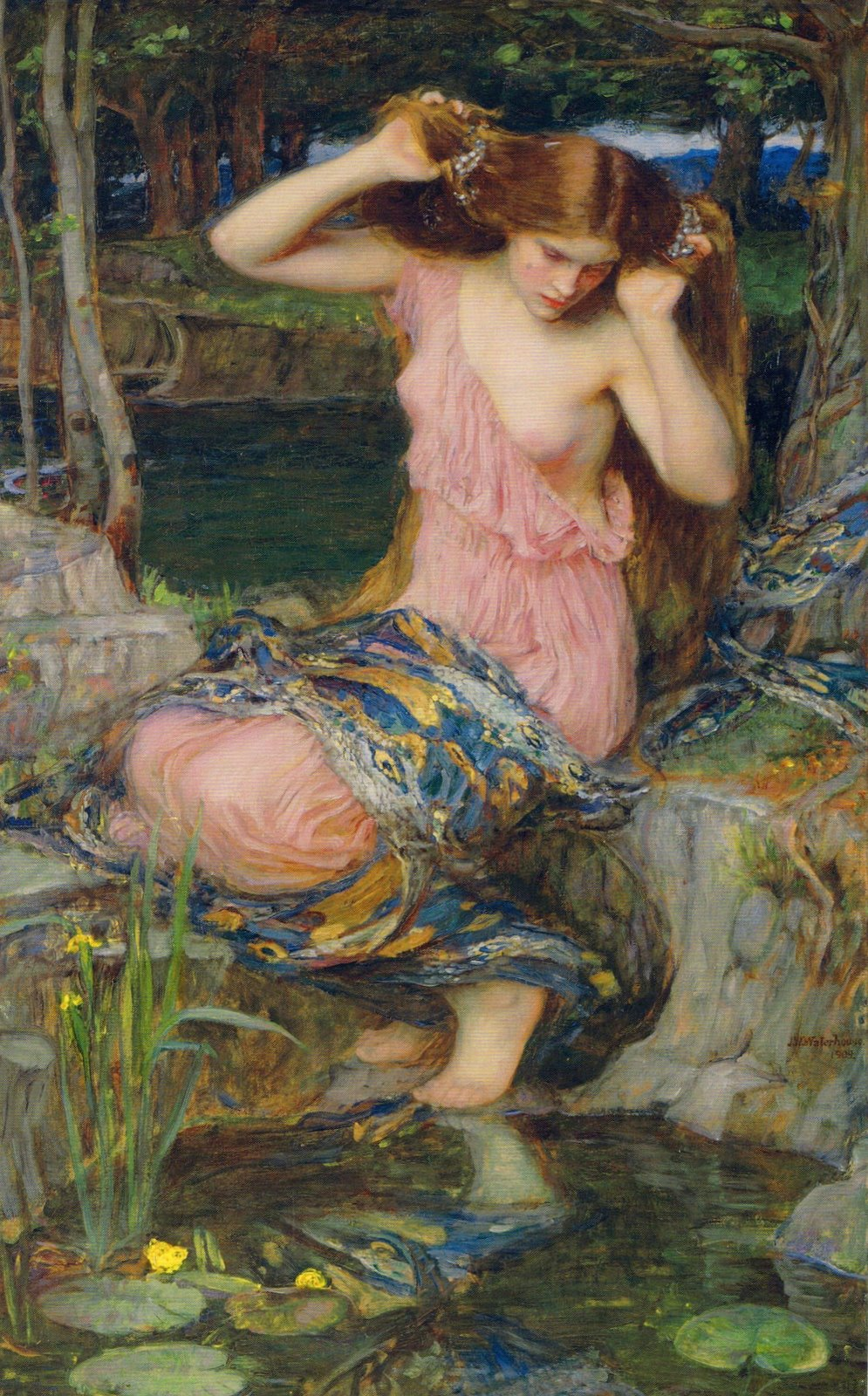
Lamia by John William Waterhouse, 1909.

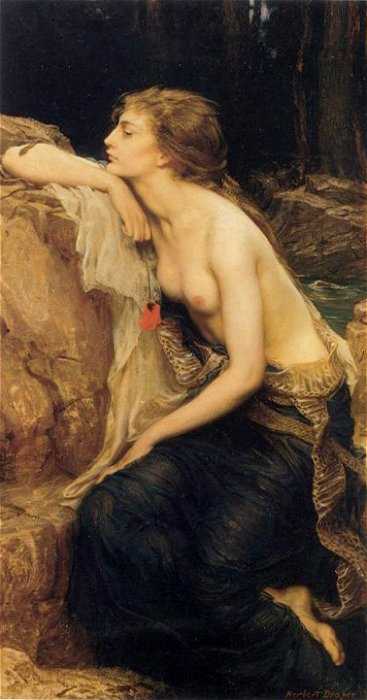
Lamia by Herbert James Draper, 1909.

The Anjana (Cantabrian: (Western) [anˈhana], (Eastern)[an.xa.nɜ]; Spanish: [anˈxana]) (from jana, a former word for witches during the Middle Ages) are one of the best-known fairies of Cantabrian mythology. These female fairy creatures foil the cruel and ruthless Ojáncanu. In most stories, they are the good fairies of Cantabria, generous and protective of all people. Their depiction in the Cantabrian mythology is reminiscent of the lamias in ancient Greek mythology, as well as the xanas in Asturias, the janas in León, and the lamias in Basque Country, the latter without the zoomorphic appearance.

== Representatives of God and tree spirits ==
Oral tradition provides different explanations for the nature of the Anjana. Some say they are heavenly beings sent by God to do good deeds, and they go back to heaven after 400 years, never to return. Others, however, indicate that they are spirits of trees who take care of the forests.

== Description ==
Anjana are described as beautiful and delicate, 0.5 ft (0.15 m) tall, with white skin and a sweet voice. Some are like a nightingale when they are happy, and others are like a beetle stepping on leaves in autumn. Their eyes are slanted, serene and loving, with black or blue pupils as bright as the stars, and they feature nearly transparent wings. They wear long, jet black or golden braids, adorned with multicolored silk bows and ribbons; a beautiful crown of wild flowers on their head; and a blue cape on a long thin white tunic, and carry in their hands a stick of wicker or hawthorn which shines in a different color every day of the week.

== Association with forest trails, water, and gift-giving ==
They are seen walking through the forest trails, resting on the banks of springs and on the margins of streams which then seem to come alive. They are able to talk with the water that flows from the sources and springs. They help injured animals and trees damaged by storms or Ojáncanu, lovers, people who lose their way in the forest, and the poor and suffering. Whenever they wander in villages, they leave gifts at the doors of helpful and kind people. When summoned for help they accept if the summoner is good of heart, but they also punish the wicked.

== Spring equinox ==
Traditions state that at night during the spring equinox, they gather in the fells and dance until dawn holding hands and scattering roses. Anyone who manages to find a rose with purple, green, blue, or golden petals will be happy until the time of their death.

== Similar fairies in Cantabrian tradition ==
Other Cantabrian-related fairies are the Hechiceras del Ebro (Enchantresses of the Ebro River), the Mozas del Agua (Water Lasses), the Viejuca de Vispieres (the Vispieres Little Old Woman), the Anjanas of Treceño, the Moras de Carmona (Moorish Maidens of Carmona) and the Ijanas del Valle de Aras (Ijanas of Aras Valley).

== The Anjanas and Christmas ==
Anjanas come to villages of the region during the night of January 5, with the intention of bringing children a variety of toys and gifts. This occurs every four years, generally to poor families, and still occurs annually in some areas of Cantabria.
