= Terrible Monster =

Mythical creature

Terrible Monster is a creature that allegedly attacked Jerusalem in the early 18th century. According to local lore, it was formed of the blood of murder victims and would kill anyone who came near it. The chimerical monster was said to be nearly 50 feet long, with the head of a lion, the beak and talons of an eagle, and the tail of a scorpion, with which venom was its principal weapon, much like a manticore. It was also completely covered with chain mail that appeared to be made from mother of pearl.

Its only weak point proved to be, not unlike The Chimera, having a spear flung down its throat.

It is known by no other name, aside from the translation.
