= Tek-ko-kui =

Bamboo forest near Eastern Yonghe (東永和), Chiayi County, Taiwan

Tek-ko-kui (Chinese: 竹篙鬼; Pe̍h-ōe-jī: Tek-ko-kúi; lit. 'bamboo ghost') is a legendary demon in Taiwanese folklore.

== Legend ==
It is said that they reside in bamboo forest. When someone wants to pass through the bamboo forest, the bamboo will bend and block the way. People can't step over, otherwise, the bamboo will hang people up in the air. The force is so great that it will kill or injure people. If stop moving forward, the bamboo will stand upright again. For example, there is a Tek-ko-kui living in the bamboo forest near the Kawabata Bridge (now Zhongzheng Bridge) in Taipei.

== See also ==
- Lists of legendary creatures
- Yōkai
