= Ventolín =

Creatures of Cantabrian mythology

The ventolines (Cantabrian: for little airs or little fans) are creatures of Cantabrian mythology. They are spirits of the air who help those who sail on the sea.

Ventolines are described as angels with large green wings and eyes as white as breaking waves. They live in the reddish clouds of the sunset.

When an old fisherman grew tired of raising his nets, ventolines came down from the sunset clouds and loaded the fish in the boat. They even wiped his sweat and sheltered him with their green wings when it was cold. Then they would take the oars and bring the boat to the docks. Other times, they would raise the sail, and if it was not windy, they blew inflating their cheeks and flying behind the boat making a breeze enough for the boat to sail.

Ventolines, ventolines,
ventolines of the sea,
this old man is tired
and can no longer row...

— Cantabrian popular prayer to the ventolines, 1930
