= Tailypo =

Mythical creature of North American folklore

Tailypo is a creature of North American folklore, particularly in Appalachia. Alternate names include Taileybone, Taileybones, Tailbones, Tallie Tale, Taily Po, Taileypo and Tailipoe.

== Creature ==
The Tailypo is usually said to be the size of a dog, though in some cases a cat. Depending on the storyteller, it has yellow or red eyes, a long tail, and pointed and/or tufted ears like a bobcat. It is nocturnal, covered in dark fur to blend into its environment. It only attacks with its claws, suggesting it is not a "versatile" demon or spirit, but it can and does speak in some form of English, meaning it can't simply be an animal. In some versions, it is described as a trickster soul.

It speaks some English, demanding the return of its tail (the actual phrase varies from version to version, but always repeats).

== Setting ==
The story is almost always set at night in a heavily wooded rural area. Geographically the setting is accepted to be somewhere in the American South. The events could feasibly occur at any time period, given the isolation and atmosphere of the tale.

The main events occur in a log cabin deep in the woods where a hermit and his three dogs live.

== Story ==
During a season of considerable hunger and a lack of suitable game, the tale begins with a hermit and his three hounds. The man is out at night, looking for the evening meal, and manages to shoot a small hare, which he shares with his dogs. Understandably still hungry, the man presses on and discovers a bizarre shape with bright eyes and a long tail. The hermit quickly shoots at the creature, severing its tail. Screaming, the creature runs off into the darkness and the man eats the tail, either raw or in stew.

On the brink of sleep, a rustling and clawing wakes the man. Sitting up, the hermit is able to see the gleaming eyes of the Tailypo leering at him from the foot of his bed. In an otherworldly voice, the creature demands the return of its "tailypo". Terrified, the man calls for his hounds, which immediately come to his aid, chasing the beast off into the night.

With the creature chased back into the woods, two of the hermit's dogs return, but one remains missing. The man tries to sleep, but the Tailypo soon returns, beckoning even more forcefully for the return of its tail. Again, the man sics his hounds on the Tailypo, and again, one is missing upon the return of the survivor. Unable to sleep, the man clutches his weapon (usually a gun of some kind) and waits for dawn, his remaining dog nearby. When the Tailypo appears for the third time, the man once again orders the hound to attack the Tailypo. Predictably, the dog chases the creature away and does not return.

The man, now left with no real protection, having exhausted his three hounds, cowers under his bedsheets, praying for dawn. Hours before daybreak, the man hears the familiar rustling sound, hoping that it is one of his dogs. Unfortunately, the man is leapt upon by the Tailypo and is either disarmed or has dropped his weapon in terror. The beast is now eye-to-eye with the man, and it demands once more the return of his "tailypo".

Most commonly, the man is described as being flayed beyond recognition by the Tailypo. In less explicit versions, all that remains of the cabin is the chimney. Either way, it is understood that the Tailypo has exacted revenge for the loss of its tail. During the darkest of nights, the creature can be heard whispering for its "tailypo" (or claiming, whisperingly, that it has gotten its "tailypo" back).

== Variations ==
The Tailypo legend has countless variations, many of which are passed down orally. The theme of a hungry man and his dogs hunting for food by their old cabin is constant. However, the methods used by the man to defend himself vary from axes to rifles. Also, the man's dogs sometimes simply get "lost" or just flee in fright, instead of being eaten or killed by the Tailypo. Sometimes, the dogs chase the creature into a swamp and then disappear, with the suggestion that they were lured into the swamp to be killed. In some variants, the Tailypo does actually enter the cabin through a hole in the floor, as opposed to being found in the woods. The season is accepted to be late Autumn but this too varies. Usually, these variations depend most heavily on the target audiences, with grisly embellishments removed for younger listeners. In some versions, the man's dogs are named (in order of disappearance) Uno, Ino, and Cumptico-Calico. In other versions the dogs are named (in order of appearance) Best, All-Right, and Fair.

== Analysis ==
The legend has been described as revolving around common anxieties for rural families in Appalachia, such as the fear of isolation or famine. It can also be seen as a cautionary tale, teaching children not to abuse animals.
