= Kota Shrine (Miyazaki) =

Shinto shrine in Miyazaki Prefecture, Japan

Kota-jinja
- 巨田神社
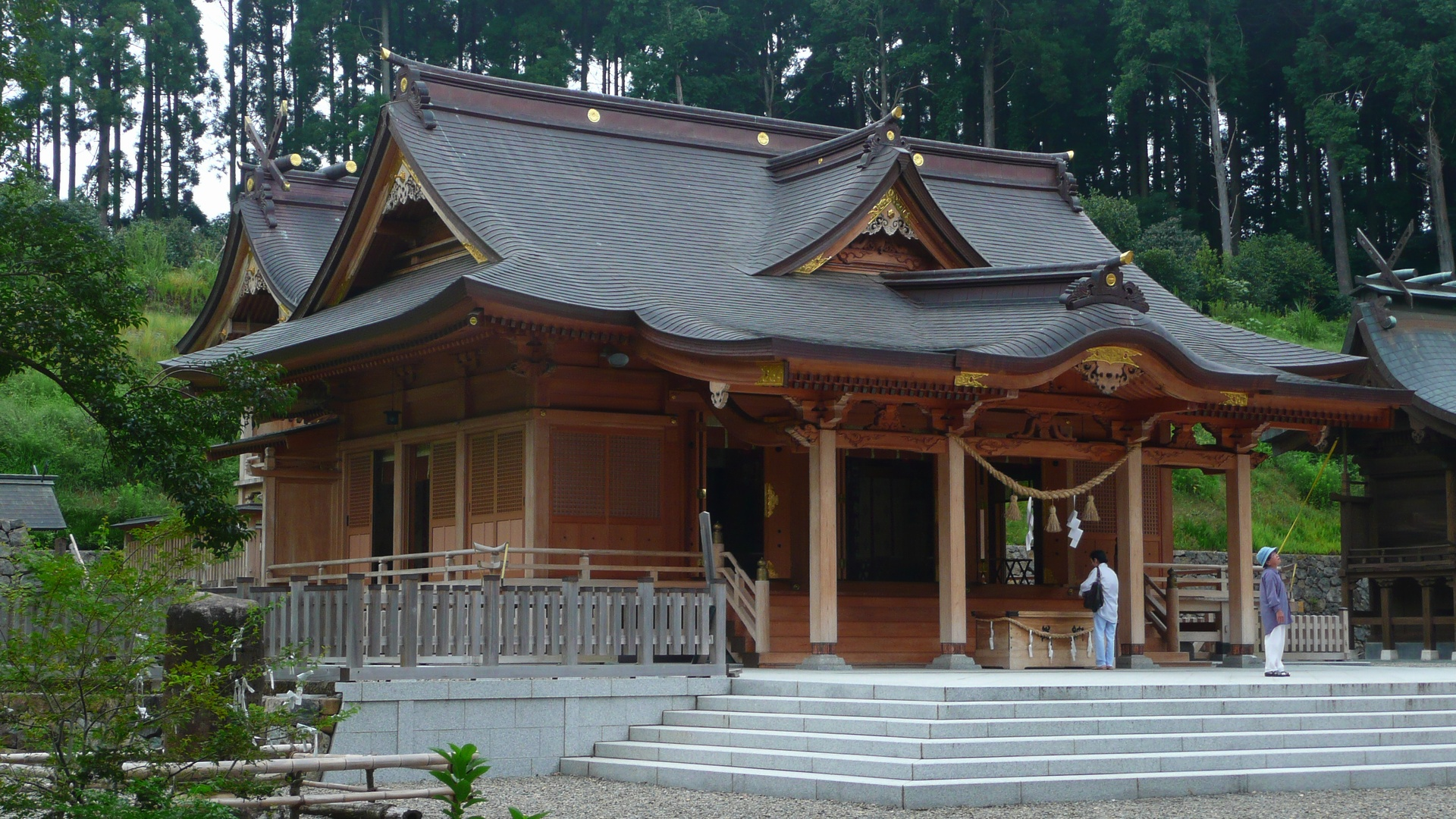
- Tsuno shrine (2009)

- Location within Japan

Religion
- Affiliation: Shinto
- Deity: Futodama; Empress Jingū; Emperor Ōjin

Location
- Location: 10372-2, Sadowachō Kamitajima, Miyazaki; Miyazaki 880-0301
- Interactive map of Kota-jinja
- Coordinates: 32°03′28″N 131°24′13″E

Architecture
- Established: 1093; 933 years ago

Website
- archives.bunkenkyo.or.jp/national/kota/index.html

Kota-jinja (巨田神社) is a Shinto shrine located in Miyazaki, Miyazaki Prefecture, Japan. It is dedicated to Futodama, Empress Jingū and Emperor Ōjin.
