= Trenti =

The Trenti is an imp-like creature that comes from the Cantabrian mythology, northern Spain. This annoying but not malicious goblin is very difficult to see because it lives deep in the forest and resembles mushrooms, leaves, and moss. Its most distinguishing features are a completely black face with green eyes. This creature tends to stay away from humans but it does like to jump out of the bushes and scare innocent walkers. Its favorite prank is to pull women's skirts.
