= Yuta (shaman) =

Ryukyuan shamans

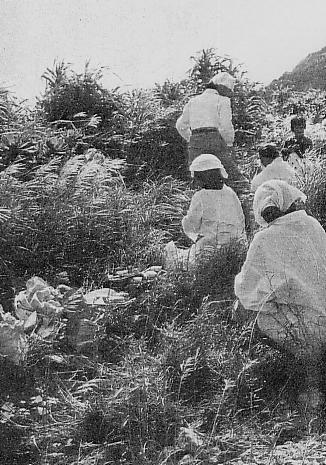
Yuta

Yuta (ユタ) are traditional folk shamans native to Okinawa Prefecture and parts of the Kyushu region in Japan. They make a living by offering spiritual guidance and resolving issues related to both supernatural phenomena and everyday life.

== Overview ==
Among the Japanese archipelago, the regions where shamanic activity remains most prominent today are the Tōhoku region and the Nansei islands, including Kyushu. Shamans who enter trance states through possession by spirits of the dead and deliver oracles in the first person are generally referred to as kuchiyose miko (spirit mediums).

While ancient Shinto rituals in Japan were once centered around such practices, these traditions gradually declined over time and are now rarely observed on Honshu. However, similar shamanic religious figures still exist in other regions: itako in Tōhoku, and in the Nansei, practitioners known as yuta, hozon, and toki (in the Amami and Okinawa islands), kankakarja and sasu (in the Miyako Islands), and munuchi, nigeebii, and kanpitou (in the Yaeyama Islands) continue to serve in spiritual roles as spirit mediums.

In Ryukyuan society, religious practitioners are generally divided into two main categories. The first consists of kaminchu (かみんちゅ), or sacred persons, such as the noro (female priestesses), negan (にーがん), sasu (さす), and tsukasa (つかさ), who preside over public rituals and communal prayers at sacred sites like utaki (holy groves), gusuku (fortified sacred places), or ugwanju (shrines).

The second group includes yuta, who act as shamans and deal with more private, spiritual concerns. Their practices include divination (unchee, or fortune-telling), judgment of auspiciousness or inauspiciousness (hanji), purification and removal of misfortune (haree), and prayer for healing (ugwan)—usually on behalf of individual households or families.

While kaminchu must avoid ritual impurity—such as death, menstruation, or childbirth—due to their sacred role, yuta are instead closely tied to death-related rituals and spirit appeasement. Although differing significantly in nature, function, and status, both kaminchu and yuta represent two pillars of Okinawa's deeply rooted shamanic folk religion.

Yuta are regarded as spiritual specialists with the ability to perceive and interpret the invisible world—abilities that ordinary people do not possess. While some intellectuals and educators in Okinawa view belief in yuta as superstition, such practices continue today in the name of cultural preservation.

Because yuta often act in the private sphere and address sensitive family matters, it has traditionally been women—seen as spiritually receptive and empathetic—who have sought their guidance. Publicly active men have sometimes ridiculed or distanced themselves from the practice, but in private, many families are deeply influenced by the instructions of a yuta. This dynamic has led to a situation where men may outwardly appear uninvolved, but are nonetheless bound by decisions made under the yuta's guidance within the household.

Clients who seek the help of yuta include not only farmers, fishers, and laborers, but also government officials, educators, and business professionals. When both personal and communal efforts are exhausted, people often turn to a yuta's hanji (divinatory judgment) to make critical decisions. This tendency remains strong even in contemporary Okinawa.

The practice of consulting yuta is known as "yuta buying" (yuta kōyā), where clients typically seek opinions from two or three different practitioners. It is not uncommon for clients to pay considerable fees for these services. There is an old Okinawan proverb that says, "Half doctor, half yuta", reflecting the persistent dual reliance on both medicine and spiritual guidance.

Acting as intermediaries between the human and spiritual worlds, yuta must be highly sensitive to divine will. Historically, women—viewed as more intuitive—have been considered best suited to this role, though there are also a small number of male yuta.

== Origins ==
According to the Ryūkyūshi Jiten (琉球史辞典), the etymology of the word yuta may derive from yunta ("chatter") or from the verb yutameku ("to shake"), describing the trembling of the body during divine possession. The exact origins of the yuta as a profession remain uncertain, and several theories have been proposed.

Iha Fuyū, a prominent Okinawan scholar, suggested that among the kaminchu (かみんちゅ) responsible for delivering oracles, some held the title without possessing actual spiritual ability. In such cases, others from among the common people stepped in to deliver oracles instead, eventually forming a separate occupation known as toki or yuta. He also noted a possible linguistic connection between yuta and yunta ("to speak").

Sakurai Tokutarō theorized that when traditional shamans such as the noro and negan—once community-based spiritual leaders—were incorporated into the centralized bureaucratic religious system of the Ryukyu Kingdom, a separate class of magical-religious practitioners emerged to fulfill religious functions that lay outside official public rituals. These "outsider" figures became more embedded in local folk religion and responded directly to the needs of ordinary people. Ultimately, they diverged from the now-bureaucratized noro priestesses.

Sasaki Kōkan explained that on the Okinawan mainland, villages (called shima or makiyo) were centered around a main ancestral house (niidukuru), whose female head was known as a negan—a woman who would enter divine possession and provide guidance to the villagers. From the 8th to 9th centuries, local chieftains known as anji began to consolidate villages and govern wider territories. Their sisters or wives, known as noro, also served as spiritual mediums, guiding their communities. However, as the Ryukyu Kingdom unified and became more centralized, the negan and noro gradually lost their shamanic roles and became formal priestesses. It is believed that their earlier shamanic functions were taken over by the yuta.

== Shamanic practices ==
Tokutarō Sakurai studied cases in which clients visited the homes of shamans (Yutanuyā, or "houses of yuta"), and categorized the functions and activities of yuta as follows:

- At the beginning of a new year, yuta provide an annual fortune reading (hachi unchi) during the New Year period or the following month.
- They offer spiritual diagnosis (hanji) for health problems, injuries, or chronic conditions that do not improve through medical treatment.
- They deliver divinations for concerns related to family, village relationships, or kinship ties, and for those who have ominous premonitions.
- They perform dream interpretation to guide clients.
- They provide consultations for those experiencing continued misfortune in business, farming, or fishing.
- Before starting a new venture, changing jobs, building a ship, or opening a shop, they predict the prospects of success.
- They conduct feng shui readings (funshīmī) before constructing or remodeling a home.
- They perform divination to locate lost objects.
- They assess compatibility for marriage and offer guidance on suitability.
- In cases of irregularities related to ancestor rituals (gwansu-gutu), such as memorial services or ancestral tablet worship, they determine the correct course of action.
- They carry out spirit appeasement rituals during bone-washing (senkotsu) or reburial ceremonies.
- They perform ritual offerings for the dead, such as:
  - Nujifā (spirit extraction),
  - Mabui-wakashi (soul-splitting or division),
  - Wakajūkō (minor annual memorial services in the 1st to 7th years),
  - Uwajūkō (major memorials in the 13th, 25th, and especially 33rd years).
- When a male family line ends, yuta may be consulted to spiritually seek and identify a suitable successor through ancestral communication.
- They practice soul restoration (mabui-gumi) and perform rituals of exorcism against malevolent spirits such as majimun (demons) and ichijama (living spirits).
- They provide protective blessings for safe travel.

In addition to private functions, yuta also engage in community-level activities, including:

- Participating in the final spiritual selection of sacred women, such as noro, negan, or kude, during religious appointments.
- Serving as ritual leaders for village ceremonies once overseen by noro priestesses.
- In documented cases, yuta were consulted when sacred ritual objects were stolen from utaki (sacred groves) and their whereabouts were unknown; village noro and community members turned to a yuta's hanji (divinatory judgment) for guidance.

== Faith and spiritual discipline ==
During the process of initiation and ordination, yuta establish a relationship with a specific guardian deity, which becomes the central object of their personal faith throughout their lives. This deity is considered to be a unique spiritual entity revealed during their spiritual awakening or training process.

Each yuta acts as a ritual specialist (fugi) operating under the name and authority of this spiritual presence. In other words, every yuta is believed to be spiritually responsible for a particular domain of the spiritual world. Some are skilled in tracing ancestral lineage, while others specialize in offering divinations (hanji) related to individuals who have recently died. Their areas of expertise differ based on their spiritual alignment.

Yuta emphasize the existence and power of their deities, which may include Shinto gods, deities associated with the twelve zodiac signs, ancestral spirits, spirits of the dead, or nature spirits. Importantly, yuta do not necessarily distinguish between these categories—ancestral, dead, or elemental spirits—when interpreting their supernatural experiences. This non-exclusive and fluid conception of the divine does not appear to diminish their influence within the community.

Tokutarō Sakurai reported on a yuta household (yutanuyā) located in Naha City, where a household shrine (kantana) was found to enshrine a protective deity called mifushi. In the case of the yuta he studied, who was born in the Year of the Rabbit, the mifushi was identified as Monju Bosatsu (Manjushri). The mifushi is typically assigned based on the person's birth year in the twelve-animal zodiac, with others such as Senju Kannon (Thousand-Armed Kannon) being chosen for those born in different years.
