= Seven Wonders of Echigo =

The Seven Mysteries of Echigo, or in Japanese (越後七不思議(えちごななふしぎ)), is a compilation of seven unusual events passed down through Echigo (present day Niigata Prefecture).

The content of each story varies, and there are actually over 40; however, due to the influence of the priest Shinran's legends, the following seven became the most famous.

The Upsidedown Bamboo Niigata-Shi, Chuuou-Ku, Toyano 3-Chome, Saihou Temple. National Natural Monument.

Natural Monument designated title: 鳥屋野逆ダケの藪（とやのさかさだけのやぶ）Toyano Flipped Bamboo Shrub.

This is a bamboo shoot whose bows grow downward. It is said that it planted its roots when Shinran stuck his bamboo walking stick into the ground upside down. The upside down bamboo is a variation of Henon Bamboo, however the way in which its branches hang is different to all others. It is an extremely rare natural deformity and was made a National Natural Monument on October 12, 1922 (the 11th year of the Taisho era). However, in recent times it isn't looked after very much, and one must reference the sole example specimen which is preserved at the Saihou Temple.

The grounds of the Saihou Temple are viewed as sacred and so people cannot enter. It is also said that there was once a custom to occasionally hand out branches that were cut from the bamboo to families who supported the shrine (Danka), and this is thought to have contributed to the decrease in number of the upside down bamboo.

The Burnt Carp

The Bundle of Eight Plums

The Prayer Beads on the Cherry Blossom

The Triple Chestnut

The Threaded Nutmeg Tree

The Incomplete Reed
