= Cantabrian mythology =

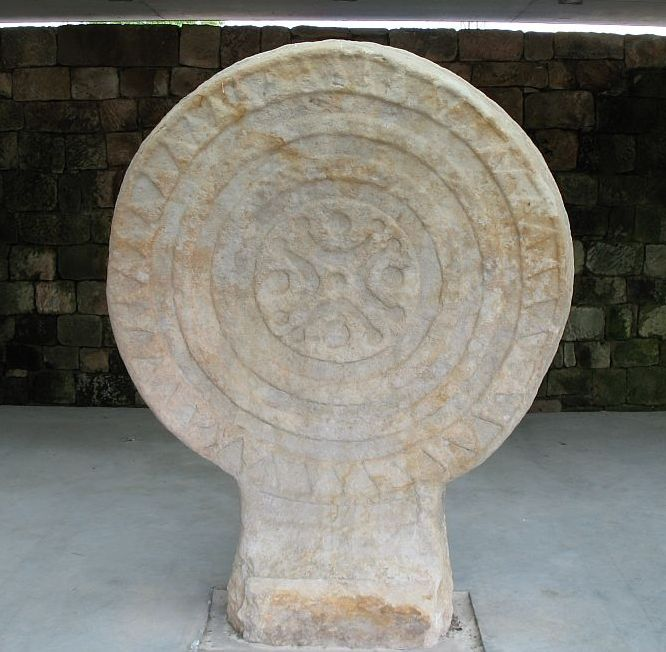
Cantabrian stele of Barros

Cantabrian mythology refers to the myths, teachings and legends of the Cantabri, a pre-Roman Celtic people of the north coastal region of Iberia (Spain). Over time, Cantabrian mythology was likely diluted by Celtic mythology and Roman mythology with some original meanings lost. Later, the ascendancy of Christendom absorbed or ended the pagan rites of Cantabrian, Celtic and Roman mythology leading to a syncretism. Some relics of Cantabrian mythology remain.

== Divinities ==
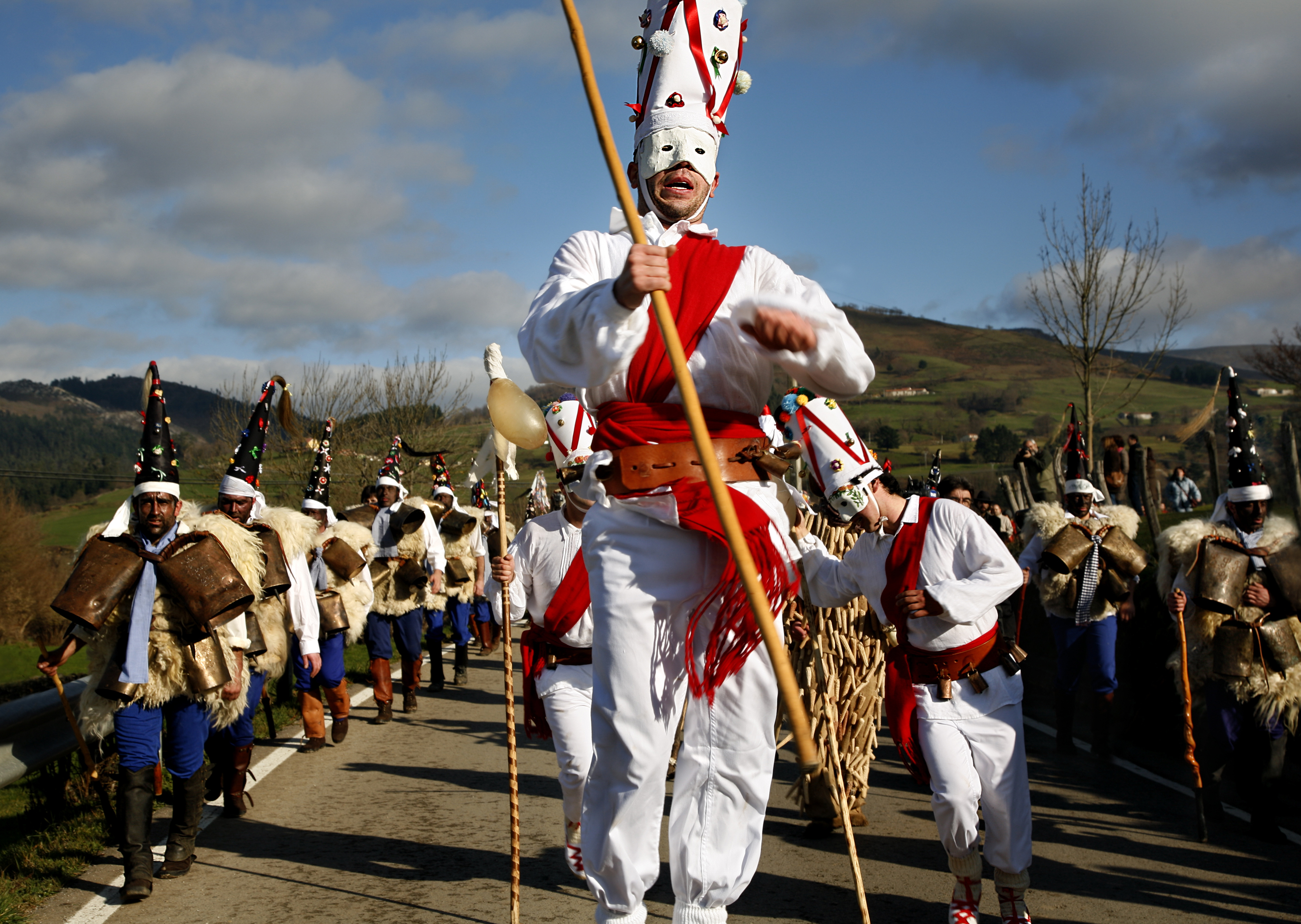
Vijanera masquerade ceremony

Some relics and remnants of Cantabrian worship of protective divinities survive. One example is the Cantabrian stele of Barros which suggests worship of a sun god. Another example may be the Bonfires of Saint John coinciding with the summer solstice. A bronze sculpture found near the town of Herrera in Camargo, Cantabria suggests worship of a male figure. Such a figure would have been absorbed into the Roman worship of Jupiter.

Strabo, Horace and Silius Italicus write of a Cantabrian god of war, later identified with the Roman Mars. The Cantabrian god of war was offered sacrifices of male goats, horses, or large numbers of prisoners. These large sacrifices, or "hecatombs" were accompanied by the drinking of the still warm blood of the horses.

The Cantabrians considered horses to be sacred animals. Tacitus (56–120 AD) mentions that the Germanic people believed this. In Germania X (98 AD), he wrote, se sacerdotes enim ministros deorum, illos equos conscios putant ("the horses themselves think of the priests as ministers of the gods"). Horace (65 BC – 8 BC) writes, et laetum equino sanguine Concanum ("the Cantabrians, drunk on horses' blood").

Julio Caro Baroja suggests there may have been an equestrian deity among Hispanian Celts, similar to that of the other European Celts. The Celtic goddess of the horses, worshipped even in Rome was Epona, which in ancient Cantabria was called Epane. Some link sacrifice of horses with the Celtic variant of the god Mars and that horses represented Mars' reincarnation. At Numantia, where there are ruins of an Iberian Celtic settlement, relics depicting the horse god are decorated with solar signs.

Human sacrifices by the Cantabrians are reported by Saint Martin of Braga. They were similar to those of the Celts of Gaul in purpose. The victim wore a thin tunic. Their right hand was cut off and consecrated to the gods. The fall of the victim and the condition of their entrails were used to predict the future while at the same time, the people sought redemption from the gods.

The Cantabrians, being an agrarian society, worshipped fertility mother goddesses related to the Moon and influencing the phases of sowing and gathering of crops.

A Celtic group worshipping a sea god was assimilated to that of the Roman Neptune. A statuette of this deity showing features of Cantabrian divinity, was found in Castro Urdiales.

The Cantabrians believed in the immortality of the spirit. Cremation was the preferred burial custom. However, fallen soldiers were left lying in the battlefield until vultures savaged the entrails. This meant the soldier's soul was taken to the afterlife and reunited with their ancestors in glory. This practice is recorded in the engravings of the Cantabrian stele of Zurita.

Self-sacrifice, for instance by immolation and especially by a military leader, was considered an important way of fulfilling the will of the gods for the collective good. In the devotio, a leader or general would offer himself in battle as a sacrifice to the gods in order to secure victory for his army.

== Telluric and arboreal mythology ==
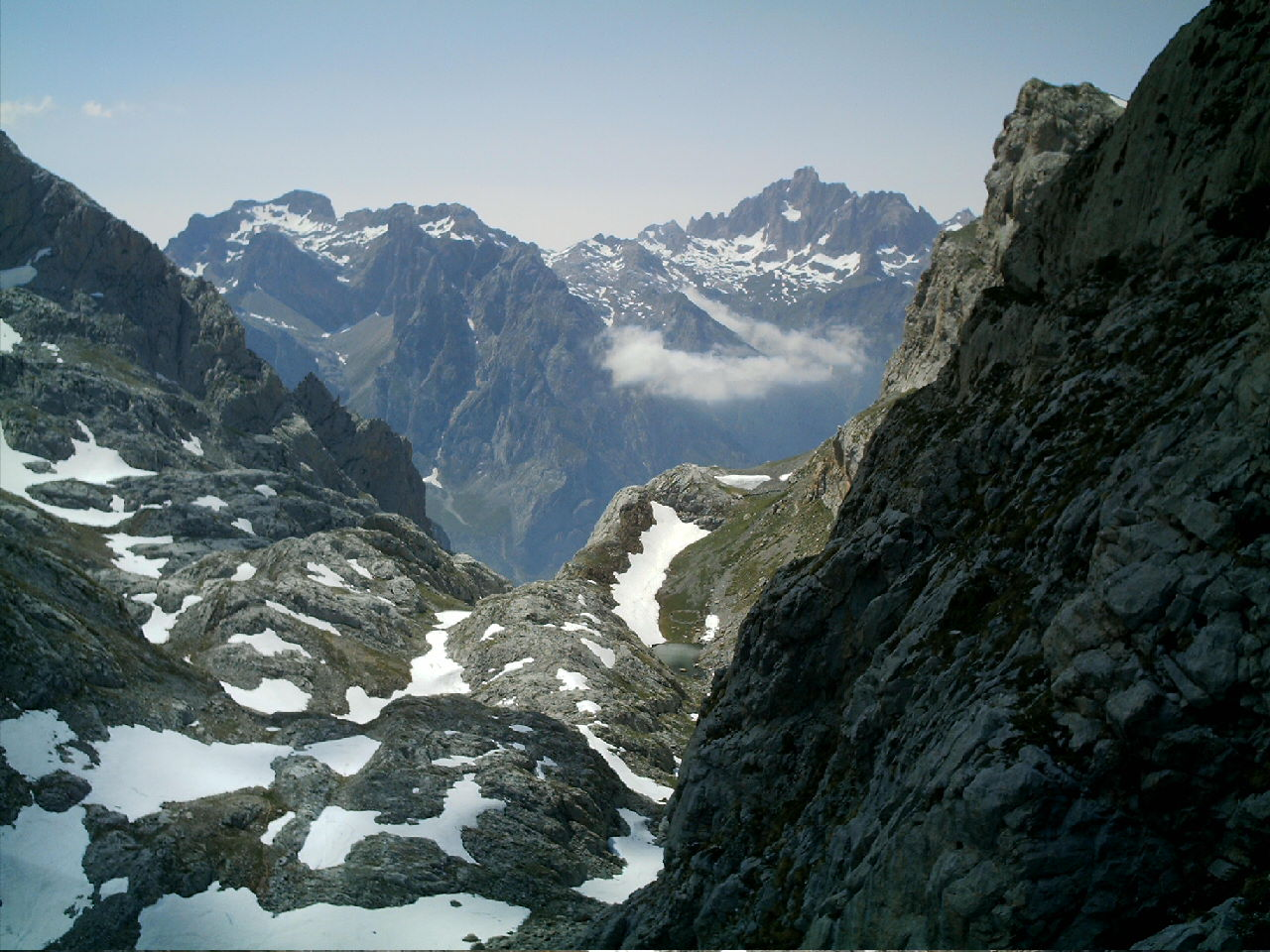
Torre Bermeja (2,400 m) and Peña Santa (Sacred Mount) (2,596 m) in Picos de Europa

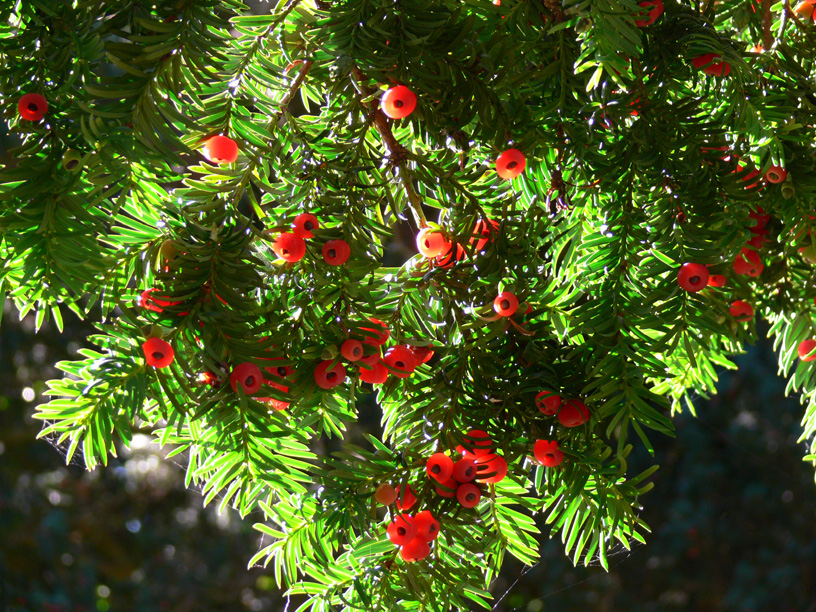
Yew berries. The tree may be the most representative of Cantabria and has often been planted near buildings.

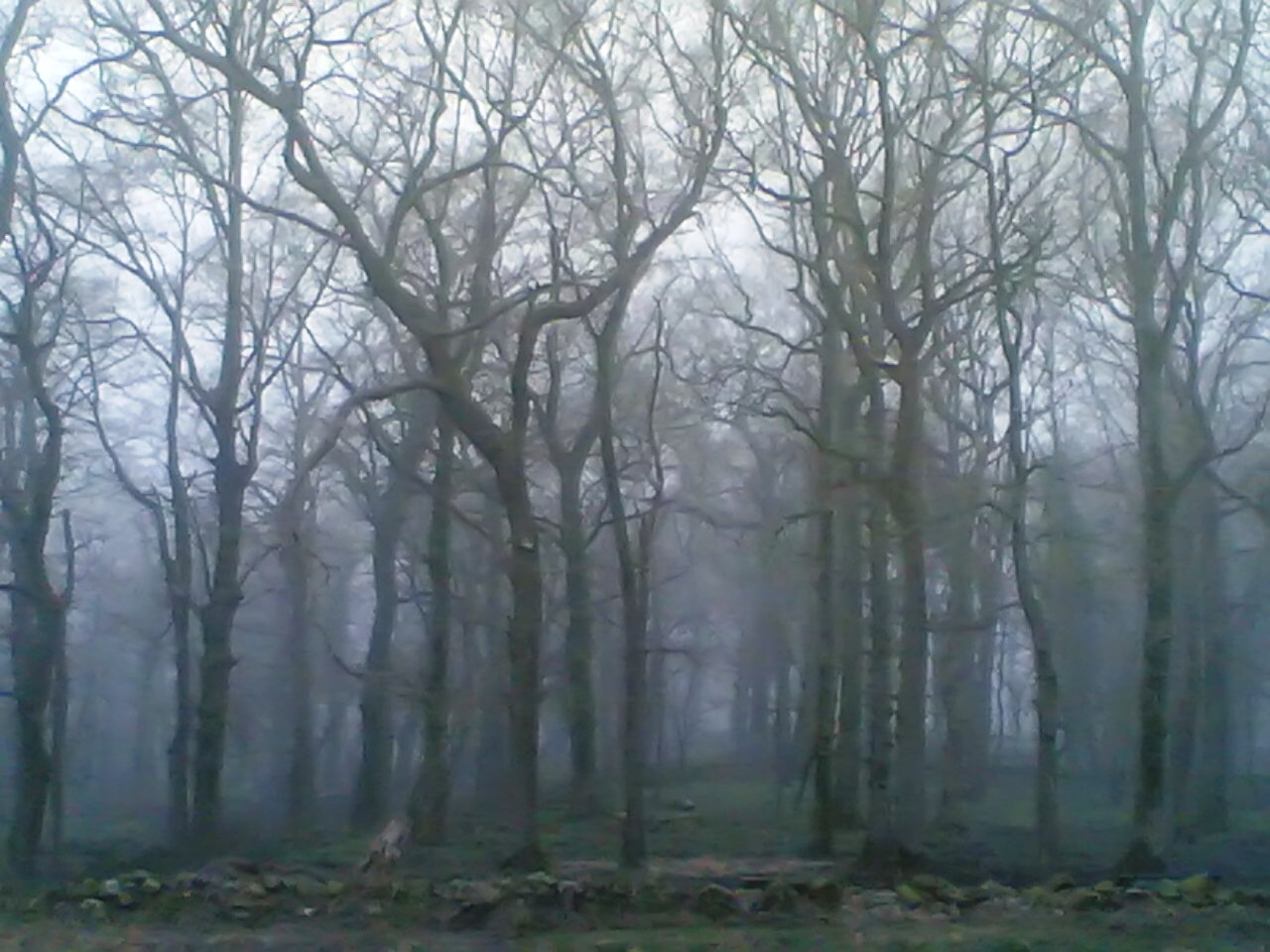
Cantabrian oak forest

Mythology that is connected to the worship of the Mother Earth, is derived from the divinization of animals, trees, mountains and waters as elementary spirits. This was common to the peoples who received Celtic influences.

Some sacred sites such as that at Pico Dobra, in Besaya Valley date to Pre-Roman times. On the other hand, there is an altar dedicated to the god Erudinus, dated to 399 AD, demonstrating that in Cantabria, these rites persisted after the adoption of Christianity as the official religion of the Roman Empire. Certain place names also indicate the presence of ancient sacred places. These include Peña Sagra ("Sacred Mount"), Peña Santa ("Saint Mount"), Mozagro (Montem sacrum or "Sacred Mount") and Montehano (montem fanum or "Mount of the Sanctuary"). The Convent of Saint Sebastian of Hano dates to the 14th century AD but a small chapel pre-existed the monastery on the same site.

Divinization also occurred with respect to rivers and bodies of water. At Mount Cildá there was an area dedicated to the mother goddess, Mater Deva, a personification of the river Deva. At Otañes there was a ritual took place dedicated to the nymph of a spring that had medicinal properties. Pliny the Elder mentions the existence of three intermittent springs in Cantabria. The Tamaric Fountains were worshiped by the Cantabrians as a source of prophetic omens. Pliny recorded the existence of three fountains near one another whose waters joined in one pond. There, the flow would stop for between 12 and 20 days. The cessation of the flow was interpreted by the people as a negative sign. Suetonius, in a story about the life of Galba, records Galba's finding of twelve axes in a lake during his stay in Cantabria. Suetonius mentions this as a sign of good divination. Votive offerings were left there suggesting a tradition of cults related to the lakes. These offerings to the Waters of Stips included bronze coins of low value, as well as other pieces of higher value such as denari, aurei and solidi. Such items were found at La Hermida, Peña Cutral, Alceda and at the Híjar river.

The forests were also divinized by a group with clear Celtic influences. Some species of trees were especially respected such as the yew and the oak. Silius, Florus, Pliny and Isidore of Seville wrote of Cantabrians committing suicide by taking the poison of the yew leaf. Death was preferred over slavery. Yew trees were planted in town squares, cemeteries, churches, chapels, palaces and big houses as they were considered a "witness tree". An ancient yew tree grows beside the church of Saint Mary of Lebeña. The sacred site dates to pre-Roman times. Meetings of the town council took place in the shade of the tree.

The oak is a sacred species for Druids. It features in the Celtic ritual of oak and mistletoe where mistletoe is cut from the boughs of the oak tree. In Cantabria, the oak is a part of folklore, and symbolic and magic beliefs. The oak was used as a Maypole, a pole that presides over festivities, around which people danced to celebrate the rebirth of vegetation in Spring. The oak symbolized the union between the sky and the earth, as the axis of the world. The oak played a role in ceremonies to attract rain and fire as it would attract lightning strikes.

Oaks, beeches, hollyoaks and yews were used by Cantabrians as places of tribal meetings where religious and secular laws were taught. Until recent times, it was usual to convene open meetings under very old trees. For example, the meetings of Trasmiera convened at Hoz de Anero, Ribamontán al Monte, under a hollyoak tree.

== Significant dates ==
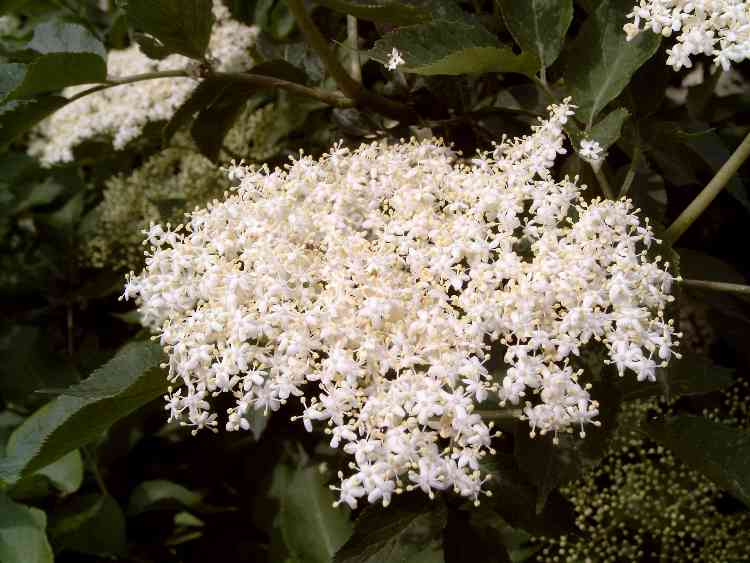
Elder flowers

In Cantabrian mythology there were dates that held significance. For example, during the summer solstice, the "night is magic". Tradition says that Caballucos del Diablu (Damselflies, "Devil's little horses") and witches lose their power after dusk and the curanderos (folk healers) gain control over them. When collected at dawn, a clover with four leaves, the fruit of the elderberry, the leaves of the willow, common juniper and tree heath cure and bring happiness. At Christmas time, (winter solstice) the Cantabrians held ceremonies stemming from the ancient cults to trees, fire and water. The sources of the rivers and the balconies of the houses were dressed with flowers. People danced and jumped over fires.

Specific moments of the day such as twilight were important. Cantabrians spoke of the "Sun of the Dead", referring to that last part of the day when the sun was still visible. They believed that last glimpse of the sun was sent by the dead and that it marked the moment when the dead came back to life. It may have related to a solar cult.

== Mythological creatures ==
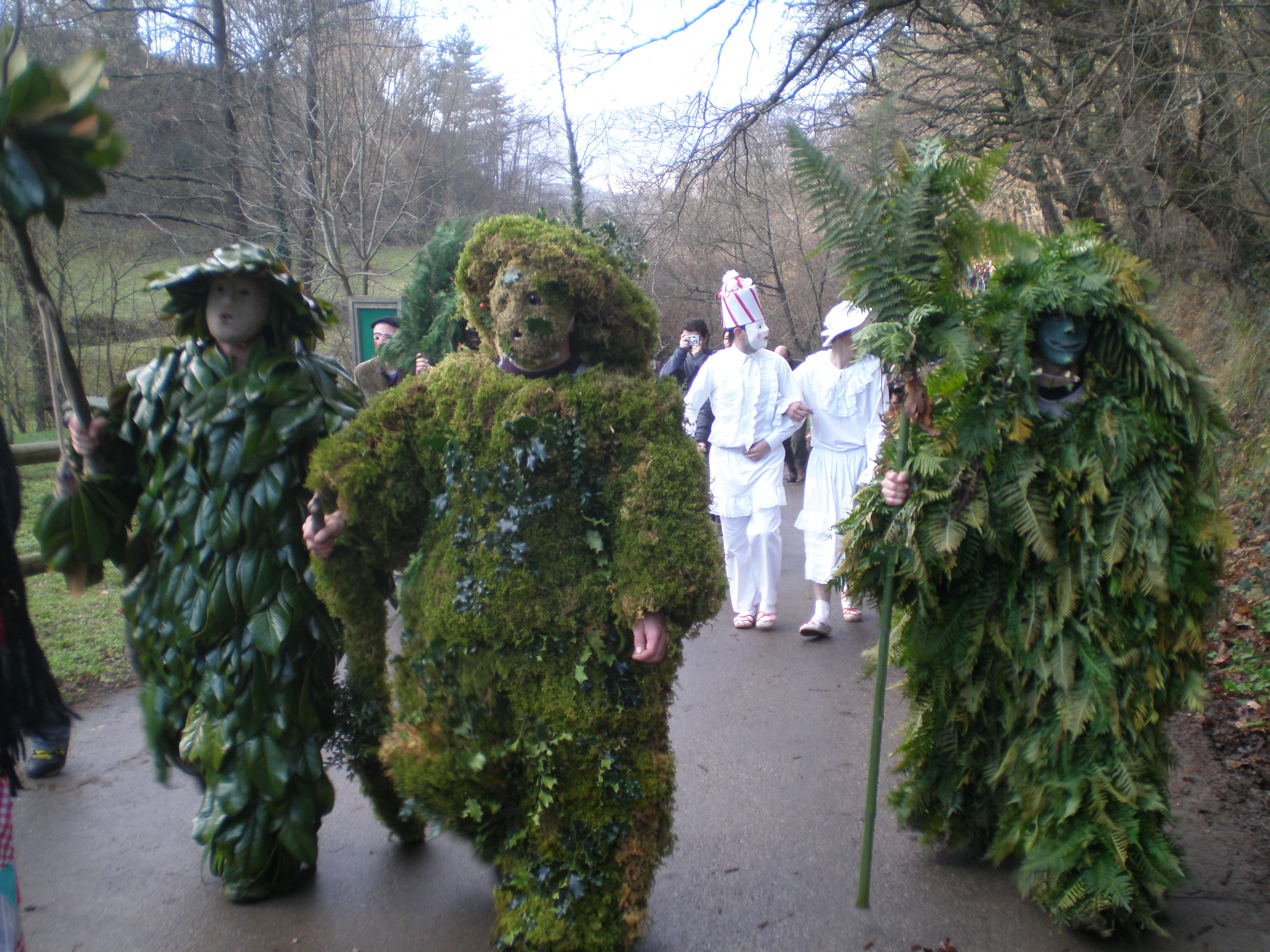
The Trapajones, entities of nature

The Cantabrian people believed in not only telluric and natural divinities, but also other fabulous beings. The people loved or feared them and maintained legends about them. There are many such beings in Cantabrian mythology.

The Ojáncanu ("Sorrow of Cantabria"), a cyclops-like giant, represented evil, cruelty and brutality. It was the Cantabrian version of the Greek Polyphemus. Beings similar to the Ojáncanu are found in other pantheons such as Extremadurian mythology in which it is the Jáncanu, Pelujáncanu or Jáncanas. It is also found in the Basque mythology as Tartalo or Torto. The Ojáncana or Juáncana was the wife of the Ojáncanu. She was more ruthless and killed her children.

The Anjana was the antithesis of the Ojáncanu and the Ojáncana. Anjana was a good and generous fairy who protected the honest, lovers and those who became lost in the woods or on roads.

The goblins were a large group of little mythological creatures, most of them mischievous. There were two groups. One was the domestic goblins who lived in or around houses and included the Trasgu and the Trastolillu. The other was the forest goblins, the Trenti and the Tentiruju.

Other beings in Cantabrian mythology include the Ventolín, the Caballucos del Diablu, the Nuberu, the Musgosu, the Culebre, and the Ramidreju.

The Sirenuca ("Little Mermaid") is a beautiful but disobedient and spoiled young lady whose vice was climbing the most dangerous cliffs of Castro Urdiales to sing with the waves. She was transformed into a water nymph.

Another popular legend is the Fish-man, the story of a man from Liérganes who loved to swim and got lost in the Miera river. He was found in the Bay of Cádiz as a strange aquatic being.

== Bibliography ==
- Mitos y Leyendas de Cantabria. Santander 2001. Llano Merino, M. Ed. Librería Estvdio. ISBN 84-95742-01-2
- Los Cántabros. Santander 1983. González Echegaray, J. Ed. Librería Estvdio. ISBN 84-87934-23-4
- Gran Enciclopedia de Cantabria. Santander 1985 (8 tomos) y 2002 (tomos IX, X y XI). Various. Editorial Cantabria S.A. ISBN 84-86420-00-8
- Mitología y Supersticiones de Cantabria. Santander 1993. Adriano García-Lomas. Ed. Librería Estvdio. ISBN 84-87934-87-0
