= Lists of legendary creatures =

The following is a list of lists of legendary creatures, beings and entities from the folklore record. Entries consist of legendary and unique creatures, not of particularly unique individuals of a commonly known species.

== Alphabetical lists ==
- List of legendary creatures (A)
- List of legendary creatures (B)
- List of legendary creatures (C)
- List of legendary creatures (D)
- List of legendary creatures (E)
- List of legendary creatures (F)
- List of legendary creatures (G)
- List of legendary creatures (H)
- List of legendary creatures (I)
- List of legendary creatures (J)
- List of legendary creatures (K)
- List of legendary creatures (L)
- List of legendary creatures (M)
- List of legendary creatures (N)
- List of legendary creatures (O)
- List of legendary creatures (P)
- List of legendary creatures (Q)
- List of legendary creatures (R)
- List of legendary creatures (S)
- List of legendary creatures (T)
- List of legendary creatures (U)
- List of legendary creatures (V)
- List of legendary creatures (W)
- List of legendary creatures (X)
- List of legendary creatures (Y)
- List of legendary creatures (Z)

== Specific area-related lists ==
=== Legendary creatures ===
- Legendary creatures of the Argentine Northwest region
- List of legendary creatures from China
- List of legendary creatures from France
- List of legendary creatures from Japan
- List of legendary creatures in Hindu mythology

=== Folklore ===
- List of ghosts in Asian folklore
- European folklore
- Folklore of the Dominican Republic
- Folklore of India
- Folklore of Indonesia
- List of Italian folklore
- Folklore of Malaysia
- Folklore of the Maldives
- List of Nordic folklore
- Punjabi folklore
- Romani folklore
- Folklore of Puerto Rico
- Jewish folklore
- Qatari folklore
- List of Romanian folklore
- List of Turkish folklore
- Folklore of the United States
- Folklore of the Low Countries

=== Mythology ===
- Brazilian mythology
- Chilote mythology
- List of African deities and mythological figures
- List of mythical creatures in Egyptian mythology
- List of Greek mythological creatures
- Mythologies of the Indigenous peoples of the Americas
- List of Persian mythology
- List of Philippine mythological creatures
- Mythical creatures in Burmese folklore

== Other ==
- List of creatures in Meitei culture
- List of named animals and plants in Germanic heroic legend
- List of Thai Ghosts
- List of spiritual entities in Islam
- Supernatural beings in Slavic religion

== See also ==
- Bestiary
- Lists of fictional species
- List of urban legends
