= List of legendary creatures (G) =

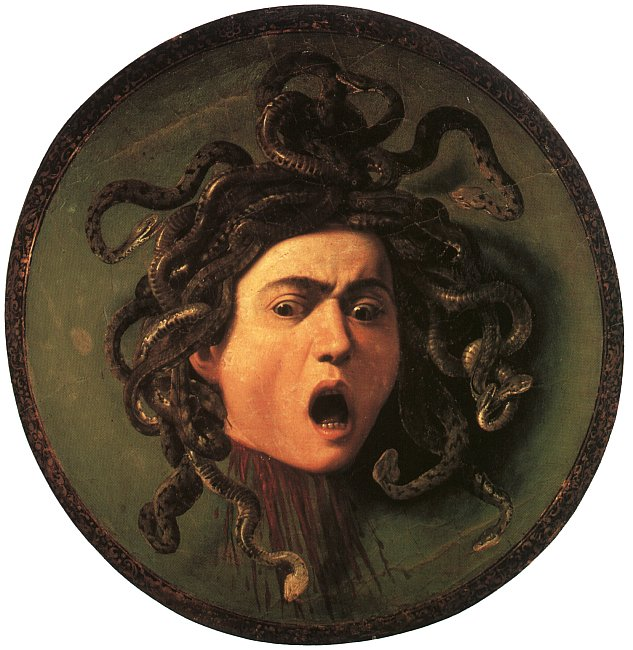
Baroque Medusa (A gorgon) combined beauty and horror: Medusa, after 1590, by Caravaggio.

1. Gaasyendietha (Seneca) – Dragon
2. Gagana (Russian) – Iron-beaked bird with copper talons
3. Gaki (Japanese) – Ghosts of especially greedy people
4. Gaokerena (Zoroastrianism) - Mythic plant
5. Gallu (Mesopotamian) – Underworld demons
6. Galtzagorriak (Basque) – Small demonic servants
7. Gamayun (Russian) – Prophetic human-headed bird
8. Gana (Hindu) – Attendants of Shiva
9. Gancanagh (Irish) – Male fairy that seduces human women
10. Gandabherunda (Hindu) – Double-headed bird
11. Gandharva (Hindu) – Male nature spirits, often depicted as part human, part animal
12. Gargouille (French) – Water dragon
13. Garkain (Australian Aboriginal) – Flying humanoid who envelops his victims
14. Garmr (Norse) – Giant, ravenous hound
15. Garuda (Hindu) – Human-eagle hybrid
16. Gashadokuro (Japanese) – Giant malevolent skeletons
17. Gaueko (Basque) – Wolf capable of walking upright
18. Geb (Egyptian) – God of the Earth, married to Nut
19. Ged (Heraldic) – The fish pike
20. Gegenees (Greek) – Six-armed giant
21. Genius loci (Roman) – Spirit that protects a specific place
22. German (Slavic) – Male spirit associated with bringing rain and hail
23. Geryon (Greek) – Three-headed six-armed giant with three torsos and (in some sources) six legs
24. Ghillie Dhu (Scottish) – Tree guardian
25. Ghost (Worldwide) – Disembodied spirits of those that have died
26. Ghost riders
27. Ghoul (Arabian) – Cannibalistic shapeshifting desert genie often classified as undead.
28. Giant (Worldwide) – Immensely large and strong humanoids
29. Giant animal (Worldwide) – Unusually large beasts
30. Gichi-anami'e-bizhiw (Ojibwa) – Bison-snake-bird-cougar hybrid water spirit
31. Gidim (Sumerian) – Ghost
32. Gigantes (Greek) – Race of giants that fought the Olympian gods, sometimes depicted with snake-legs
33. Gigelorum (Scottish) – Smallest animal
34. Girtablilu (Akkadian) – Human-scorpion hybrid
35. Gjenganger (Scandinavian) – Corporeal ghost
36. Glaistig (Scottish) – Human-goat hybrid
37. Glashtyn (Manx) – Malevolent water horse
38. Gnome (Alchemy) – Diminutive Earth elemental
39. Goblin (Medieval) – Grotesque, mischievous little people
40. Gog (English) – Giant protector of London
41. Gold-digging ant (Medieval Bestiaries) – Dog-sized ant that digs for gold in sandy areas
42. Goldhorn
43. Golem (Jewish) – Animated construct
44. Gorgades (Medieval Bestiary) – Hairy humanoid
45. Gorgon (Greek) – Fanged, snake-haired humanoids that turn anyone who sees them into stone
46. Goryō (Japanese) – Vengeful ghosts, usually of martyrs
47. Grassman (Ohio, USA) – Ape-like cryptid
48. Gremlin (Folklore) – Creatures that sabotage airplanes
49. Griffin (Heraldic) – Lion-eagle hybrid
50. Grigori (Christian, Jewish, and Islamic mythology) – Fallen angels, father of Nephilim
51. Grim (English and Scandinavian) – Tutelary spirits of churches
52. Grim Reaper (Worldwide) – Death angel often thought to be God's/Satan's assistant
53. Grindylow (English) – Malevolent water spirit
54. Grootslang (South Africa) - Large snake often associated with diamonds
55. Ground Shark - Man-eating mystery shark of the Timor Sea
56. Gualichu (Mapuche) – Malevolent spirit
57. Guardian angel (Christian, Jewish, and Islamic belief) – Subclassification of angels that guard and protect a specific person or living being
58. Gud-elim (Akkadian) – Human-bull hybrid
59. Guhin (Japanese) – Anthropomorphic bird
60. Gui Po (Chinese) – Ghost that manifests as an old woman
61. Gui Shu (Chinese) – Ghostly tree that confuses travelers by moving
62. Gulon (Germanic) – Gluttonous dog-cat-fox hybrid
63. Gumiho (Korean) – Demonic fox with thousands of tails believed to possess an army of spirits and magic in its tails
64. Gurangatch (Australian Aboriginal) - An enormous reptile-fish whose movements carved out the landscape south of the Blue Mountains
65. Gurumapa (Nepalese) – Child-eating demon
66. Gwyllgi (Welsh) – Black dog
67. Gwyllion (Welsh) – Malevolent spirit
68. Gyascutus (American folklore) – Four-legged herbivore
69. Gytrash (Lincolnshire and Yorkshire) – Black dog
70. Gyūki (Japanese) – Bull-headed monster
