= List of legendary creatures (O) =

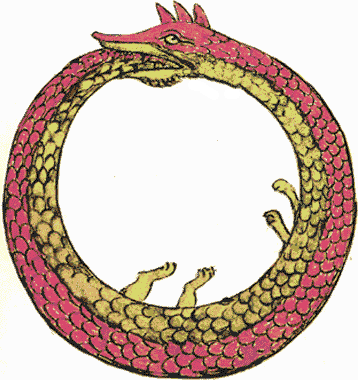
1478 drawing by Theodoros Pelecanos of an Ouroboros, in alchemical tract titled Synosius.

1. Obake (Japanese) – Shapeshifting spirits
2. Obariyon (Japanese) – Spook which rides piggyback on a human victim and becomes unbearably heavy
3. Obayifo (Ashanti) – Vampiric possession spirit
4. Obia (West Africa) – Gigantic animal that serves witches
5. Oceanid (Greek) – Nymph daughters of Oceanus
6. Odei (Basque) – Storm spirit
7. Odin (Norse mythology) – King of Asgard
8. Odmience (Slavic) – Changeling
9. Og (Jewish) – Giant king of the Amorites
10. Ogopogo (Canadian) Canadian Lake Monster
11. Ogun (Nigeria) – Iron god for the Yoruba people (South Western Nigeria)
12. Ogre (Medieval folklore) – Large, grotesque humanoid
13. Oiwa (Japanese) – Ghost of a woman with a distorted face who was murdered by her husband
14. Ojáncanu (Cantabrian) – Giant cyclops who embodies evil.
15. Ōkami (Japanese) – Spirit wolf of powerful
16. Okiku (Japanese) – Spirit of a plate-counting servant girl, associated with the "Okiku-Mushi" worm
17. Öksökö (Yakut/Dolgan) – Two or three-headed eagle
18. Ōkubi (Japanese) – Death spirit
19. Okuri-inu (Japanese) – Dog or wolf that follows travelers at night, similar to the Black dog of English folklore
20. Ole-Higue (Guyanese) – Vampiric hag who takes the form of a fireball at night
21. Ōmukade (Japanese) – Giant, human-eating centipede that lives in the mountains
22. Oni (Japanese) – Large, grotesque humanoid demon, usually having red skin and horns
23. Onibi (Japanese) – Spectral fire
24. Onikuma (Japanese) – Bear monster with enormous strength that walks upright
25. Onmoraki (Japanese) – Bird-demon created from the spirits of freshly dead corpses
26. Onocentaur (Medieval Bestiaries) – Human-donkey hybrid
27. Onoskelis (Greek) – Shapeshifting demon
28. Onryō (Japanese) – Vengeful ghost that manifests in a physical rather than a spectral form
29. Onza (Aztec and Latin American folklore) – Wild cat, possibly a subspecies of cougar
30. Oozlum bird (Unknown origin) – Bird that flies backwards
31. Ophiotaurus (Greek) – Bull-serpent hybrid
32. Opinicus (Heraldic) – Lion-eagle hybrid, similar to a griffin, but with leonine forelimbs
33. Opiyel Guabiron (Taíno) – A dog-shaped god that watched over the dead
34. Orang Bunian (Malay) – Forest spirit
35. Orang Minyak (Malay) – Spectral rapist
36. Orc (Italian Renaissance) - Sea monster, based on ancient Greek Cetus, from Orlando Furioso by Ludovico Ariosto
37. Ördög (Hungarian) – Shapeshifting demon
38. Oread (Greek) – Mountain nymph
39. Ork (Tyrolean) – Little people and house spirits
40. Orobas (European) – Horse-headed, honest oracle classed as a demon
41. Orphan Bird (Medieval Bestiaries) – Peacock-eagle-swan-crane hybrid
42. Orthrus (Greek) – Two-headed dog
43. Osiris (Hellenized) – God of the dead and the judge of the underworld
44. Oshun (Nigeria) – God of love and fertility
45. Otso (Finnish) – Bear spirit
46. Ouroboros (Worldwide) – Mystic serpent/dragon that eats its own tail
47. Ovinnik (Slavic) – Malevolent threshing house spirit
48. Owlman (Cornish) – Owl-like humanoid
