= List of legendary creatures (R) =

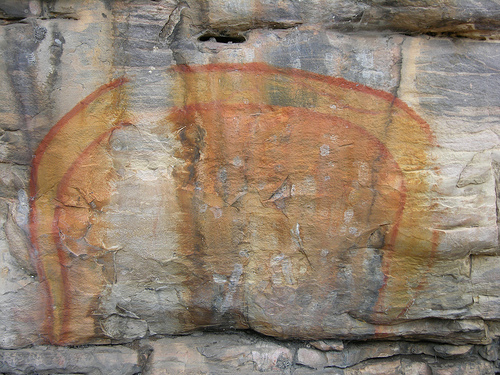
Australian Aboriginal rock painting of the "Rainbow Serpent".

1. Rå (Norse) – Spirit that protects a specific place
2. Rabisu (Akkadian) – Vampiric spirit that ambushes people
3. Radande (Swedish) – Tree spirit
4. Ragana (Lithuanian) – Malevolent witch
5. Raijū (Japanese) – Lightning spirit
6. Rain Bird (Native American) – Rain spirit
7. Rainbow crow (Lenape) – Crow spirit
8. Rainbow Serpent (Australian Aboriginal) – Snake
9. Rakshasa (Buddhist and Hindu) – Shapeshifting demon
10. Ramidreju (Cantabrian) – Extremely long, weasel-like animal
11. Rangda (Balinese) - the demon queen of the Leyaks, witches/sorcerers
12. Raróg (Slavic) – Whirlwind spirit
13. Raven Mocker (Cherokee) – Life-draining spirit
14. Raven Spirit (Native American, Norse, and Siberian) – Trickster spirit
15. Ratatoskr (Norse) – Squirrel spirit
16. Redcap (English) – Evil, ugly humanoid
17. Re’em (Jewish) – Gigantic land animal
18. Reichsadler (Heraldic) – Eagle, sometimes depicted with two heads
19. Rephaite (Jewish) – Giant
20. Reptilian humanoid (Global) – Human-lizard hybrid
21. Revenant (Worldwide) – Reanimated dead
22. Roc (Arabian and Persian) – Gigantic bird
23. Rokobakaniceva (Fijian) - Octopus goddess who defeated Dakuwaqa
24. Rokurokubi (Japanese) – Long-necked, humanoid trickster
25. Rompo (Africa and India) – Skeletal creature with elements of a rabbit, badger, and bear
26. Rồng – (Vietnamese) dragon
27. Rougarou (French America) – Human-wolf shapeshifter
28. Rübezahl
29. Rusalka (Slavic) – Female water spirit
30. Ryū – Japanese dragon
