= List of legendary creatures (J) =

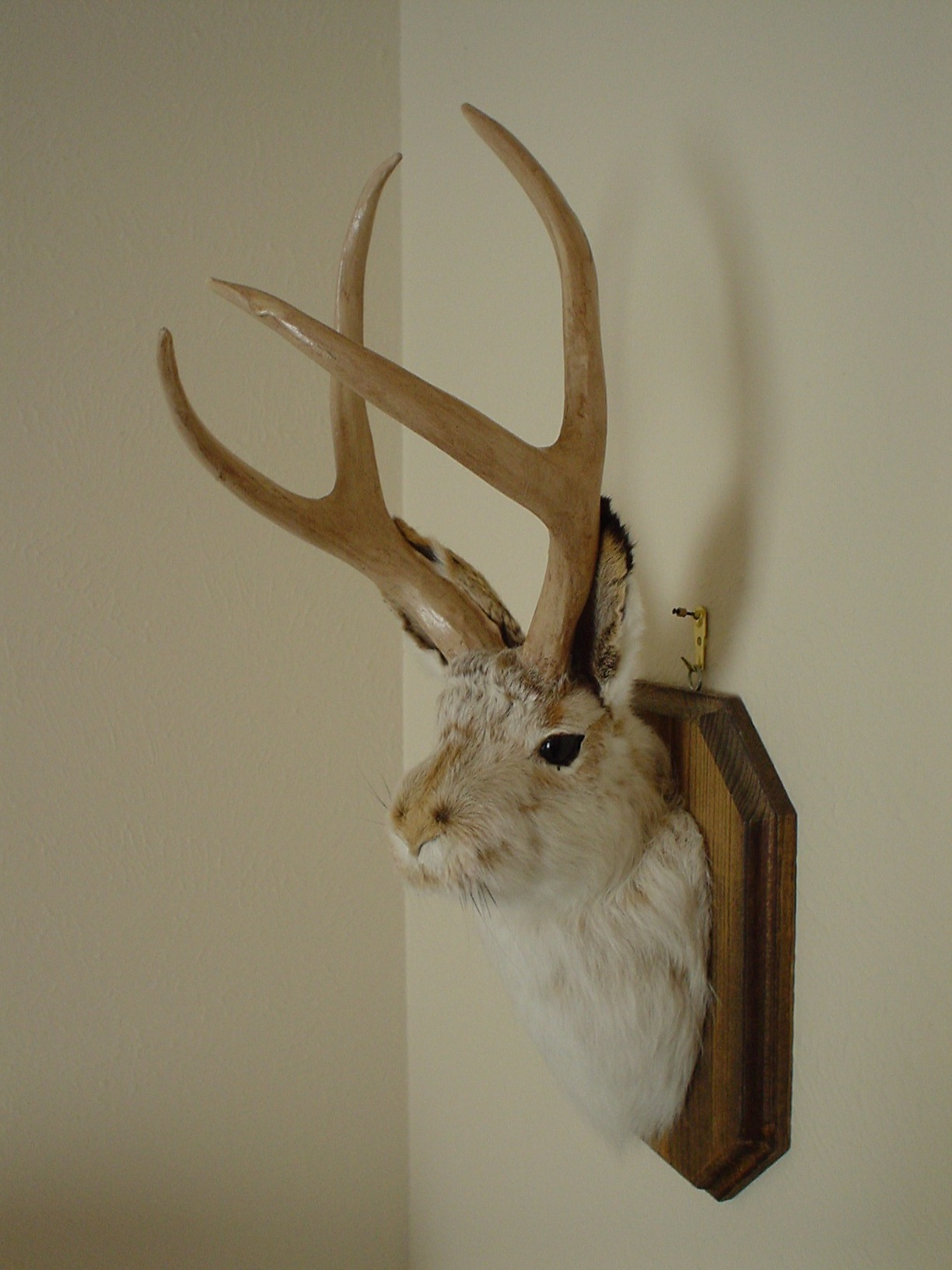
Taxidermy altered to resemble a "jackalope"

1. Jackalope (American) – Rabbit with antlers
2. Jack Frost - Personified of ice, winter and snow
3. Jack-In-Irons (English) – Malevolent giant
4. Jack-o'-lantern (Medieval folklore) – Vegetal lantern
5. Jaculus (Medieval Bestiaries) – Winged serpent or small dragon
6. Jake the Alligator Man (American) – Alligator human hybrid.
7. Jaroszek (Polish) – Field Demon
8. Jasconius (Medieval folklore) – Island-sized fish
9. Jasy Jaterei (Guaraní) – Nature guardian and bogeyman
10. Jatayu (Hindu mythology) – Vulture demigod
11. Jaud (Slavic) – Vampirised premature baby
12. Jenglot (Java) – Vampiric little people
13. Jengu (Sawa) – Water spirit
14. Jentil (Basque) – Megalith-building giant
15. Jenu (Mi'kmaq) – Anthropophagous giant
16. Jerff (Swedish) – Gluttonous dog-cat-fox hybrid
17. Jersey Devil (American) – Demonic dragon or flying demon who was given birth to by an American living in New Jersey
18. Jian (Chinese) – One-eyed, one-winged bird who requires a mate for survival
19. Jiangshi (Chinese) – Life-draining, reanimated corpse
20. Jiaolong (Chinese) – Dragon
21. Jibakurei (Japanese) – Spirit that protects a specific place
22. Jievaras (Lithuanian) – House spirit
23. Jikininki (Japanese) – Corpse-eating ghost
24. Jinn (Arabian, Islamic) – Spiritual creatures; genii
25. Jipijka'm (Mi'kmaq) – Underwater horned snake; lives in lakes and eats humans
26. Jiufeng (Chinese) – Nine-headed bird worshiped by ancient natives in Hubei Province.
27. Jiu tou niao (Chinese) – Nine-headed, demonic bird
28. Jobar (Tuareg) – Giant carnivorous monster.
29. Jogah (Haudenosaunee) – Little people nature spirit
30. Jörmungandr (Norse) – Sea serpent
31. Jorōgumo (Japanese) – Spider woman
32. Jotai (Japanese) – Animated folding screen cloth
33. Jötunn (Norse) – Gigantic nature spirits
34. Jujak (Korean) – Bird
35. Jumbee (Guyanese) – Malevolent spirit
