= Mythical being =

A mythical being may refer to:

- Legendary creature
- Mythology
- List of mythological creatures

== See also ==
- Category:Mythological peoples
