= List of legendary creatures (D) =

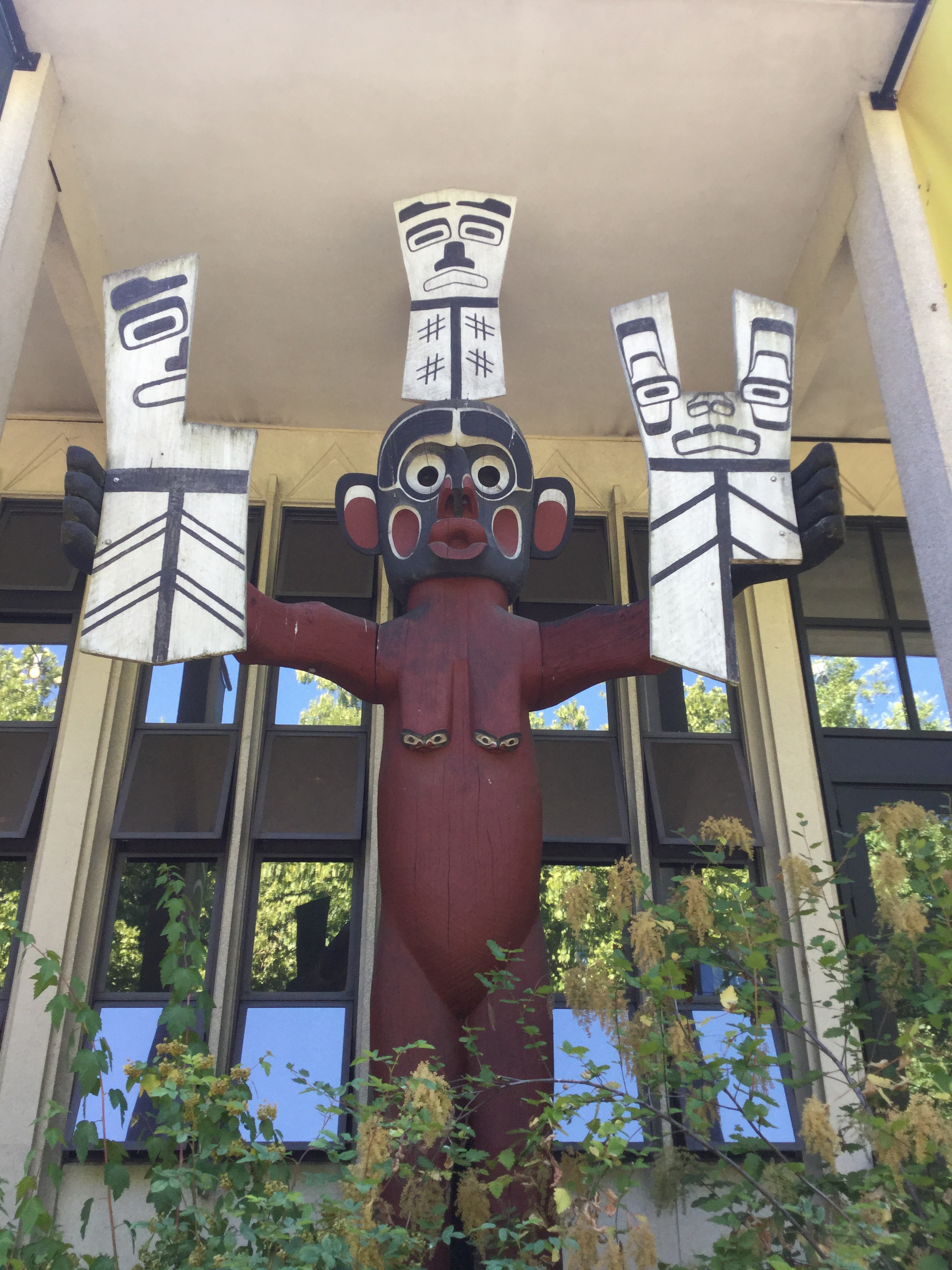
A Dzunukwa

1. Dactyl (Greek) – Little people and smith and healing spirits
2. Daemon (Greek) – Incorporeal spirit
3. Dahu (France, Switzerland and the north of Italy) – Similar to a deer or ibex; legs on one side of its body are shorter than on the other side
4. Daidarabotchi (Japanese) – Giant responsible for creating many geographical features in Japan
5. Daitengu (Japanese) – Most powerful class of tengu, each of whom lives on a separate mountain
6. Daitya (Hindu) – Giant
7. Dakuwaqa (Fiji) - Shark god
8. Dandan (Arabian) – Sea creature
9. Danava (Hindu) – Water demon
10. Dark Watchers
11. Datsue-ba (Japanese) – Old woman who steals clothes from the souls of the dead
12. Dead Sea Apes (Islamic) – Human tribe turned into apes for ignoring Moses' message
13. Ded Moroz (Russia) – A winter spirit who delivers gifts to children on New Year's Eve
14. Deer Woman (Native American) – Human-deer hybrid
15. Degei (Fiji) - Supreme serpent god
16. Deity (Worldwide) – Preternatural or supernatural possibly immortal being
17. Demigod (Worldwide) – Half human, half god
18. Demons (Worldwide especially in Jewish, Christian, and Islamic mythology) - Evil spirits that torment mortals
19. Dhampir (Balkans) – Human/vampire hybrid
20. Diao Si Gui (Chinese) – Hanged ghost
21. Dilong (Chinese) – Earth dragon
22. Dip (Catalan) – Demonic and vampiric dog
23. Di Penates (Roman) – House spirit
24. Dipsa (Medieval Bestiaries) – Extremely venomous snake
25. Dirawong (Australian Aboriginal) – Goanna spirit
26. Diting (China) - Horned White Canine
27. Di sma undar jordi (Gotland) – Little people and nature spirits
28. Djall (Albanian) – Devil
29. Dobhar-chu (Irish) – King otter
30. Do-gakw-ho-wad (Abenaki) – Little people
31. Dokkaebi (Korean) – Grotesque, horned humanoids
32. Dökkálfar (Norse) – Male ancestral spirits; the Dark Elves
33. Dola (Slavic) – Tutelary and fate spirit
34. Domovoi (Slavic) – House spirit
35. Doppelgänger (German) – Ghostly double
36. Drac (Catalan) – Lion or bull-faced dragon
37. Drac (French) – Winged sea serpent
38. Drakon (Greek) – Greek dragons
39. Drakaina (Greek) – Dragons depicted with female characteristics
40. Dragon (Many cultures worldwide) – Fire-breathing and (normally) winged reptiles
41. Dragon turtle (Chinese) – Giant turtle with dragon-like head
42. Drangue (Albanian) – Semi-human winged warriors
43. Draugr (Norse) – Undead
44. Drekavac (Slavic) – Restless ghost of an unbaptised child
45. Dr Jekyll and Mr Hyde
46. Drop Bear (Australian) – Large carnivorous koala that hunts by dropping on its prey from trees
47. Drow (Scottish) – Cavern spirit
48. Drude (German) – Possessing demon
49. Druid
50. Druk (Bhutanese) – Dragon
51. Dryad (Greek) – Tree nymph
52. Duende (Spanish and Portuguese) – Little people and forest spirits
53. Duergar (English) – Malevolent little people
54. Dullahan (Irish) – Headless death spirit
55. Duwende (Philippine) – Little people, some are house spirits, others nature spirits
56. Dvergr (Norse) – Subterranean little people smiths
57. Dvorovoi (Slavic) – Courtyard spirit
58. Dwarf (Germanic) – Little people nature spirits
59. Dybbuk (Jewish) – Spirit (sometimes the soul of a wicked deceased) that possesses the living
60. Dzee-dzee-bon-da (Abenaki) – Hideous monster
61. Dzunukwa (Kwakwaka'wakw) – Child-eating hag
