= List of legendary creatures (Z) =

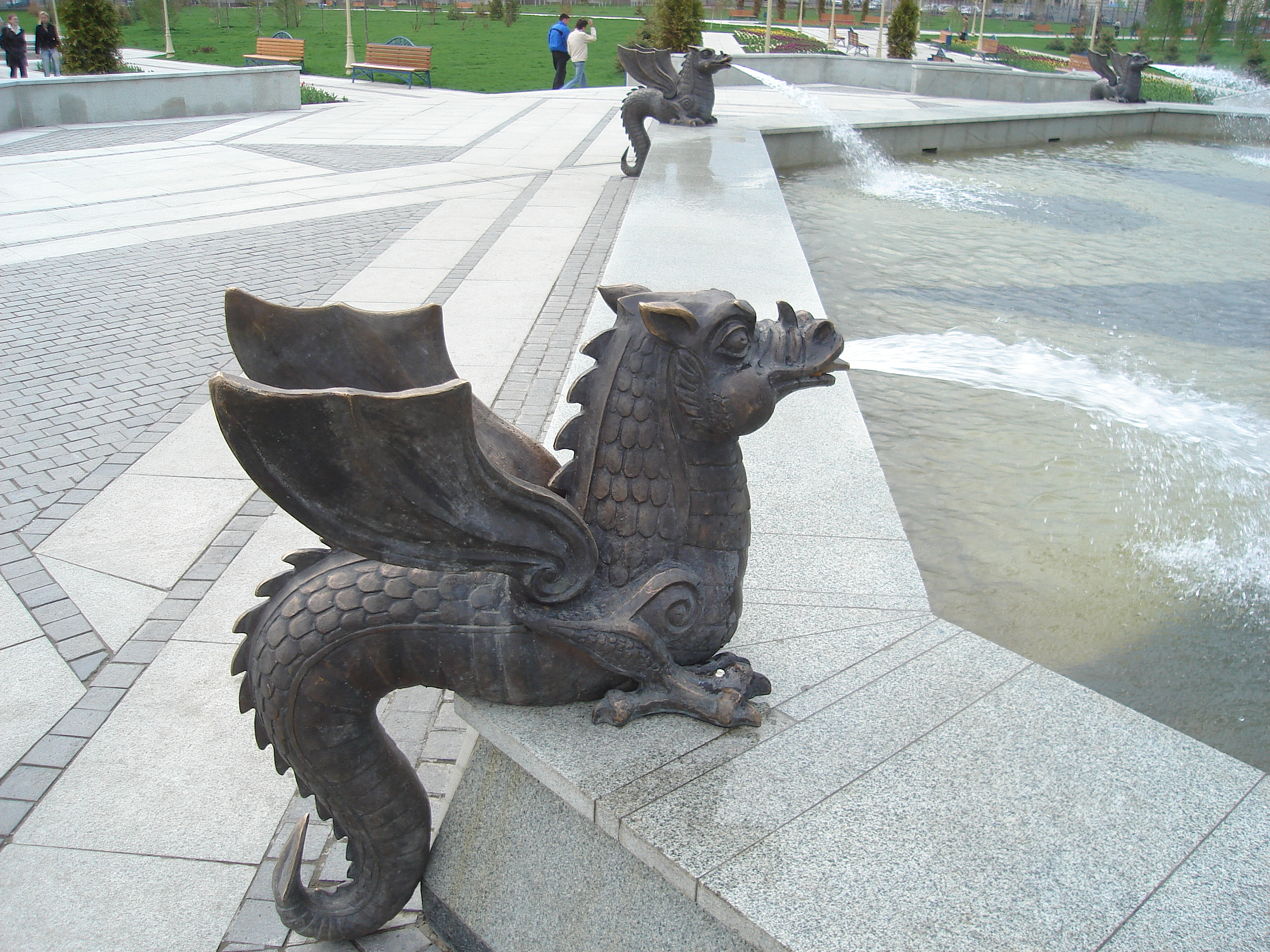
Zilants on a fountain in Kazan

1. Zahhak (Persian) – Dragon
2. Žaltys (Baltic) – Serpentine fertility spirit
3. Zamzummim (Jewish) – Giant
4. Zana e malit (Albanian) – Mountain fairy who bless warriors
5. Zână (Romanian) – Nature spirit
6. Zashiki-warashi (Japanese) – House spirit
7. Zburator (Romanian) – Wolf-headed dragon
8. Zduhać (Slavic mythology) – Disembodied, heroic spirit
9. Zeus (Greek) – God of lightning and storms
10. Zennyo Ryūō (Japanese) – Rain-making dragon
11. Zhar-Ptitsa (Slavic) – Glowing bird
12. Zhulong (Chinese) – Pig-headed dragon
13. Zhū Què (Chinese) – Fire elemental bird
14. Žiburinis (Lithuanian) – Forest spirit in the form of a glowing skeleton
15. Zilant (Tatar) – Flying chicken-legged reptile
16. Zin (West Africa) – Water spirits
17. Ziz (Jewish) – Giant bird
18. Zlatorog (Slovenia) – White golden-horned deer
19. Zmeu (Romanian folklore) – Giant with a habit of kidnapping young girls
20. Zmiy – Slavic dragon
21. Zombie (Vodou/Worldwide) – Re-animated corpse
22. Zouyu (Chinese) - Long and big Cat-like Spirit with a long, red tail
23. Zorigami (Japanese) – Animated clock
24. Zuijin (Japanese) – Tutelary spirit
25. Zunbera-bō (Japanese) – Faceless ghost
