= List of legendary creatures (N) =

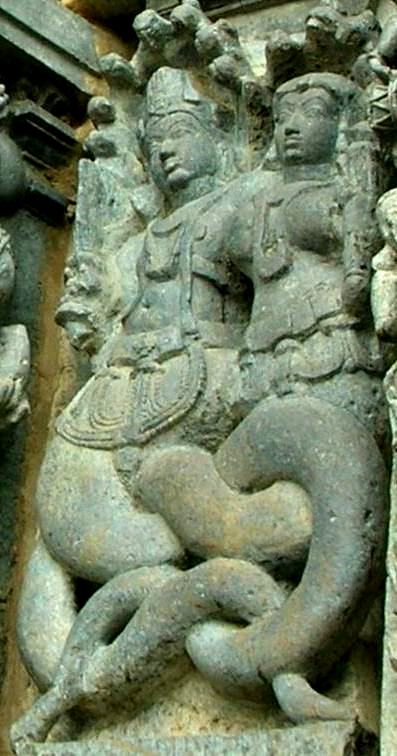
A Hoysala sculpture of a Nāga couple. Halebidu.

1. Nachzehrer (German) – Anthropophagous undead
2. Nāga (Buddhist and Hindu) – Nature and water spirits, serpentine or human-serpent hybrids
3. Naga fireballs (Thai) – Spectral fire
4. Nagual (Mesoamerica) – Human-animal shapeshifter
5. Naiad (Greek) – Freshwater nymph
6. Näkki (Finnish) – Water spirit
7. Namahage (Japanese) – Ritual disciplinary demon from the Oga Peninsula
8. Namazu (Japanese) – Giant catfish whose thrashing causing earthquakes
9. Nando-baba (Japanese) – Old woman who hides under the floor in abandoned storerooms
10. Nandi Bear (East Africa) – Monster Bear-like
11. Nang Takian (Thai) – Tree spirit
12. Nanom-keea-po-da (Abenaki) – Earthquake spirit
13. Napaeae (Greek) – Grotto nymph
14. Narasimha (Hindu mythology) – Avatar of Vishnu in the form of half-man/half-lion
15. Narecnitsi (Slavic) – Fate spirit
16. Nariphon (Thai) – Pod people
17. Nargun (Gunai) – Water monster
18. Nasnas (Arabian) – Half-human, half-demon creature with half a body
19. Nav' (Slavic) – Ghost
20. Nawao (Hawaiian) – Savage humanoid
21. N-dam-keno-wet (Abenaki) – Fish-human hybrid
22. Neck (Germanic mythology) – Female water spirit
23. Negret (Catalan) – Little people that turn into coins
24. Nekomata (Japanese) – Split-tailed magical cat
25. Nekomusume (Japanese) – Cat in the form of a girl
26. Nemean Lion (Greek) – Lion with impenetrable skin
27. Nephilim (Abrahamic mythology) – Gigantic sons of Grigori and human women
28. Neptune (Roman mythology) – God of freshwater and sea
29. Nereid (Greek) – Nymph daughters of Nereus
30. Ngen (Mapuche) – Nature spirit
31. Nguruvilu (Mapuche) – Fox-like water snake
32. Nian (Chinese) – Predatory animal
33. Night hag (Worldwide) – Supernatural creature, commonly associated with the phenomenon of sleep paralysis.
34. Nightmarchers (Hawaiian) – Warrior ghosts
35. Nikusui (Japanese) – Monster which appears as a young woman and sucks all of the flesh off of its victim's body
36. Nimerigar (Shoshone) – Aggressive little people
37. Ningyo (Japanese) – Monkey-fish hybrid
38. Ninki Nanka (Western Africa) – Large reptile, possibly a dragon
39. Nisse (Scandinavian) – House spirit
40. Níðhöggr (Norse) – Dragon
41. Nivatakavachas (Hindu) – Ocean demon
42. Nix (Germanic) – Female water spirit
43. Nobusuma (Japanese) – Supernatural wall, also a monstrous flying squirrel
44. Nocnitsa (Slavic) – Nightmare spirit
45. Nommo (Dogon) - Primordial ancestral spirits usually described as amphibious, hermaphroditic, fish-like creatures
46. Noppera-bō (Japanese) – Faceless ghost
47. Nozuchi (Japanese) – Small sea serpent
48. Nuckelavee (Scottish) – Malevolent human-horse-fish hybrid
49. Nue (Japanese) – Monkey-raccoon dog-tiger-snake hybrid
50. Nü Gui (Chinese) – Vengeful female ghost
51. Nukekubi (Japanese) – Disembodied, flying head that attacks people
52. Nuku-mai-tore (Māori) – Forest spirit
53. Nuli (Medieval Bestiary) – Humanoid with backwards, eight-toed feet
54. Numen (Roman) – Tutelary spirit
55. Nuno (Philippine) – Malevolent little people
56. Nuppeppo (Japanese) – Animated chunk of dead flesh
57. Nurarihyon (Japanese) – Head-sized ball-like creature that floats in the sea and teases sailors
58. Nure-onna (Japanese) – Female monster who appears on the beach
59. Nurikabe (Japanese) – Spirit that manifests as an impassable, invisible wall
60. Nyami Nyami (Tonga (Zimbabwean) mythology) – Snake-spirit of the Zambezi River
61. Nykštukas (Lithuanian) – Cavern spirit
62. Nymph (Greek) – Nature spirit
