= List of legendary creatures (F) =

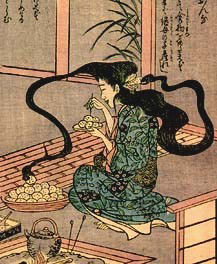
A Futakuchi-onna

1. Fachen (Irish and Scottish) – Monster with half a body
2. Fafnir (Germanic mythology) – Dwarf who was cursed and turned into a dragon. He was later slain by Sigurd in the Saga of Nibelung.
3. Fairy (many cultures worldwide, esp. Germanic mythology/folklore) – Nature spirits
4. Falak (Arabian) – Giant serpent
5. Familiar (English) – Animal servant
6. Far darrig (Irish) – Little people that constantly play pranks
7. Farfadet (French) – Small (some half-meter tall), wrinkled, and brown-skinned helpful sprites.
8. The Fates (Greek) – Three time-controlling sisters
9. Faun (Roman) – Human-goat hybrid nature spirit
10. Fear gorta (Irish) – Hunger ghost
11. Fearsome critters (American)
12. Feathered Serpent (Mesoamerican) – Dragon deity
13. Fei Lian (Chinese) – Chinese wind god
14. Fenghuang (Chinese) – Chinese Phoenix, female in marriage symbol
15. Fenodyree (Manx) – House spirit
16. Fenrir (Norse) – Gigantic, ravenous wolf
17. Fetch (Irish) – Double or doppelgänger
18. Fext (Slavic) – Undead
19. Finfolk (Orkney) – Fish-human hybrid that kidnaps humans for servants
20. Fir Bolg (Irish) – Ancestral race
21. Firebird (Many cultures worldwide) – Regenerative solar bird
22. Firedrake (Germanic) – Dragon
23. Fish-man (Cantabrian) – Amphibious, scaled humanoid
24. Flatwoods Monster (American, West Virginia) – Alien, humanoid
25. Fomorian (Irish) – Goat-headed giant
26. Forest Bull (Medieval Bestiaries) – Giant horned red cattle
27. Four Horsemen of the Apocalypse
28. Freybug (Norfolk) – black dog
29. Fuath (Celtic) – Malevolent water spirit
30. Fucanglong (Chinese) – Underworld dragon
31. Funayūrei (Japanese) – Ghosts of people who drowned at sea
32. Furu-utsubo (Japanese) – Animated jar
33. Futakuchi-onna (Japanese) – Woman with a second mouth on the back of her head
34. Fylgja (Scandinavian) – Animal familiar
