= List of legendary creatures (X) =

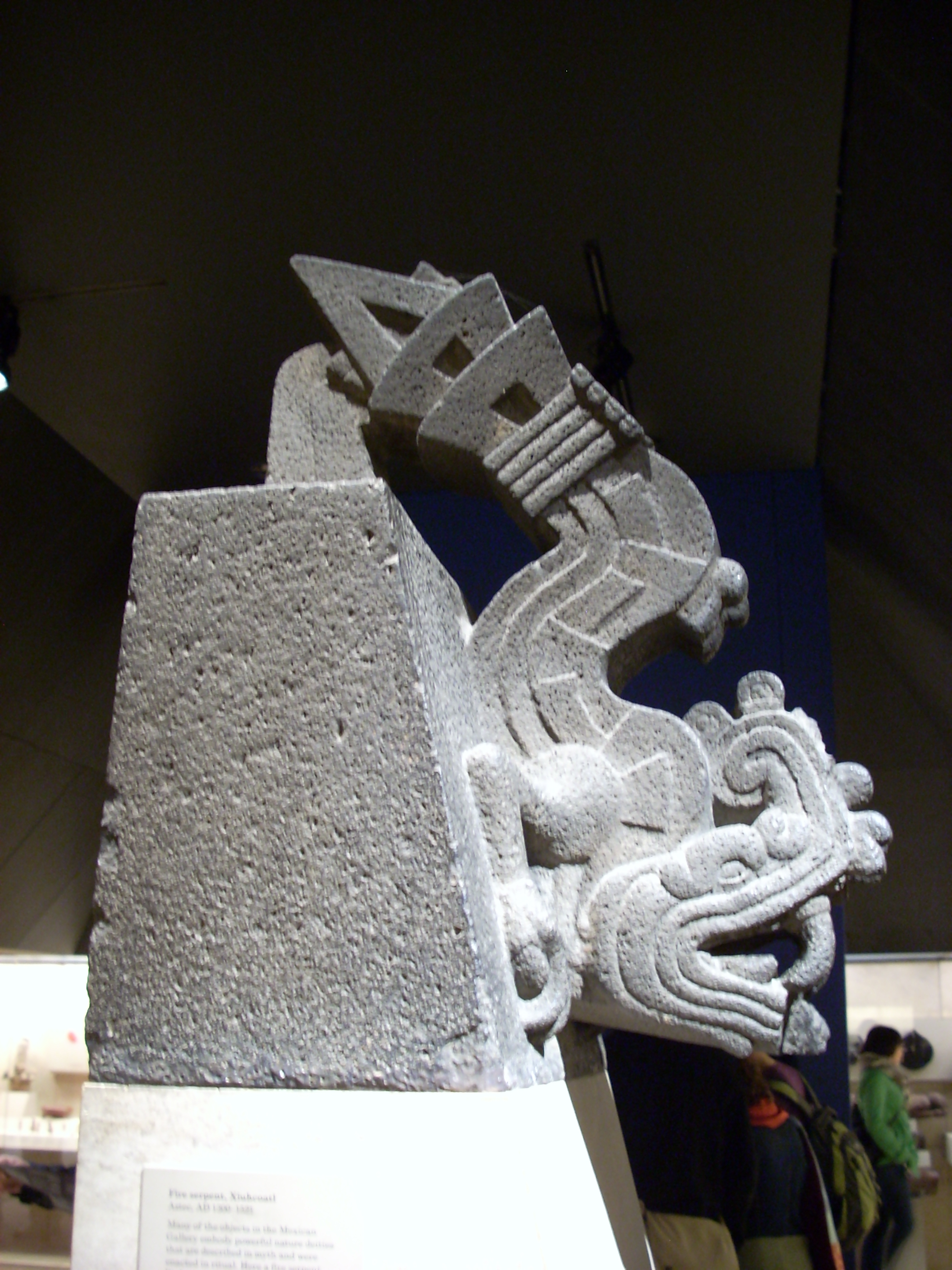
A Xiuhcoatl statue in the British Museum

1. Xana (Asturian) – Female water spirit
2. Xanthus (Greek) — Man-eating horse
3. Xecotcovach (Mayan) – Bird
4. Xelhua (Aztec) – Giant
5. Xiao (mythology) (Chinese) – Ape or four-winged bird
6. Xing Tian (Chinese) – Headless giant
7. Xiuhcoatl (Aztec) – Drought spirit
8. Xhindi (Albanian) – Elves
9. Xochitónal (Aztec) – Giant iguana
