= List of legendary creatures (V) =

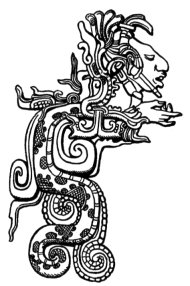
A Vision Serpent, detail of Lintel 15 at the Classic Maya site of Yaxchilan

1. Vadātājs (Latvian) – Spirit that misleads people
2. Vahana (Hindu) – Divine mounts
3. Valkyrie (Norse) – Female spirit that leads souls of dead warriors to Valhalla
4. Vâlvă (Romanian) – Female nature spirit
5. Valravn (Danish) – Supernatural raven
6. Vampire (Slavic) – Reanimated corpse that feeds on blood
7. Vanara (Hindu) – Human-ape hybrid
8. Vântoase (Romanian) – Female weather spirit
9. Varaha (Hindu mythology) – Third Avatar of Vishnu in the form of a boar
10. Vârcolac (Romanian) – Vampire or werewolf
11. Vardøger (Scandinavian) – Ghostly double
12. Vedrfolnir (Norse) – Hawk sitting between the eyes of an eagle in the crown of the World Tree Yggdrasil
13. Veļi (Latvian) – Ghost, shade, formed after a death of a human
14. Vengeful ghost
15. Věri Şělen – Chuvash dragon
16. Vetala (Hindu) – Corpses possessed by vampiric spirits
17. Víbria (Catalan) – Dragon with breasts and an eagle's beak
18. Vielfras (German) – Gluttonous dog-cat-fox hybrid
19. Vila (Slavic) – Weather spirit
20. Vilkacis (Latvian) – Animalistic, werewolf-like monster
21. Vimana
22. Viruñas (Colombian) – Handsome demon
23. Vision Serpent (Mayan) – Mystical dragon
24. Vishap (Armenian) – A dragon closely associated with water, similar to the Leviathan
25. Vitore (Albanian)- Snake spirit that protects the home from evil
26. Víðópnir (Norse) – Rooster that sits atop the tree
27. Vodyanoy (Slavic) – Male water spirit
28. Vrykolakas (Greek) – Undead wolf-human hybrid
29. Vucub-Caquix (Mayan) – Bird demon and false sun god
30. Vættir (Norse) – Nature spirit
