= List of legendary creatures (Q) =

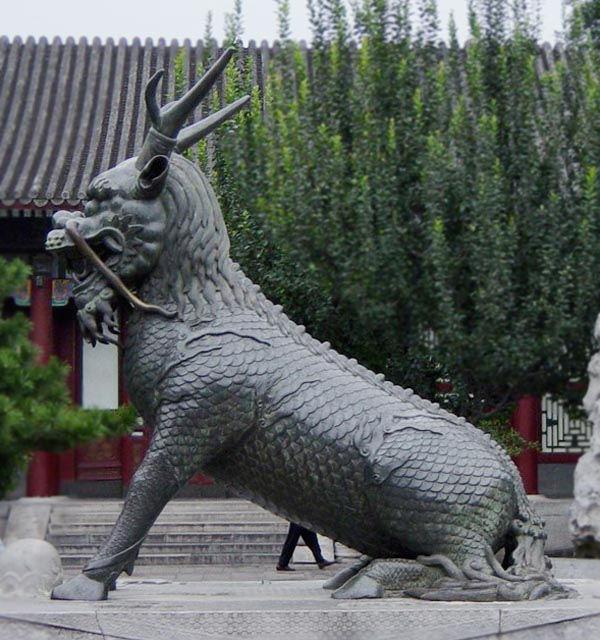
A qilin of the Qing dynasty in Beijing's Summer Palace

1. Qalupalik (Inuit mythology) – Aquatic human abductor
2. Qareen (Islamic) - a spiritual double or jinn-type entity in Islamic belief assigned to every human at birth, staying with them until death
3. Qilin (Chinese) – Dragon-ox-deer hybrid
4. Qiongqi (Chinese) - a legendary, malevolent winged beast in Chinese mythology, known as one of the "Four Perils"
5. Qiqirn (Inuit) – Large, bald dog spirit
6. Qlippoth (Jewish) – Evil spirits
7. Questing Beast (Arthurian legend) – Serpent-leopard-lion-hart hybrid
8. Quetzalcoatl (Aztec) – Important Aztec god whose name means "feathered serpent"; he is not to be confused with the quetzal, a type of bird
9. Quinotaur (Frankish) – Five-horned bull
10. Qutrub (Arabian) - a type of jinn or demon in Arabian folklore often likened to an "Arabian werewolf," a ghoul that haunts graveyards and feeds on corpses
