= Onza =

Mythical cat from Mexican folklore

In Mexican folklore, the onza is a legendary cat species.

== Name ==
The Spanish name onza derives from the Latin lynx, lyncis, and is equivalent to the English word "ounce", originally applied to the lynx but now more commonly to the snow leopard (Panthera uncia). There are old texts written by Spanish conquistadors about the onza, but they might refer to the jaguarundi, which is known as onza in many Mexican states. Onça is the Brazilian Portuguese word for jaguar, Panthera onca, where a spotted jaguar is known as onça-pintada and a melanistic one as onça-preta. These are real animals, occurring as far north as Mexico and possibly into the southwest of the United States. Also, a cat some call the "puma" Puma concolor is known most often as onça-parda in some areas of Brazil (in others, it is known by the name that predates American cougar, suçuarana).

== Legends from history ==
In one legend, after the Spaniards settled in Mexico, the animal was seen more often, and some unidentified group of people gave it the name onza. "It is not as timid as the [cougar]", wrote a Jesuit priest, Father Ignaz Pfefferkorn, in 1757, "and he who ventures to attack it must be well on his guard". Another missionary, Father Johann Baegert, wrote that an "onza dared to invade my neighbor's mission when I was visiting, and attacked a 14-year-old boy in broad daylight ... A few years ago another killed the strongest and most respected soldier" in the area.

=== Twentieth century legends ===
As a more recent series of anecdotes goes, in 1938, and again in 1986, an unknown number of cougar-like animals shot in Sinaloa were identified as "onza" by some unknown parties.

One such story says that in 1938, hunters Dale and Clell Lee, with Indiana banker Joseph Shirk, shot what locals called an "onza" near La Silla Mountain in Sinaloa. Dale Lee was certain that the animal they shot was not a "puma". Although somewhat resembling what some think is a "puma" in coloration, its ears, legs, and body were longer, and it was built more lightly than what they called a puma.

=== The Mysterious Mr. Vega ===
In this legend, the only viable specimen to have been examined was contributed by a rancher named Andres Murillo. In January 1986, he shot what he thought was a jaguar attacking him. Although there's no explanation of who proved it or how, the story goes on to say that it was proved not to be a jaguar. Murillo brought the specimen to a person identified only as "Vega", who was said to own a nearby ranch. There it was found to be a female weighing 60 lb (27 kg) and measuring 45 inches (1.1 m) long without the 23-inch long (58 cm) tail. The story claims the animals were much like cougars but had lighter frames with longer, striped legs, longer ears, and a longer tail. It also claimed this particular cat had the appearance of a cougar with a very long, thin body and long, thin, doglike legs. Deer had been found in its stomach, supposedly indicating that it had eaten recently. The ranch owner referred to as Vega told Murillo that the specimen greatly resembled what he called an "onza" that his father had shot in the 1970s, the skull of which he still had.

In another version of this legend, it wasn't Andres Murillo but two people named Rodriguez and Ricardo Zamora who were deer hunting at about 10:30 p.m. when they came across a large cat which seemed ready to charge. Fearing a jaguar attack, Rodriguez shot it. Seeing that it was not a jaguar or a puma, they took the body back to Rodriguez's ranch and Rodriguez contacted a Mr. Vega, who owned a nearby ranch and was an experienced hunter. This person known as Vega said that the cat was an onza and that it was nearly identical to one that his father had shot in the 1970s (the skull of the Vega animal had allegedly been preserved). Mr. Vega in turn contacted a Ricardo Urquijo, Jr., who suggested taking the animal's body to Mazatlán for examination. There, the cat was found to have a large wound on one of the rear legs which both Rodriguez and Mr. Vega believed to have been inflicted by a jaguar. It was also found to have been in good health with a fully functional reproductive system.

In another version of the Mr. Vega legend, it was actually the farmer Andres Murillo who owned the ranch in the San Ignacio District of Sinaloa and who killed an animal similar to the one shot by Dale and Clell Lee.

DNA testing confirmed that the Sinaloa specimen was a well-known subspecies of cougar and not an American cheetah or an unknown species.

In another legend, it was claimed that researchers from Texas Tech University examined a frozen onza corpse in the 1990s but concluded that it was most likely a genetic variant of the cougar and not a distinct species. The story says that DNA testing had shown the specimen to be another known, but unmentioned, cat species with no significant difference between it and any other cat of that species.

== Identification legends ==
In Mexico the term onza refers to more than one species. In some Mexican states the jaguarundi is also referred to as onza. Furthermore, there are also local legends claiming that there are two species of jaguarundi, one of which is usually called onza.
