= Legendary creatures of the Argentine Northwest region =

The Argentine Northwest region (NOA) is composed of the territory of the Argentinian provinces of Tucumán, Salta, and Catamarca. The region's center is in the area of Santiago del Estero. During the NOA's aboriginal period, the various communities within the area shared a complex culture that was further enriched by constant contacts and exchanges with the Tawantinsuyu or Inca Empire, which was part.

From this early culture numerous myths and legends arose. Two well known Argentine writers, Ricardo Rojas and Julio Carreras, have written works on these myths. Ricardo Rojas major work on this subject is entitled The Country of the Forest (El País de la Selva). Carreras' book on this subject is entitled The Bad Love (El Malamor).

== Sacháyoj ==
Referred to as the "Lord of the Forest" in English, Sacháyoj was a supernatural, aged being with extremely long, white hair that covered his whole body. He is sometimes depicted as carrying a long cane in one of his hands. His function was to serve as the guardian of the forest. When natives felled a tree without need, he would punish them by making the tree disappear forever.

== Orco Mamman ==
Mother of the Hill. Orco Mamman was a beautiful woman who was the guardian of the gold, the silver, and all the metals that lie deep in the mountains. She would often brush her long hair with a golden comb. When metals were excavated in an excessive way, causing damage to the mountains, Orco Mamman would punish the miners. She would push metal-laden caravans, that were returning from the top of the hills, into deep abysses.

== Mayup Mamman ==
Mother of the River. She was a fair-haired woman, who traversed the waters of Mishky Mayu, (Sweet River), in a canoe. She took care of the fish of the river. If fish were being caught excessively, this woman would throw curses on the fishermen, making their canoes sink.

== Almamula or Mulánima ==
If a woman had improper relations with one of the relatives of Almamula, he would punish that woman by transforming her into a series of different forms. First, the woman was transformed in a bogey that would stroll about in the night, seducing, murdering, and devouring any men that she encountered who were alone. Later, Almamula would transform the woman into a mule. The woman, in mule form, would be forced to drag chains during nights on which there were thunderstorms. Finally, Almamula would turn the unfortunate woman into a gigantic black dog with teeth of fire.

== Manchachicoj ==
Manchachicoj was a small, deformed being that was, nevertheless, seductive, elegant, and romantic. Manchachicoj was the son of a demon and a terrestrial witch. He lived in the Salamanca region. He was a tragic figure, who was fated to constantly seek out an impossible love with a nice, young human.
