= Gigelorum =

Insect of Scottish folklore

Gigelorum (or Giol-Daoram) is an insect of Scottish folklore. It was believed to be the smallest creature. No description or information is available about it except that it inhabits the ear of a mite.

Speculation exists that it may be based upon the tiniest insect that can be discerned by people possessing excellent eyesight, the giolcam-daobhram, which is described as "an animalcule, the smallest supposable living thing". Ronald Black, a one time Celtic studies lecturer, author and journalist, suggests that the creature could be a figment of the imagination of folklorist and Tiree minister John Gregorson Campbell as he could trace no authoritative sources for it.
