= Xhindi =

Mythical creature in Albanian mythology

Xhindi is a mythological creature in Albanian mythology.

== Appearance ==
Xhindis are usually depicted as invisible spirits, somewhat analogous to elves in Albanian folklore. Like the devil, Xhindi have entered Albanian demonology from the sphere of demonology of monotheistic religions, specifically from Islamic demonology. The Xhindi of Albanian popular superstition are found everywhere at night, outside in the garden or in the toilet. The places where they like to gather are the mouths of the rivers, where the raindrops are poured from the pool. Their arrival is signaled by the creaking of doors and flickering of lights. Their intentions may be benevolent or malevolent thus they are sometimes represented as kind and helpful while sometimes they appear as oppressive.

== See also ==
- Kulshedra
- Perria
- Stihi
