= List of legendary creatures (W) =

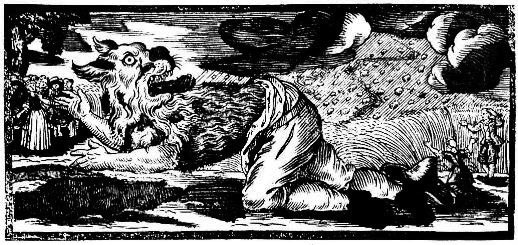
A German woodcut of a Werewolf from 1722

1. Wana-games-ak (Abenaki) – Water spirits
2. Wangliang (Chinese) – Malevolent spirit or monster
3. Wani (Japanese) – Crocodilian water monster
4. Wanyūdō (Japanese) – Demon in the form of a burning human-headed ox cart
5. Warak ngendog (Indonesian Muslim) – Egg-laying bird
6. Warg (English and Scandinavian O.N. vargr) – Giant, demonic wolf
7. Warlock (Worldwide) – Male witch
8. Warraguk (Australian Aboriginal) – Flying humanoid
9. Wassan-mon-ganeehla-ak (Abenaki) – Aurora spirits
10. Water monkey (Chinese) – Water spirit
11. Water sprite (Alchemy) – Water elemental
12. Wati-kutjara (Australia Aboriginal) – Goanna spirits
13. Wa-won-dee-a-megw (Abenaki) – Shapeshifting snail spirit
14. Wechuge (Athabaskan) – Human-eating supernatural creature
15. Weiße Frauen (German) – Female spirit
16. Wekufe (Mapuche) – Demon
17. Wendigo (Algonquian) – Cannibalistic evil spirit
18. Wentshukumishiteu (Inuit) – Water spirit
19. Werecat (Worldwide) – Feline-human shapeshifter
20. Werehyena (African and Near Eastern) – Hyena-human shapeshifter
21. Werejaguar (Olmec) – Jaguar-human shapeshifter
22. Werewolf (Worldwide) – Wolf-human shapeshifter
23. Wewe Gombel (Javanese) – Ghost who kidnaps children
24. White Lady (Worldwide) – Ghost of a murdered or mistreated woman
25. Whowie (Australian Aboriginal) – Giant frog-headed goanna with six legs
26. Wihwin (Miskito) – Malevolent water horse spirit
27. Wild Hunt
28. Wild man (European) – Hairy, bipedal, man-like creature
29. Wild people
30. Will-o'-the-Wisp (Worldwide) – Spectral fire
31. Winged genie (Assyrian) – Bearded male figures sporting birds
32. Winged lion
33. Wirry-cow (Scottish) – Malevolent spirit
34. Witch (Worldwide) – Person who practices magic
35. Witte Wieven (Dutch) – Female, ancestral spirit
36. Wolpertinger (German) – Forest animal comprised from various animal parts (similar to a Chimera)
37. Woman in Black (supernatural)
38. Wondjina (Australia Aboriginal) – Weather spirit
39. World Turtle
40. Wraith (Scottish) – Water spirit or ghostly apparition
41. Wulver (Scottish) – Wolf-headed humanoid spirit
42. Wu Tou Gui (Chinese) – Beheaded ghost
43. Wyrm (European) – Dragon or serpent
44. Wyvern (Germanic Heraldic) – Flying reptile, usually with two legs and two wings
