= Fext =

Mythical undead creature in Slavic mythology

A Fext is a mythical undead creature in Slavic mythology. Its origins are found in the terrors of the Thirty Years' War (17th century) in central Europe. It is said that the Fext is invincible to bullets, except bullets made of glass. Some of the great generals of that time were called Fexts because of their assumed immortality.

== See also ==
- Draugr
- Mummy (undead)
- Undead
- Freischütz
- FEXT, a type of crosstalk.
