= List of legendary creatures (U) =

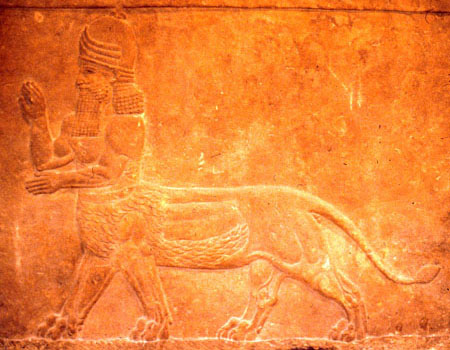
Urmahlullu relief from a bathroom in the palace of Assurbanipal in Ninevah

1. Ubume (Japanese) – Ghosts of women who died in childbirth
2. Uchek Langmeidong (Meitei mythology) – Semi human, semi hornbill creature
3. Ukko (Finnish) – Finnish sky deity
4. Uma-no-ashi (Japanese) – Horse's leg which dangles from a tree and kicks passersby
5. Umibōzu (Japanese) – Ghost of drowned priest
6. Umi-nyōbō (Japanese) – Female sea monster who steals fish
7. Unclean force – Slavic mythological force
8. Undead (Worldwide) – Dead that behave as if alive
9. Underwater panther (Native American) – Feline water spirit
10. Undine (Alchemy) – Water elemental
11. Ungaikyō (Japanese) – Animated mirror
12. Unhcegila (Lakota) – Dragon
13. Unicorn (Medieval Bestiaries) – Horse-like creature with the legs of an antelope, the tail of a lion and a single magical healing horn.
14. Unktehi (Lakota) – Serpentine rain spirit
15. Unktehila (Lakota) – Reptilian water monster
16. Upinis (Lithuanian) – River spirit
17. Upiór
18. Ur (Mandaean) – King of the World of Darkness, often portrayed as a dragon or snake
19. Urayuli (Native American) – Hairy giant
20. Uriaș (Romanian) – Giant
21. Urmahlullu (Mesopotamian) – Lion-human hybrid guardian spirit
22. Ushi-oni (Japanese) – Bull-headed monster
23. Utukku (Akkadian) – ″Underworld messenger spirit″
24. Uwan (Japanese) – Spirit that shouts to surprise people
