= Nawao =

Fictional people in Hawaiian mythology

In Hawaiian mythology, the Nawao are a legendary people, a wild, large-sized hunting people, descended from Lua-nu'u (Beckwith 1970:321-323). Other sources suggest that the Nawao were present in Hawaii before the Menehune who are thought to have driven them out or destroyed them. However, folklorist Katherine Luomala believes that the legends of the Menehune and similar creatures are a post-European contact mythology.
