= Rompo =

Indian and African mythological beast

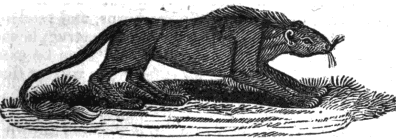

The Rompo is a mythological beast said to have been found in India and Africa. It is described as having the head and mouth of a hare, the ears of a human, a mane, a slender body approximately three feet in length, a long tail ending in a hairy brush, the front feet of a badger, and the rear feet of a bear. It feeds on human corpses, which it obtains by digging up graves, and is termed the "Man-Eater" due to this habit. After discovering a body, instead of immediately devouring it, it circles around it several times as if afraid to seize it. The legend of the Rompo may have been inspired by the ecology and behavior of hyenas.

== Bibliography ==
- Boreman, Thomas. A Description of Three Hundred Animals; viz Beast, Birds, Fishes, Serpents and Insects p. 10. 1730, London. Online.
- Matthews, John and Caitlin. The Element Encyclopedia of Magical Creatures. p. 486. Sterling Publishing. 2006. ISBN 1-4027-3543-X. Online. March 13, 2008.
