= Orphan Bird =

Mythological creature

The Orphan Bird (also known as the Orphanay or Rafanay, and possibly the Gerahav from a similar tale in an Armenian manuscript) is a legendary bird from medieval bestiaries it is said to live in India in a fictional sea called "la mer darenoise". It had a peacock's neck, an eagle's beak, a swan's feet, and a crane's body. It was depicted as having red wings and a black and white coloration. Furthermore, it was said to lay its eggs in the sea. The eggs with the best chicks in them would float, while the bad eggs would sink. When the eggs hatched, the floating eggs would join their parent, while the sunken eggs would hatch under the ocean and live sad and alone under the sea.

The only source for this creature is the bestiary of Pierre de Beauvais.

One possible source for this creature is the behavior of actual birds like Eurasian Coots that will build floating nests on the water.
