= Hud ibn Muhakkam al-Hawwari =

9th-century North African Islamic scholar

Hud ibn Muhakkam al-Hawwari, Arabic: هود بن محكم الهواري (d. second half of the ninth-century), was an Ibadi Quran exegete from North Africa.

== Biography ==
Little is known about his life. It is believed that he was a Berber from the Hawwara tribe and that he lived in the region of the Aurès Mountains in modern day Algeria. His father held the office of Qadi under the rule of Aflaḥ ibn ʿAbd al-Wahhāb (823–871), a ruler of the Rustamid Empire (778–909). His commentary on the Quran was first published in four volumes in 1990, based on five Ibadi manuscripts. The editor of this edition, Belhagg Sa'id Sharifi, an Ibadi from Algeria, wrote in the introduction to the work that al-Hawwari did not write his own original commentary, but based his work on a known tafsir in North African, especially in Kairouan, by Yaḥya ibn Sallam al-Basri (d. 815). Al-Hawwari created an abridged version without citing the original author. In one manuscript, a marginal note states that the work is only attributed to al-Hawwari (muḍaf ila).

The Ibadi historian Ibn Sallam (d. 887) in his Badʾ al-islam wa-shari'aʿ ad-din /بدء الإسلام وشرائع الدين (The Beginning of Islam and the Laws of Religion) dedicated a chapter to fellow Ibadis, including members of the Hawwara tribe, who settled in Kairouan and took part in the city's scholarly life. These contacts may have enabled Ibadis to access the Quran commentary by Yaḥya ibn Sallam al-Baṣri, which was well known in the city.

Al-Hawwari quotes the exegesis of the Quran by Yahya ibn Sallam al-Basri throughout, thus providing access to this work, which is only available in fragments and partial editions.
