= Gulon =

Creature in Scandinavian legend

The Gulon is a creature in Scandinavian legend, also known as a "Jerff" in Northern Sweden and "Vielfraß" in Germany. It resembles a hodgepodge of various animals, usually described as being the size and shape of a dog, with some cat-like features such as the head, ears, and claws. It also supposedly has a thick coat of shaggy brown fur and a tail resembling that of a fox.

== Activities ==
The Gulon is notorious as a symbol of gluttony because of the strange eating habits it is supposed to have. It will make a kill and then gorge itself until it is swollen and unable to eat more, at which point it will find two trees and squeeze itself in between them, pushing the meat through its own body before returning to the kill and repeating the process.

It is most likely a wolverine, based on the traits it shares with the animal native to arctic climates around the world, including Scandinavia.
