= Islamic mythology =

Body of myths associated with Islam

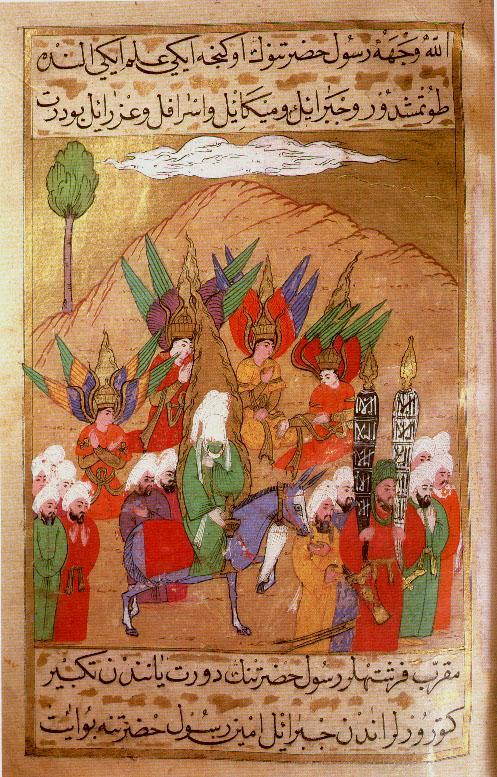
Muhammad and his companions advancing on Mecca, attended by the angels Jibril, Mikael, Israfil and Izrael. An illustration from Siyer-i Nebi.

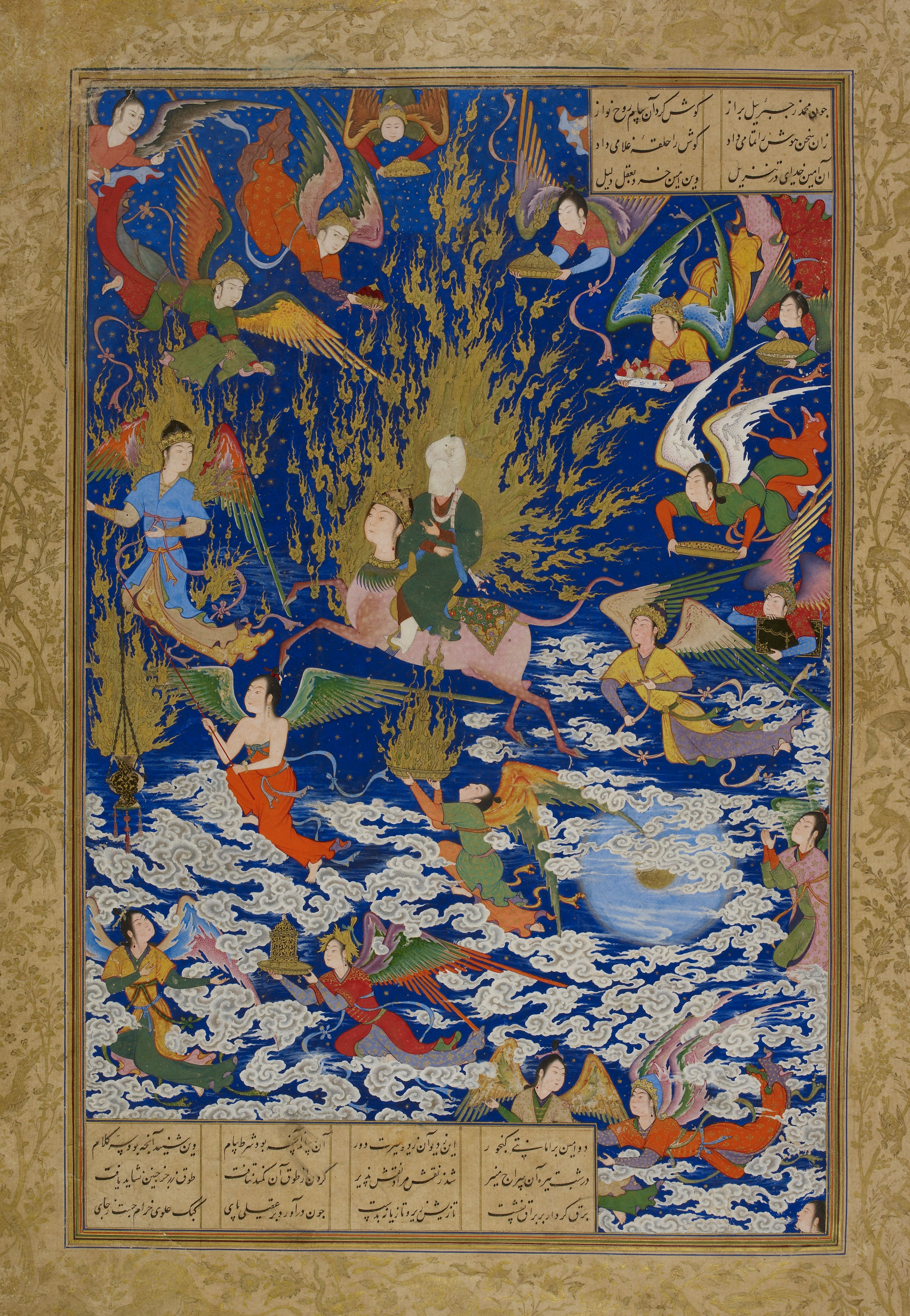
Mi'raj by Sultan Muhammad in Persian literature

Islamic mythology is the body of myths associated with Islam and the Quran. Islam is a religion that is more concerned with social order and law than with religious rituals or myths. The primary focus of Islam is the practical and rational practice and application of the Islamic law. Despite this focus, Islamic myths do still exist. The Oxford Companion to World Mythology identifies a number of traditional narratives as "Islamic myths". These include a creation myth and a vision of afterlife, which Islam shares with the other Abrahamic religions, as well as the distinctively Islamic story of the Kaaba.

The traditional biography of the Islamic prophet Muhammad, who plays a central role in Islamic teachings, is generally recognized as being largely historical in nature, and Islam depends less on mythology than Judaism and Christianity. However, the canonical narrative includes two key supernatural events: the divine revelation of the Quran and the Isra and Mi'raj — the night journey to Jerusalem followed by the ascension to the Seventh Heaven. In addition, Islamic scriptures contain a number of legendary narratives about biblical characters, which diverge from Jewish and Christian traditions in some details.

== Types of Islamic mythology ==
The two types of myth and legends that make up Islamic mythology are cosmogony and eschatology. Cosmogony is a part of cosmogonic and cosmological myths, which are myths that deal in matters of the creation and origins of the universe, and more specially, the world. A cosmology is a culture's specific story of creation, and how in that culture the universe is structured (the placement of the Earth, the stars, and the afterlife). These stores of creation explain in that specific culture the origin of people, the first "home", and the early place of people in the world.

Eschatology is a type of mythology that deals with the day of judgement, the end of the world, heaven, and hell. Translated Eschatology means the "discourse about the last things". Eschatology deals with the question and ultimate quest for what is the "ultimate purpose" of humans in this life.

The discussion of religion in terms of mythology is a controversial topic. The word "myth" is commonly used with connotations of falsehood, reflecting a legacy of the derogatory early Christian usage of the Greek word mythos in the sense of "fable, fiction, lie" to refer to classical mythology. However, the word is also used with other meanings in academic discourse. It may refer to "a story that serves to define the fundamental worldview of a culture" or to stories which a given culture regards as true (as opposed to fables, which it recognizes as fictitious).

== Creation myths ==
Creation myths are based on the Quran, the central scripture of Islam, and expanded upon in hadiths, Arabic and Persian writings, histories (Qiṣaṣ al-anbiyāʾ), Muslim poetry, philosophical essays, and mystical writings. While through syncretism, Islamic creation myths assimilated to African and Asian beliefs, Islam reshaped the indigenous cultural accounts on the origin of the world to fit the central Quranic teaching that, ultimately, everything in existence was created by a monotheistic God (Allah). As consequence, all beings, especially humans, were expected to serve God alone.

The Quran is heavily based by Middle Eastern descriptions of the origin of the world (cosmogony) and creation of mankind (anthropogony). However, the Quran never portrays any of these in a continuous story, but rather alludes to them in order to illustrate a message. It is only in the 7th century, Muslims began to reconcile Quranic passages with Biblical material. Since the Quran refers to Biblical accounts only partly, Biblical stories were either unknown at the times of the revelation of the Quran or did not matter to the early Muslim community to convey the Quranic message.

=== The creation of the world ===
While in Islam there is no single story of creation, it is made clear that God is the one who created the world. Four different verses in the Quran mentions that the heavens and earth (As-Samāwāt Wa Al-Ard) were created by God in six days, with three verse mentioning creation and numbers of days—how many days it took to create only the earth (two days); provide mountains, nutrients, etc. (four days); God's giving of orders to heaven and earth; and creating the seven heavens (two days). The arithmetic of adding the numbers of days can be confusing, as critics (Ali Dashti) point out that two plus four plus two "increases creation from six to eight days", but Quranic translator Abdullah Yusuf Ali argues that commentators understand the four days in verse Q.41:9 to include the two days in verse Q.41:10.

In Sūrah al-Anbiyāʼ, verse 21:30, the heavens and the earth were joined ("of one piece") as one "unit of creation", after which they were "cloven asunder". God then created the landscape of the earth, placed the sky above it as a roof, and created the day and night cycles by appointing an orbit for both the sun and moon. The Quran states that the process of creation took sitta ayam (ستة أيام) or six periods. Critics note that modern cosmology does not fit well with creation of the universe in six (or eight) days and that it would be difficult to determine days before the sun and earth had been created, but many preachers argue the word youm (plural ayam) can be translated as "era" or "period", and sometimes is in translations of the Quran.

=== The creation of humanity ===
==== Adam and the angels ====
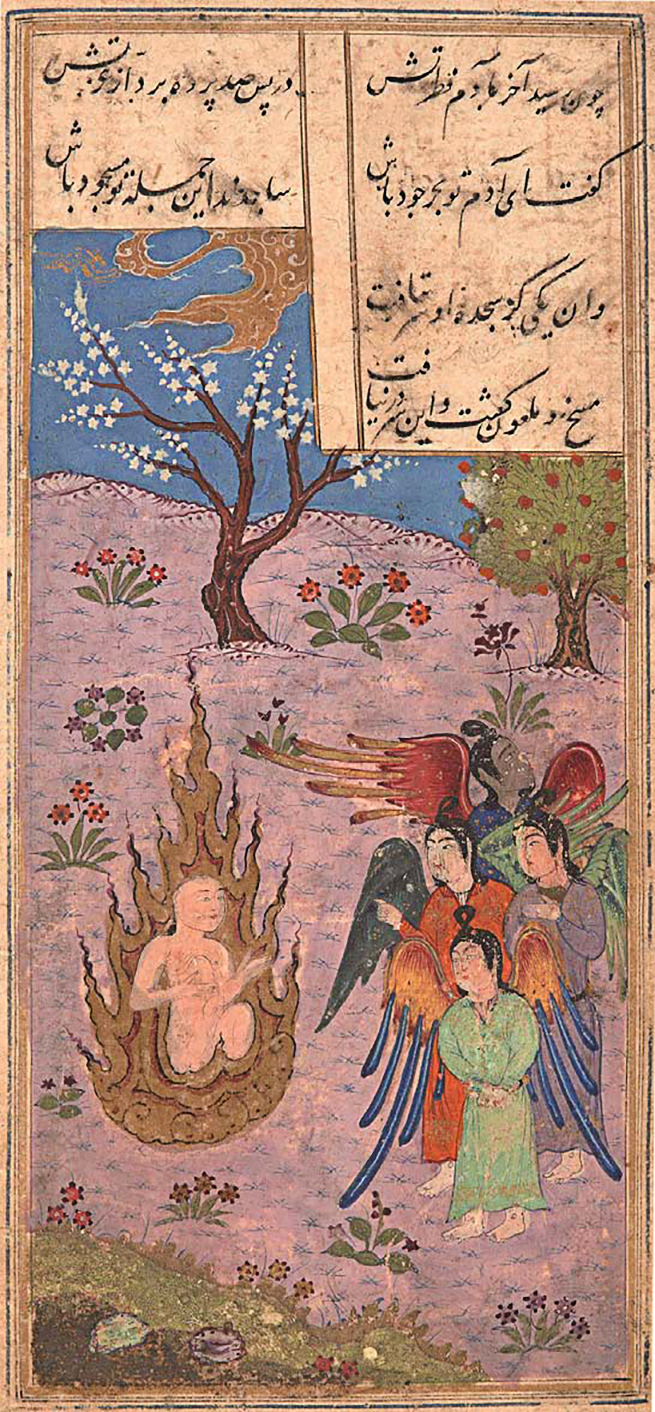
The Angels meet Adam, the prototypical human being. They share, albeit to a lesser degree, the defiant reaction of Iblis, who haughtily turns his head away. Painting from a manuscript of the Manṭiq al-ṭayr (The Conference of the Birds) of Farīd al-Dīn ʿAṭṭār. Iran, Shiraz, 899/1494.

The creation of mankind is discussed along with the creation of angels and jinn. When God created the angels as inhabitants of the heavens and jinn and humans as inhabitants of the earth. The first who lived on earth were the jinn. However, they fought each other until God sent an army of angels headed by Iblis, against them. Adam, representative for mankind as a whole, was created as their successor.

In the Bible, God announces to create mankind in the plural: "let us make man" (Hebrew: "na’aseh adam"), but it is not clear to whom the speech is addressed. While Jewish midrashim conjectured this might be the angels, the Quran is explicit about it: "When your Lord said to the angels:

"‘Lo, I am going to place a vice-regent in the earth.‘ They said: ‘Wilt Thou place in it one who will work corruption and shed blood? We sing hymns in Thy praise and ascribe holiness to Thee.‘ He replied: ‘I know what ye know not.‘ "

Various theologicans and story writers, including Muqatil ibn Sulayman, Al-Tabari, and Ibn Kathir, narrate the creation account of mankind in the context of these verses. Muqatil ibn Sulayman explains, in his exegesis of the Quran, that after the angels defeated the jinn, they settled on earth. It is these angels whom God addressed when he announces to create Adam (mankind) as a deputy of the earth. Tabari also relates a tradition according to which only the angels who were sent to earth are addressed. Maqdisi and Al-Kisa'i, on the other hand, considers all angels to be addressed. The command to bow before Adam is seen as a test by God for the angels.

The angels, either only from the angels of the earth or from all angels, oppose the creation of Adam for a variety of reasons. One major reason is due to the sins Adam's successor will commit, which is explicitly mentioned in the Quran. Another reason is, according to Hasan al-Basri and Abu Qatada al-Ansari, that angels consider themselves superior to Adam in terms of knowledge. Overall, the angelic opposition derives from a faulty analogy between Adam and the jinn. The angels do not know that from among mankind, there will be saints and prophets, despite the sinners among them. Eventually, the angels bow down, but Iblis. Angels who remained in opposition become devils.

The reluctance of bowing down before Adam is also occasionally linked to Harut and Marut. Others assert that they fell much later and independent of Iblis. This pair of angels is said to have made critical remarks about mankind and their sinful behavior, while claiming moral superiority. Whereupon God challenged them to descend to earth and avoid committing three major sins. However, secuded by a woman, they succumb to all these sins and are not allowed to ascend back to heaven. Like devils, they tempt people into sin by teaching forbidden magic. While the angels have no sex-characteristics at all, devils procreate bisexually.

==== Adam in the Garden ====
Adam is according to Islam, both the first human and the first prophet. The Quran says that he and his wife dwelled in Garden of Eden. Adam and his wife both eat from the forbidden Tree of Eternity. According to the Quran, as punishment God declares the earth as a dwelling place for humans. Only due to free will, humans are able to produce good. Thus, although Adam's disobedience created evil, only this made it possible to create good. The disobediences of Adam and his wife were already forgiven by God during their life.

Islamic traditions are more extensive, adding further details into the Quranic creation narrative. According to a common narrative, God ordered the Archangels to collect a handful of soil from earth. But every time an archangel approached earth, the earth sought refuge in God, that it might not be distorted. All the archangels returned empty-handed, except Azrael, who succeeded because he sought refuge in God before, for that he will not return unsuccessful. Another common traditions, portrayed the body of Adam lying on the ground for forty years, whereupon Iblis became curious of the new creation. After investigating the lifeless body, he promised that, if he will gain authority over it, he will destroy it. In another tradition, it is not Azrael, but Iblis, included among the archangels, who succeeded in collecting soil from the earth, thus he later declined to prostrate himself before whose formation he just assisted.

There is an extensive debate among the exegetes (muffasirun) on the creation of Eve as outlined in the foundational sources - Qur'an and Hadith. Surah an-Nisa verse one says "O people! Be mindful of your Lord who created you from a single soul (nafsin wahida) and created from it, its mate (zawjaha)..." Most Muslim exegetes have interpreted this verse as suggesting that Eve (zawjaha) is the secondary creation brought forth from Adam (nafsin wahida). Karen Bauer argues that since the nature and manner of Eve's creation in the Qur'an remains obscure, exegetes had no option but to read into the text of the Qur'an using Biblical, para-Biblical accounts and older myths. The first spouse, according to the Qur'anic narrative, was created from (min) and for man (lahu) (Q. 7:189), but the meaning of from (min) is not clear. The exegetes have understood this in two key ways: first, from the "crooked rib" and second, "of the same type (substance)" It is worth mentioning that the Bible presents both accounts - of the same type (Genesis 1:26-7) and from the rib (Genesis 2:20-4) (109). The creation of man in the Quran differed from the Bible in that man was not made like the image of God but in the best of creation and not from Earth's dust but specifically from a dried pottery-like dark red clay, and that humans were made from a mixed fluid droplet that was recreated into a clinging thing, and that God made from water every living thing and that Eve was made from the person of Adam not his rib.

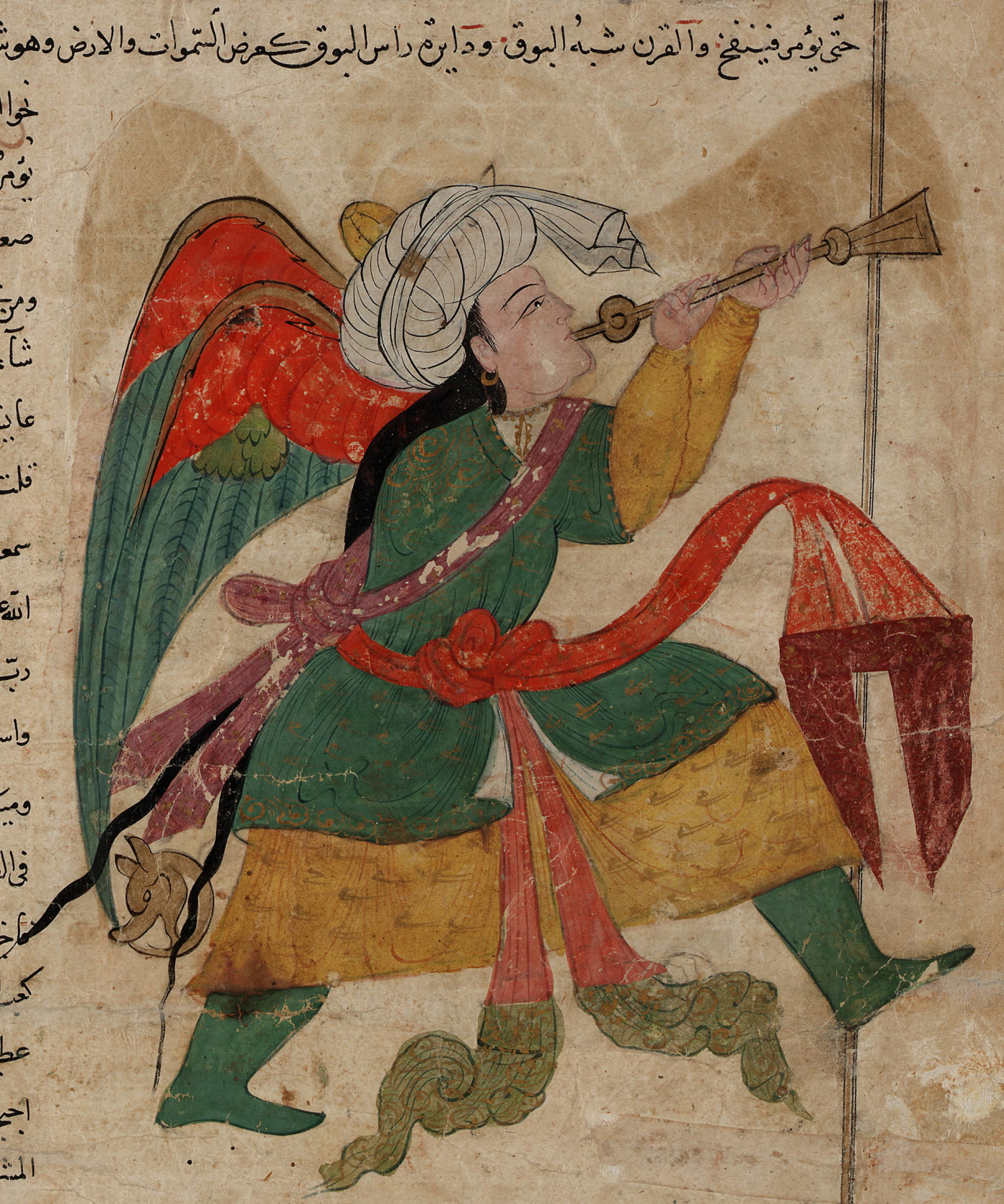
Islamic drawing of an angel blowing a nafir trumpet, probably Israfel.

Muqatil b. Sulayman (d. 150/767), one of the earliest interpreters of the Qur'an says Eve was created from Adam's rib and this is reflected in her name - Eve (Hawwa), from the word living being (hayy).

Another early exegete, Hud b. Muhakkam al-Hawwari (d. 3rd/9th century) presents the same reading by referring it to al-Hasan al-Basri who reported from Muhammad that "indeed, woman was created from a rib, and if you wish to straighten her you break her." Many traditionalist exegetes like al-Tabari, Ibn Abi Hatim al-Razi, Maybudi, etc. have quoted these opinions. But others like Abu Ja'far Muhammad al-Baqir and Ibn Bahr argue that Eve was created "of the same type." In the modern period, the creation of Eve continues to be intensely debated. Pakistani scholar of the Qur'an, Israr Ahmed (d. 2010) was of the opinion that with the advances in our knowledge due to modern science, the notion of Eve's creation from Adam's rib is against human observation and reason. He believes the "crooked rib" hadith is using a metaphor to make a point regarding the psychological nature of women. Israr, in the evolution of the animal kingdom from a unicellular being like an amoeba, sees a clear indication that the creation was brought forth from the first unicellular being in which the characteristic of biological sex did not exist.

Islamic traditions often use figures similar to the Biblical narrative. Adam's wife is commonly named Hawa, and the serpent reappears together with a peacock as two animals, which supported Iblis to slip into Adam's abode. Many denied, that the Garden in which Adam dwelled with his wife, was identical with the Paradise in afterlife. They rather lived in paradisical conditions before their fall, while after their fall, they need to work to survive. Unlike Christian mythology, in Islamic thought, they did not simply walk out of paradise, but fell out of it. Hawa was punished with childbirth and menstruation, while Adam became bald and the serpent lost its legs.

Regarding the creation of Muhammad, Islam developed the belief in the pre-existence of Muhammad. (Note: The idea of Pre-Islamic Muhammad in deeply rooted in Islamic tradition and already attested in the Sunni-canonical collection (al-Tirmidhi). The association of Muhammads pre-existence with light can also be found in Ibn Ishaq's Sira. Later, both Sunni and Shia sources extended this motif to construct cosmological scenarios.) This posits that God created the spiritual nature of Muhammad before God created the universe or Adam. Following this belief, Muhammad was the first prophet created, but the last one sent to mankind. When Adam walked in heaven, he once read the Shahada inscripted in the Throne of God, a belief attested by Al-Bayhaqi, who attributes it to Umar. In a Shia version, the inscription also mentions Ali.

== Structure of the world ==
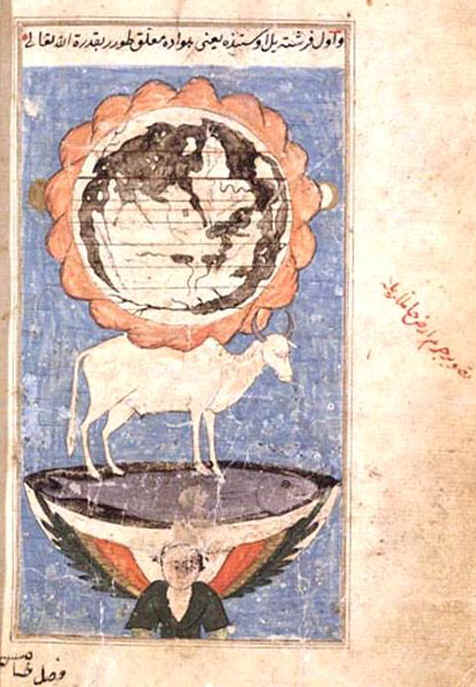
Map of the world according to Zakariya al-Qazwini. The world is carried by a fish (Leviathan), a bull (Behemoth) and an angel.

The traditionalist account on the structure of the world is deeply embedded in the larger context of Middle Eastern mythological cosmology. In contrast to the philosophical and some views deriving from speculative theology (Kalām), which agrees with Hellenistic cosmology on the distinction between a lower material world and an unchanging celestial world, the traditionalists describe both the earthly world and the heavens as composed of material nature.

Accordingly, the heavens span in a dome-like structure over the earths, arranged in horizontal layers one upon another. At top stands the Throne of God (Al-ʽArsh) separated from the seven heavens below. The lowest heaven is often associated with a firmly-enclosed water of a celestial ocean. Below the heavens follow the seven earths. The earths are likewise also part of the supernatural cosmos and serve as gradual stages of hell. The surface is inhabited by humans, the lower stages are the abode of destructive winds and djinn, followed by brimstones of hell, scorpions and vipers, and eventually the devils at the bottom.

== The Kaaba ==
According to Islamic mythology, God instructed Adam to construct a building (called the Kaaba) to be the earthly counterpart of the House of Heaven and that Ibrahim (Abraham) and Ismail (Ishmael) later rebuilt it on its original foundations after was destroyed in the flood of Nuh (Noah). According to other opinions, Ibrahim and Ismail were the first to build it. As Ismail was searching for a stone to mark a corner with, he met with the angel Jibrail (Gabriel). Jibrail gave him the Black Stone. According to the hadith, the Black Stone is reported to have been milky white after being descended from Heaven but was rendered black due to the sins of the people, who had touched it. Muslims do not worship the Black Stone.

The Kaaba was originally intended as a symbolic house for the one monotheistic God. However, according to Islamic mythology, after Ibrahim's death, people started to fill the Kaaba with "pagan idols". When Muhammad conquered Mecca after his exile, he removed the idols from the Kaaba. The inside of the Kaaba is now empty. It now stands as an important pilgrimage site, which all Muslims are supposed to visit at least once if they are able (Hajj). Muslims are supposed to pray five times a day while facing in the Kaaba's direction (qibla).

== Events ==
- Creation - a six-stages creative act by God
- Fall of man - expulsion from Heaven
- Deluge and Noah's (Nuh's) Ark- flood-event. Unlike Christianity, the flood might be either global or local
- The Exodus - Story of Moses leaving Egypt, whereupon God reveals Tawrat to him on biblical Mount Sinai
- Qiyamah - the Day of Resurrection; a fundamental element of Islamic eschatology that incorporates much from the Jewish and Christian traditions

== In Salafi thought ==
Beginning as a reaction to the Age of Enlightenment in Europe and the threat of Western colonialism, Salafi reformism sought out a more practical model to "restore the ummah", downplaying mystical, cosmic, and mythological aspects attributed to Muhammad, while simultaneously emphasizing the social and political role of the sunnah.

Many adherents of the Muslim Brotherhood reject most traditional Islamic mythological narratives. Sayyid Qutb attempted to break the connection between Khidr and the Quran, eliminating his identification with God's servant mentioned in Surah 18. Accordingly, adherents of Qutbist thought began to no longer perceive Khidr (and his corresponding mythology) as related to Islam. The teachings of Sulaiman Ashqar disapprove of many records about the traditional material regarding angels, including the Classical scholars who used them, which has led to a marginalization of Islamic thought of angels, including names and stories regarding their origin.

== See also ==
- Christian mythology
- Folk religion
- Jewish mythology
- Religion and mythology

== Sources ==
- The Holy Quran. Electronic Text Center, University of Virginia Library. Available online.
- Dashti, `Ali (1994). Twenty Three Years: A Study of the Prophetic Career of Mohammad (PDF). Archived from the original (PDF) on April 25, 2015.
- Mircea Eliade. Myth and Reality. Trans. Willard R. Trask. NY: Harper & Row (Harper Torchbooks), 1968.
- Ibn Warraq (1995). Why I Am Not a Muslim (PDF). Prometheus Books.
- Robert A. Segal. Myth: A Very Short Introduction. NY: Oxford UP, 2004.
- Huston Smith. The Religions of Man. NY: Harper & Row (Perennial Library), 1965.
- Zong In-Sob. Folk Tales From Korea, Third Edition. Elizabeth: Hollym International, 1982.
