= Jewish mythology =

Body of myths associated with Judaism

Jewish mythology is the body of myths associated with Judaism. Elements of Jewish mythology have had a profound influence on Christian mythology and on Islamic mythology, as well as on Abrahamic culture in general. Christian mythology directly inherited many of the narratives from the Jewish people, sharing in common the narratives from the Old Testament. Islamic mythology also shares many of the same stories; for instance, a creation-account spaced out over six periods, the legend of Abraham, the stories of Moses and the Israelites, and many more.

== Tanakh ==
The writings of the biblical prophets, including Isaiah, Ezekiel, and Jeremiah, express a concept of the divine that is distinct from the mythologies of its neighbors. Instead of seeing the god of Israel as just one national god, these writings describe Yahweh as the one God of the Universe.

The prophetic writings condemned Hebrew participation in nature worship, and did not completely identify the divine with natural forces.

Through the prophets' influence, Jewish theology increasingly portrayed God as independent from nature and acting independently of natural forces. Instead of eternally repeating a seasonal cycle of acts, Yahweh stood outside nature and intervened in it, producing new, historically unprecedented events; Mircea Eliade wrote: "That was theophany of a new type, hitherto unknown—the intervention of Jahveh in history. It was therefore something irreversible and unrepeatable. The fall of Jerusalem does not repeat the fall of Samaria: the ruin of Jerusalem presents a new historic theophany, another 'wrath' of Jahveh. […] Jahveh stands out from the world of abstractions, of symbols and generalities; he acts in history and enters into relations with actual historical beings."

== Themes and narratives ==
=== Creation narrative ===
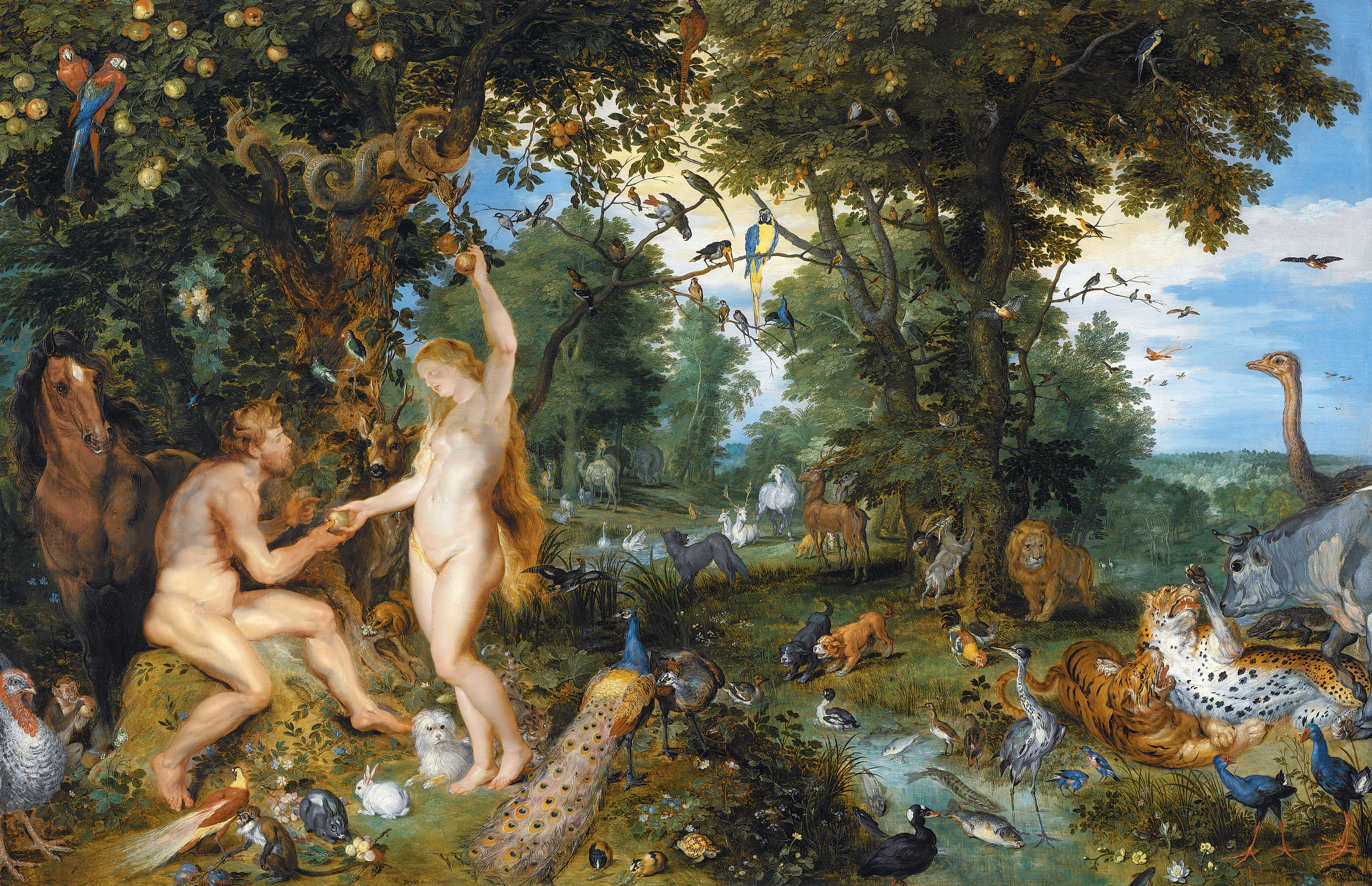
The Garden of Eden with the Fall of Man. Illustration of God's creation

Two creation stories are found in the first two chapters of the Book of Genesis. In the first, Elohim, the Hebrew generic word for God, creates the heavens and the earth in six days, then rests on, blesses and sanctifies the seventh. In the second story, God, now referred to by the personal name Yahweh, creates Adam, the first man, from dust and places him in the Garden of Eden, where he is given dominion over the animals. Eve, the first woman, is created from Adam and as his companion. God creates by spoken command and names the elements of the world as he creates them.

Genesis 1:1–2:3 creation order:

- Day 1 – Creation of light (and, by implication, time).
- Day 2 – The firmament. In Genesis 1:17 the stars are set in the firmament.
- Day 3 – Creating a ring of ocean surrounding a single circular continent. God does not create or make trees and plants, but instead commands the earth to produce them.
- Day 4 – God puts "lights" in the firmament to "rule over" the day and the night, referring to the "sun" and "moon".
- Day 5 – Creation of the living creatures.
- Day 6 – Creation of first man, Adam.
- Day 7 – Creation is followed by rest.

In the second story (Genesis 2:4–2:25) the order is different; God created man, the Garden of Eden and planted trees, the living creatures and then the first woman.

==== The "combat myth" ====
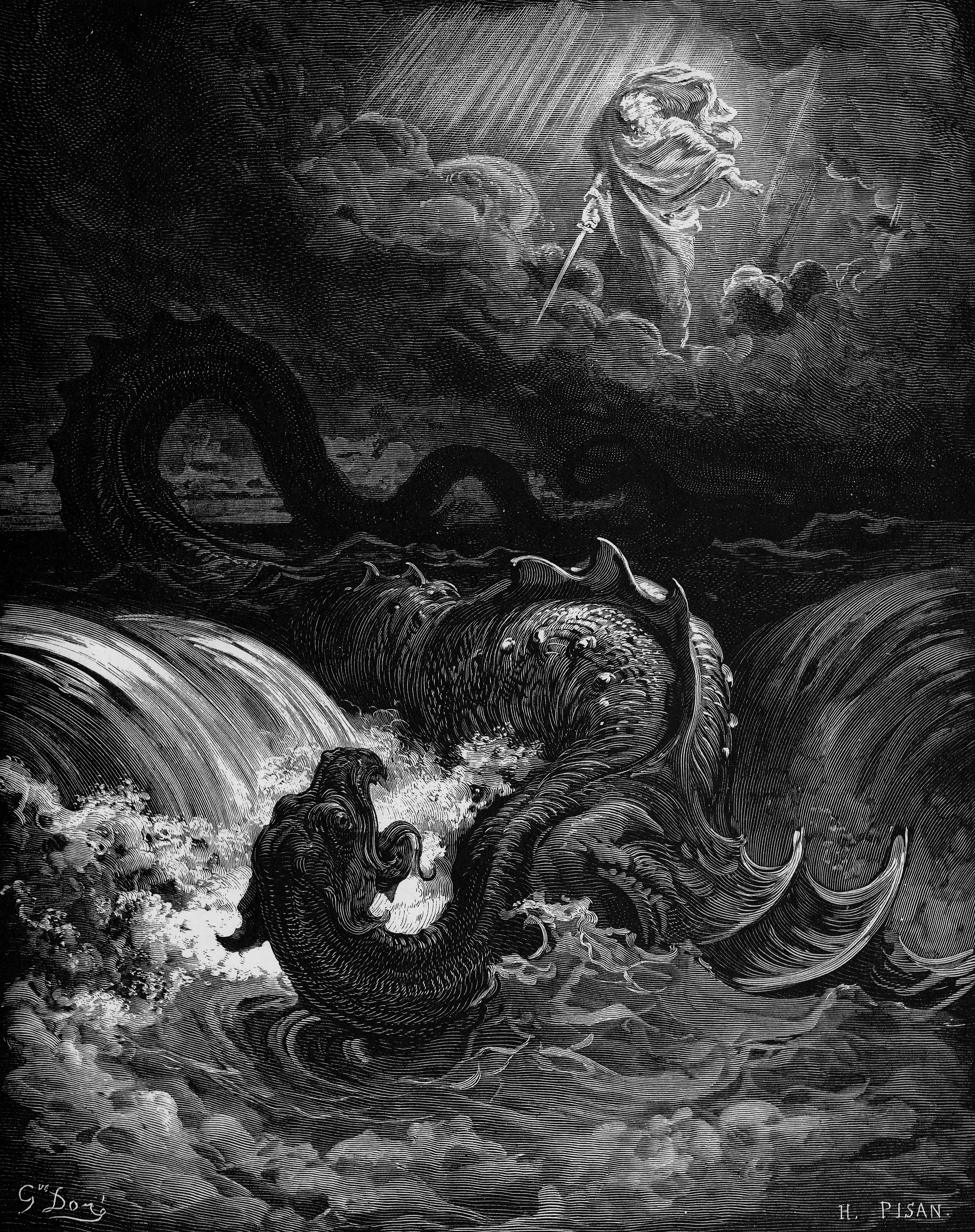
Destruction of Leviathan, 1865 by Gustave Doré. The Hebrew Bible mentions this sea monster six times.

Many of the Hebrews' neighbors had a "combat myth" about the good god battling the demon of chaos; one example of this mytheme is the Babylonian Enûma Eliš. A lesser known example is the very fragmentary myth of Labbu. According to historian Bernard McGinn, the combat myth's imagery influenced Jewish mythology. The myth of God's triumph over Leviathan, a symbol of chaos, has the form of a combat myth. In addition, McGinn thinks the Hebrews applied the combat myth motif to the relationship between God and Satan. Originally a deputy in God's court, assigned to act as mankind's "accuser" (satan means "to oppose" – Hebrew: שָּׂטָן satan, meaning "adversary"), Satan evolved into a being with "an apparently independent realm of operation as a source of evil" – no longer God's deputy but his opponent in a cosmic struggle.

Even the Exodus story shows combat-myth influence. McGinn believes the "Song of the Sea", which the Hebrews sang after seeing God drown the Egyptian army in Yam Suph, includes "motifs and language from the combat myth used to emphasize the importance of the foundational event in Israel's religious identity: the crossing of the Red Sea and deliverance from the Pharaoh". Likewise, Armstrong notes the similarity between pagan myths in which gods "split the sea in half when they created the world" and the story of the Exodus from Egypt, in which Moses splits the Sea of Reeds (the Red Sea) – "though what is being brought into being in the Exodus, is not a cosmos but a people". In any case, the motif of God as the "divine warrior" fighting on Israel's behalf is clearly evident in the Song of the Sea (Ex. 15). This motif recurs in poetry throughout the Hebrew Scriptures (I Samuel 2; Zechariah 9:11–16;14:3-8).

Some comparative mythologists think Jewish mythology absorbed elements from pagan mythology. According to these scholars, even while resisting pagan worship, the Jews willingly absorbed elements of pagan mythology.

=== Origin myth ===
==== Adam and Eve ====
According to the creation narratives in Genesis, Adam and Eve were the first man and woman. In the Book of Genesis of the Hebrew Bible, chapters one through five, there are two creation narratives with two distinct perspectives. In the first, Adam and Eve (though not referenced by name) were created together in God's image and jointly given instructions to multiply and to be stewards over everything else that God had made. In the second narrative, God fashions Adam from dust and places him in the Garden of Eden where he is to have dominion over the plants and animals. God places a tree in the garden which he prohibits Adam from eating the fruit of. Eve is later created from one of Adam's ribs to be Adam's companion.

==== Garden of Eden ====
The Expulsion of Adam and Eve

The biblical story of Garden of Eden, most notably in the Book of Genesis chapters 2 and 3, and also in the Book of Ezekiel depicts Adam and Eve as walking around the Garden of Eden naked due to their innocence. The man was free to eat off of any tree in the garden, but forbidden to eat from the tree of knowledge of good and evil. Last of all, the LORD God made a woman (Eve) from a rib of the man to be a companion to the man. However, the serpent tricks Eve into eating fruit from the forbidden tree. Following Eve, Adam broke the commandment and ate of the forbidden fruit. God curses only the serpent and the ground. He prophetically tells the woman and the man what will be the consequences of their sin of disobeying God. Then he banishes "the man" from the Garden of Eden to prevent him from eating also of the tree of life, and thus living for ever. East of the garden there were placed Cherubim, "and a flaming sword which turned every way, to keep the way of the tree of life". (Gen.3:24)

The story of the Garden of Eden makes theological use of mythological themes to explain human progression from a state of innocence and bliss to the present human condition of knowledge of sin, misery, and death.

==== Tower of Babel ====
The Tower of Babel by Pieter Bruegel the Elder (1563)

The story of the Tower of Babel explains the origin of different human languages. According to the story, which is recorded in Genesis 11:1–9, everyone on earth spoke the same language. As people migrated from the east, they settled in the land of Shinar (Mesopotamia). People there sought to make bricks and build a city and a tower with its top in the sky, to make a name for themselves, so that they not be scattered over the world. God came down to look at the city and tower, and remarked that as one people with one language, nothing that they sought would be out of their reach. God went down and confounded their speech, so that they could not understand each other, and scattered them over the face of the earth, and they stopped building the city. Thus the city was called Babel.

=== Flood narrative ===
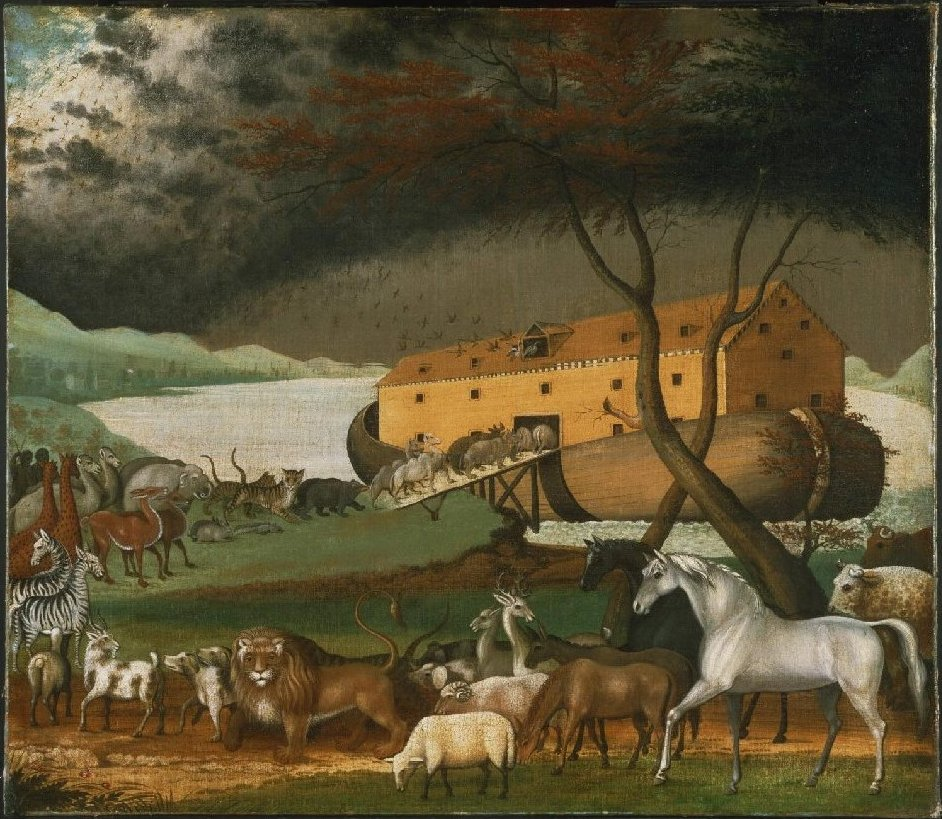
Noah's Ark, oil on canvas painting by Edward Hicks, 1846 Philadelphia Museum of Art

The Genesis flood narrative has similarities to ancient flood stories told worldwide. One of the closest parallels is the Mesopotamian myth of a world flood, recorded in The Epic of Gilgamesh. In the Hebrew Bible flood story (Genesis 6:5–22), God decides to flood the world and start over, due to mankind's sinfulness. However, God sees that a man named Noah was righteous (because he walked with God) and blameless among the people. God instructs Noah to build an ark and directs him to bring at least two of every animal inside the boat, along with his family. The flood comes and covers the world. After 40 days, Noah sends a raven to check whether the waters have subsided, then a dove; after exiting the boat, Noah offers a sacrifice to God, who smells "the sweet savour" and promises never to destroy the earth by water again – making the rainbow a symbol of this promise. Similarly, in the Mesopotamian Epic of Gilgamesh, the bustle of humanity disturbs the gods, who decide to send a flood. Warned by one of the gods, a man named Utnapishtim builds a boat and takes his family and animals inside. After the flood, Utnapishtim sends a dove, then a swallow, then a raven to check whether the waters have subsided. After exiting the boat, Utnapishtim offers a sacrifice to the gods, who smell "the sweet savour" and repent their choice to send the flood.

Another ancient flood myth is the Hindu story of Matsya the fish. According to this story, the god Vishnu takes the form of a fish and warns the ancestor Manu about a coming flood. He tells Manu to put all the creatures of the earth into a boat. Unlike the biblical flood, however, this flood is not a unique event brought on by a divine choice; instead, it's one of the destructions and recreations of the universe that happen at regular intervals in Hindu mythology. This recurrence also happens in Mesopotamian floods or disasters, although is because of the discontent of the gods because of the noise made by humans, told in the Erra Epic.

=== National myth ===
==== The Patriarchs ====
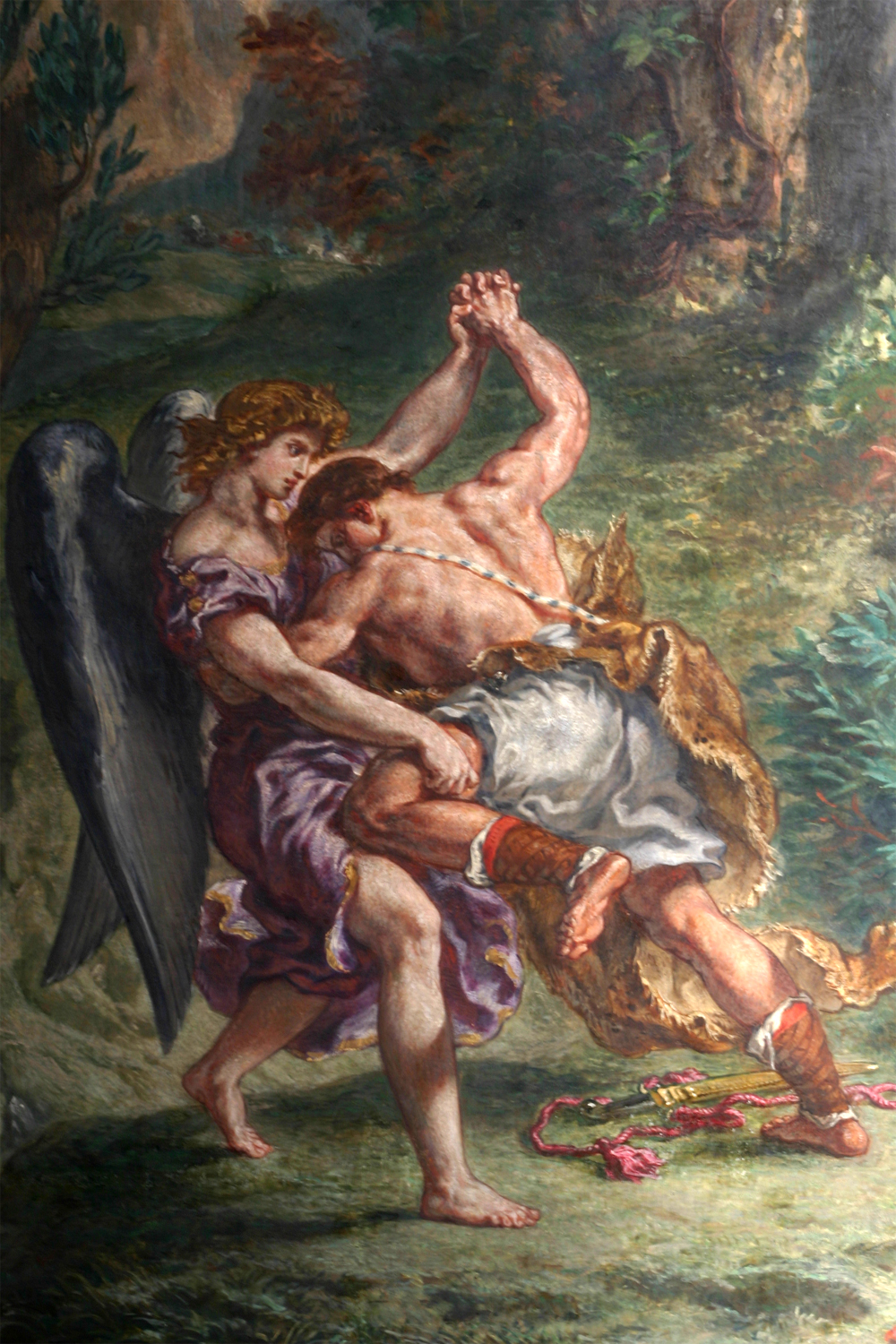
Jacob Wrestling with the Angel

The Patriarchs in Hebrew bible are Abraham, his son Isaac, and Isaac's son Jacob, also named Israel, the ancestor of the Israelites. These three figures are referred to collectively as the patriarchs of Judaism, and the period in which they lived is known as the patriarchal age. The narrative in Genesis revolves around the themes of posterity and land. Abraham is called by God to leave the house of his father Terah and settle in the land originally given to Canaan but which God now promises to Abraham and his progeny. Various candidates are put forward who might inherit the land after Abraham; and, while promises are made to Ishmael about founding a great nation, Isaac, Abraham's son by his half-sister Sarah, inherits God's promises to Abraham. Jacob is the son of Isaac and Rebecca and regarded as a Patriarch of the Israelites as his twelve sons became the progenitors of the "Tribes of Israel".

==== The Exodus ====
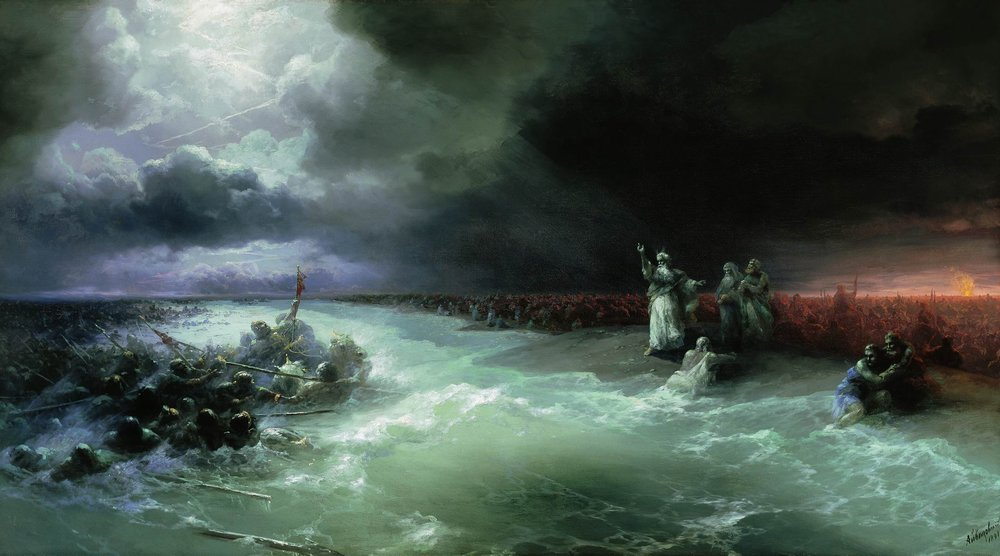
Passage of the Jews through the Red Sea

The story of the exodus is told in the books of Exodus, Leviticus, Numbers, and Deuteronomy. The Israelites had settled in the Land of Goshen in the time of Joseph and Jacob, but a new pharaoh arose who enslaved and oppressed the children of Israel. At this time Moses was born; the Pharaoh had commanded that all male Hebrew children born would be drowned in the river Nile, but Moses' mother placed him in an ark and concealed the ark in the bulrushes by the riverbank, where the baby was discovered and adopted by Pharaoh's daughter, and raised as an Egyptian. One day after Moses had reached adulthood he killed an Egyptian who was beating a Hebrew. Moses, in order to escape the Pharaoh's death penalty, fled to Midian.

There, on Mount Horeb, God appeared to Moses as a burning bush revealed to Moses his name YHWH and commanded him to return to Egypt and bring his chosen people (Israel) out of bondage and into the Promised Land. During the journey, God tried to kill Moses, but Zipporah saved his life. Moses returned to carry out God's command, but God caused the Pharaoh to refuse, and only after God had subjected Egypt to ten plagues did the Pharaoh relent. Moses led the Israelites to the border of Egypt, but there God hardened the Pharaoh's heart once more, so that he could destroy the Pharaoh and his army at the Red Sea Crossing as a sign of his power to Israel and the nations.

From Egypt, Moses led the Israelites to biblical Mount Sinai, where he was given the Ten Commandments from God, written on stone tablets. Later at Mount Sinai, Moses and the elders entered into a covenant, by which Israel would become the people of YHWH, obeying his laws, and YHWH would be their god. Moses delivered the laws of God to Israel, instituted the priesthood under the sons of Moses' brother Aaron, and destroyed those Israelites who fell away from his worship.

During the forty years of wandering in the wilderness battles were fought with the Amalekites, Canaanites and Amorites. Yahweh commanded in the battle with the Amorites to leave no survivors, women and children included, while he miraculously provided the Israelites with mana from the sky and sometimes quail to eat, water was procured from a rock when stuck with a rod by Moses. Yahweh sent plagues and or poisonous snakes to kill dissenters whenever there was dissent against him or Moses. Though when Moses struck a rock more times than Yahweh told him Yahweh barred Moses from entering the Promised Land along with all those who came with him out of Egypt, except for Caleb and Joshua. Upon the death of Moses and after the death of Aaron, Yahweh appointed Joshua to lead the Israelites across the Jordan River to the Promised Land which was yet to be conquered.

William Propp in his commentary on Exodus 19-40, identified literary themes within it that are common in ancient Near Eastern myths.

=== Heroic narratives ===
==== Gideon ====
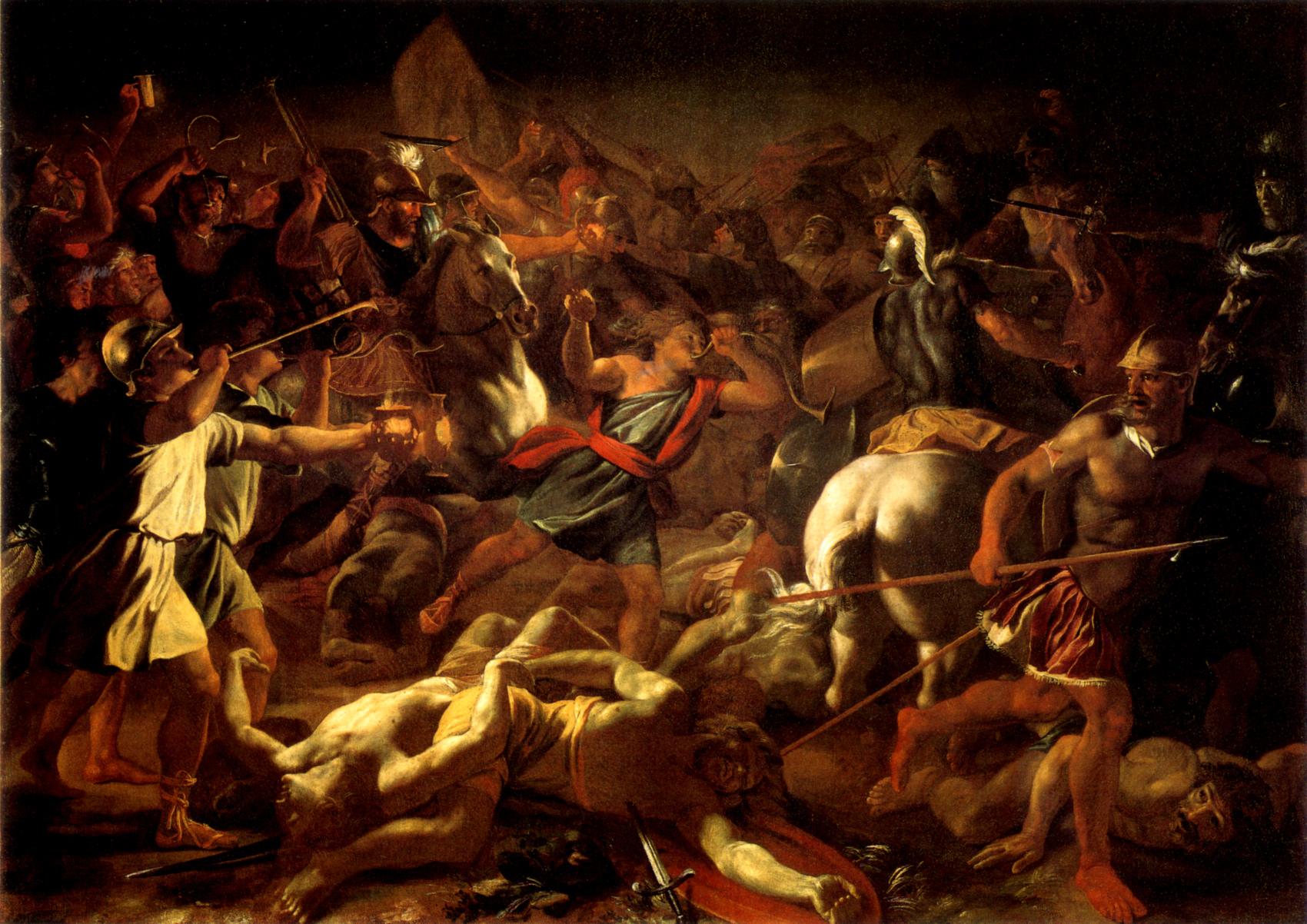
Gideon's victory over the Midianites

Gideon was a military leader, judge and prophet whose calling and victory over the Midianites was decisive. He went on to send out messengers to gather together men in order to meet an armed force of the people of Midian and the Amalek that had crossed the Jordan River, and they encamped at the Well of Harod in the Valley of Jezreel. But God informed Gideon that the men he had gathered were too many – with so many men, there would be reason for the Israelites to claim the victory as their own instead of acknowledging that God had saved them. At first Gideon sent home those men who were afraid and invited any man who wanted to leave, to do so; 22,000 men returned home and 10,000 remained. Yet with the number, God told Gideon they were still too many; Gideon brought his troops to the water, where all those who lap the water with their tongues, were put to one side; all those who kneel down to drink, putting their hands to their mouths, were put to the other side. The number of those that lapped was three hundred; but all the rest of the troops knelt down to drink water. Then the Lord said to Gideon, "With the three hundred that lapped I will deliver you, and give the Midianites into your hand. Let all the others go to their homes". (Judges 7:4–7).

During the night, God instructed Gideon to approach the Midianite camp. There, Gideon overheard a Midianite man tell a friend of a dream in which "a loaf of barley bread tumbled into the camp of Midian" (Judges 7:13), causing their tent or camp to collapse. This was interpreted as meaning that God had given the Midianites over to Gideon. Gideon returned to the Israelite camp and gave each of his men a trumpet (shofar) and a clay jar with a torch hidden inside. Divided into three companies, Gideon and his 300 men marched on the enemy camp. He instructed them to blow the trumpet, give a battle cry and light torches, simulating an attack by a large force. As they did so, the Midianite army fled (Judges 7:17–22). Later, their leaders were caught and killed.

==== Samson ====
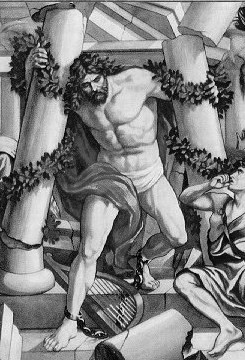
Samson destroys the temple

Samson was the last of the judges of the ancient Israelites mentioned in the Book of Judges. The biblical account states that Samson was a Nazirite, and that he was given immense strength to aid him against his enemies and allow him to perform superhuman feats, however, if Samson's long hair was cut, then his Nazirite vow would be violated and he would lose his strength. The first instance of this is seen when Samson was on his way to ask for the Philistine woman's hand in marriage, when he was attacked by a lion. He simply grabbed it and ripped it apart, as the spirit of God divinely empowered him. After the Philistines burned Samson's wife and father-in-law to death, Samson, in revenge, slaughtered many more Philistines, saying, "I have done to them what they did to me". Samson then took refuge in a cave in the rock of Etam. An army of Philistines came to the Tribe of Judah and demanded that 3,000 men of Judah deliver them Samson. In order to avoid a war and with Samson's consent, they tied him with two new ropes and were about to hand him over to the Philistines when he broke free of the ropes. Using the jawbone of a donkey, he slew 1,000 Philistines.

Samson falls in love with Delilah in the valley of Sorek. The Philistines approach Delilah and induce her with 1,100 silver coins to find the secret of Samson's strength so that they can capture their enemy. While Samson refuses to reveal the secret and teases her with false answers, he is finally worn down and tells Delilah that God supplies his power because of his consecration to God as a Nazirite and that if his hair is cut off he will lose his strength. Delilah then woos him to sleep "in her lap" and calls for a servant to shave his hair. Samson loses his strength and he is captured by the Philistines who blind him by gouging out his eyes. They then take him to Gaza, imprison him, and put him to work turning a large millstone and grinding corn.

One day, the Philistine leaders assemble in a temple for a religious sacrifice to Dagon, for having delivered Samson into their hands. They summon Samson so that people can watch him perform for them. The temple is so crowded and all the rulers of the entire government of Philistia have gathered there too, some 3,000 people in all. Samson is led into the temple, and he asks his captors to let him lean against the supporting pillars to rest. He prays for strength and God gives him strength to break the pillars, causing the temple to collapse, killing him and the people inside.

Academics have interpreted Samson as a demigod (such as Heracles or Enkidu) enfolded into Jewish religious lore, or as an archetypical folk hero.

==== David and Goliath ====
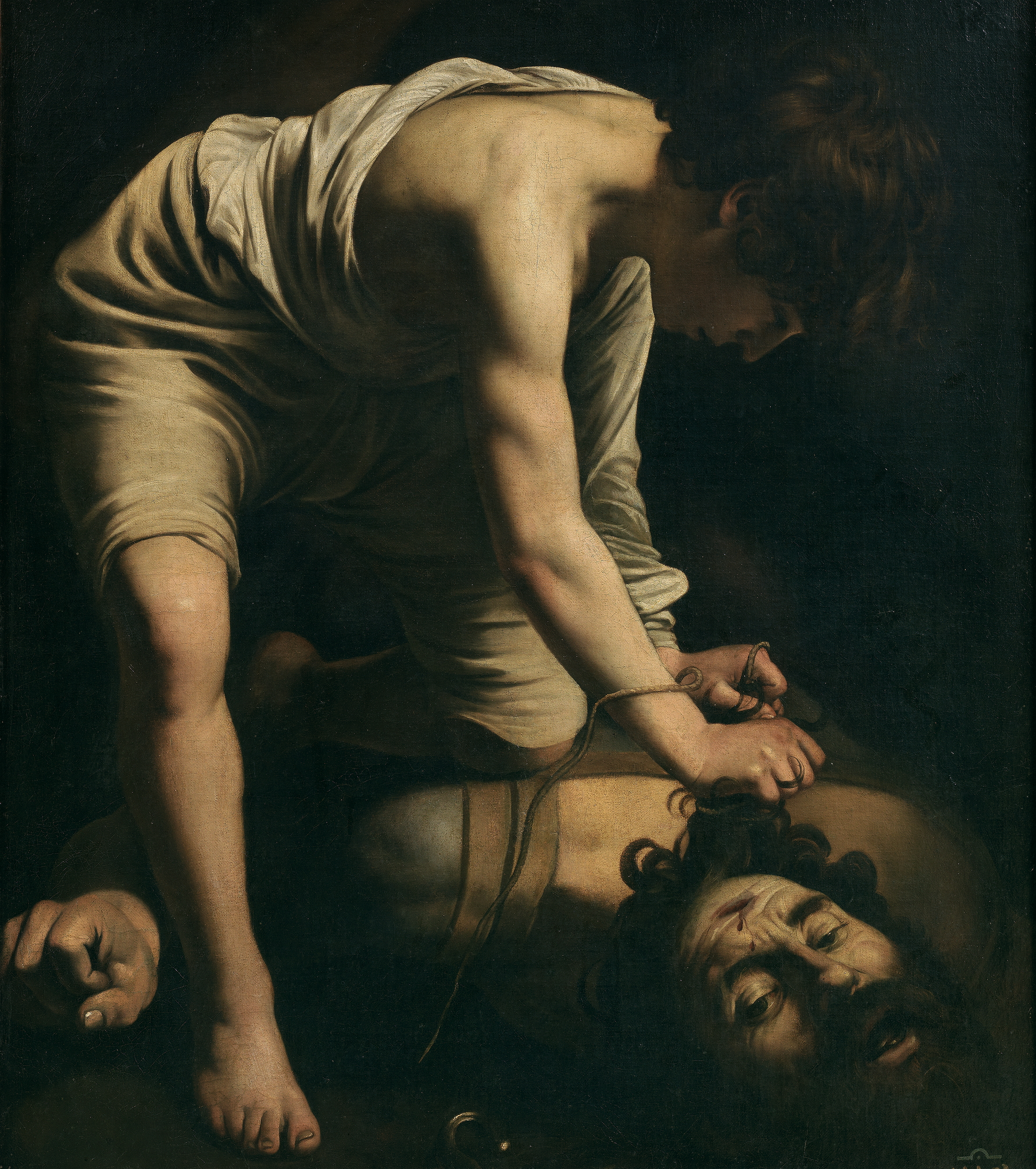
David and Goliath

According to the Book of Samuel, Saul and the Israelites are facing the Philistines in the Valley of Elah. Goliath, the champion of the Philistines, comes out between the lines and challenges the Israelites to send out a champion of their own to decide the outcome in single combat, but Saul is afraid. David, bringing food for his elder brothers, hears that Goliath has defied the armies of God and of the reward from Saul to the one that defeats him, and accepts the challenge. Saul reluctantly agrees and offers his armor, which David declines, taking only his staff, sling (Hebrew: קָלַע qāla‘) and five stones from a brook.

David and Goliath confront each other, Goliath with his armor and javelin, David with his staff and sling. David hurls a stone from his sling and hits Goliath in the center of his forehead, Goliath falls on his face to the ground, and David cuts off his head. The Philistines flee and are pursued by the Israelites "as far as Gath and the gates of Ekron". David puts the armor of Goliath in his own tent and takes the head to Jerusalem, and Saul sends Abner to bring the boy to him. The king asks whose son he is, and David answers, "I am the son of your servant Jesse the Bethlehemite."

=== Watchers ===
Also possibly derived from pagan mythology is the story of the "Watchers" (Genesis 6:1–4). According to this story, heavenly beings once descended to earth, intermarried with humans, and produced the nephilim, "the heroes of old, men of renown". Jewish tradition regards those heavenly beings as wicked angels, but the myth may represent a fragment of pagan mythology about gods interbreeding with humans to produce heroes.

== Zoroastrian influence ==
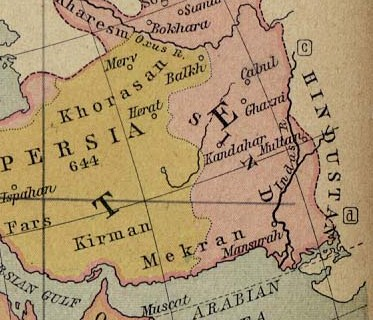
Names of territories during the Caliphate in 750 CE. Khorasan was a province of Persia in yellow.

R. C. Zaehner, a professor of Eastern religions, argues for Zoroastrianism's direct influence on Jewish eschatological myths, especially the resurrection of the dead with rewards and punishments.

=== Linear history ===
The mythologist Joseph Campbell believed the Judeo-Christian-Islamic idea of linear history originated with the Iranian religion of Zoroastrianism. In the mythologies of India and the Far East, "the world was not to be reformed, but only known, revered, and its laws obeyed". In contrast, in Zoroastrianism, the current world is "corrupt [...] and to be reformed by human action". According to Campbell, this "progressive view of cosmic history" "can be heard echoed and re-echoed, in Greek, Latin, Hebrew and Aramaean, Arabic, and every tongue of the West".

Other traditional cultures limited mythical events to the beginning of time, and saw important historical events as repetitions of those mythical events. According to Mircea Eliade, the Hebrew prophets "valorized" history, seeing historical events as episodes in a continual divine revelation. This doesn't mean that all historical events have significance in Judaism; however, in Jewish mythology, significant events happen throughout history, and they are not merely repetitions of each other; each significant event is a new act of God:

"The fall of Samaria actually did occur in history [...] It was therefore something irreversible and unrepeatable. The fall of Jerusalem does not repeat the fall of Samaria: the ruin of Jerusalem presents a new historic theophany."

By portraying time as a linear progression of events, rather than an eternal repetition, Jewish mythology suggested the possibility for progress. Inherited by Christianity, this view of history has deeply influenced Western philosophy and culture. Even supposedly secular or political Western movements have worked within the world-view of progress and linear history inherited from Judaism. Because of this legacy, the religious historian Mircea Eliade argues that "Judaeo-Christianity makes an innovation of the first importance" in mythology.

Eliade believes that the Hebrews had a sense of linear time before their contact with Zoroastrianism, but agrees with Zaehner that Judaism elaborated its mythology of linear time with eschatological elements that originated in Zoroastrianism. According to Eliade, these elements include ethical dualism, the myth of a savior, and "an optimistic eschatology, proclaiming the final triumph of Good".

== Talmud ==
The Jewish people's tendency to adopt the neighboring pagan practices, denounced as it had been by the Jewish prophets, returned with force during the Talmudic period. However, almost no mythology was borrowed until the Midrashic and Talmudic periods, when what can be described as mysticism emerged in the kabbalistic schools.

=== Shedim ===
One such aspect was the appearance of the shedim; these became ubiquitous to the ordinary Jews with the increased access to the study of the Talmud after the invention of the printing press.

=== Dreams ===
The classical rabbis themselves were at times not free from sharing in the popular beliefs. Thus, while there is a whole catalog of prognostications by means of dreams in Ber. 55 et seq., and instructions for ameliorating those dreams and Rabbi Johanan claimed that those dreams are true which come in the morning or are dreamed about us by others, or are repeated, Rabbi Meïr declares that dreams help not and injure not.

Dream interpretation is not a factor in mythologization of Talmud knowledge, as it was within a wider movement of nascent development that later became Psychology, incorporating Astrology, and effect of digestion on behaviour.

=== The Keresh and the Tigris of the Bei Ilai ===
An example of typical mythology in the Talmud exists as a discussion about a giant deer and a giant lion which both originated in a mythical forest called "Bei Ilai". (Bei means house in Aramaic) The deer is called "Keresh" (Jewish Babylonian Aramaic: קֶרֶשׁ, romanized: qeresh), it has one horn, and its skin measures 15 cubits in length.

The Roman emperor Hadrian once asked Joshua ben Hananiah to show him the Lion of Bei Ilai, since every lion can be killed, but the Rabbi refused and pointed out that this is not a normal lion. The emperor insisted, so the Rabbi reluctantly called for the lion of "Bei Ilai". He roared once from a distance of 400 parasangs, and all pregnant women miscarried and all the city walls of Rome tumbled down. Then he came to 300 parasangs and roared again, and the front teeth and molars of Roman men fell out, and even the emperor himself fell from his throne. He begged the Rabbi to send it back. The Rabbi prayed, and it returned to its place.

=== Traditional folk beliefs ===
The authorities of the Talmud seem to be particularly influenced by popular conception in the direction of folk medicine. A belief in the Evil eye was also prevalent in Talmudic times, and occasionally omens were taken seriously, though in some cases recognized as being merely popular beliefs. Thus, while it is declared to be unlucky to do things twice, as eating, drinking, or washing, Rabbi Dunai recognized that this was an old tradition.

=== Planting huppah trees ===
A remarkable custom mentioned in the Talmud is that of planting trees when children are born and intertwining them to form the huppah when they marry. This idea is also found in India.

=== Mythological components of Haggadic exegesis ===
It may be possible to distinguish in the haggadic legends of biblical character those portions that probably formed part of the original accounts from those that have been developed by the exegetic principles of the haggadists.

The uniqueness of the Talmudic style of both recording meaning and deriving it using exegesis places the many seemingly mythological components of the much larger halachic content into a content very unlike the purely story-telling corpus of other cultures.

== In popular culture ==
In the past century to modern day, there have been many retellings of Jewish myths (mostly from the Torah), and adaptations for the modern public. They have mostly been in the regions of science fiction, as Isaac Asimov noted in his introduction to More Wandering Stars:

Can science fiction be part of Jewish culture? From fantasy stories we know?/ And as I think of it, it begins to seem to me that it is and we do know. And the source? From where else? From the Hebrew source for everything-- From the Bible. We have but to look through the Bible to see for ourselves.

— Isaac Asimov

He goes on to show parallels between biblical stories and modern science fiction tropes:

- Let there be light was an example of advanced scientific mechanisms
- God is an extraterrestrial
- Adam and Eve as colonists on a new planet
- The serpent was an alien, as Earth snakes don't speak or show any intelligence
- The flood was a story of a world catastrophe, and the survivors
- The Tower of Babel (like Metropolis, which it inspired in part)
- Moses vs. the Egyptian magicians is advanced technological warfare
- Samson as sword and sorcery
- The first chapter of Ezekiel is a UFO account.

The Hugo Awards, one of the highest distinctions for science fiction writers, have been awarded to biblically derived stories. For instance Harlan Ellison's "I Have No Mouth, and I Must Scream", Larry Niven's "Inconstant Moon" and Harlan Ellison's "The Deathbird".

Another example is Hideaki Anno's Neon Genesis Evangelion anime series, which uses kabbalah elements while narrating a reinterpretation of events surrounding Adam, Eve and Lilith in a futuristic and apocalyptic way.

Edward M. Erdelac's Weird West book and short story series Merkabah Rider features a Hasidic mystic gunslinger and draws heavily from Jewish myth and folklore.

It is often suggested that Jerry Siegel and Joe Shuster, the two Jewish creators of Superman, essentially the beginning of superhero comics and comic books, were partly inspired by the story of the Golem of Prague.

== See also ==
- Lilith
- Succubus
- Incubus
- Jewish folklore
- Zohar
- Kabbalah
- Archangel
- Merkabah mysticism
- Religion and mythology
