= List of legendary creatures (E) =

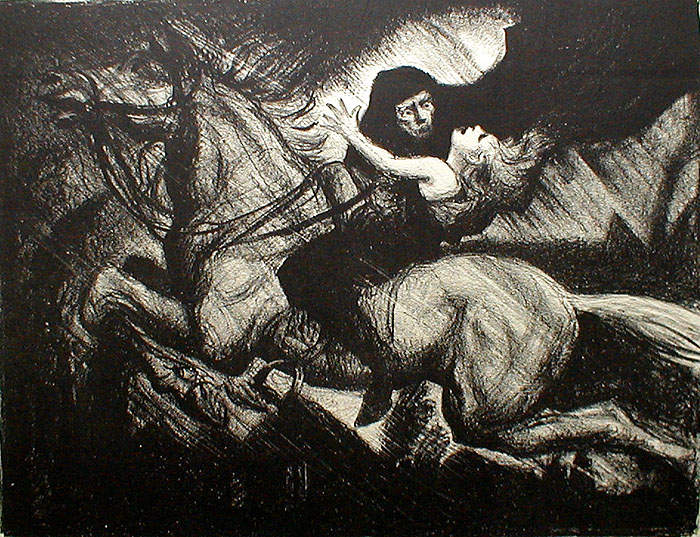
"The Erlking", by Albert Sterner, ca. 1910

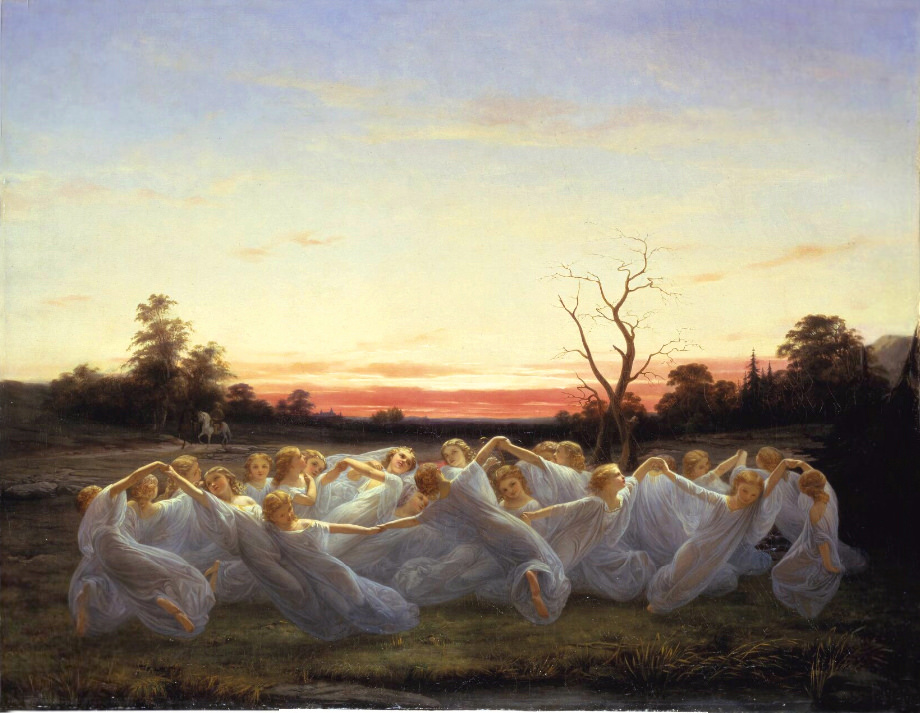
Elves

1. Easter Bunny (Christianity) – Anthropomorphic lagomorph.
2. Easter Bilby (Australian) – Anthropomorphic bilby.
3. Each Uisge (Scottish) – Malevolent water horse
4. Eagle Spirit (Many cultures worldwide) – Leadership or guidance totem
5. Ebu Gogo (Flores) – Diminutive humanoids, possibly inspired by Homo floresiensis
6. Echidna (Greek) – Half-woman, half-snake monster
7. Echeneis (Medieval Bestiaries) – Remora, said to attach to ships to slow them down
8. Edimmu (Sumerian) – Ghosts of those not buried properly
9. Egbere (Yoruba) – Humanoid that carries a magical mat
10. Eikthyrnir (Norse) – The stag of Valhalla
11. Einherjar (Norse) – Spirits of brave warriors
12. Ekek (Philippine) – Flesh-eating, winged humanoids
13. Elbow Witch (Ojibwa) – Hags with awls in their elbows
14. Eldjötnar (Norse) – Fire Giants who reside in Muspelheim, with Surtr as their leader
15. Elemental (Alchemy) – Personification of one of the Classical elements
16. ‘Elepaio (Hawaiian) – Monarch flycatcher spirit that guides canoe-builders to the proper trees
17. Elf (Germanic) – Nature and fertility spirit
18. Eloko (Central Africa) – Little people and malevolent nature spirits
19. El Silbón (Venezuela) – Lost soul
20. Elwetritsch (German) – Birdlike forest creature of the Palatinate and Pennsylvania Dutch country
21. Emere (Yoruba) – Child that can move back and forth between the material world and the afterlife at will
22. Emim (Jewish) – Giant
23. Empusa (Greek) – Female demon that waylays travelers and seduces and kills men
24. Encantado (Brazilian) – Dolphin-human shapeshifter
25. Enchanted Moor (Portuguese) – Enchanted princesses
26. Enenra (Japanese) – Smoke spirit
27. Enfield (Heraldic) – Fox-greyhound-lion-wolf-eagle hybrid
28. Engkanto (Philippine) – Neutral nature spirit
29. Enkō (Japanese) – Kappa of Shikoku and western Honshū
30. Epimeliad (Greek) – Apple tree nymph
31. Erchitu (Sardinia) – Ox-human, wereox
32. Er Gui (Chinese) – Hungry ghost
33. Erinyes (Greek) – Winged spirits of vengeance or justice, also known as Furies
34. Erlking (German) – Death spirit
35. Erymanthian Boar (Greek) – Giant boar
36. Ethiopian Pegasus (Medieval Bestiaries) – Horned, winged horse
37. Etiäinen (Finnish) – Spirit being of a living person
38. Ettin (English) – Two-headed giant
39. Eurynomos (Greek) – Blue-black, carrion-eater in the underworld
40. Ewah (Cherokee) – Human-cougar hybrid
41. Ežerinis (Lithuanian) – Lake spirit
