= Plenty Coups =

American Indian chief

- Alaxchíia Ahú
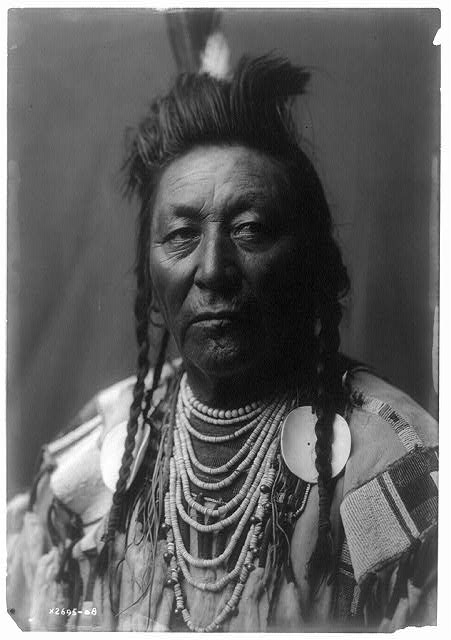
- Portrait of Plenty Coups (c. 1908, aged about 60)

Crow Tribe leader

Personal details
- Born: Chíilaphuchissaaleesh ("Buffalo Bull Facing The Wind") c. 1848 The-cliffs-that-have-no-name (possibly near Billings, Montana)
- Died: 1932 Chief Plenty Coups (Alek-Chea-Ahoosh) State Park and Home, Crow Indian Reservation, Montana
- Spouse: Strikes-the-iron
- Parent(s): Medicine-Bird, Otter-woman
- Known for: Defending Crow lands in Washington, D.C., promoting education for Indian youth

Plenty Coups (Crow: Alaxchíia Ahú, "many achievements"; c. 1848 – 1932) was the principal chief of the Crow Tribe and a visionary leader.

He allied the Crow with the whites when the war for the West was being fought because the Sioux and Cheyenne (who opposed white settlement of the area) were the traditional enemies of the Crow. Plenty Coups had also experienced a vision when he was very young that non-Native American people would ultimately take control of his homeland (Montana), so he always felt that cooperation would benefit his people much more than opposition. He very much wanted the Crow to survive as a people and their customs and spiritual beliefs to carry on. His efforts on their behalf ensured that this happened, and he led his people peacefully into the 20th century.

One of his famous quotes is: "Education is your greatest weapon. With education you are the white man's equal, without education you are his victim and so shall remain all of your lives. Study, learn, help one another always. Remember there is only poverty and misery in idleness and dreams – but in work there is self respect and independence." Chief Plenty Coups became a chief at the age of twenty-nine; he is the last chief who was elected a chief by other chiefs.

== Early life ==
Plenty Coups was born into the Crow ("Apsáalooke") tribe in about 1848 at the-cliffs-that-have-no-name (possibly near Billings, Montana), to his father Medicine-Bird and his mother Otter-woman. He was given the birth name Chíilaphuchissaaleesh, or "Buffalo Bull Facing The Wind".

During the first decades of Plenty Coups' life, he led the life of a Crow warrior, which involved warring with other major tribes such as the Sioux and Cheyenne over territory, hunting rights, prestige, and the other parts of the traditional warrior way of life.

=== Change of name ===
In accordance with tradition, as a young man his birth name was changed: his grandfather predicted that he would become chief of the Crow Tribe, live a very long life, and accomplish many great deeds, thus christening him Alaxchiiaahush, meaning "many achievements". Plenty Coups is the English translation of his name, coming from the word coup, or act of bravery. Over the course of his life, he would live up to his name and his grandfather's prediction.

=== Visions of the future ===
Early in his life, Plenty Coups started having prophetic dreams and visions. Many seemed so far-fetched that no one believed them, but when they started coming true, his fellow tribe members began to revere him and listened to him carefully.

After the death of his beloved older brother when he was nine years old, he had a vision in which one of the Little People of the Pryor Mountains told him to develop his senses and wits, and that if he used them well, he would become a chief. As he later said:

I had a will and I would use it, make it work for me, as the Dwarf-chief had advised. I became very happy, lying there looking up into the sky. My heart began to sing like a bird, and I went back to the village, needing no man to tell me the meaning of my dream. I took a sweat-bath and rested in my father's lodge. I knew myself now."

Later, when he was 11 years old, Plenty Coups (along with other young men of the Crow Nation) was challenged to have a vision which might guide his people's future. After fasting and spending several days in the Crazy Mountains, he had a vision in which he saw many buffalo coming out of a hole. They spread over the plains, then disappeared. Surreal buffalo with weird tails, different colors (even spots), and odd bellows then came out of the hole and covered the plains. He saw himself as an old man, living near a cold spring in the foothills of the Arrowhead Mountains. He also saw a forest; strong winds blew down the trees in the forest until only one tree was left standing. In it was the home of the chickadee.

His vision was interpreted by tribal elders to mean that the white man would take over the Native American lands and their way of life, like the wind that blew down the trees in the forest—all except one, which represented the Crow people. The Crow tribe would be spared if they could learn how to work with the white man. His spirit guide then became the chickadee, and he would carry a pair of chickadee legs in a medicine bag he used for protection and spiritual power. This vision would guide his actions (and that of the Crow People) for the remainder of his life.

== Earning his new name ==
=== Young warrior ===
Plenty Coups started learning early in life the ways of an Indian warrior. Constant attacks by neighboring tribes provided many opportunities to prove his valor, and he quickly started earning coups. He spent his youth fighting and learning alongside many other young warriors, including Medicine Crow (Sacred Raven), who would also become a chief. Many times he would cover himself with a gray wolf hide, and sneak alone into an enemy camp and scout about. He would return to his fellow warriors and devise a plan of attack. They would execute the attack, and Plenty Coups would seek to touch an enemy with his coup stick or take a weapon or horse, then return without being killed or captured. This was considered a greater act of bravery than actually killing an enemy.

He soon gained a reputation for being fearless and cunning, like the wolf. He became a member of the elite warriors of his tribe. They would do everything backwards, in a fashion that was bizarre to onlookers, which helped create fear in hearts of their enemies because of their reputation.

=== Young diplomat ===
As a young man, Plenty Coups also gained a reputation for being a wise and eloquent speaker. He was often looked to for guidance and advice, and spoke out often during tribal councils regarding their neighboring enemies, and their interaction with the encroaching white population and their government.

== Last great chief ==
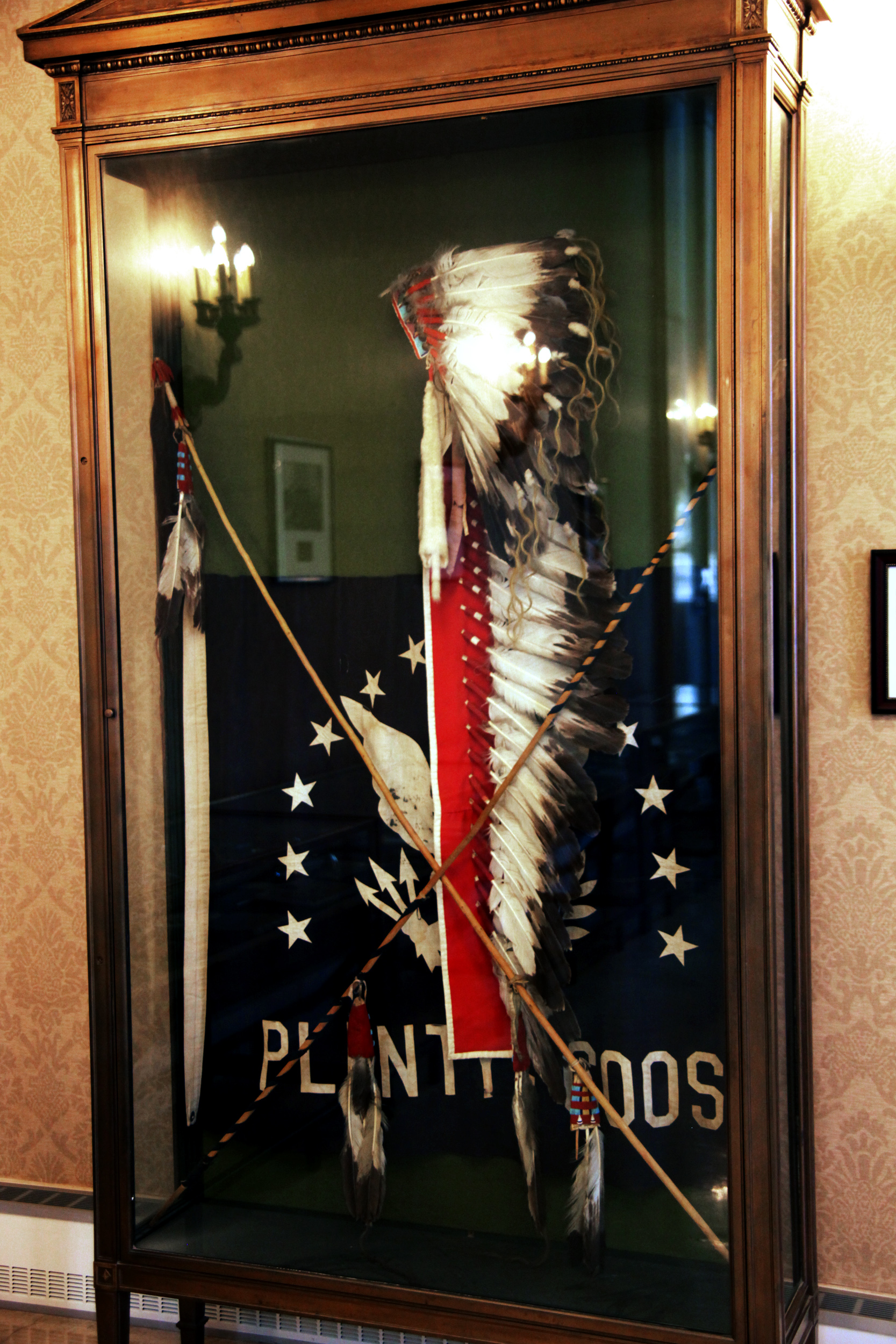
War bonnet and coup sticks used by Plenty Coups during dedication of the Tomb of the Unknown Soldier in 1921, on display at Memorial Amphitheater at Arlington National Cemetery

Plenty Coups was named a chief of the Crow at age 28. As a young man and chief, he was a fierce and well-respected warrior. He was thought to have between 50 and 100 feathers on his coup stick, each one representing an act of valor. Many times over, he had fulfilled the four requirements for becoming a chief.

=== Fighting to protect a nation ===
Plenty Coups became a chief in 1876, the same year as the Battle of the Little Bighorn. Six Crow warriors worked as scouts for General Custer at this time, and were allied with the white man in order to fight their own primary enemies during this period: the Lakota, Sioux and Cheyenne. According to the interpretation of Plenty Coups' vision, cooperating with the white man was the only way to ensure the Crow's future survival in a white man's world.

=== Speaking to protect a people ===
He was selected to represent the Crow in Washington, D.C., where he fought successfully against U.S. senators' plans to abolish the Crow nation and take away their lands. He made many trips to Washington over ten years to protect his people.

He was fairly successful in doing so, and managed to keep the Crows' original land (although it amounted to only 80% of what they were originally allotted), despite many foreigners' desire to take the land for gold prospecting and other uses. Many other Native Americans tribes were relocated to reservations on entirely different land than where they had lived their lives.

Plenty Coups told about his trip to Washington in 1880 to William Wildschut. The travel east was by Fast Wagon or train. It was described as "a big black horse with his belly nearly touching the ground".

=== Dedication of the Tomb of the Unknown Soldier ===
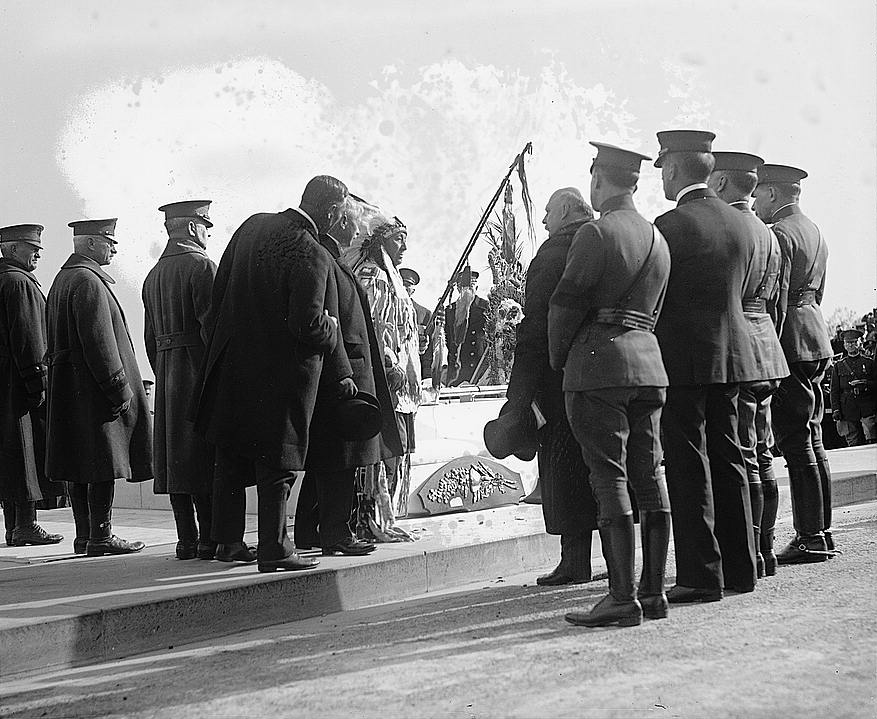
Crow Nation chief Alaxchíia Ahú ("Plenty Coups"), the only tribal representative at the burial of the Unknown Soldier of World War I at Arlington National Cemetery

Chief Plenty Coups was selected as the sole representative of Native Americans for the dedication of the Tomb Of The Unknown Soldier and gave a short speech in his native tongue in honor of the soldier and the occasion. He placed his war-bonnet and coup stick upon the tomb, and they are preserved in a display case there.

== Legacy ==
When he died in 1932 at age 84, he was considered by his people to be the last of the great chiefs. The vision he had had when he was younger had come true-he was married (his wife was Strikes-the-iron), but had no children of his own. Bison were almost wholly replaced by cattle. White society and government dominated and had completely changed America. Through diplomacy, foresight and strong leadership, Plenty Coups was able to preserve the Crow Nation land, people and culture much better than most other Native American tribes.

=== Autobiography ===
Author Frank Bird Linderman wrote an autobiography with Chief Plenty Coups when Plenty Coups was 80 years old. Linderman would visit Plenty Coups at his home on the Crow Reservation and ask the chief to recount parts of his life story. Two Crow Indians, Coyote-runs and Braided-scalp-lock (aka Frank Shively), assisted Plenty Coups in recounting his life to Linderman. He told about vision quests, fights with the Cheyennes and the Lakotas and about the history of the Crows. He told what little he knew about the Tongue River massacre on a big Crow camp at Tongue River in 1820. The resulting book of Plenty Coup's life was published as American: The Life Story of a Great Indian: Plenty-coups, Chief of the Crows (New York: John Day, 1930). In 1962, it was reprinted as simply Plenty-Coups: Chief of the Crows (Bison Books) and is still in print under that title.

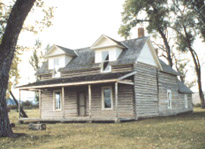
Plenty Coups Home NPS (1997)

=== Chief Plenty Coups State Park and Home ===
Inspired by a visit to George Washington's Mount Vernon plantation in Virginia in 1928, four years before his death Chief Plenty Coups donated 195 acres (0.79 km^{2}) of his personal land to Big Horn County to create a park for future generations to enjoy. The log cabin he lived in is there and is part of Chief Plenty Coups State Park. He is buried here and park visitors may visit his grave, along with a visitor center and museum that has more information about Plenty Coups and his legacy. The whole park was renovated in 2003. The park is located near Pryor, Montana.

== Quotations ==
- "Education is your most powerful weapon. With education, you are the white man's equal; without education, you are his victim, and so shall remain all your lives."
- "The ground on which we stand is sacred ground. It is the blood of our ancestors."
- "I hear the white men say there will be no more war. But this cannot be true. There will be other wars. Men have not changed, and whenever they quarrel they will fight, as they have always done."

== Bibliography ==
- McDannell, Colleen. Religions of the United States in Practice. Princeton, N.J.: Princeton University Press, 2002.
- Melton, J. Gordon. Religious Leaders of America: A Biographical Guide to Founders and Leaders of Religious Bodies, Churches, and Spiritual Groups in North America. Detroit, Mich.: Gale Research, 1999.
- Plenty Coups and Linderman, Frank Bird. Plenty-Coups, Chief of the Crows. Reprint ed. Lincoln, Neb.: University of Nebraska Press, 2002. ISBN 0803280181

== Film ==
- Native Spirit and the Sun Dance Way, DVD documentary about the preservation of the Crow Sun Dance religion with quotes from Plenty Coups, 2007, World Wisdom
