= Little People of the Pryor Mountains =

Race of ferocious dwarfs in the folklore of the Crow Nation

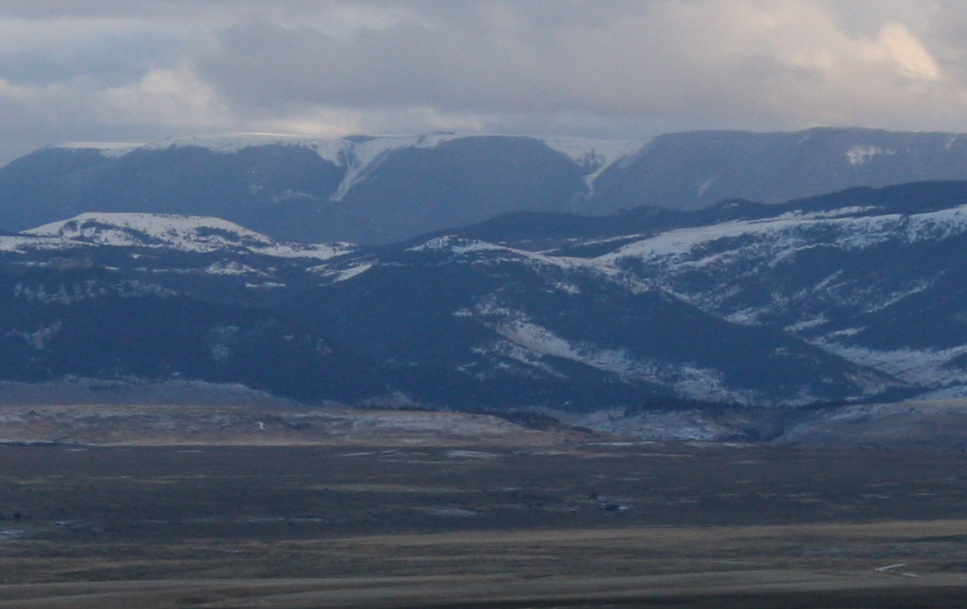
The Pryor Mountains

The Little People of the Pryor Mountains (known as Nirumbee or Awwakkulé in the Crow language) are a race of ferocious dwarfs in the folklore of the Crow Tribe, a Native American tribe. The Little People were also seen as imparting spiritual wisdom, and played a major role in shaping the destiny of the Crow People through the dreams of the iconic Crow chief, Plenty Coups.

== Native American beliefs in "Little People" ==
Stories and religious beliefs about "Little People" are common to many, if not most Native American tribes in the West. Some tribes (such as the Umatilla of Oregon) referred to them as the "Stick Indians," while the Nez Perce called them Itśte-ya-ha.

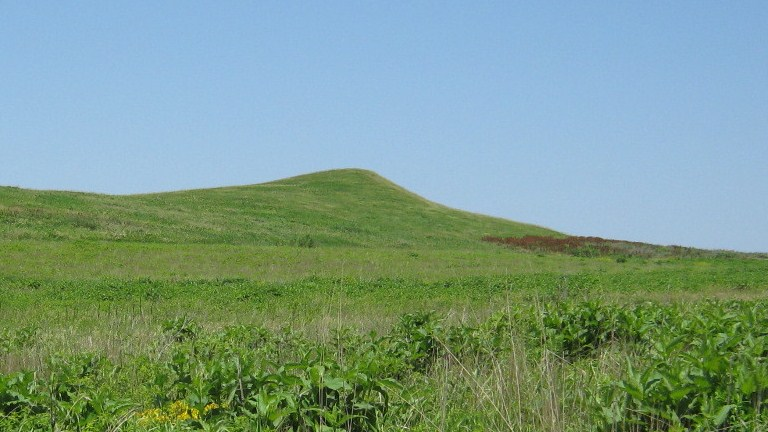
Spirit Mound, reportedly home of some Little People. It is located within Spirit Mound Historic Prairie in South Dakota.

In 1804, the Lewis and Clark Expedition stayed for a time with a band of Wičhíyena Sioux on the Vermillion River in modern-day South Dakota. On August 25, Meriwether Lewis, William Clark, and 10 other men traveled about 9 miles (14 km) north of the river's junction with the Missouri River to see the "mountain of the Little People". Lewis wrote in his journal that the Little People were "deavals" (devils) with very large heads, about 18 inches (46 cm) high, and very alert to any intrusions into their territory. The Sioux said that the devils carried sharp arrows which could strike at a very long distance, and that they killed anyone who approached their mound. The Little People so terrified the local population, Lewis reported, that the Maha (Omaha), Ottoes (Otoe), and Sioux would not go near the place. The Lakota people who came to live near the "Spirit Mound" after the Wičhíyena Sioux have a story no more than 250 years old which describes how a band of 350 warriors came near the mound late at night and were nearly wiped out by the ferocious Little People (the survivors were crippled for life).

The Crow (or Absaroke) were originally part of the Hidatsa people who lived a settled, agricultural life along the Missouri River in what is now western North Dakota. Some time prior to the mid-17th century, the Hidatsa leader No-Vitals led a large number of Hidatsa west into the Yellowstone River valley of south-central Montana, where the tribe lived on the plains, by the river, and in the nearby Big Horn, Pryor, and Wolf Mountains. On the move due to pressure from eastern and midwestern tribes moving west due to white encroachment, the Crow may have settled in the Yellowstone Valley only a few decades before the arrival of Lewis and Clark. A fundamental tenet of Crow religion was maxpe, or "the sacred."

== The Little People of the Pryor Mountains ==
Crow folklore says the "Little People" live in the Pryor Mountains, a small mountain range in Carbon County, Montana and Bighorn County, Montana. Petroglyphs on rocks in the mountains, the Crow said, were made by these demon-like creatures. Because the Little People live there, the mountains are sacred to the Crow. The Little People are said to be no more than 18 inches (46 cm) (or knee) high. Crow folklore differs slightly from that of other tribes in describing the Little People of the Pryor Mountains as having large heads, nearly fourteen inches tall, and incredibly strong but short arms and legs; and little or no neck. In the story of "Lost Boy", the Crow told of a Little Person who killed a full-grown bull elk and carried it off just by tossing the elk's head over its shoulder. The Crow expression, "strong as a dwarf," references the incredible strength of these Little People. However, they are incredibly fierce warriors, feed primarily on meat, and have many sharp, canine-like teeth in their mouths. Nearby tribes told stories of the Little People tearing the hearts out of their enemies' horses, stories which may have helped keep these tribes from making war on the Crow. Each year, the Crow made an offering to the Little People at Medicine Rocks (also known as "Castle Rocks"), where they believed some Little People lived. The Pryor Mountains Little People were also known for stealing children, food, medicine, and tobacco. The Crow also believed that the Little People created stone arrowheads, for the Crow themselves only knew how to make bone arrowheads. Anyone who tried to play a trick on the Little People would incur their wrath, which usually destroyed him and his entire family.

The Little People (sometimes referred to as "spirit dwarves") were also said to be able to confer blessings or spiritual insight (maxpe) to certain individuals. Generally speaking, the Crow would refuse to enter the Pryor Mountains due to their belief in the Little People. However, on occasion a lone Crow would travel to the Medicine Rocks and fast, where one of the Little People might manifest as a lone animal to teach the seeker these insights. The Crow tell of two ways to pass through the mountains without being harmed by the Little People, however. Both involved offerings. According to their folklore, the Little People had befriended a young Crow boy. The boy told the Crow that there was a pass through the mountains which the Crow could use, but they would need to shoot arrows ahead of them as they traveled as an offering to the Little People. This pass, now called Pryor Gap, was known to the Crow as "Hits With The Arrows." The Crow name for Pryor Creek was "Arrow Creek," and the Pryor Mountains were known to them as the Baahpuuo or "Arrowhead Mountains." However, other kinds of offerings, such as beads, cloth, or tobacco, could also be left in order to win safe passage through the mountains.

The Little People also were integral to the Crow practice of the Sun Dance. The Little People were said to be "owners" of any Sun Dance lodge that was built. The Little People judge who among the participants is truly sincere, and confer only on them any visions or spiritual insight. A dancer's position in the Sun Dance could only be awarded by the Little People.

=== Role of Little People in the dreams of Plenty Coups ===
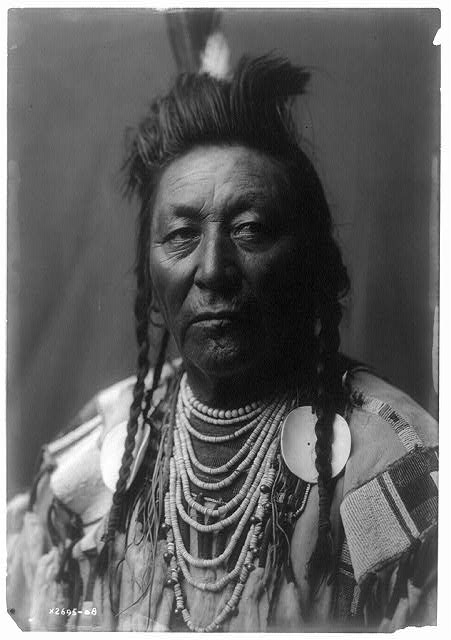
Plenty Coups in 1908

One of the most famous Crow leaders to encounter the Little People was the legendary Crow chief Plenty Coups (Aleek-chea-ahoosh). When he was nine years old, Plenty Coup's older brother (who was a great warrior and quite handsome, and whom Plenty Coups loved deeply) was killed by raiding Lakotas. Although the tribe was preparing to move out, Plenty Coups fasted for four days, used the sweat lodge, rubbed his body with sage and cedar to remove any smell, and then went into the nearby hills where he had a vision. In his vision, the chief of the Little People took him into a spirit-world lodge, where Plenty Coups saw representations of nature (the wind, the stars, thunder, the Moon, bad storms, etc.). The dwarf chief demanded that Plenty Coups count coup, but since Plenty Coups was just nine years of age he knew that he had no great deeds to count. Nonetheless, the chief of the Little People recounted two great deeds to the spirits gathered in the lodge, and said that Plenty Coups would not only accomplish these deeds but many others as well. He also prophesied that Plenty Coups would become chief of his people, if he used his wits, and then advised Plenty Coups to develop his willpower so that he could lead his people. "I had a will and I would use it, make it work for me, as the Dwarf-chief had advised. I became very happy, lying there looking up into the sky. My heart began to sing like a bird, and I went back to the village, needing no man to tell me the meaning of my dream. I took a sweat-bath and rested in my father's lodge. I knew myself now."

When he was 11 years old, Plenty Coups had a second vision involving the Little People, one that changed the fate of his entire tribe. Plenty Coups' family had moved to be with other bands of Crow lodging in the Beartooth Mountains. All the young men were challenged to go into the hills to seek visions, and Plenty Coups did so. Plenty Coups walked for two days (fasting as he went) and entered the Crazy Mountains, but had no vision. He returned a few days later with three friends, fasted, and took sweat-baths. He decided to cut off the tip of his left index finger as an offering to the spirits. That night, he dreamt of the chief of the Little People again. The chief introduced Plenty Coups to a buffalo that turned into a man with buffalo-like features (the buffalo-man), who led him underground and down a tunnel or path toward the Pryor Mountains. For two days, he traveled underground among throngs of American bison. Finally, the buffalo-man showed Plenty Coups a vision of endless streams of bison coming out of a hole in the ground but disappearing. Then a second stream of bison—with different colors (even spots), tails, and sounds—came up out of the ground, and remained on the plains. Plenty Coups had a vision of himself as an old man lodged near the Medicine Rocks, and of a vast forest whose trees had been felled by a great wind. Only a chickadee remained. A voice told Plenty Coups that the day of the Plains Indian was ending, and that white men would swarm over the land like buffalo. But the chickadee remains, because it is a good listener, develops its mind, and survives by its wits.

Plenty Coups sought out the advice of his tribal elders in interpreting this dream. They said that it meant that the buffalo would soon disappear, to be replaced by white men's cattle. But the Crow people would survive the coming tide of white people if the people developed their listening skills and minds, and they would inherit the land seen from the Medicine Rocks. The Crow Nation (guided by this vision) did survive, and today the Crow Indian Reservation is only a short distance from the Pryor Mountains and Medicine Rocks. As one historian of religious belief has said, "[I]ndeed, the Crow people survived the deepest crisis of the nineteenth century in part because of Plenty-coup's vision." The site where Plenty Coups emerged from the underground world and had his vision is now Chief Plenty Coups State Park in Montana.

== In story ==
One Crow Nation folktale involves the "Lost Boy" or "Burnt Face," and the Little People figure prominently in it. After a young boy falls into a bonfire, his face is left horribly scarred. He receives the name Burnt Face because of this accident. One day, his people move north on their regular journeys following the buffalo, but Burnt Face goes south. He builds a Sun Dance lodge, and the Little People come out to talk to him. The Little People take away his scars, show him where his band has gone to, and give him healing powers to help his people. Burnt Face retained his name, but became a great chief among his people.

In another story, the Crow tells of a child who fell out of his travois as his family moved to new hunting grounds. The Little People adopted the boy and raised him in a cave in the Pryor Mountains. The boy absorbed part of their magic, and grew to become supernaturally strong. He began to build tall columns of stone and rocks for fun, and this is how Medicine Rocks was created.

In the story "The Little People," a hunter goes hunting in the Pryor Mountains and has little luck. He asks the Little People for guidance. A Little Person's voice tells him that he has to provide the Little People with an offering. The man shoots a deer, and then drops it over a cliff in Black Canyon as an offering to the spirits. He then has great luck in hunting. He returns home, but returns to the mountains the next day—curious to see if the dead deer is still where he left it. The deer's body is gone.

== Physical evidence alleged to be Little People ==
The physical remains of tiny people have been reported found in various locations in the western United States, particularly Montana and Wyoming (e.g. San Pedro Mountains mummy). Typically, these are described as being found in caves with various details such as descriptions that they were "perfectly formed", dwarf-size, etc. Archeologist Lawrence L. Loendorf notes that "The burials, of course, are always sent to a local university or to the Smithsonian for analysis, only to have both the specimens and research results disappear." Loendorf also suggests that the discovery of two mummies of anencephalic infants in the first half of the twentieth century with deformities that caused some people to believe they were adults has "contributed to public belief in the existence of a group of tiny prehistoric people.

As of the late 20th century, some Crow remained convinced that the Little People exist. Members of the Crow Nation passing through Pryor Gap sometimes still leave offerings for the Little People. Members of the modern Crow Nation say they have even encountered them while hunting in the Pryor Mountains. Others, taking a wrong road or footpath, say they have seen them blocking the road, and Little People are claimed to have even healed some sick people.
