= Crow religion =

Indigenous religion of the Crow people

Crow religion is the indigenous religion of the Crow people, Native Americans of the Great Plains area of the United States.

== The Crow Deity ==
In the Crow language the Creator has many names, such as Akbaatatdia (One Who Has Made Everything/Maker of All Things Above), Iichíkbaalee (First Doer/Maker), and Isáahkawuattee (Old Man Coyote). All names refer to a singular, omnipotent god who the Crow believe to have created the universe. This universe is believed to be made up of three worlds, the first is the physical world, thought to be the smallest of all the worlds, the second is the spirit world, and the third is where God alone lives.

== Crow creation stories ==
One of many Crow creation stories for the physical world recalls that Old Man Coyote (OMC) was alone in a large ocean when he saw two male ducks floating upon its surface. In conversation with the ducks the subject turns to what lies beneath the sea. Old Man Coyote encourages one of the ducks to dive, which he does, and after a nervous wait the duck finally surfaces with a root in its beak. Another dangerous dive brings up mud. With this soil Old Man Coyote builds first an island, and then all the lands of the Earth. However the Earth is empty, so Old Man Coyote uses the root to populate the planet with plants and trees. Despite this success the Earth was still not right, it was too flat, so OMC shaped the land to create the rivers, mountains and all geographical features. Again something was missing, Old Man Coyote and the ducks wanted friends, so he moulded Man out of the clay. But Old Man Coyote wanted Man to be happy so he created Women too so that they may be contented together and multiply. He then made female ducks so that ducks may be happy too. The story then develops where Old Man Coyote encounters another Coyote, and they decide to travel together, getting themselves into various situations that eventually creates all animals of the Earth.

In the beginning it is believed that Crows were close to God, praying constantly to show their devotion, however as time progressed Crows forgot to pray and brought misfortune upon themselves. Crows believe that they must rekindle that bond through prayer if they are to be prosperous, many seeking a personal relationship with God to be individually successful.

== Crow religious belief ==
Crows will often use 'Grandmother Earth' as a way of expressing the physical things that God created, as God, although part of the physical world, transcends the first world. Because of this God is often referred to hierarchically as being 'Above,' as in superior, rather than physically in the heavens. As God created everything Crows believe that the power of the Creator is in all things, and therefore, all things in nature are sacred. As God created everything and is therefore omnipresent, Crows are in contact with God during every aspect of their daily lives. It is because of this omnipresence and omnipotence that Crows are religiously tolerant. One example of this tolerance is the overview of the world's religions provided by Thomas Yellowtail, a Crow medicine man and Sun Dance chief. Yellowtail used the metaphor of a wagon wheel to describe religious belief, noting that, each spoke represented a unique people and religion. If one spoke was removed, the wheel would not work, meaning all spokes must be present to form the circle of life. All spokes however are connected to the central beam, the Creator. Therefore, all religions and peoples are connected to God, and all equally valid as ways of establishing a spiritual relationship. As a result, Crows can participate in multiple religions, it is up to individuals to decide which methods they believe to be most effective. What is now considered traditional Crow religious practices were most likely developed sometime between 1725–1770, at a time of great cultural change after the Crow acquired their first horses from the Comanche tribe during the 1730s.

== Baaxpée, Xapáaliia and spirits ==
The sacred power of God is called Baaxpée, meaning "power transcending the ordinary." The physical manifestation of Baaxpée is called Xapáaliia, often referred to as 'medicine,' which represents and acts as a conduit of Baaxpée given to a Crow by God.

For a Crow to acquire Baaxpée they must be given it by a spirit, a Iilápxe, a super-natural patron from the spirit world. As the spirit world is between the physical and the third world where God dwells, spirits are believed to be intermediaries between man and God and are therefore able to bestow Baaxpée. Crows believe that the world is full of spirits which often take the form of animals, with buffalos, birds and bears being especially revered. The stars, as created by God, are also considered highly sacred and their spirits can interact with humans in the same way as an animal patron. The manifestation of the spirit often defines the type of Baaxpée they gift, with an Elk spirit, as a strong and independent animal being associated with bestowing increased strength. A squirrel spirit, as it stores nuts for the winter to feed its family, is believed to do the same for humans, helping the tribe find food. The individual features of each spirit will also influence the type of Baaxpée given, for example a grey haired patron will indicate a gift of longevity. However, there is no set animal patron and Baaxpée for a Crow, each spirit is individual the person that received its vision.

== Vision quests ==
According to the Crows, in the pre-reservation world, there were two primary ways that a Crow may go about acquiring Baaxpée, the first is by going on a vision quest. There are many reasons why a Crow would want to attain Baaxpée through a vision quest, some may be sick and wish to be cured, others may want to gain strength with which to defeat their enemies in battle, and many want to be blessed by God to guide them throughout their life. Generally the Baaxpée a Crow wishes to attain through a vision quest is personal and specific to the individual.

Before embarking upon the quest a Crow might visit a medicine man to help determine what type of Baaxpée would most aid them, and to go over the rites and prayers to ensure their endeavour follows the rituals. For the quest itself, a Crow will go alone to an isolated and prominent place, often the peak of a hill (Crows especially favour the Wolf Mountains), to gain complete solitude for their ritual prayer.

In Crow the ritual is called bilisshíissanne, which translates as 'to fast from water,' as the participant vows not eat or drink for two to three days to show their devotion to God through their sacrifice. Self-mortification is also sometimes practiced, the most common being the removal of a finger, as an offering to God and as sign of their dedication. The purpose of these tortures is to show their willingness to give themselves completely to God and gain the pity of a spirit, a representative of God. When a spirit pities the participant they will induce a vision in which the patron adopts the Crow, bestowing Baaxpée. The relationship between the spirit and a Crow is conceived as being paternal, where the spirit as a father guides the Crow child through life, hence spirits will often be referred to as 'Medicine Fathers.' However the Baaxpée the quester gains is loaned by the spirit, not given entirely, requiring the Crow to pray to their patron to confirm the bonds between them and keep the Baaxpée strong.

Once the quest is complete and Baaxpée gained, the Crow quester would return home, often visiting a medicine man to talk through their vision to fully understand its meaning. To commemorate their experience the quester will create a Xapáaliia to represent their patron, the power they have gained, and to help a Crow in channelling and maintaining their Baaxpée. For the individual the Xapáaliia can be anything they deem sufficient to represent the bond between them and their patron, for example if an eagle was their spirit a Crow may decide to take an eagle's feather as their Xapáaliia. For each Crow their Baaxpée and their vision is unique and cannot be transferred. However the Xapáaliia is a physical, powerful, and sacred object which can be passed between Crows, often bestowed upon death to family members, or given to Crows who cannot receive a vision of their own. If a Crow's Xapáaliia is known to be especially powerful, proven by its ability to influence life, they may find themselves inundated with requests to use it, the decision however it is ultimately up the owner as to who they give it to. The powers that Xapáaliia bestows to its owner usually reflect the pragmatic concerns of a Crow's daily life, whether this be to gain food, good health, wealth or to bring victory over one's enemies. To keep their Xapáaliia pure and their patron happy, it is vital that it does not come into contact with menstruates, if it does, this would offend their Medicine Father and bring disease upon the owner.

== The Sun Dance ==
The second way in which nineteenth century Crows may attempted to gain Baaxpée was through a Sun Dance (aškišširissu-a). Unlike the vision quest the Sun Dance is performed by individuals in a public ceremony for the benefit of the whole tribe, performed to ensure the Crow's links to God remain strong, therefore bringing prosperity and happiness. Leslie Spear believed that the Sun Dance ceremony most likely came from the Cheyenne, Blackfeet and Atsina tribes as these groups had the most complex Sun Dance ceremonies. The Sun Dance was banned on the Crow reservation in 1887 as part of the 'civilising' effort that the Indian Office embarked upon during this era. The practise was revived in 1941 when William Big Day, after having attended a Shoshone Sun Dance where he felt an intense connection, performed the first Crow Sun Dance in fifty-four years, believing that its resurrection would bring happiness to the tribe. The practice grew so that by the 1990s an average of five Sun Dances were conducted each summer. In the late 1980s a Teton-Sioux version of Sun Dance was introduced to the reservation, resulting in some dances displaying a hybrid of Shoshone and Teton characteristics.

=== The Sweat Lodge Ceremony ===
A smaller, but no less significant ritual, celebrated both in the pre-reservation world and in contemporary Crow society, is the sweat lodge. While this ritual is practiced alone, it is also an important prerequisite to the Sun Dance that tribal members believe purifies the body and prepares the soul for the Sun Dance. This connection is seen in that the Sweat Lodge is often referred to as the 'Little Lodge,' the smaller brother of the 'Big Lodge' in which the Sun Dance is performed. The Sweat Lodge itself in many ways mimics the Big Lodge, being made of twelve poles with the door facing east to welcome the Sun. In the centre of the lodge a 2 ft by 2 ft pit is dug into which hot rocks are placed, heated by a fire to the east of the lodge. An individual is given the duty of placing the rocks in the pit whilst the others sit and pray in silence. The first four rocks must be placed in cross, each to represent the four directions of the wind and the circle of life. Once all rocks are placed the ceremony begins, first an uncounted number of dips of water are placed on the rocks called 'April Showers' to build up the sweat in the lodge. Then the formal four quarters of the ceremony are conducted, with a break in-between each quarter. During the first quarter four dips are placed upon the rocks, the second seven, the third ten, and then the fourth an uncounted 'quarter of a million.' The ceremony is believed to purify the participants, preparing them for the Sun Dance ceremony, which, seen as a form of spiritual endurance and warfare, requires a Crow to be pure to give them spiritual armour.

Although the exact origin of the Sweat Lodge is unknown, it was believed by Thomas Yellowtail to have come from the story of the Seven Bison, their male companion, and their fight against the angry bison Bones Together. In the story each of the Seven Bison charges at Bones Together, but break their legs in their attempts due to Bones Together's pure bone armour. Finally it is the turn of the bison's human ally, who before attacking Bones Together prays to God and is blessed by an eagle, who gives him the Baaxpée to turn into a feather. With this power the man confronts Bones Together, who charges four times, each time missing the man as he turns into a feather and wafts unharmed out of the way as though caught in a breeze. After the fourth charge the man shots an arrow up the rectum of Bones Together, piercing his heart and killing him. Although victorious the man's friends are grievously injured, so together they perform the Sweat Lodge ceremony, which heals all the bison to full strength. Afterwards the Seven Bison transcend into the sky to create the Big Dipper, and the man the Little Dipper. The Sweat Lodge is also mentioned in the story of the Man and the Seven Rams, who, despite his immense ability, respects the Sweat Lodge, recognising its great power.

=== The Sun Dance lodge: construction and symbolism ===
Following purification the Sun Dance ceremony can proceed. However first it is necessary to look at the building of the Big Lodge, the Ashé Isée, as this is vital if one is to understand the Dance in context and the complex symbolism involved in its construction. The Lodge acts as the closest building that the pre-reservation Crows had to a church, and is constructed by the community on land owned by the dance sponsor. The sponsor is usually an individual of repute who wishes to receive a particular blessing from God or because they have had a vision instructing them to dance. As sponsor it is their duty to gather all the materials required to build the lodge, to set the dance's overall agenda, and to ensure the dance itself is conducted properly by leading key rituals and songs.

The most important component of the lodge the central pole around which the whole ceremony revolves. A forked tree is chosen by the sponsor and cut down with respect and prayer, if the tree stump exudes sap it is seen as a good omen, and Crows will bless themselves with its excretion. The tree is then taken to the ceremonial site and hoisted into an upright position so that the crotch of the fork faces east. To one of the branches of the fork a white flag is tied, to the other blue, white to represent the earth and blue for the skies, an offering of tobacco is also attached to help Crows communicate with God. Onto the pole three rings are drawn in charcoal to symbolise the number of days in the dance and the three worlds of the Crow universe, the black of the charcoal representing victory. It is in this way that the post becomes a representation of God, a conduit for the Baaxpée to flow into the dancers. To the central pole are also hung the head of a buffalo and the body of an eagle, patrons who will come to life in the minds of the dancers during the ceremony. Around this totem are placed twelve posts of cottonwood, around forty feet from the centre, creating the boundaries of the lodge, with the doorway on the east side. The twelve poles are a physical manifestation of Crow spirituality, which when connected by rafters to the central post, represents the Crow's connection to God, like that of Thomas Yellowtail's wagon wheel. The twelve posts also represent the twelve months of the year in the Crow life cycle, and by forming a sphere, the circle of life itself. For contemporary Crows who believe both in traditional religious ideas and Christianity, the twelve posts symbolise the twelve apostles, and the three rings on the centre pole the three days that Christ spent in his tomb. It is in these way that the Sun dance lodge is designed to focus and channel the Baaxpée of God, giving the Crow participants visions and blessing for the whole tribe.

=== The Sun Dance ceremony ===
Once the lodge is constructed the ceremony can begin. Similarly to the vision quest the purpose of the Sun Dance is for a Crow to show their devotion, displaying sacrifice by fasting, and torture by constant dancing, to physically exhaust themselves whilst praying to God, in a lodge heated all day by an intense sun. Traditionally the Sun Dance's primary purpose was to give a mourner God's blessing to take revenge on the tribe that had killed their kinsman, and specifically to enable the participant to harm those individuals responsible for their murder. However, with imposed peace of the reservations the purpose of the ritual had to change, instead there are a variety of reasons for performing a Sun Dance including season renewal, to gain God's blessing, and in rare cases to attain sacred power to help Crows going to war. Although the general aim of a particular Sun Dance may be to bring good luck on the tribe each dancer had their own personal agenda for participating. Some may have wish to receive Baaxpée through dance induced visions whilst others may have wished to cure illnesses, either for themselves or on behalf of a sick family member. Regardless of their motivation all dancers before the ceremony pledge themselves to Sun Dance manikin, promising to dance for the full length of time that has been announced.

During the ceremony the participant made sure to keep their eyes transfixed upon an idol on the pole, as a Crow continuously danced, becoming increasingly fatigued, the figures appear to come alive and dance with them, eventually causing the dancer to collapse and have a vision. If the dancer stared at the head of the Buffalo and danced long enough for the spirit to come alive, it is believed that the patron charged the participant, causing the Crow to have a 'hard fall,' inducing a vision. When a dancer collapsed and entered into a visionary state, other members of the tribe carefully removed them from the ceremony centre, allowing their vision to run its course. When the dancer woke up, they are reinvigorated and quickly re-joined the ritual. To help the dancers attain these visions the drummers play a vital role. Regular rhythms help the dancer to maintain their endeavour, with irregular beatings exhausting the participants. When the drummers see a dancer in the grips of a vision they will increase the strength of their drumming to help them have a 'hard fall.' The Drum chief will often pray for the dancers with the aid of tobacco smoke to help them endure their sacrifice.

While in the nineteenth century, the Sun Dance could extend for several days, today it typically lasts for three days. At the start of each day Crows gathered in the lodge just before dawn facing east to welcome the morning's sun. When the first rays appeared over the horizon Crows performed the Sunrise Ceremony, where the participants of the Sun Dance attempted to absorb the power of the sun whilst praying, dancing, blowing on eagle bone whistles, and singing the Sunrise song. During the Sunrise ceremony it is taboo to walk across the entrance of the lodge as this breaks the connection between the dancers and the sun, if an individual has to move from one side of the lodge to the other the must walk around the rear of the building. For the first day of dancing participants dressed humbly in plain clothing to show their humility to God, on the second day however, as the dancers become increasingly tired, bright coloured clothes, face paint, and their strongest medicines were worn to help them in their spiritual warfare. To aid them through this difficult second day, and in recognition of their sacrifice, members of the tribe offered gifts and words of advice, as well as constructed willow structures in the lodge to shade and support the dancers. Willow is significant as it is associated with coolness, providing symbolic relief for the parched participants. The stalls were often painted in yellow ochre, a colour associated with the eagle which Crows believe to be a messenger to God. It was at noon on the third day that the ceremony typically came to an end, with the breaking of the fast by the drinking of blessed water brought by the women of the tribe. After drinking, prayers were said to thank the dancers for their sacrifice and the whole tribe participated in a great feast. By renewing their connection with God the Sun Dance is believed to bestow God's blessing upon the tribe, bringing them good fortune and happiness for the coming year.

Before the Sun Dance was banned some Crows performed a particular type of self-mortification. Holes would be punctured into the pectoral muscles of the dancers through which rawhide rope would be laced and attached to the pole, the participant would then lean backwards, tightening the rope against their flesh in an act of self-torture. Freedom would only come when the rope had worked its way through the dancer's skin, showing their devotion to God. With the revival of the Sun Dance however this particular practice was not included, and yet it remains one of the enduring images of the Sun Dance to this day.

== Diakaashe, 'he really did it' ==
Both in the past and the present, performing these rituals without the correct religious attitude would prevent the participant from having any benefit. The greatest gift to God is to do each ceremony with diakaashe, 'he really did it,' that a Crow believed wholeheartedly in God's power, and therefore conducted themselves with sincerity and determination. "If a person expects to receive something great, then that person will probably never receive anything. The Medicine Fathers do not owe anything to anyone. We must realise this and dedicate our lives to living in accordance with the directions given to us from Above – not just once a year, but every day and year after year."

== Tobacco ==
Tobacco is also an important component of Crow religion, the plant being honoured in a Crow sect called the Tobacco Society, the Bacu'sua. Crows believe that tobacco was first discovered by Chief No Vitals at Devils Lake in eastern North Dakota, having been instructed to seek the plant by God, the worship of which would help Crows honour God. Because of this tobacco is perceived as being fundamental to the welfare of the tribe and has been describe by Crows themselves as their 'means of living.' As the plant is especially revered, the Tobacco Society ensures that all the rites and rituals are performed correctly, cultivating it so that the tribe may be successful. When the sacred plant is smoked it is believed that the smoke aids in carrying prayers to God.

For those Crow who consider smoking especially holy there is the Sacred Pipe Society. In this society smoking is performed daily allowing is members to become closer to God. Once the pipe is lit the stem is pointed above as an offering to God, then down to Mother Earth, and finally in all four of the directions of the wind. When the prayers are over the pipe is returned to its special place in the tipi. Thomas Yellowtail was a proponent of this method of honouring God as he believed it was a way praying as part of a Crow's daily life, which he consider especially important if God is to be properly respected. Yellowtail used Black Elk's description of the sacred pipe to demonstrate what he believed to be the importance of sacred pipe to Crows. "With this sacred pipe you will walk upon the Earth; for the Earth is your Grandmother and Mother, and she is sacred. Every step that has been taken upon Her should be as a prayer. The bowl of this pipe is of red stone; it is the Earth... The stem of this pipe is of wood, and this represents all that grows upon Earth... all things of the universe are joined to you who smokes the pipe – all send their voices to Wakan-Tanka, the Great Spirit. When you pray with this pipe, you pray for and with everything."

== Christianity ==
Today Crow religion includes more than traditional Crow beliefs. Over the past 100 years, several Christian sects have established themselves amongst the Crow people. The origins of Christianity among the Crows can be traced to the reservation era, when the Crow were confined to a relatively small tract and carefully supervised by white missionaries and government agents. The first and initially most successful Christian denomination were Catholic Jesuits, who established the St. Xavier mission in the Bighorn Valley in 1887 under the leadership of Pierpaolo Prando, after the Catholics had itinerantly preached to the Crow for seven years. Prando was respected by Crows for his determination to learn their language, which allowed him to have conversations with them and enabled him to translate sermons into Crow so that they could understand the Christian God. In October 1888 the Jesuits consolidated their mission with the building of a school, which further brought Crows round to their denomination. Key to the Catholics success was their ability to deal with Crows on their own terms, that the missionaries respected traditional Crow beliefs, even allowing Crow converts to make Christian Xapáaliia.

The Protestants were in the beginning less successful in converting Crows to Christianity. Although supported by the Indian Office in the belief that Protestantism would 'elevate' Crows, the first Unitarian mission established at the Little Bighorn in 1886 by Henry F. Bond failed to win support from the Crow community. Bond practiced a strict form of Protestantism, and therefore refused to acknowledge traditional Crow beliefs and culture, thereby alienating the tribe. The America Missionary Association's mission established in 1895 under James Gregor Burgess also suffered a similar fate. Success came in 1903 however when a Baptist mission was built at Lodge Grass, and a school constructed in 1904 under the leadership of Rev. William A. Petzoldt. This school proved especially popular as it was located in the heart of the Crow community, enabling students to study but stay at home, something which the far away boarding schools of the other Christian missions did not allow. This mission at Lodge Grass proved so successful that the Jesuits, weakened by the withdrawal of the Indian Office's funding to their mission in 1895, established a school there as well.

Although these Christian groups met success in converting Crows they found it far harder to get their converts to worship the Christian God exclusively. This resistance was because of the Crow belief system, that Christianity was considered one of many ways to establish a relationship with God, allowing traditional Crow beliefs to coexist with Christian practices. This Crow reluctance was made all the more frustrating for the Christian missionaries with a Crow cultural and religious revival at the turn of the century, pushing what they saw as 'primitive' religion to the fore. The only successful Christians sect to get Crows to worship only God was Evangelicalism, which in the 1980s experienced a religious boom, establishing churches in districts throughout the reservations. Members of these churches rejected any form of traditional Crow religion, however this was the exception rather than the rule.

== Peyote and the Native American Church ==
Part of a wider spiritual reawakening was the growth of the peyote religion which reached the Crow reservation in 1910. Peyote ceremonies involve the consumption of the dried tips of the peyote Cactus, native to northern Mexico and the far south of the United States. Once eaten the peyote creates feelings of euphoria, visual distortions and a sense of timelessness. The use of peyote in ceremonies originates in pre-Columbian Mexico, with Seventeenth Century accounts by Catholic missionaries recording its use in all night ceremonies by the native peoples of that region. Traditionally peyote is taken for many reasons, some being the desire for longevity and good health, to purify the body and soul, as well as to bring good luck and protection from harm. Although still debated by academics it is believed that peyote ceremonies were brought to the US by the nomadic Apache and Comanche Native Americans who would often travel south of the border to raid and graze their horses. It was the concentration of these native peoples into the reservations of Oklahoma that allowed this indigenous practice to endure and grow. For the first time many tribes were living in proximity, able to communicate with each other as they were forced to learn English to deal with the Indian Office. The US government then further helped peyote rituals by sending Native Americans to boarding schools. The schools were a melting pot of Native tribes, with students sharing their knowledge of the peyote ceremonies. These youths would then go on to be educated and influential members of their tribes, putting them in positions that would allow them to promulgate the use of peyote in their communities. The use of peyote spread so rapidly on the reservations of Oklahoma because it was an element of indigenous culture that had not yet been destroyed by whites, providing Native Americans with an invaluable link with their past.

In 1918 peyote practitioners, facing a government crackdown, organised themselves into the Native American Church, hoping that as a formal organisation the US would be forced to recognize peyote as a legitimate religion. In the Church, members consume peyote and then sing and pray to God throughout the night. The Comanche chief Quanah Parker commented on the difference between the Native American Church and mainstream Christianity, remarking that, "The White man goes into his church house and talks about Jesus, but the Indian goes into his tipi and talks to Jesus."

The Indian Office, believing peyote to be addictive and harmful to 'civilisation', banned the plant's sale in Montana in 1923. When it was found that Crows were driving to Wyoming to get the cactus, a ban on peyote was enacted there in 1929. However, due to the campaigning of Bird Above, who showed that peyote fostered virtue by encouraging monogamy, hard work and temperance, at a time when tests showed the plant not to be addictive, had the ban repealed. The peyote religion proved popular, with despairing missionaries commenting in the 1930s that most of their members would attend Christian sermons and yet practice peyote beliefs.[64] At the turn of the millennium it is believed that around one hundred peyote ceremonies are performed on the Crow reservation each year. Other Native-Christian religions are practiced among the Crow, including a Native form of Pentecostalism which was initially introduced on the reservation by Crow believers in the 1920s, but today has many adherents.

== Medicine and healing ==
The medicine people of the tribe are known as Akbaalia ("healer").

== Mannegishi ==
The Mannegishi, also called little people, are bald humanoids with large bulky, pretty eyes and tiny, tan bodies. They were tricksters and may be similar to fairies.
