= San Pedro Mountains mummy =

Preserved body found in Wyoming, United States

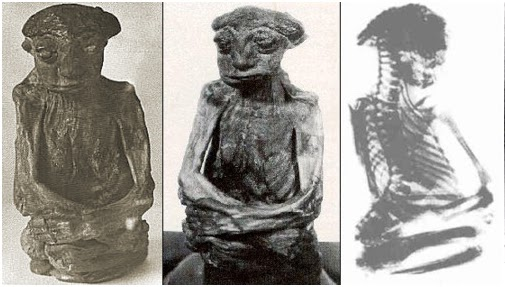
- Photographs and X-ray of the mummy
- Other name: Pedro
- Known for: Naturally mummified infant identified as having anencephaly, discovered in the San Pedro Mountains, Wyoming, in 1932 or 1934 and subsequently lost

The San Pedro Mountains mummy (known informally as "Pedro") is a mummy discovered in Wyoming in the 1930s and since lost. Scientific analyses have concluded that it is the mummy of a Native American infant that was born with anencephaly, but its small size and unusual physical features led to theories that it was an early hominid or that it was related to legends of little people. A similar mummy that was studied in the 1990s has been nicknamed "Chiquita".

== Discovery and description ==
The mummy that became known as Pedro was discovered in either 1932 or 1934 in the San Pedro mountains in Carbon County, Wyoming by two gold prospectors, Cecil Mayne and Frank Carr. After blasting open a cave, on a ledge inside it they discovered a mummified body in a seated position, approximately 6–7 inches (15–18 cm) tall, weighing approximately 1 pound (450 g). Its standing height was estimated at 17 inches (43 cm). The site may be within the Little Man mining claim, near Pathfinder Reservoir.

== Purchase and exhibition ==
In 1936, Mayne stated in a sworn affidavit that the mummy was then the property of Homer F. Sherrill and was in the Field Museum in Chicago, which has no record of it. Sherrill, a Nebraskan, exhibited it as an early hominid. It was displayed for years in the window of a drug store in Meeteetse, Wyoming. It was purchased in the 1940s by Casper car dealer Ivan Goodman, who mounted it on a wooden base and enclosed it in a domed glass jar and advertised it as a 65-year-old "pygmy", "preserved as it actually lived".

In 1950, shortly before his death, Goodman either lost it in New York or, according to a 1979 article in the Casper Star-Tribune, sold it to Leonard Wadler, who later moved to Florida and died there in the 1980s.

== Folklore and speculation ==
Following its discovery during the 1930s, the mummy attracted widespread public attention because of its unusually small size and adult-like appearance. It was widely described in newspapers as an adult "pygmy" rather than the remains of a child.

By the late 1930s and early 1940s, the mummy had become associated with Shoshone traditions describing the Nimerigar, a race of little people said to inhabit the mountains of present-day Wyoming. It was also linked to non-Indigenous folklore about "pygmy" Indians in the Rocky Mountains. These interpretations received widespread publicity, including a 1941 Milwaukee Journal article titled "Did a Race of Pygmies Once Live in America?" which presented the mummy alongside stories of the Nimerigar.

The mummy also became the subject of speculation about its origins. Newspapers, exhibitors and later writers variously described it as the remains of an adult "pygmy", an early hominid or an otherwise unknown type of human. Interest continued after the mummy disappeared in 1950. During the second half of the twentieth century, it appeared in books on unexplained phenomena and in television programmes, including a 1994 episode of Unsolved Mysteries. In 2005, John Adolfi of Granby, New York, offered a US$10,000 reward for the mummy, hoping it would provide evidence against the established account of human evolution.

== Scientific analysis ==
The mummy was examined several times during the twentieth century, although both the specimen and the original radiographs have since been lost. Early reports described features that appeared inconsistent with those of an infant, including fully formed teeth, adult-appearing vertebrae, evidence of broken bones, and traces of solid food in the stomach.

Examinations conducted during the late 1940s and 1950 concluded that the mummy was the naturally mummified remains of an infant born with anencephaly, a severe congenital condition in which much of the brain and skull fail to develop. The condition accounted for the mummy's unusually adult-like appearance, which had contributed to speculation about its identity.

The mummy was examined by physical anthropologist Harry L. Shapiro of the American Museum of Natural History, archaeologist Paul S. Martin of the Field Museum, and later by anthropologist George W. Gill of the University of Wyoming, who reviewed the surviving radiographs and agreed with the earlier diagnosis. Both the mummy and its original radiographs have since disappeared.

== Second mummy ==
In 1994, Gill was interviewed about the San Pedro mummy for an episode of the TV show Unsolved Mysteries along with Eugene Bashor, who was seeking evidence of the Nimerigar. A family in Cheyenne who saw the program then came forward with a similar mummy, 4 inches (10 cm) high, which had been purchased from a sheepherder in the same region of Wyoming around 1929 and was dubbed "Chiquita".

X-rays and DNA testing performed at Ivinson Memorial Hospital in Laramie and Denver Children's Hospital confirmed that it was a naturally mummified anencephalic female infant of Native American ancestry, and it was carbon-dated to approximately 1500 or 1700. The family then withdrew access to the mummy.

Both mummies are unique among Wyoming Native American burials in being in a seated position, with the arms wrapped around the legs. Chiquita is also unusual for a Native American in being blonde. The only other known mummy of an anencephalic infant is Egyptian.

== See also ==
- Atacama skeleton
- Alyoshenka
- Koro-pok-guru, small people in Ainu folklore
