= Nimerigar =

Race of little people in Shoshone folklore

The Nimerigar (Nemetekka in Shoshoni language) are a legendary race of little people found in the folklore of the Shoshone people of North America's Rocky Mountains.

According to Shoshone tales, the Nimerigar were an aggressive people who would shoot poisoned arrows from tiny bows. Nimerigar roughly translated from Shoshone and Paiute languages means "people eaters". They were believed to kill their own people with a blow to the head if they became too ill to be a participating member of their society.

== Archaeology ==
Although thought to be mythical, the reality of Nimerigar tales was called into question in 1932 with the discovery of the San Pedro Mountains mummy, a 14 in (36 cm)-tall mummy (6.5 in (17 cm) seated) found in a cave 60 miles south of Casper, Wyoming. Extensive tests were carried out on the mummy, with the initial belief that it was a hoax. Tests performed by the American Museum of Natural History and certified genuine by the Anthropology Department at Harvard University stated that the mummy was estimated to be the body of a full grown adult, approximately 65 years old. The mummy's damaged spine, broken collarbone, and smashed in skull (exposing brain tissue and congealed blood) suggested that it had been violently killed. Adding to its strangeness, the mummy had a full set of canine teeth, all of which were overly pointed. When examined by the University of Wyoming, the body was found to be that of a deceased anencephalic infant "whose cranial deformity gave it the appearance of a miniature adult." A second mummy examined by University of Wyoming anthropologist George Gill and the Denver Children's Hospital in the 1990s was also shown to be an anencephalic infant. DNA testing showed it to be Native American and radiocarbon dating dated it to about 1700.

== Historical accounts ==
Historical accounts from the missionary David Zeisberger in 1778 also point to the possible existence of Nimerigar or other little peoples in North America. Near Coshocton, Ohio, Zeisberger wrote of a burial ground that reportedly had numerous remains of a pygmy race, approximately 3 ft (91 cm) in height. "The long rows of graves of the pygmy race at Coshocton were regularly arranged with heads to the west, a circumstance which has given rise to the theory that these people were sun-worshippers, facing the daily approach of the sun god over the eastern hills. Acceptance of the sun-worship surmise does not necessarily imply a deduction that this pygmy race may have descended from the river-people of Hindustan or Egypt. Primeval man, wherever found, seems to have been a sun-worshipper". These burial grounds are no longer in existence as a result of extensive farming and modern inhabitation of the land. However, acceding to the missionary observations, these primitive people understood the use of the stone ax, the making of good pottery, and the division of land areas into squares. Other than this small amount of information, the story of this strange race remains untold.

== See also ==
- Caroline Crachami, a person about 19.5 in (50 cm) tall
- Dwarfs and pygmies in ancient Egypt
- Koro-pok-guru, small people in Ainu folklore
- Menehune, small race of people in Hawaiian history
- Pygmy peoples
