= History of Pryor Creek =

The history of Pryor Creek refers to the history of the region in which the city of Pryor Creek, Oklahoma, in the United States, now lies. Pryor Creek's history in the 1800s, before its official incorporation. It was initially called Coo-y-yah, in Indian Territory, but was later named Pryor Creek.

In 1951, voters approved the city's charter, giving it a mayor-council system of government. 2010, the United States Census has recorded its population as 9,539.

== 19th century ==
The Osage people were present in the northeastern region of what would become the U.S. state of Oklahoma as early as 1750. Later settlements would locate in former Osage village and campsites because the sites and the trails between them were already cleared.

In the early 1800s, treaties with the Cherokee, Osage, and Choctaw gave the tribes allotments in Indian Territory in the region that would become Oklahoma.

Captain Nathaniel Hale Pryor, who was married to an Osage woman and served as an agent to the Osage people, was among those settling northeastern Oklahoma. He established a trading post on Grand River, shortly before the establishment of Union Mission. The earliest school, church and white cemetery in present-day Oklahoma were created with the mission, which was established 5 miles southeast of present-day Chouteau in 1820.

Over a period of years, pioneers and explorers carved a trail through this section of the country that became known as the Texas or Old Military Road. It passed north and south near what is now known as U.S. Highway 69.

In 1839, the United States government forced Osage bands from Oklahoma to end hostilities between the two tribes. They would be removed from Kansas and sent back to Oklahoma in 1871.

In 1870, the Missouri-Kansas-Texas Railroad started construction in the Cherokee Nation along the Kansas border, laying tracks to Texas. By June 1871, the railroad reached the point where the present town now lies. Now known as the Union Pacific, the railroad continues to be a valuable asset to the commerce of the community and county.

A post office was eventually established naming the town Coo-y-yah, Indian Territory. Coo-y-yah is the Cherokee name for "huckleberry". On April 23, 1887, Coo-y-yah was changed to Pryor Creek, but the "Creek" was dropped by the post office on January 26, 1909. The official name of the city government is still Pryor Creek despite a proposition put before voters in 1963 to change the name.

Pryor Creek's first mayor, James Lee Mills, a Cherokee, served from 1894 to 1896. Mills was a businessman, newspaper publisher, and lawman.

== 20th century ==
In 1951, voters approved the present city charter of a mayor-council government system, which provided for the election of a mayor, clerk, treasurer, police chief and eight councilors. The charter also established a cemetery, park, library board, and a municipal utility board, which oversees operations of the city-owned gas, water, electric and sewer systems.

The Whitaker Orphan's Home was established in 1897 by W.T. and Stacy Whitaker to provide for the orphan white children of the Indian Territory. In 1908, the home became a state institution for orphans and other children in need. In 1982 the state closed down the home and turned the facility over to the Oklahoma Military Department. Under the umbrella of the Whitaker Education and Training Center, the base is home of the Thunderbird Youth Academy. Thunderbird Youth Academy conducts quasi-military program, which targets at-risk 16- to 18-year-old high school dropouts. The program teaches how to strengthen their academic performance, self-esteem, and life skills thus preparing the cadet for the work force and managing a healthy family environment.

On April 27, 1942, the city's downtown business district was destroyed by a devastating tornado which struck at 4:45 p.m. Final figures showed property damage in excess of $2,000,000, and a casualty rate of 454, with 52 deaths.

During World War II, the U.S. War Department built and the DuPont Company operated the Oklahoma Ordinance Works, an ammunition plant. A Prisoner of War Camp, mostly holding captured German soldiers, southeast of the city. The area later became the present-day Mid-America Industrial Park, which is the largest manufacturing park in the state. The industries located in the park provide jobs for hundreds of families that live in and around Mayes County. The park was selected as the site for a new 1,500,000-square-foot (140,000 m^{2}), $180 million Gatorade plant owned by PepsiCo, which has now since closed. Other long established employers include Red Devil, NGC Paper, Georgia-Pacific, Solae, Lone Star Cement, Elkem Metals, Orchid Paper and the Grand River Dam Authority, who also operates a coal-fired and natural gas power generation facility.

Pryor and Mayes County is also home to a large agricultural economy which consists of cash crops, beef cattle industry, horse industry and dairy industry. Until recently, Mayes County was the second largest dairy producing county in the state.

In 1991, Lucy Schultz was elected as the city's 31st mayor, becoming the first and only mayor of Pryor Creek.

== Tornado ==
On April 27, 1942, a tornado swept along Pryor Creek's main street from the western edge of the business district to the eastern edge of the city, destroying nearly every building and causing extensive damage to the residential section.

The storm killed 52 people, according to the U.S. Weather Bureau, but The Associated Press set the total at 60 two days after the storm. More than 400 were injured in the storm that caused damage estimated at US$2 million.

The F4 tornado struck about 5 p.m. (17:00) local time, an hour and a half after one hit near Talala, Oklahoma, and mowed a path about 5 miles (8 km) long, killing three and injuring 12. Talala, which was not hit, is about 30 miles (48 km) northwest of Pryor Creek.

Both of Pryor Creek's hospitals were wrecked by the storm, the city's water supply was disrupted, and there was no electrical or telephone service. Residential areas also suffered extensive damage.

Governor Leon C. Phillips put the area under martial law, but because the Oklahoma National Guard had been activated for service during World War II, he sent state troopers to rescue victims, maintain order and prevent looting.

The troopers were assisted by soldiers stationed at the Oklahoma Ordnance Works south of the city and by employees of duPont Co. that was to operate the gunpowder plant at the OOW. Ambulances were on the scene from Tulsa, Muskogee, Vinita, Claremore, Wagoner, and Siloam Springs, Arkansas.

Water was trucked in from Vinita and from the Oklahoma Ordnance Works. Tulsa doctors interrupted their weekly meeting, and a team of 20 went to Pryor to care for victims. Others went to the Tulsa hospitals to treat any victims sent there.

A shuttle train that transported workers between Muskogee and the Ordnance Works site was pressed into service to transport injured victims to Vinita, Oklahoma, for treatment.

The Pryor tornado ranks as the fifth deadliest in Oklahoma history behind tornadoes at Woodward in 1947, Snyder in 1905, Peggs in 1920, and Antlers in 1945. The May 3, 1999, tornado at Midwest City caused more damage but fewer deaths.

Talala residents said they did not see the typical funnel of a tornado in the storm. They described what looked like a series of streaks reaching from the clouds to the ground which leveled everything in their paths.

At Pryor Creek, however, the tornado had a definite funnel.
