= Pygmy race =

The term Pygmy race can refer to a number of things:

- Congo Pygmies- a group or race of short-statured people living in the Congo rain forests
- Pygmy peoples- various short-statured peoples from around the world who have been termed "pygmy"
- dwarfism- a condition, usually genetic, that causes short stature in populations
- Mythological figures
  - Dwarf (folklore)- a race of short-statured people described in Germanic mythology
  - Leprechauns- a race of short-statured people described in Irish mythology
  - Little people (mythology)- various mythologies pertaining to smaller-than-average groups of people
