= Medicine Rocks State Park =

State park in Montana, United States

- IUCN category V (protected landscape/seascape)
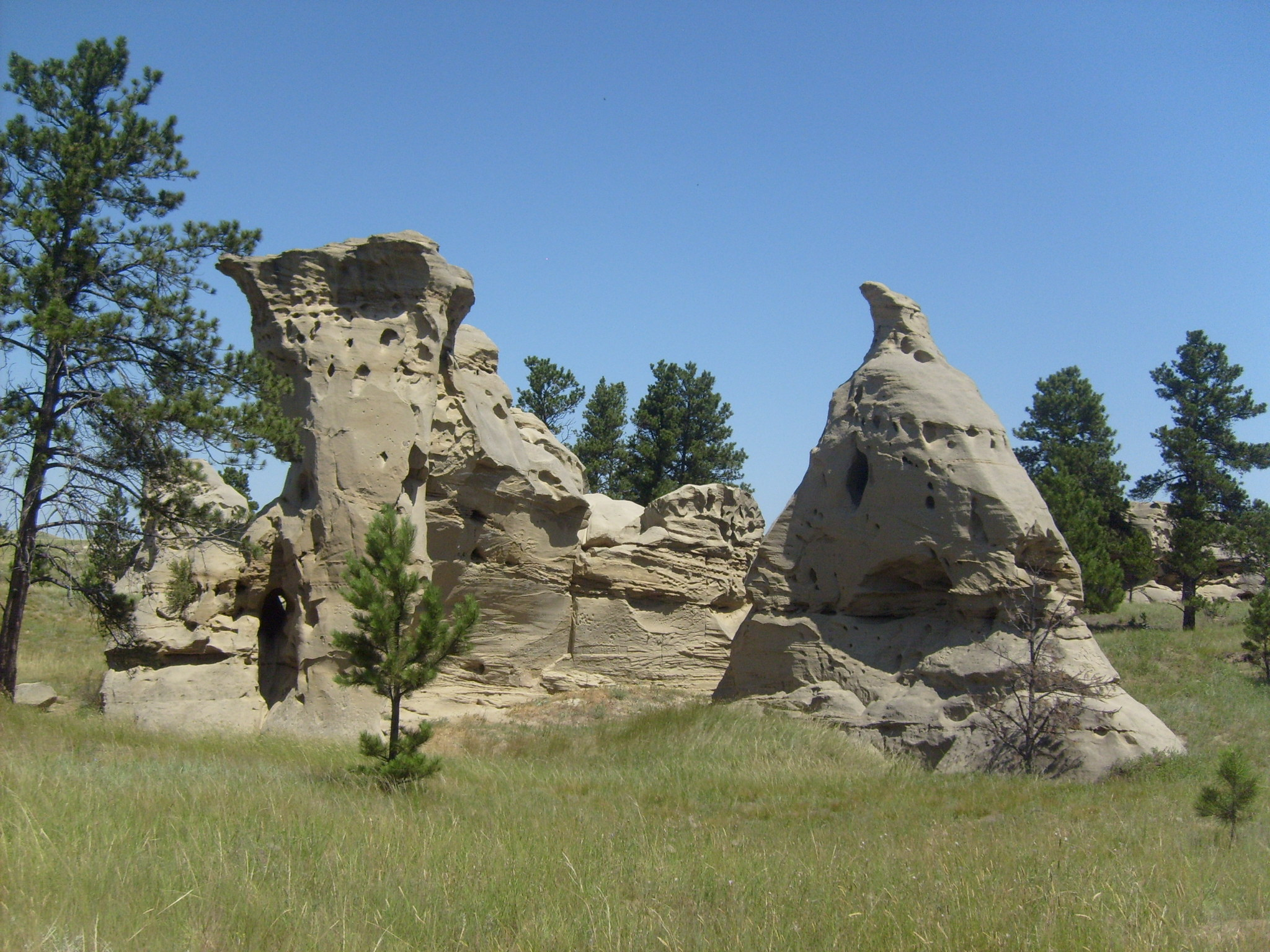
- Medicine Rocks State Park

- Location within Montana Location within the United States
- Location: Carter County, Montana, U.S.
- Nearest city: Ekalaka, Montana
- Coordinates: 46°02′40″N 104°28′17″W
- Area: 330 acres (130 ha)
- Elevation: 3,445 feet (1,050 m)
- Established: 1957
- Visitors: 21,244 (in 2023)
- Administrator: Montana Department of Fish, Wildlife and Parks
- Website: Medicine Rocks State Park

Medicine Rocks State Park is a park owned by the state of Montana in the United States. It is located about 25 miles (40 km) west-southwest of Baker, Montana, and 11 miles (18 km) north of Ekalaka, Montana. The park is named for the "Medicine Rocks", a series of sandstone pillars similar to hoodoos some 60 to 80 feet (18 to 24 m) high with eerie undulations, holes, and tunnels in them. The rocks contain numerous examples of Native American rock art and are considered a sacred place by Plains Indians. As a young rancher, future president Theodore Roosevelt said Medicine Rocks was "as fantastically beautiful a place as I have ever seen". The park is 330 acres (130 ha) in size, sits at 3,379 feet (1,030 m) in elevation, and is managed by the Montana Department of Fish, Wildlife and Parks. It was listed on the National Register of Historic Places in 2017 and designated as a certified International Dark Sky Sanctuary in 2020.

== Geology ==
Medicine Rocks is part of the Fort Union Formation, a geologic unit containing coal, sandstone, and shale in Montana, Wyoming, and other adjacent states. About 61 million years ago, near the start of the Paleocene Epoch and during the late Zuñi sequence, a freshwater river crossed what is now eastern Montana, flowing southeast into a prehistoric sea whose boundary was near far northwestern South Dakota (possibly the remains of the Western Interior Seaway). This river deposited large amounts of very fine-grained sand, which compacted into sandstone. On top of the freshwater sandstone was sand laid down by a saltwater estuary (indicated by the presence in this greyish layer of sandstone of burrows created by marine worms). Numerous fossils dating back 63.3 million years (to the Torrejonian North American Stage) can be found at the site, which help date the sandstone. These include several fossil snakes as well as teeth belonging to Plesiadapis anceps (an early primate-like mammal). The fossil remains of the primitive mammal Baiotomeus were discovered here in 1935.

Wind, dirt, sand, and rain carved the sandstone over the millennia, so that now the structures exhibit numerous arches, caves, columns, holes, pillars, and flat-topped towers. Some of the sandstone structures are 60 to 80 feet (18 to 24 m) in height, and can be 200 feet (61 m) across. There are more than 100 of the rocks and spires in the state park today. Some of them are clustered together as if part of a chain or train, while others jut up from the prairie in isolation.

According to Ed Belt, retired professor of geology at Amherst College, the Medicine Rocks sandstone is almost unique. "You have to go a long way to find a sand deposit of a similar age. And even then, you won't find thick sand and such a large concentration like you have at Medicine Rocks." It is also possible that the state park lies atop an unexposed fault.

== Habitation and significance of the site ==
Archaeological evidence indicates that there has been human habitation at or near Medicine Rocks for about 11,000 years. Aside from the other-worldly nature of the rock formations, Native Americans were attracted to the site because of the many medicinal plants which grew there and the fossil seashells which could be gathered for decorations. Many Plains Indian tribes resided here permanently or temporarily, including the A'aninin, Arikara, Assiniboine Sioux, Cheyenne, Crow, Mandan, and Sioux. The Cheyenne stopped at Medicine Rocks on their way from the Yellowstone River Valley to the Black Hills each summer and early fall. Sometime prior to the mid-17th century, the Hidatsa leader No-Vitals led a large number of Hidatsa out of what is now western North Dakota west into the Yellowstone River valley of south-central Montana, where the new tribe (the Crow) lived on the plains, by the river, and in the nearby Big Horn, Pryor, and Wolf Mountains. On the move due to pressure from eastern and midwestern tribes moving west due to white encroachment, the Crow may have settled in the Yellowstone Valley only a few decades before the arrival of Lewis and Clark in 1804. The Crow called the Medicine Rocks area Inyan-oka-lo-ka, or "rock with a hole in it". Bone and stone tools, fire rings (circles of stones used to contain a bonfire), pottery, teepee rings (circles of stones used to hold down the edges of a teepee), and other artifacts have all been found at Medicine Rocks.

All the tribes which stayed at Medicine Rocks considered the place holy. Each year, the Crow made an offering to the "Little People" (a race of tiny, ferocious, spiritually powerful dwarves) at Medicine Rocks, where they believed some Little People lived. Such gifts might include beads, paint, or tobacco. The Crow also made "fasting beds" out of rocks, on which they would lie down while seeking visions and dreams.

White settlers first moved into the area near Medicine Rocks in the 1880s. In 1888, the Standard Cattle Company established the "101 Ranch" in the area, which moved more than 30,000 head of cattle every year from Wyoming to Fallon County (Carter County then being part of Fallon County) and then to Wibaux (a cattle shipping hub for the Northern Pacific Railroad). Hundreds of cowboys worked the ranch, and many stayed—helping to "settle" the country for whites. Many of the cowpunchers carved their names or graffiti into the sandstone of Medicine Rocks. In the 1910s and 1920s, Medicine Rocks was a favorite picnic spot for local people, who often drove to the site every Sunday for feasting, entertainment, and conversation.

== State park ==
Medicine Rocks was privately owned and part of a working ranch from the 1880s. Carter County (carved out of Fallon County in 1917) seized the property in the 1930s to satisfy unpaid taxes. Carter County transferred ownership of the site to the state of Montana in February 1957. In 1990, the state parks department attempted to close Medicine Rocks State Park at night, but after 240 angry citizens showed up at a hearing in Baker the state relented. In 1991, the state attempted to charge a $3 entrance fee to access the park, but never enforced it after angry residents protested. The state eliminated the fee in 1993, but also declared Medicine Rocks a "primitive" park which the state would not improve or provide maintenance (such as trash removal).

Although most of the "medicine rocks" themselves are contained within the park, some are not. Some of the better-preserved and less vandalized medicine rocks are located on the privately owned Medicine Rocks Ranch, an Angus cattle ranch adjacent to the state park.

=== Access, services, and wildlife ===
Admittance is free. The park is open all year round via a dirt road (although the road may become impassable after heavy rains). Twelve primitive campsites are available at Medicine Rocks, as well as tables, fire rings, vault toilets, and cold spring water from a hand pump. Guests are asked to pack their own trash out. A six-mile (9.7 km) primitive trail with signage also exists, as does a steep one-mile (1.6 km) trail down to the nearby badlands.

Guests to the park may see bluebirds, coyotes, ferruginous hawks, golden eagles, kestrels, meadowlarks, merlins, Merriam's wild turkeys, mule deer, pronghorn, red foxes, nuthatches, prairie falcons, sharp-tailed grouse, and turkey vultures.

== See also ==
- Deer Medicine Rocks

== Bibliography ==
- Clawson, Roger and Shandera, Katherine A. Billings: The City and the People. Billings, Mont.: Montana Magazine, 1993.
- Crow Dog, Leonard and Erdoes, Richard. Crow Dog: Four Generations of Sioux Medicine Men. New York: HarperCollins Publishers, 1995.
- Federal Writers' Project. Montana: A State Guide Book. New York: Hastings House, 1949.
- Fletcher, Robert H.; Bradshaw, Glenda Clay; Axline, Jon; and Shope, Irvin. Montana's Historical Highway Markers. Helena, Mont.: Montana Historical Society Press, 2008.
- French, Brett. "Rock of Ages". Montana Outdoors. July/August 2005. Reprinted in Indian Education for All, Montana State Parks Lesson Plan, Medicine Rocks State Park, Montana Office for Public Instruction, January 2010.
- Graham, Kenneth Lee. Camping Montana. Guilford, Conn.: Falcon, 2003.
- Haney, Chuck. Badlands of the High Plains. Helena, Mont.: Farcountry Press, 2001.
- Husar, John. "Alone Amidst Medicine Rocks, the Spirits Will Touch You". Chicago Tribune. November 18, 1990.
- Hauck, Dennis William. Haunted Places: The National Directory. New York: Penguin Books, 2002.
- Hawthorn, Vic. Rocky Mountain States. London: Lonely Planet, 2001.
- Holman, J. Alan. Fossil Snakes of North America: Origin, Evolution, Distribution, Paleoecology. Bloomington, Ind.: Indiana University Press, 2000.
- Johnson, Kirk R. and Troll, Ray. Cruisin' the Fossil Freeway: An Epoch Tale of a Scientist and an Artist on the Ultimate 5,000-Mile Paleo Road Trip. Golden, Colo.: Fulcrum Publishing, 2007.
- Keyser, James D. and Klassen, Michael A. Plains Indian Rock Art. Seattle: University of Washington Press, 2001.
- Krause, David W. "Baiotomeus, a New Ptilodontid Multituberculate (Mammalia) from the Middle Paleocene of Western North America". Journal of Paleontology. 61:3 (May 1987).
- McCoy, Michael. Montana: Off the Beaten Path. Guilford, Conn.: Globe Pequot Press, 2007.
- McKee, Jennifer. "State Parks Director to Retire". Billings Gazette. December 5, 2005.
- McRae, W.C. and Jewell, Judy. Montana. Berkeley, Calif.: Avalon Travel Publishers, 2009.
- Montgomery, M.R. Many Rivers to Cross: Of Good Running Water, Native Trout, and the Remains Of Wilderness. New York: Simon and Schuster, 1996.
- "News From the States". Planning and Civic Comment. March 1957.
- Off the Beaten Path: A Travel Guide to More Than 1,000 Scenic and Interesting Places Still Uncrowded and Inviting. Pleasantville, N.Y.: Reader's Digest Association, 2003.
- Schalla, Robert A. and Johnson, Eric H. Montana/Alberta Thrust Belt and Adjacent Foreland. Billings, Mont.: Montana Geological Society, 2000.
- Small, Lawrence F. Religion in Montana: Pathways to the Present. Billings, Mont.: Rocky Mountain College, 1992.
- Snyder, S.A. Scenic Driving Montana. Helena, Mont.: Falcon Publishing, 2005.
- Sullivan, Lawrence Eugene. Native Religions and Cultures of North America: Anthropology of the Sacred. New York: Continuum, 2000.
- Woodburne, Michael O. Late Cretaceous and Cenozoic Mammals of North America: Biostratigraphy and Geochronology. New York: Columbia University Press, 2004.
