= Iubdan =

Mythological Celtic ruler

Iubdan is a mythological Celtic ruler. He was the king of the Wee Folk or Tiny People.

== Description ==
Iubdan would brag about his greatness. To teach him a lesson, the court poet told the king and his wife Queen Bebo about the land of giants, Ulster, and their porridge. Iubdan wished to demonstrate his greatness to the king of Ulster, Fergus Mac Leda, so Iubdan and his Queen traveled to the see giants. Iubdan wanted to taste the porridge without the giants seeing him before daybreak. While trying to taste it, Iubdan and Bebo fell into the porridge. In the morning, the giants found them and they were taken to Fergus as prisoners. Fergus finally let them go after a year and a day in exchange for Iubdan's most valuable possession: a pair of magical shoes that would let Fergus walk on water.
