= Yehasuri =

The Yehasuri are two feet tall creatures that are part of an ancient Catawba legend and are said to live on the Catawba Indian Reservation in South Carolina. Their name translates to "wild little people". They are tricksters and are generally depicted as small, but otherwise ordinary-looking people. The Catawba believe that they live in tree stumps and eat a wide variety of food, such as frogs and bugs. They are said to be vicious on occasion, and the Catawba believe the only way to stop them is to rub tobacco on one's hand and recite the ancient Catawba prayer "dugare ini para'ti na yehasuri deme hana te we stere yanamusi sere".

== See also ==
- Little people (mythology)
