= Battle of Pryor Creek =

1861 battle between Sioux and Crow

The Battle of Pryor Creek was an 1861 battle just north of Pryor, Montana, between the Sioux and Crow Native American tribes.

The battle began near Sheridan, Wyoming. The Crow heard a rumor that the Sioux, Cheyenne and Arapaho were going to attack a Crow village on the Tongue River. The Crow fled northwest, but the attackers caught up with them at Arrow Creek. Arrow Creek was difficult to cross – a very defensible position. It was one of the largest battles the Crow ever fought, as they had to fight for their nation's existence.
