= Pryor, Montana =

Pryor, Montana Baáhpuuo
- Census-designated place
- Location of Pryor, Montana
- Coordinates: 45°24′56″N 108°32′29″W
- Country: United States
- State: Montana
- County: Big Horn

Area
  - Total: 39.81 sq mi (103.11 km^{2})
  - Land: 39.80 sq mi (103.09 km^{2})
  - Water: 0.0077 sq mi (0.02 km^{2})
- Elevation: 4,164 ft (1,269 m)

Population (2020)
  - Total: 637
  - Density: 16.0/sq mi (6.18/km^{2})
- Time zone: UTC-7 (Mountain (MST))
  - Summer (DST): UTC-6 (MDT)
- ZIP code: 59066
- Area code: 406
- FIPS code: 30-59950
- GNIS feature ID: 2409106

Pryor (Crow: Baáhpuuo) is a census-designated place (CDP) in Big Horn County, Montana, United States. The community is located on the Crow Indian Reservation. The population was 637 at the 2020 census. It was 618 at the 2010 census.

The area, including nearby mountains and a creek, is named for Nathaniel Hale Pryor, a sergeant in the Lewis and Clark Expedition. The first post office opened in 1892 with Emma C. Stoeckel as postmaster. The Chicago, Burlington and Quincy Railroad built a line through the valley in 1900. It discontinued service in 1910.

It is home to Chief Plenty Coups State Park. He was the last traditional tribal chief of the Apsáalooke people.

== Geography ==
According to the United States Census Bureau, the CDP has a total area of 39.8 square miles (103.0 km^{2}), of which 0.0077 square miles (0.02 km^{2}), or 0.02%, is water.

=== Climate ===
According to the Köppen Climate Classification system, Pryor has a semi-arid climate, abbreviated "BSk" on climate maps.

== Demographics ==
Historical population
Census	Pop.	Note	%±
2020	637		—
U.S. Decennial Census

As of the census of 2000, there were 628 people, 166 households, and 140 families residing in the CDP. The population density was 15.8 people per square mile (6.1/km^{2}). There were 197 housing units at an average density of 5.0 per square mile (1.9/km^{2}). The racial makeup of the CDP was 12.58% White, 84.87% Native American, 0.16% Asian, and 2.39% from two or more races. Hispanic or Latino of any race were 1.27% of the population.

There were 166 households, out of which 44.6% had children under the age of 18 living with them, 56.0% were married couples living together, 23.5% had a female householder with no husband present, and 15.1% were non-families. 13.9% of all households were made up of individuals, and 6.0% had someone living alone who was 65 years of age or older. The average household size was 3.78 and the average family size was 4.16.

In the CDP, the population was spread out, with 39.5% under the age of 18, 9.4% from 18 to 24, 23.7% from 25 to 44, 19.3% from 45 to 64, and 8.1% who were 65 years of age or older. The median age was 26 years. For every 100 females, there were 106.6 males. For every 100 females age 18 and over, there were 88.1 males.

The median income for a household in the CDP was $25,096, and the median income for a family was $25,865. Males had a median income of $20,000 versus $14,625 for females. The per capita income for the CDP was $7,640. About 21.8% of families and 27.2% of the population were below the poverty line, including 35.6% of those under age 18 and 34.3% of those age 65 or over.

== Education ==
Pryor Public Schools educates students from kindergarten through 12th grade. There is Arrow Creek Elementary and Plenty Coups Jr./Sr. High. There were 64 students in 9th through 12th grade during the 2024-2025 school year. Their team name is Warriors.

== See also ==
- Battle of Pryor Creek
