= Aziza (mythology) =

Supernatural race in Dahomean religion

The Aziza are a type of beneficent supernatural race in West African (specifically, Dahomey) mythology. Living in the forest, they provide good magic for hunters. They are also known to have given practical and spiritual knowledge to people (including knowledge of the use of fire). The Aziza are described as little people and are said to live in anthills and silk-cotton trees. The plant genus Aziza has been named in their honour.

While the Aziza are usually described as a people, some traditions also refer to a single individual by name "Aziza", with similar traits. For example, Jeje oral tradition has a divinity called "Aziza" (described as a small, single-legged man smoking a pipe).

Aziza is also a god of the Urhobo people of the Western Niger Delta of Nigeria.

However there is only one original source for the winged aziza and it was only recorded after contact with Europeans during the Atlantic slave trade, all other source claim them to be just small people and seeing the almost identical appearance with the European fairy it's unknown how much they influenced the winged aziza or the aziza influenced the European fairy.
