= Little people (mythology) =

Mythological humanoid creatures of small stature

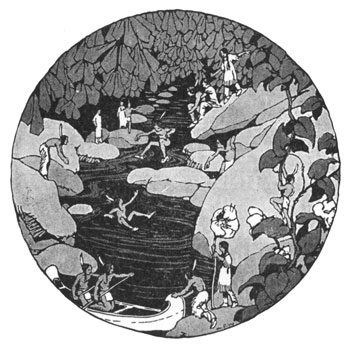
Native American "Little People" from Stories the Iroquois Tell Their Children by Mabel Powers, 1917

The Little people have been part of the folklore of many cultures in human history, including Ireland, Greece, the Philippines, the Hawaiian Islands, New Zealand, Australia, Flores Island, Indonesia, and Native Americans.

== Native American folklore ==
The Native peoples of North America told legends of a race of "little people" who lived in the woods near sandy hills and sometimes near rocks located along large bodies of water, such as the Great Lakes. Often described as "hairy-faced dwarfs" in stories, petroglyph illustrations show them with horns on their head and traveling in a group of 5 to 7 per canoe. The Pryor Mountains of Montana and Wyoming are said to house "fairy rings"

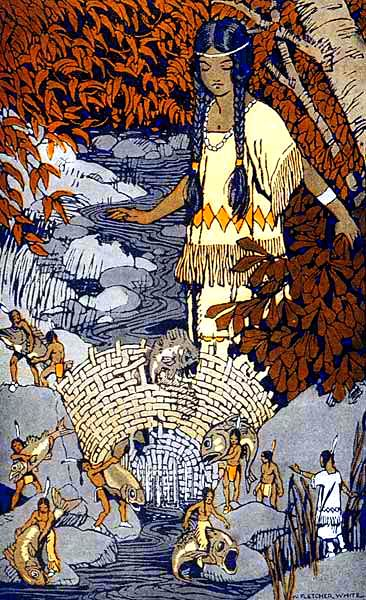
"How Morning Star Lost Her Fish", from Stories the Iroquois Tell Their Children by Mabel Powers, 1917

Other legends say the little people, if seen by an adult human, would beg them not to say anything of their existence and would reward those who kept their word by helping them and their family out in times of need. From tribe to tribe there are variations of what the little people's mannerisms were like, and whether they were good or evil, may be different. One common belief is that the little people create distractions to cause mischief.

Lewis and Clark reported in their journals that Native Americans in the vicinity of Spirit Mound, South Dakota held a belief in little people who inhabited the mound. Clark wrote that the local Native Americans could not be persuaded to approach the mound, as they feared these tiny "Deavals" and considered them to be dangerous. Although members of Lewis and Clark's party visited the mound, they did not encounter any unusual beings.

=== Native American Wee Folk ===
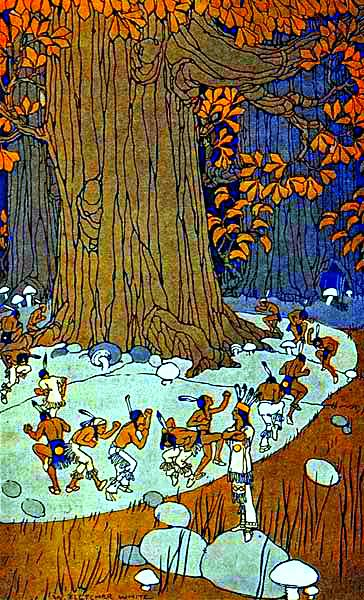
Little people from Stories Iroquois Tell Their Children by Mabel Powers, 1917

- Alux - Maya
- Canotila - Lakota
- Chaneque - Aztec
- Geow-lud-mo-sis-eg - Maliseet
- Jogah - Iroquois
- Mannegishi - Cree
- Memegwesi/Memegawensi/Memengweshii/Pa'iins - Anishinaabe
- Nimerigar - legendary race of little people found in the folklore of the Shoshone
- Nirumbee or Awwakkulé - Crow
- Iyaaknasha' or Hattak Sawa' - Chickasaw
- Bohpuli or Kowi Anukʋsha - Choctaw
- Pukwudgie - Wampanoag
- Yehasuri - Catawba
- Yunwi Tsunsdi - Cherokee

==== Memegwaans ====
Ojibwe myths also bring up a creature known as the Memegwaans, or Memegwaanswag (Plural), which seems to be different from the more common Little People variation of Memegwesi. According to Basil H. Johnston, a Memegwaans is a little person without definitive form which is terrified of adult humans. However, it seems to have a soft spot for children and will often approach in the guise of a child to any young person who seems upset, injured, scared or lonely and either protect them or keep them company until help arrives. If an adult sees one, they will often cower on the ground, screaming and crying hysterically before vanishing in the blink of an eye. They were also known as protectors of copper mines and were prayed to almost as patron saints of lost children. This is more specific and different from the Memegwesi, which is often simply described as a short, hairy man.

== African folklore ==
Small magical beings found in various folklores across the continent of Africa.

- Abatwa - A race of tiny people who live among ants and grass; seen only by children, pregnant women, or the very lucky. Can be proud and touchy. Zulu folklore.
- Aziza (African mythology) - Dahomey little people who live in anthills and silk-cotton trees
- Egbere - Yoruba nocturnal weeping gnome
- Eloko - A race of hairy dwarf-like forest beings
- Madebele - Senufo mythology
- Mmoetia - A race of creatures of Ghanaian myth with analogues to fairy lore
- Tikoloshe - Malevolent goblins invoked via magic. Zulu folklore.
- Yumboes - African wee folk attested to in Thomas Keightley's The Fairy Mythology
- Zankallala - A rodent-riding trickster of the Hausa people

== Celtic folklore ==
Below is a listing of wee folk from Irish, Scottish, Welsh, Manx, and Breton traditions.

- Bluecap
- Brownie - Scottish domestic fairy
- Changeling
- Clurichaun - Irish solitary fairy similar to a Leprechaun, albeit more inebriated
- Coblyn - Welsh and Welsh-American knocker similar to bluecap
- Far Darrig - Vicious leprechaun-like Irish fairy clad in red.
- Grogoch - A hairy, half-human creature from Irish and Scottish Isles
- Leprechaun - A race of little bodied Celtic solitary fairies
- Mooinjer veggey - Manx Gaelic little people
- Púca - A shapeshifting trickster from Irish folklore who enjoys giving piggyback rides
- Redcap - Scottish evil goblin, also known as Powrie
- Sluagh - Celtic Unseelie trooping bogey
- Spriggans - Unseelie members of the fairy realm in Cornish folklore
- Tylwyth Teg - Welsh fair folk

== Philippine folklore ==
- Nuno sa Punso - Dwarf-like spirits from Philippine mythology who live in anthills
- Tiyanak - A vampiric changeling in Philippine mythology
- Duwende - Filipino duende living in burrows

== Other types of little people in mythology ==
Though not universal, wee folk tend to have two physical features in common: diminutive stature and pointed ears. They may or may not have beards or wings, though rarely both simultaneously.

- Di sma undar jordi - Gutnish (in Sweden) for "the small ones underground"
- Dokkaebi - also known as "Korean goblins"
- Domovoy - Slavic house elf
- Duende in the Spanish-speaking world
- Dwarves - A broad class of short and stout supernatural being in Germanic folklore
- Elves - A broad class of pointed ear supernatural being in Germanic folklore
- Fions - A militaristic trooping lutins associated with Brittany
- Gnome - A race of mountain manikins introduced by Paracelsus in the 16th century
- Goblin - A broad class of kobold, known for having evil temperament
- Gremlin - A fictional creature invented at the beginning of the 20th century, known for tampering with aircraft
- Grindylow - English folklore of pond dwelling Unseelie with names like Peg Powler, Nelly Longarms, and Jenny Greenteeth
- Guhyaka - A hidden one of Hindu myth
- Gütel - A race of bearded Saxon mining sprites
- Heimchen - A race of cricket-sized dwarves, companions of Perchta
- Heinzelmännchen - A helpful household spirits associated with Christmas
- Hob
- Hobgoblin
- Imp
- Iratxo
- Jenglot
- Jetins
- Kabouter - Dutch gnomes known for wearing Phrygian caps
- Kaichigo
- Kallikantzaros - Southeast European
- Kijimuna - A race of small wood spirits according to Okinawan mythology
- Kobold - German unseelie gnome
- Korpokkur - A folklore of the Ainu people
- Krasnoludek - Polish type of gnome or dwarf
- Lutin - A broad class of French goblin
- Menehune - A legendary wee folk from Hawaiian mythology
- Muki - A broad class of subterranean knocker goblin within the Central Andes
- Niß Puk - A "tautological juxtaposition" of Nisse and Puck, these legendary helpers are present in Danish, Frisian and German mythology
- Patupaiarehe - New Zealand Maori mythology
- Pixies - A diminutive pointed ear humanoid of British folklore
- Polevik - A grassy Slavic spirit known to lead wandering people astray
- Pombero - Guarani mythology bogeyman
- Pygmy (Greek_mythology)
- Sprite (folklore) - European ethereal fairy-like spirit associated with air
- Sylph - A race of air spirits introduced by Paracelsus in the 16th century
- Ta'ai, or 小黑人 - in the mythology of, or remembered by, the Saisiyat people of Taiwan
- Tomte / Tonttu / Nisse - Scandinavian Folklore
- Trauco - A humanoid creature of small stature in Chilote mythology
- Trows - Orkney and Shetland folklore of size-changing trolls
- Zlydzens - A race of small, hunchbacked creatures in Belarusian mythology

== Little people in constructed literary mythologies ==
- Christmas Elves - first introduced in literature by Louisa May Alcott in 1856
- Halflings - A race of fictional short people created due to the litigiousness of Tolkien's estate. They are also called Hobbits.
- Kenders - A fictional fantasy race developed for the Dragonlance campaign setting
- Lilliputians and Blefuscudians - Two different little people races in Gulliver's Travels.
- Little green men
- Oompa-Loompas - A race of short people from Loompaland who originate in Charlie and the Chocolate Factory.
- Smurfs - A race of blue-skinned people that live in mushrooms.

=== Other little people in literature ===
- Iubdan
- Rumpelstiltskin
- The Borrowers by Mary Norton
- The Littles by John Peterson
- The Wee Free Men by Terry Pratchett
- The Nome Trilogy by Terry Pratchett
- The Spiderwick Chronicles by Holly Black and Tony DiTerlizzi
- 1q84 by Haruki Murakami
- Taltos by Anne Rice

== See also ==
- Giants
- Gods

== Bibliography ==
- Daniels, Cora Linn and Stevens, C.M. Encyclopaedia of Superstitions, Folklore, and the Occult Sciences of the World. Milwaukee, Wisc.: J. H. Tewdai & Sons, 1903.
- Frey, Rodney. The World of the Crow Indians: As Driftwood Lodges. Norman, Okla.: University of Oklahoma Press, 1993.
- Dubois, Pierre. La Grande Encyclopédie des fées et autres petites créatures. Illustrated by Claudine and Roland Sabatier. Paris: Hoëbeke, 1996.
