= Nathaniel Hale Pryor =

American explorer (1772–1831)

Nathaniel Hale Pryor (1772–1831) was an American explorer who served as Sergeant in the Lewis and Clark Expedition.

== Early life and family ==
Nathaniel Pryor was born in Amherst County, Virginia and was a cousin of fellow expedition member Charles Floyd. A letter written by Sam Houston to President Andrew Jackson on Pryor's behalf noted that Pryor was a first cousin to John Floyd, governor of Virginia. Nathaniel was the son of John Pryor and his wife Nancy Floyd. The Pryor and Floyd families moved to Kentucky when he was eleven. Both parents were deceased by 1791 when Nathaniel and his brother Robert were recorded as orphans in Jefferson County court records, and apprenticed to Obediah Newman. It is interesting to note that Nathaniel, Robert, and their other Floyd cousins, were great-grandchildren (x3) of Nicketti, identified as a daughter of Powhatan and sister of Pocahontas.

Nathaniel married Margaret Patton on May 17, 1798, it is believed she died young, but they were still married in October 1803 when he was recorded as the only married member of the Lewis and Clark Expedition. In 1821 Pryor married an Osage Indian woman, her name is not known, they had several children. Additionally, 1848 marriage records at Mission San Gabriel, California, identify a man named Nathaniel Pryor (aka Miguel Pryor), born about 1806 in Kentucky, as the son of Nathaniel Pryor of Louisville and Mary Davis. No other information on this relationship has been found, it is not known if Pryor and Davis were married. This information indicates that Nathaniel possibly returned to Kentucky, fathering a son, after his journey westward.

== Lewis and Clark Expedition ==
He joined the expedition on October 20, 1803, in Clarksville, Indiana; he was one of the "nine young men from Kentucky" who joined the Corps. It was the rule not to hire married men, but an exception was made for Pryor, this says much for his abilities and the high esteem in which he was held. Pryor was made sergeant in 1804, and led the First Squad of six privates. William Clark later wrote, "Capt. Pryor served with me, on an expedition to the Pacific ocean in 1803, 4, 5, and 6 in the capacity of 1st Sergeant." Lewis and Clark considered Pryor "a man of character and ability." In June, 1804 he presided over a court martial of privates John Collins and Hugh Hall, accused of theft of whiskey and drinking on duty; the men were found guilty and sentenced to a flogging. Nathaniel's cousin, Charles Floyd, died on August 20, 1804, the only member of the Corps of Discovery to die during the expedition.

== After the Expedition ==
In 1807 he was put in charge of an expedition to return Mandan chief Sheheke to his tribe, but he was forced to turn back when attacked by Arikaras.

Pryor resigned from the army in 1810, secured an Indian trader's license and established a fur trading post and lead-smelting furnace along the Upper Mississippi at the mouth of the Galena River. Pryor was secretly recruited about 1811, at the request of William Clark, then Indian agent in the Missouri Territory, to gather reconnaissance on the Shawnee Indian Chief Tecumseh and his brother, The Prophet. The information he provided probably lead to the November 7, 1811 Battle of Tippecanoe. On January 1, 1812, a party of Winnebago Indians, that had been caught up in the battle at Tippecanoe, and intent on revenge, attacked Pryor's establishment and that of a fellow trader, George Hunt. Pryor was able to escape only with the help of a resident Sauk Indian woman. His establishment was a total loss, burned to the ground. Nathaniel crossed the frozen Mississippi to Missouri, found refuge for the winter in a village of French farmers, and only returned to St. Louis in the spring of 1812. This resulted in an erroneous report of his death in national newspapers in 1812: "Gen. Wm. Clark, of St. Louis, has written to his brother at Louisville, informing him, that a party of Puant Indians, who reside on the waters of the Illinois river, and who belonged to the Prophet's party, has robbed the trading houses of Mr. G. Hunt, and Nathaniel Pryor, Esq. killed Pryor, and two of Hunt's men—Hunt escaped."

== War of 1812 ==
Pryor rejoined the army during the War of 1812 and, with help from Clark, was commissioned a Captain, serving in the Battle of New Orleans in 1815. Later that same year his regiment was disbanded and Pryor resumed trading with the Indians but relocated to the Arkansas River. In 1825-28 Clark listed former Expedition members and recorded Pryor at Fort Smith.

== Living on the Frontier ==
In 1819 Pryor was given permission to trade with the Osage Nation. He returned to the fur trade after the war, and in 1820 established a trading post on present-day Grand River near Pryor Creek, Oklahoma. Another erroneous report of his death appeared in the press in February 1822, stating he had been killed by a group of Cherokees. He married an Osage woman and had several children. With Sam Houston in 1829 and 1830, Pryor met with Claremont the Osage chief, and Matthew Arbuckle to avoid a war between the Osage and Delaware tribes. Houston was instrumental in recommending Pryor to President Andrew Jackson for a government post as an Indian agent. He served briefly as government agent for the Osages, and represented the tribe in negotiations with the military at nearby Forts Smith and Gibson, from 1830 to his death in 1831.

== Pattie's Expedition and California ==
Nathaniel Pryor was recorded as part of an expedition of fur traders now known as the Pattie's Expedition, that left Santa Fe, Mexican Territory, in 1827. Arriving at Santa Catarina Mission, Alta California, then Mexico, the traders were arrested on March 22, 1828, as Spanish spies by Mexican governor, Jose de Maria Echeandia, and brought to San Diego. The party remained captive until February 1829. This Nathaniel Pryor is sometimes reported to be the same man who traveled with Lewis and Clark, and sometimes reported to be his son, the one found living at San Gabriel Mission in 1838. Considering Nathan Hale Pryor's vast experience with the fur trade, his experience and skill with frontier survival and Indian languages, the fact that he was repeatedly used by the US Army in the capacity of spy and to reconnoiter information, it is very plausible that it was he that was part of the Pattie Party. It was during this period that the United States made attempts to buy Texas and floods of people left the United States for the newly formed Mexican territories of Nuevo México and Alta California. Pryor could well have been sent, as a spy for the U.S. not Spain, to gather intel about the region for the US Army. Released in February 1829, he could have easily returned to Pryor Creek, Oklahoma in time to assist Sam Houston in his Osage negotiations.

== Legacy ==
Pryor Creek, Oklahoma, Pryor, Montana, and the Pryor Mountains are named for him.
