= Emere =

Disguised spirit in Yoruba culture

An emere, in traditional Yoruba culture, is a child who can travel between the spiritual and physical world at will. A negative connotation is associated with the word, as it implies that a family's child may disappear and reappear at will. The impatient emere wants the best of heaven and Earth. An emere is a spirit in disguise, misrepresenting death as life, and is clever enough to disguise its objectives. Believed to be more powerful than Iyami Aje, they most often die on a particular day of joy. On wedding days, when having their first baby, graduation from university etc., depending on the degree of happiness the event might cause. They are also believed to be extremely pretty, and have seductive powers.

The emere gives unconditional support to heaven while on earth, distorting the balance of power, betraying Earth and its followers, annoyed that Earth did not allow visitors from heaven.

An emere is usually considered to be female.

== See also ==
- Abiku

== Sources ==
- Falola,. A Mouth Sweeter Than Salt. University of Michigan Press Copyright 2005. p. 73-75.
