= Akbaalia =

Native American mythological figure

Akbaalía is a Native American mythological figure of the Plains Indians Crow Nation people. It is a healer that can cure a wide range of physical and psychological ailments.
