= Chief Plenty Coups (Alek-Chea-Ahoosh) State Park and Home =

- Chief Plenty Coups (Alek-Chea-Ahoosh) Home
- U.S. National Register of Historic Places
- U.S. National Historic Landmark
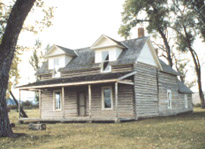
- House of Chief Plenty Coups at Chief Plenty Coups State Park.

- Location within Montana Location within the United States
- Nearest city: Pryor, Montana
- Coordinates: 45°25′40″N 108°32′53″W
- Area: 190 acres (77 ha)
- Website: Official website
- NRHP reference No.: 70000354

Significant dates
- Added to NRHP: October 6, 1970
- Designated NHL: January 20, 1999

Chief Plenty Coups State Park is a state park located approximately 0.5 miles (0.8 km) west of Pryor, Montana, on the Crow Indian Reservation. Chief Plenty Coups' (Alek-Chea-Ahoosh) Home, located in the state park, is a National Historic Landmark with several contributing resources. The homestead was listed on the U.S. National Register of Historic Places in 1970 and became a National Historic Landmark in 1999. The 195-acre (79 ha) property belonged to Chief Plenty Coups, the last traditional tribal Chief of the Apsáalooke people. He and his wife, Strikes the Iron, left their home and property to all people in 1928. The only museum of Apsáalooke culture in the United States is located here along with a memorial to Plenty Coups and his achievements.

== Park history ==
In a vision as a young man, Chief Plenty Coups saw his future as an old man sitting in the shade of trees with a house and spring nearby. In 1883, he settled on an allotment of 320 acres (130 ha) on the Crow Indian Reservation where he had seen his vision, and built a log homestead beginning in 1884. After he visited Mount Vernon in 1880, Chief Plenty Coups built several additions to his house and planted Cottonwood trees, modeling his house after what he had seen at Mount Vernon. He also planted several apple trees in 1903 that are now listed as a Heritage Orchard. In 1928 he and his wife, Strikes the Iron, presented 189 acres (76 ha) of his land in trust to Big Horn County, including the house, spring, and trees Chief Plenty Coups had envisioned, saying:

Today, I who have been called Chief of Chiefs, among red men, present to all the children of our Great White Father this land where the snows of many winters have fallen on my tepee. This park is not to be a memorial to me, but to the Crow Nation. It is given as a token of my friendship for all people, both red and white.

Upon Chief Plenty Coups' death in 1932, the Big Horn County Commission assumed responsibility and employed a caretaker for the farm and buildings. The Billings Kiwanis Club took stewardship of the land in 1951. The club operated a small museum in the house and placed small sandstone markers at the grave sites of Chief Plenty Coups and his wives. In 1961, the site entered state ownership under the control of the Montana State Highway Commission, who in turn passed it on to the parks division of the Montana Fish and Game Department, the predecessor to today's Montana Fish, Wildlife and Parks, in 1965. It was at this time that Chief Plenty Coups' land became a state park. In about 1970, the State of Montana purchased an additional small tract of 6.2 acres (2.5 ha) for access and park structures, bringing the total to today's area of 195.4 acres (79.1 ha). This additional parcel had been part of an allotment to Chief Plenty Coups' wife, Kills Together, who died in 1923.

Neglect took a toll through the decades of the 1950s and 60s and under threat of lawsuit, the state, along with tribal and private donors, built a visitor center and museum in 1972. The house that Plenty Coups had begun in 1884 was stabilized in 1993 and 1994. In 2003, the state spent US$600,000 (equivalent to $1,050,000 in 2025) on renovations and improvements to the museum including the addition of a fire suppression system and other building safety features and refurbishment of the interpretative displays.

The park is now a quiet place to enjoy a walk or a picnic and is open year-round. The visitor center/museum and the Chief's House are open to the public. The park also offers educational programs for schools and groups. On Labor Day weekend, Chief Plenty Coups State Park's main event is Day of Honor. This event is open to all, and many members of the Crow or Apsaalooké also come out to enjoy free food and dancing.

== See also ==
- List of National Historic Landmarks in Montana
- National Register of Historic Places listings in Big Horn County, Montana
