= Kotan Utunnai =

Ainu epic

Kotan Utunnai is an Ainu epic. It is a story of unknown authorship that deals with the hardships of war and desolation. The epic tells about the life of Poiyaunpe, or an unnamed character, a hero who grows up in a foreign land but discovers his Ainu ancestry and returns to his native people.

== Plot ==
The hero, who is the narrator and a Yaunkur, learns that the Repunkur killed his parents. Taking his father's war gear, he sets out to avenge their deaths. In the land of the Repunkur, he finds his older brother imprisoned. With his sister's help, the hero frees his brother and kills his captors.

== Characters ==
- Nameless narrator
- Sister of the narrator
- Brother of the narrator, Kamui-Otopush, a great Yaunkur warrior
- Etu Rachichi, warrior of the Repunkur
- The Repunkur
