= Korpokkur =

Race of small people in Ainu folklore

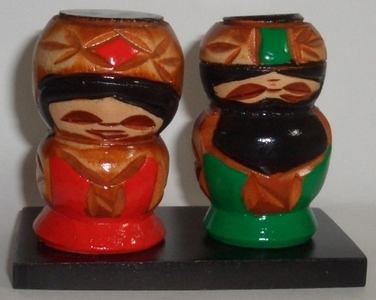
Wooden Koro-pok-guru dolls

The Korpokkur (Ainu: コㇿポックㇽ; Japanese: コロポックル, romanized: Koropokkuru), also written Koro-pok-kuru, korobokkuru, korbokkur, or koropokkur, koro-pok-guru, are a race of little people in folklore of the Ainu people of the northern Japanese islands.

The Ainu believe that the korpokkur were the people who lived in the Ainu land before the Ainu themselves lived there. They were short of stature, agile, and skilled at fishing. They lived in pits with roofs made from butterbur leaves. Long ago, the korpokkur were on good terms with the Ainu, and would send them deer, fish, and other game and exchange goods with them. The little people hated to be seen, however, so they would stealthily make their deliveries under the cover of night.

One day, a young Ainu man decided he wanted to see a korpokkur for himself, so he waited in ambush by the window where their gifts were usually left. When a korpokkur came to place something there, the young man grabbed it by the hand and dragged it inside. It turned out to be a beautiful korpokkur woman, who was so enraged at the young man's rudeness that her people have not been seen since. Their pits, pottery, and stone implements, the Ainu believe, still remain scattered about the landscape.

== Etymology ==
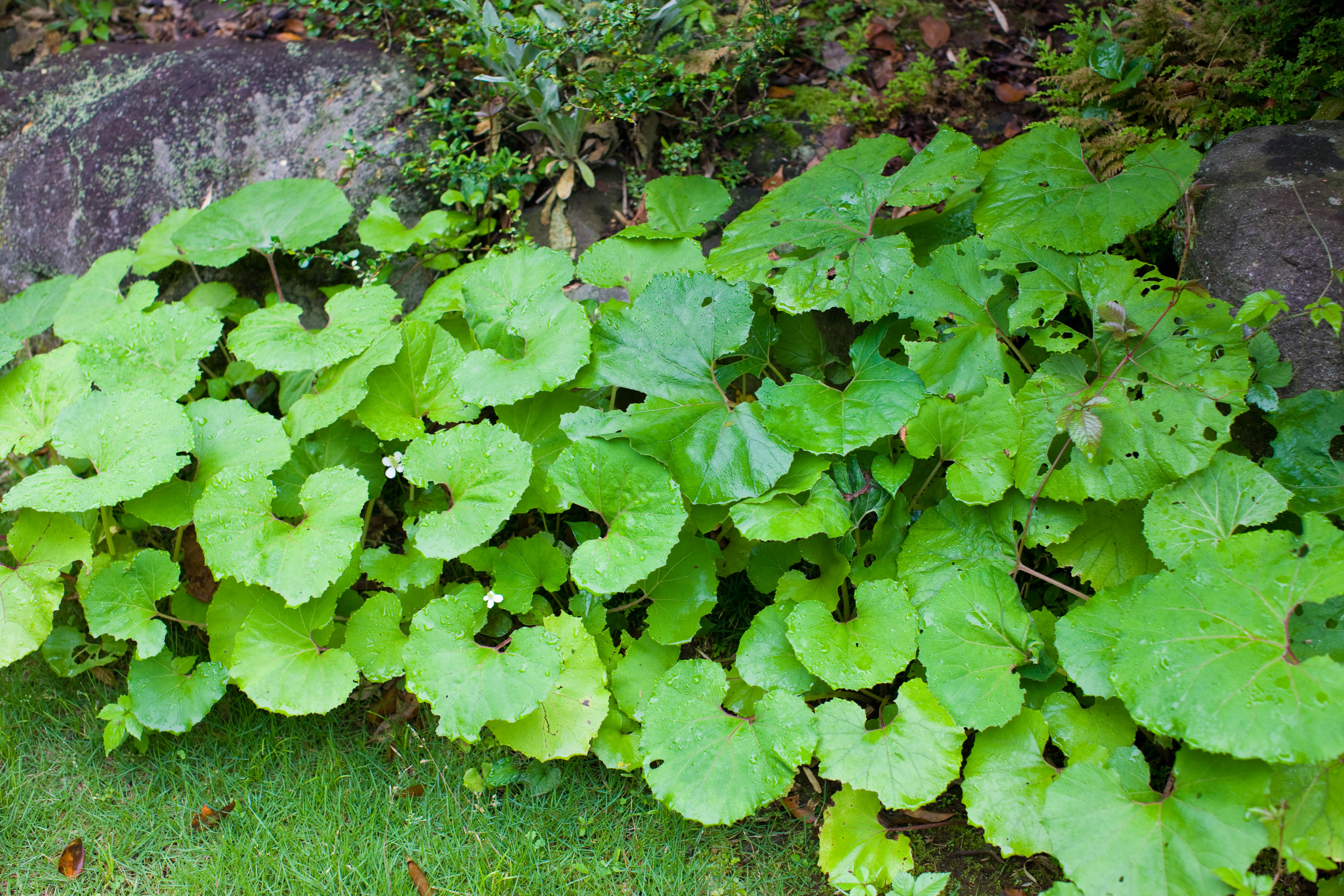
Petasites japonicus Sweet coltsfoot (苳, fuki)

The most common variations stem from the Japanese adaptation of Ainu words, which include phonemes not present in Japanese. In a completely different context, koro is a noun, a shortened form of korokoni, the Ainu word for sweet coltsfoot (苳, fuki). According to the missionary John Batchelor, this abbreviation is likely what fed into the popular folk etymology of Koropokkuru as “people under the butterbur,” even though structurally, "kor" in korpok‑un‑kur is part of a spatial compound. Batchelor suggests the original term may be reconstructed as "Korpok-un-kur". Respectively, "pok" = down; below, "un" = locative particle, "kur" (alternatively "kuru" or "guru") = person; man. "Korpok" (alternatively "corpok" or "choropok") is a compound that means "beneath, underground". Examples of Ainu words using such components include:

=== Pok ===
- Pokna Mosir (underworld, literally "the world below")
- Not-pok-omap (lit. "that under the jaw", a ritual morsel that is placed under the bear's jaw during the Iyomante)

=== Un ===
- Repunkur and Yaunkur (respectively "people of the sea" and "people of the land"), used contrastively in the epic Kotan Utunnai to differentiate the foreigners from across the sea from the Ainu themselves.
- Kim-un-kamuy ("god of the mountain", i.e. the Ussuri brown bear).

=== Kur ===
- See Repunkur and Yaunkur above
- The etymology of the name of the Kuril Islands is theorised to derive from Ainu "kur".
- Isikar-un-kur or Ishikari-un-kur (Ishikari Ainu).

== Anthropologic and folkloric discussions ==
Some 19th- and 20th-century anthropologists believed that the korpokkur were a "race that predated the Ainu". Arnold Henry Savage Landor proposed a theory about the indigenous people of Hokkaido, which suggested that the Ainu, migrating from the north, overtook and displaced an earlier population known as the Koro-pok-kuru. He believed the Koro-pok-kuru shared similarities with the Eskaleut speakers and may have arrived in Yezo from the Aleutian Islands. Allen P. McCartney equated the Okhotsk culture with the Korpokkur. Early ethnographer Tsuboi Shogoro (1863-1913) believed Korpokkur legends pointed to a previous population that the Ainu displaced or even eradicated. These conclusions mostly come from misinterpretations of Hokkaido Jōmon artifacts (such as pottery, tools, and arrowheads), which were understudied at the time and markedly different from what contemporaneous Ainu used.

Alexander Akulov refuted early anthropologists, stating that the pit-dwellings supposedly associated with the pre-Ainu aboriginal people were also built by the Ainu themselves in the Kuril Islands and Sakhalin, an argument also used by John Batchelor. Based on the evidence presented, Akulov concludes that the Koropok-Guru legend is nothing more than a story. It does not signify a mysterious pre-Ainu race, but rather reflects a traditional Ainu dwelling practice that predates significant Japanese influence. He cites Pozdneyev, arguing that the legend "was spread there where Ainu were already more or less japanized", quoting:

Further northward the legend has terminated, in the northern Kuril Islands there nobody knows anything about it, and Ainu of Northern Kurils not only tell that the islands were not inhabited by someone else but insisted that they had lived in these islands since very deep antiquity. Being interrogated about the remains of the Stone Age they confidently responded that these remains belong to their ancestors.

In his Ainu–English–Japanese Dictionary, John Batchelor says that certain pit-dwellings associated with the korpokkur were called "Koropok-un-guru koro chisei kot" or "Toi chisei kotcha utara kot chisei kot", respectively meaning "sites belonging to people who dwelt below ground" and "house sites of people who had earth houses." He argues that the original meaning of Koropok-guru was not "people of the Petasites plant", since Koropok can only be translated as “under, beneath, below.” The full name would be Koropok-un-guru, “people dwelling below,” un being a locative particle, which doesn't carry the idea of dwarves or little people. He further argues that, even if "Koropok-guru" literally meant "people under the Petasites" plant, it wouldn't imply dwarfish stature. Batchelor himself, standing nearly 5 ft. 8 in., could comfortably walk and even ride a pony amongst the Petasites leaves. He found it humorous to imagine how tall the people who named the pit-dwellers "dwarves" must have been if they considered movement beneath the plant indicative of short stature.

== See also ==
- Gnome
- Zoku-Jōmon period
- Nivkh people
- Okhotsk culture
- Little people (mythology)
