= Eloko =

African mythical creature

Eloko (pl. Biloko) is a term in a Mongo-Nkundo language referring to a kind of dwarf-like creature that lives in the forests. They are believed to be the spirits of ancestors of the people living there.

== Characteristics ==
Biloko live in the densest and darkest part of the rain forest in central Zaïre, jealously and ferociously guarding their treasures: the game and the rare fruits of the forest. Legend has it that they haunt the forest because they have some grudge to settle with the living and are generally quite vicious. The Biloko live in hollow trees and are dressed only in leaves. They have no hair; only grass grows on their bodies; they have piercing eyes, snouts with mouths that can be opened wide enough to admit a human body, alive or dead, and long, sharp claws. They possess little bells, which, in Central Africa are believed to be able to cast a spell on passers-by. Possessing an amulet or a fetish can offer protection from this type of magic.

== Mythology ==
Only the most fearless hunters are believed to enter the depths of the forest and live to tell the tale. Hunters are said to have strong magic that allows them to endure. There are many tales about wives who insist upon joining their husbands in the forest only to faint as soon as they see their first Eloko.

One Eloko tale, cited by Bantu linguist Jan Knappert, says:

One day a hunter took his wife, at her insistence, into the forest, where he had a hut with a palisade around it. When he went out to inspect his traps, he told her: "When you hear a bell, do not move. If you do, you will die!" Soon after he had left, she heard the charming sound of a little bell coming closer, for the Eloko has a good nose for feminine flesh. Finally, a gentle voice asked to be let in to his room. It was like the voice of a child. The woman opened the door and there was an Eloko, smelling like the forest, looking small and innocent. She offered him banana mash with fried fish but he refused: "We eat only human meat. I have not eaten for a long time. Give me a piece of your arm." At last the woman consented, totally under the spell of the Eloko. That night, the husband found her bones.

== Popular culture ==
In the 2021 novel Bacchanal by Veronica G. Henry, one of the minor characters is an eloko who is named Eloko. He is described as the last of his kind from Zaire and is always hungering for human flesh even though he has been forbidden from eating it.

Bethany C. Morrow's 2021 novel, A Chorus Rises, has a main character, Naema, who is called an eloko but does not have the typical mythological characteristics of one.

An Eloko serves as a major antagonist in the Dark Star trilogy by Marlon James and appears in both books Black Leopard, Red Wolf and Moon Witch, Spider King.
