= Pryor Mountains =

Mountain range in the U.S. states of Wyoming and Montana

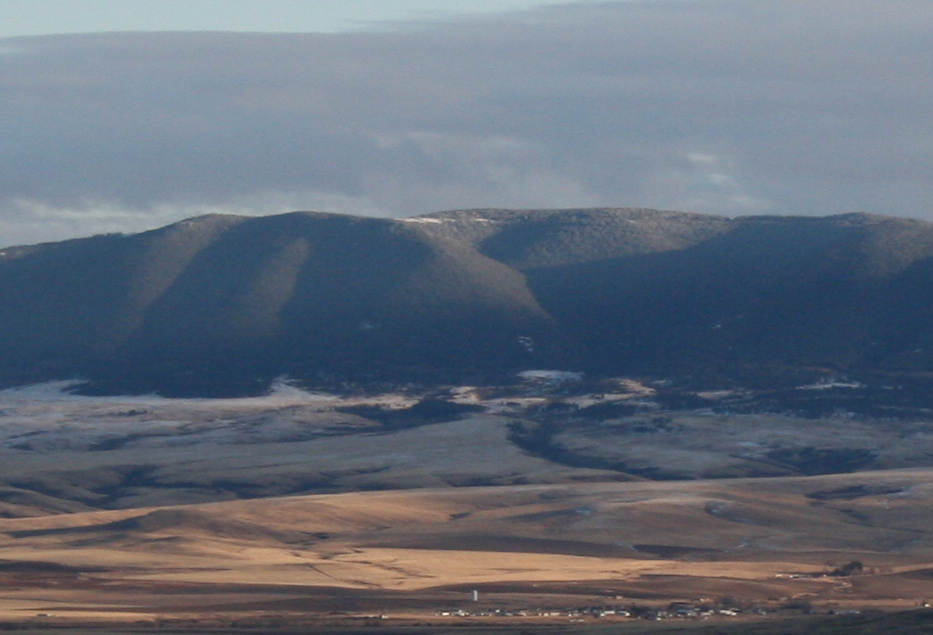
- Pryor Mountains

Highest point
- Peak: East Pryor Mountain
- Elevation: 8,776 ft (2,675 m)
- Coordinates: 45°10′06″N 108°20′07″W

Naming
- Native name: Baahpuuo Isawaxaawuua (Crow)

Geography
- Country: United States
- State: Montana

The Pryor Mountains are a mountain range in Carbon and Big Horn counties of Montana, and Big Horn County, Wyoming. They are located on the Crow Indian Reservation and the Custer National Forest, and portions of them are on private land. They lie south of Billings, Montana, and north of Lovell, Wyoming.

The mountains are named for Sergeant Nathaniel Hale Pryor, a member of the Lewis and Clark Expedition who vainly pursued horses stolen from the expedition in the area. The Crow Tribe, a Native American tribe which lived nearby, called the mountains Baahpuuo Isawaxaawuua ("Hitting Rock Mountains") because of the abundance of flint there (which was chipped into arrowheads).

According to Crow Tribe folklore, Little People (a race of 18 in [46 cm]-high dwarf-like people with spiritual powers) lived in these mountains.

== Geology ==
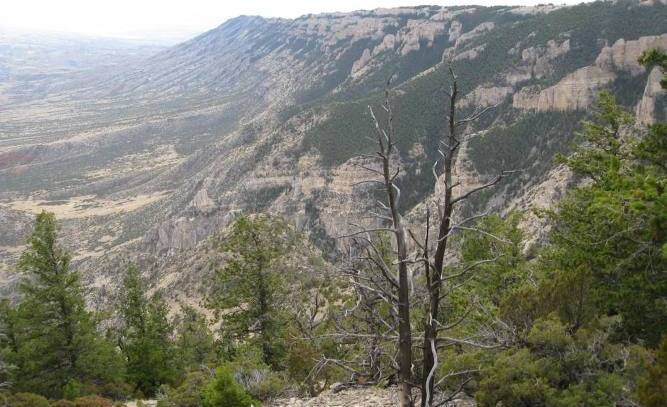
Pryor Mountain terrain

The Pryor Mountains are a 145,000-square-mile (380,000 km^{2}) region of Montana and Wyoming. The Pryor Mountains consists of Paleozoic, Mesozoic and Cenozoic sedimentary rocks the most prominent unit is limestone (known as the Madison Group limestone) laid down about 300 million years ago. The limestone and older sediments rest on Archean metamorphic rock consisting of gneiss and schists. The gneiss is exposed along the northeast escarpment of East Pryor Mountain. During the Laramide orogeny in the Late Cretaceous and Paleogene Period (about 70 to 60 million years ago), the limestone was faulted and uplifted. The 705 to 740 feet (215 to 226 m) thick limestone blocks were tilted and uplifted as large blocks with the northeastern corner of the blocks forming the Bighorn and the Pryor Mountains.

Caves, carved by groundwater, can be found in the limestone throughout the Pryors. Among the better known are Big Ice Cave on the eastern edge of Pryor Mountain, Mystery Cave (which contains some of the best speleothems of all the caves in the Pryors), False Cougar Cave on East Pryor Mountain (which was used by Native Americans at times in the past), Shield Trap Cave (which features a vertical shaft about 33 ft [10 m] deep), Little Ice Cave, and Bell Trap Cave (which is similar to Shield Trap). Other popular features of the Pryors include Froggs Fault, a huge fissure in the earth, and a buffalo jump near Dry Head Lookout. Just below Dry Head Lookout is a small pocket in the cliff face surrounded by a low man-made fence of rock. This is a place used by several Native American tribes for vision quests, and as of 1971 was perhaps the last undisturbed such place in the United States.

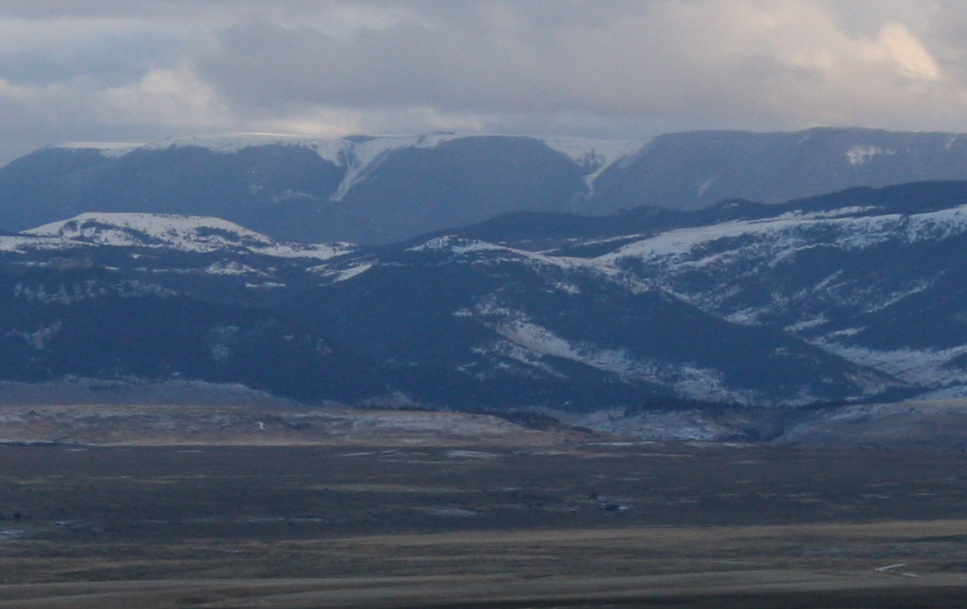
The Pryors from Billings South Hills

The tallest peak in the Pryor Mountains is East Pryor Mountain (elevation 8,822 feet (2,689 m)).

The Bighorn River flows north from Wyoming and through the plateau between the Bighorn and Pryor mountains. The river flows between the two mountain ranges, and has cut the Bighorn Canyon deep into the limestone.

Crooked Creek, one of the few perennial streams in the area, divides the Pryors in two and is one of the few places where Yellowstone cutthroat trout may be found. The Pryors contain the most diverse bat habitat in Montana as well, with 10 species found there.

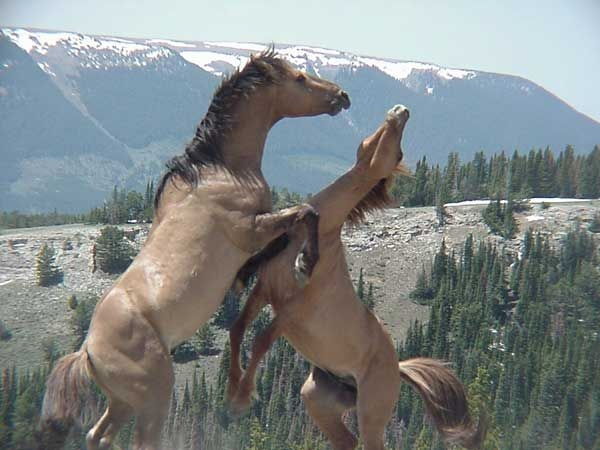
Feral stallions fighting- Pryor Mountain Wild Horse Range - Montana

== Wild horse refuge ==
The Pryor Mountains are also home to the Pryor Mountains Wild Horse Range, a protected area that is home to a herd of free-roaming feral horses. This herd was the subject of the 1995 documentary film Cloud: Wild Stallion of the Rockies and its sequel, the 2003 documentary film Cloud's Legacy: The Wild Stallion Returns.

== See also ==
- List of mountain ranges in Montana

== Bibliography ==
- Aarstad, Rich; Arguimbau, Ellen; Baumler, Ellen; Prosild, Charlene L.; and Shovers, Brian. Montana Place Names From Alzada to Zortman. Helena, Mont.: Montana Historical Society Press, 2009.
- Clawson, Roger and Shandera, Katherine A. Billings: The City and the People. Billings, Mont.: Billings Gazette, 1993.
- Committee on Ungulate Management in Yellowstone National Park, National Research Council. Ecological Dynamics on Yellowstone's Northern Range. Washington, D.C.: National Academy Press, 2002.
- Cruise, David and Griffiths, Alison. Wild Horse Annie and the Last of the Mustangs: The Life of Velma Johnston. New York:Scribner, 2010.
- Frey, Rodney. The World of the Crow Indians: As Driftwood Lodges. Norman, Okla.: University of Oklahoma Press, 1993.
- Gordon, Paul and Krumm, Bob. Bighorn Canyon National Recreation Area. Tucson, Ariz.: Southwest Parks and Monuments Association, 1999.
- Hill, Cherry. Cherry Hill's Horsekeeping Almanac: The Essential Month-by-Month Guide for Everyone Who Keeps or Cares for Horses. North Adams, Mass.: Storey Publishing, 2007.
- Hodges, Montana and Feldman, Robert. Rockhounding Montana. Guiford, Conn.: Globe Pequot Press, 2006.
- Holt, John. Kicking Up Trouble: Upland Bird Hunting in the West. Bozeman, Mont.: Wilderness Adventures Press, 1994.
- Holt, Johnny and Diers, Ginny. Coyote Nowhere: In Search of America's Last Frontier. Guilford, Conn.: Lyons Press, 2004.
- Lopez, David A., Geologic Map of the Bridger 30' x 60' Quadrangle, Montana, Montana Bureau of Mines and Geology, Geologic Map Series No. 58, 2000 with the U.S. Geological Survey
- Massingham, Rhonda. Among Wild Horses: A Portrait of the Pryor Mountain Mustangs. North Adams, Mass.: Storey Publishing, 2006.
- McRae, W.C. and Jewell, Judy. Montana. Berkeley, Calif.: Avalon Travel, 2009.
- Montgomery, M.R. Many Rivers to Cross: Of Good Running Water, Native Trout, and the Remains of Wilderness. New York: Simon and Schuster, 1996.
- Rowles, Genevieve. Adventure Guide to Montana. Edison, N.J.: Hunter Publishing, 2000.
- Saindon, Robert A. Explorations Into the World of Lewis and Clark. Great Falls, Mont.: Lewis and Clark Trail Heritage Foundation, 2003.
- Voight, Barry and Voight, Mary Anne. Rock Mechanics, the American Northwest. University Park, Pa.: Pennsylvania State University, 1974.
