= Cultural depictions of dogs =

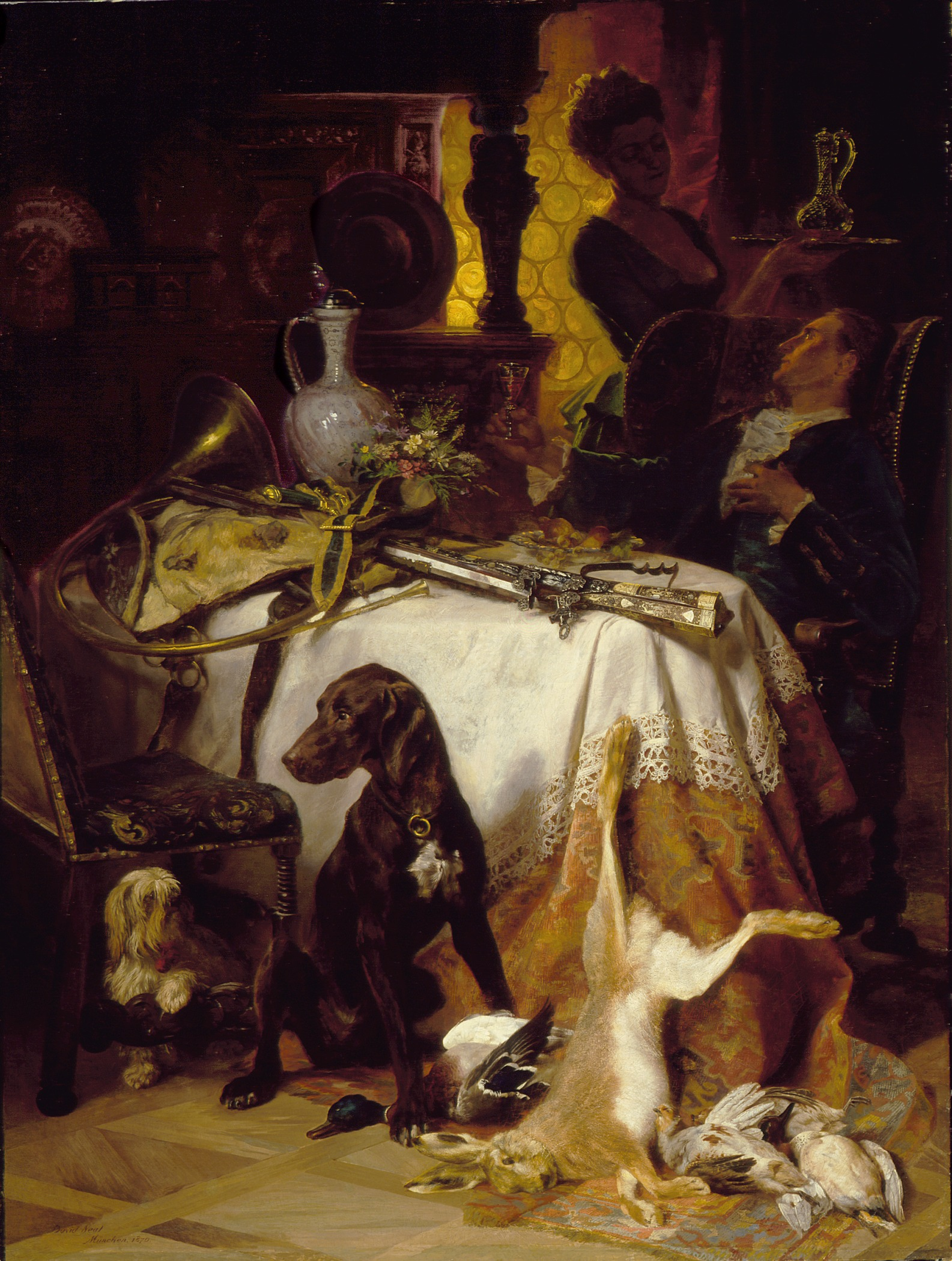
After the hunt, 1870, by David Neal (1838–1915)

Cultural depictions of dogs in art have become more elaborate as individual breeds evolved and the relationships between human and canine developed. Hunting scenes were popular in the Middle Ages and the Renaissance. Dogs were depicted to symbolize guidance, protection, loyalty, fidelity, faithfulness, alertness, and love.

As dogs became more domesticated, they were shown as companion animals, often painted sitting on a lady's lap. Throughout art history, mainly in Western art, there is an overwhelming presence of dogs as status symbols and pets in painting. The dogs were brought to houses and were allowed to live in the house. They were cherished as part of the family, and were regarded highly by the upper classes, who used them for hunting and could afford to feed them. Hunting dogs were generally connected to the aristocracy. Only the nobility were allowed to keep hunting dogs, and this would signal status.

Dogs are unusual in Christian religious art, but the New Testament subject of the Exorcism of the Syrophoenician woman's daughter and the Old Testament one of Tobias and the Angel are exceptions, as they are mentioned in the texts, and depictions often include them.

Dog portraits became increasingly popular in the 18th century, and the establishment of The Kennel Club in the United Kingdom of Great Britain and Ireland in 1873, and the American Kennel Club in 1884 introduced breed standards or 'word pictures', which further encouraged the popularity of dog portraiture.

== Early history ==
There are illustrations of dogs on the walls of tombs dating back to the Bronze Age, as well as statues, children's toys, and ceramics depicting dogs. Hunting dogs are commonly portrayed. One of the prehistoric paintings estimated to be 9,000 years old found at the Bhimbetka rock shelters in India depict a dog held on a leash by a man. Rock art of Tassili n'Ajjer also include depictions that are highly suggestive of dogs.

The Ancient Greeks and Romans, contrary to the Semitic cultures, favored dogs as pets, valuing them for their faithfulness and courage; they were often seen on Greek and Roman reliefs and ceramics as symbols of fidelity. Dogs were given as gifts among lovers and kept as pets, guardians, and for hunting. Dogs were appreciated by the Greeks for their faith and love. Homer's Odyssey tells the story of Odysseus, who raised a dog called Argos, and who was the only one that recognized him when he returned home after his travels, disguised to conceal his appearance. This theme has been often depicted in ancient Greek vases.

The ancient Romans kept three types of dogs: hunting dogs, especially sighthounds; Molossus dogs like the Neapolitan Mastiff, often depicted in reliefs and mosaics with the words "Cave Canem"; and small companion dogs like the Maltese, used as women's lap dogs. Greyhounds were often represented as sculptures. Large dogs were used in war by the Roman army, arranged in attack formation, or for wolf-hunting on horseback, which was a popular sport.

Anatolian hieroglyphs have two symbols for dogs: 𔑬 𔑭. Egyptian hieroglyphs have several: 𓃡 𓃢 𓃣 𓃤.

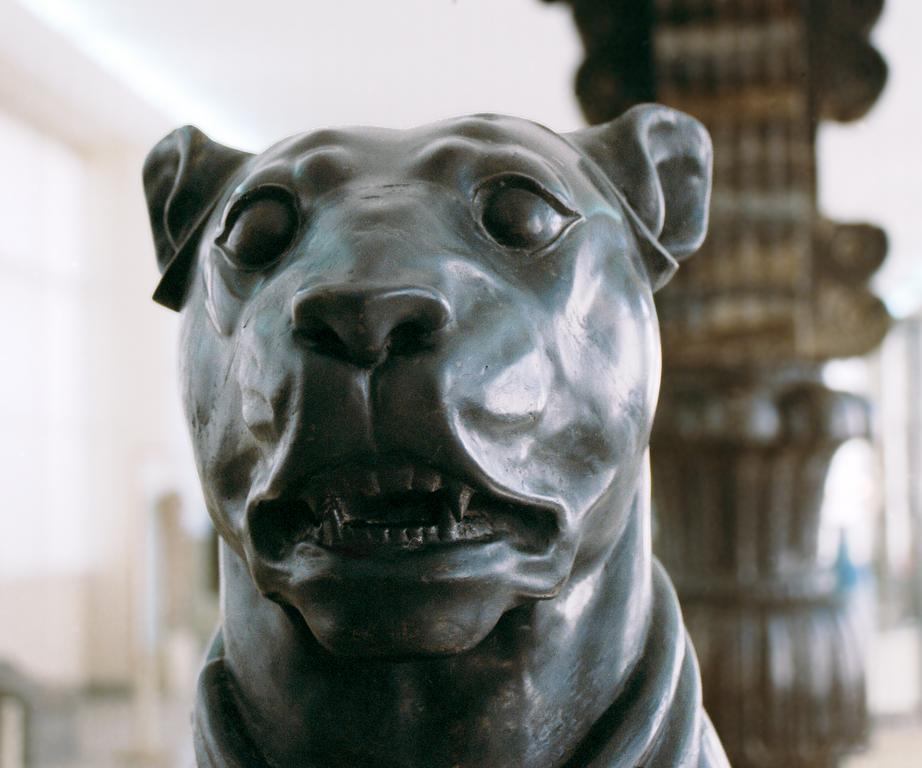
Statue of a dog from the southeast tower of the Apadana in Persepolis, National Museum of Iran, Tehran.

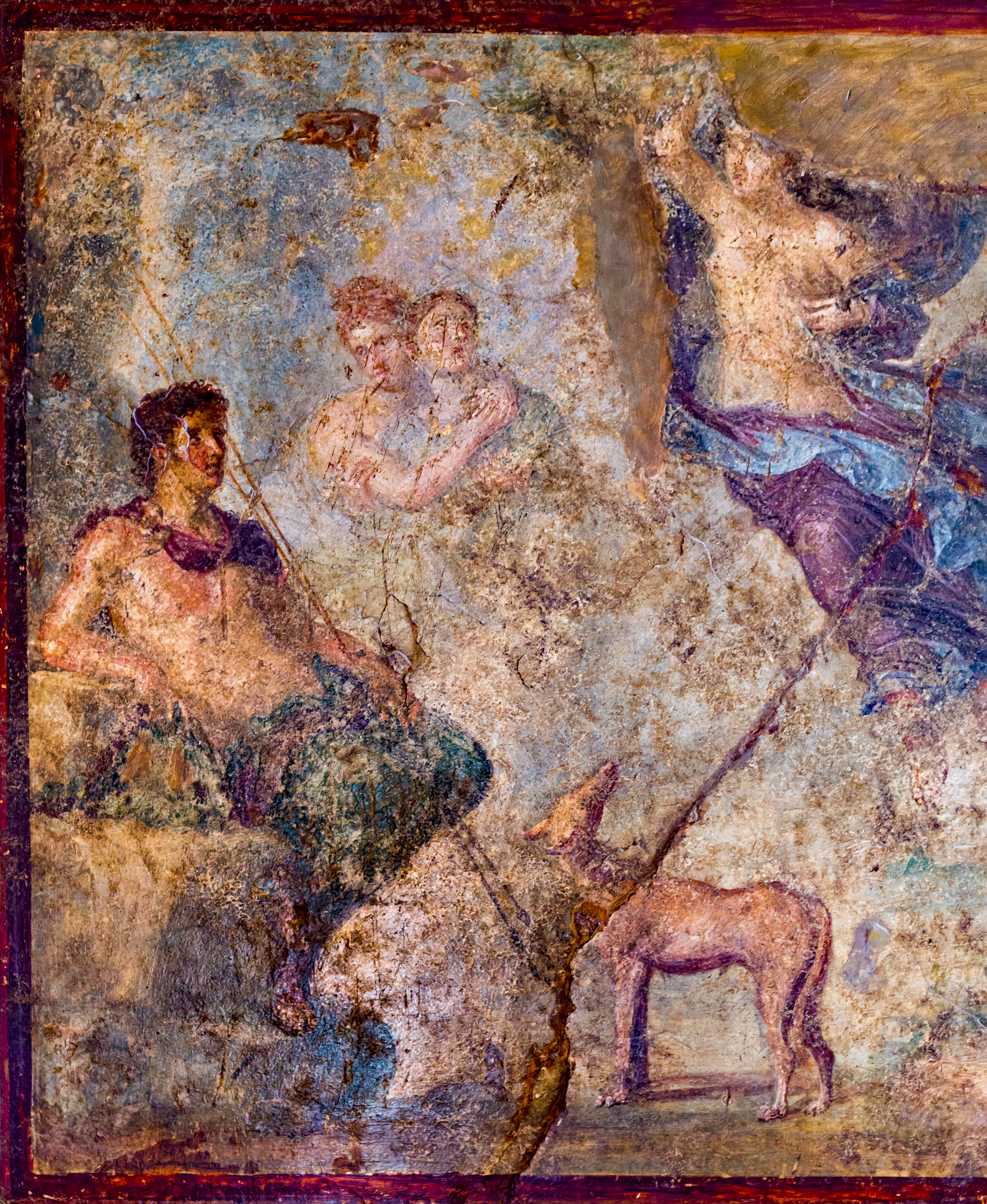
Painting, Endymion and Selene with a dog, "House of the Dioscuri", Pompeii

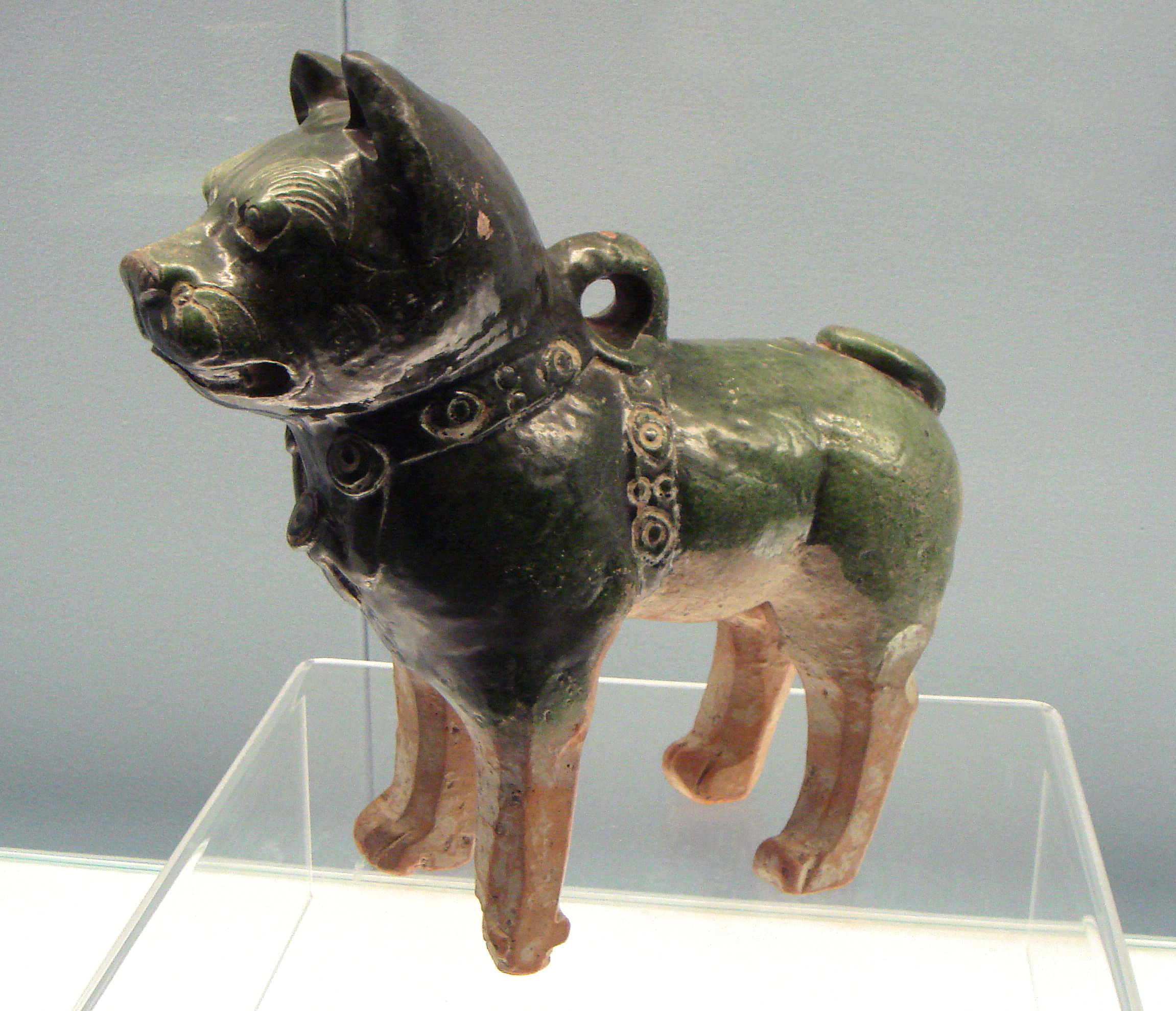
Glazed ceramic dog, collar patterned onto the surface; Eastern Han, 1st century CE.

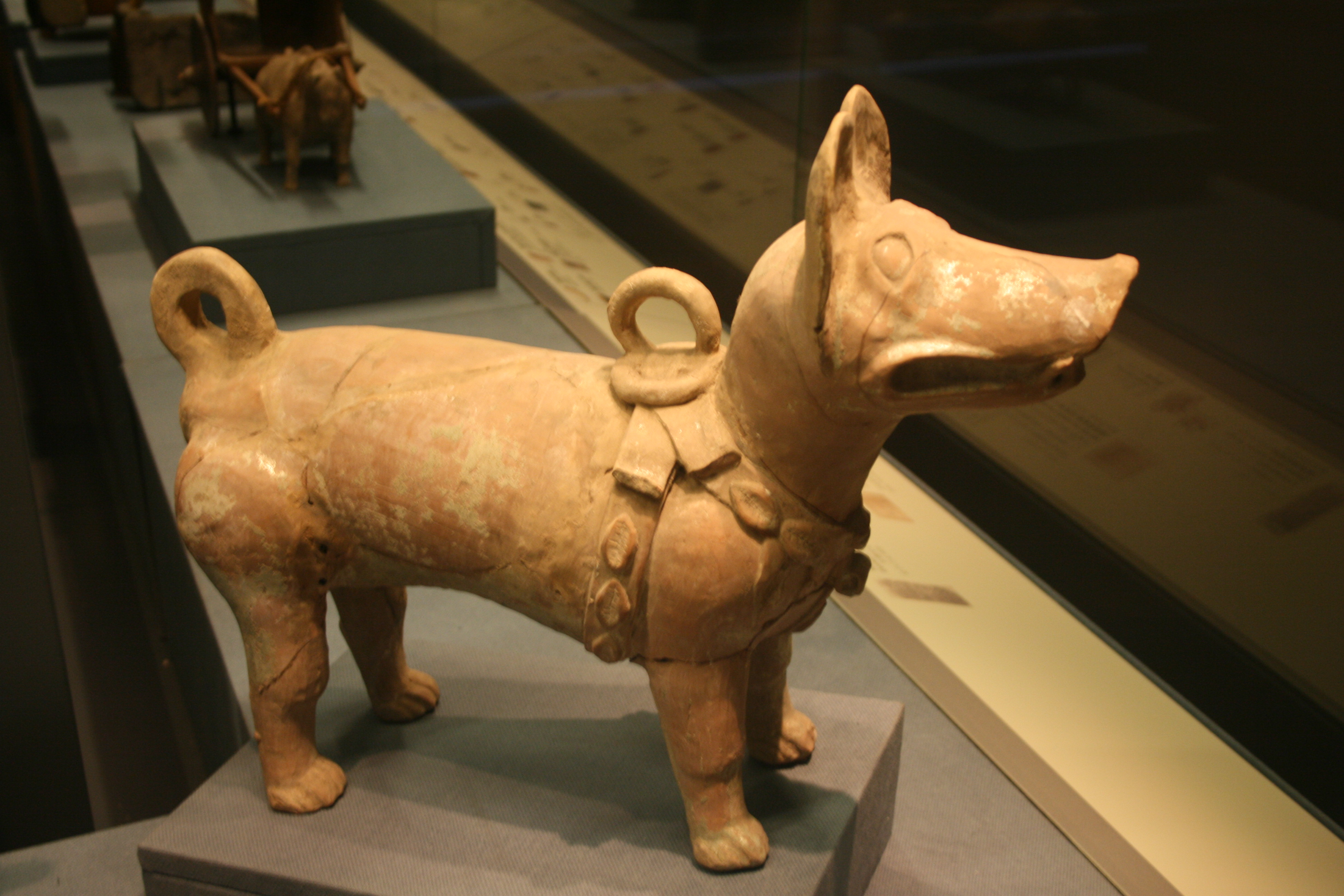
Han dynasty terracotta dog, tomb figurine, 1st century BCE.

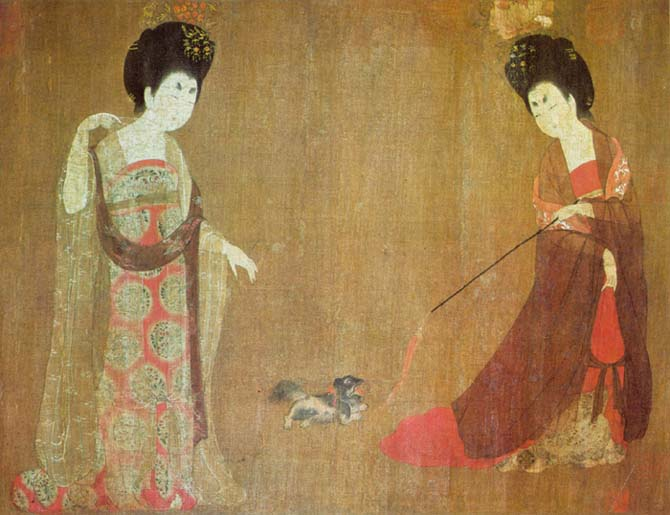
Court ladies playing with a small dog, Beauties Wearing Flowers by Tang dynasty painter Zhou Fang

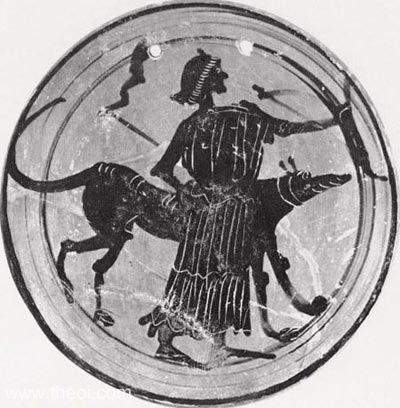
Image of a goddess identified as Hecate or Artemis alongside a dog (Archaic Greece)

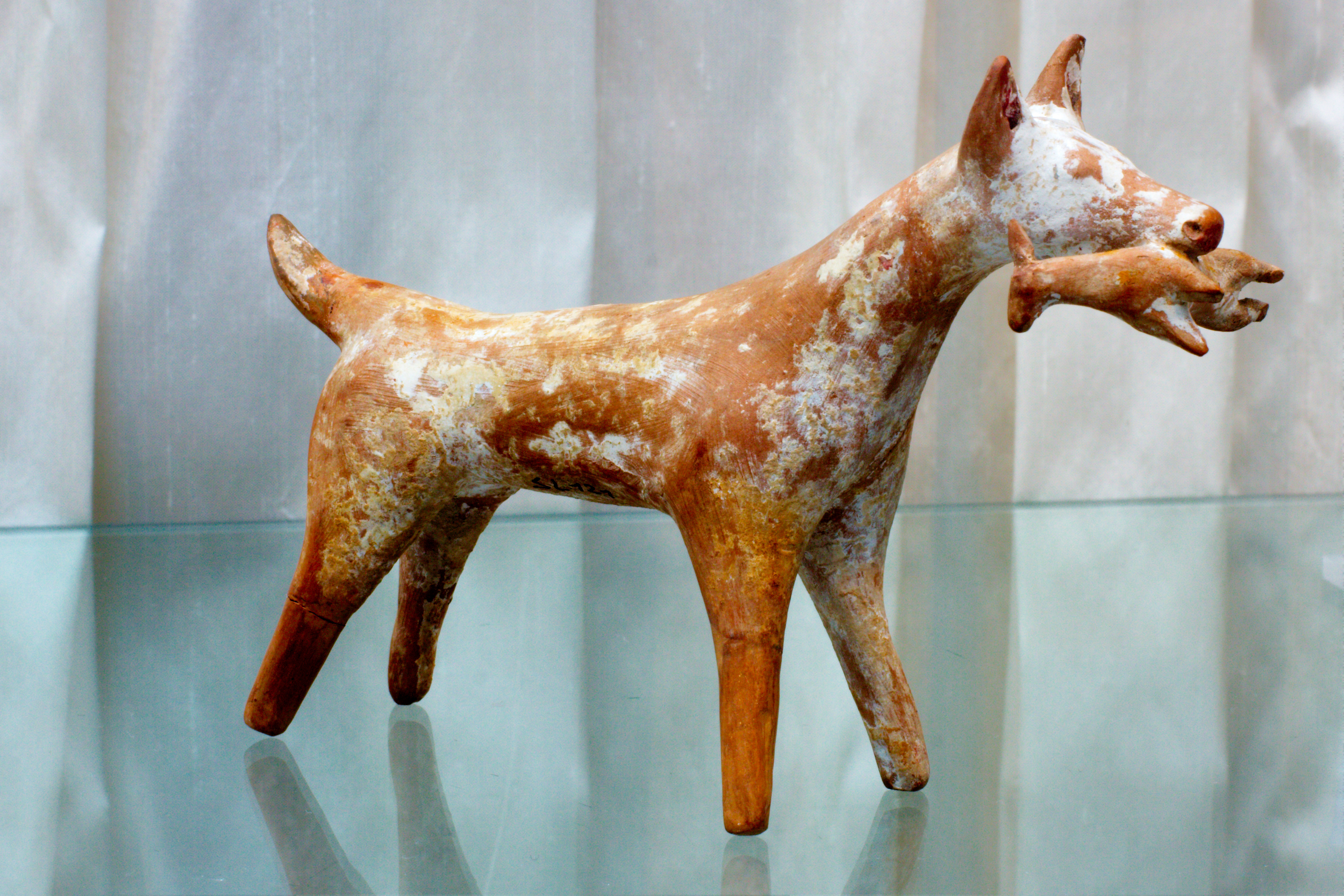
Greek terracotta statue dog with puppy

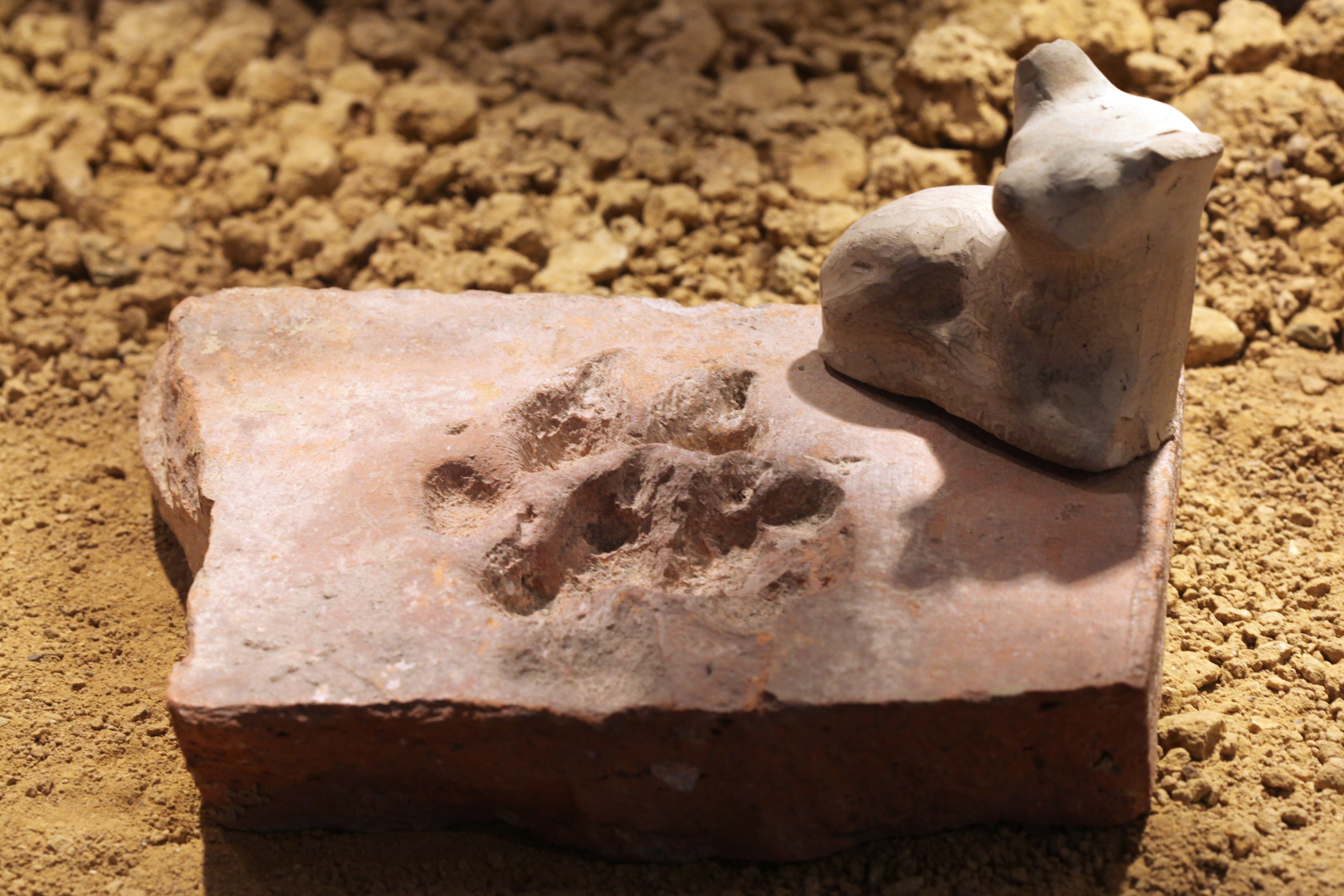
A pet dog's footprint and small sculpture on a Roman terracotta

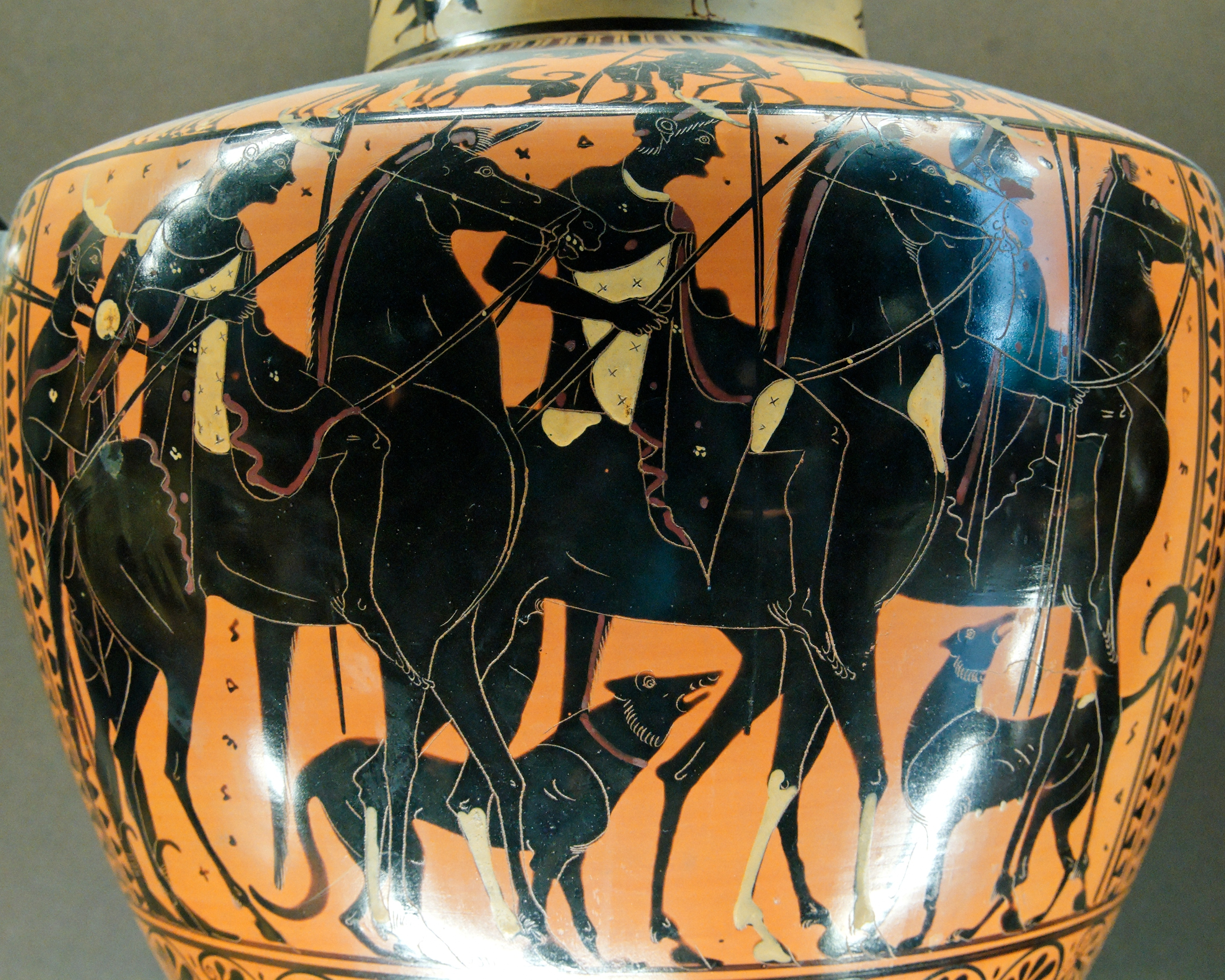
Riders and dogs. Ancient Greek Attic black-figure hydria, ca. 510–500 BC, from Vulci. Louvre Museum, Paris.

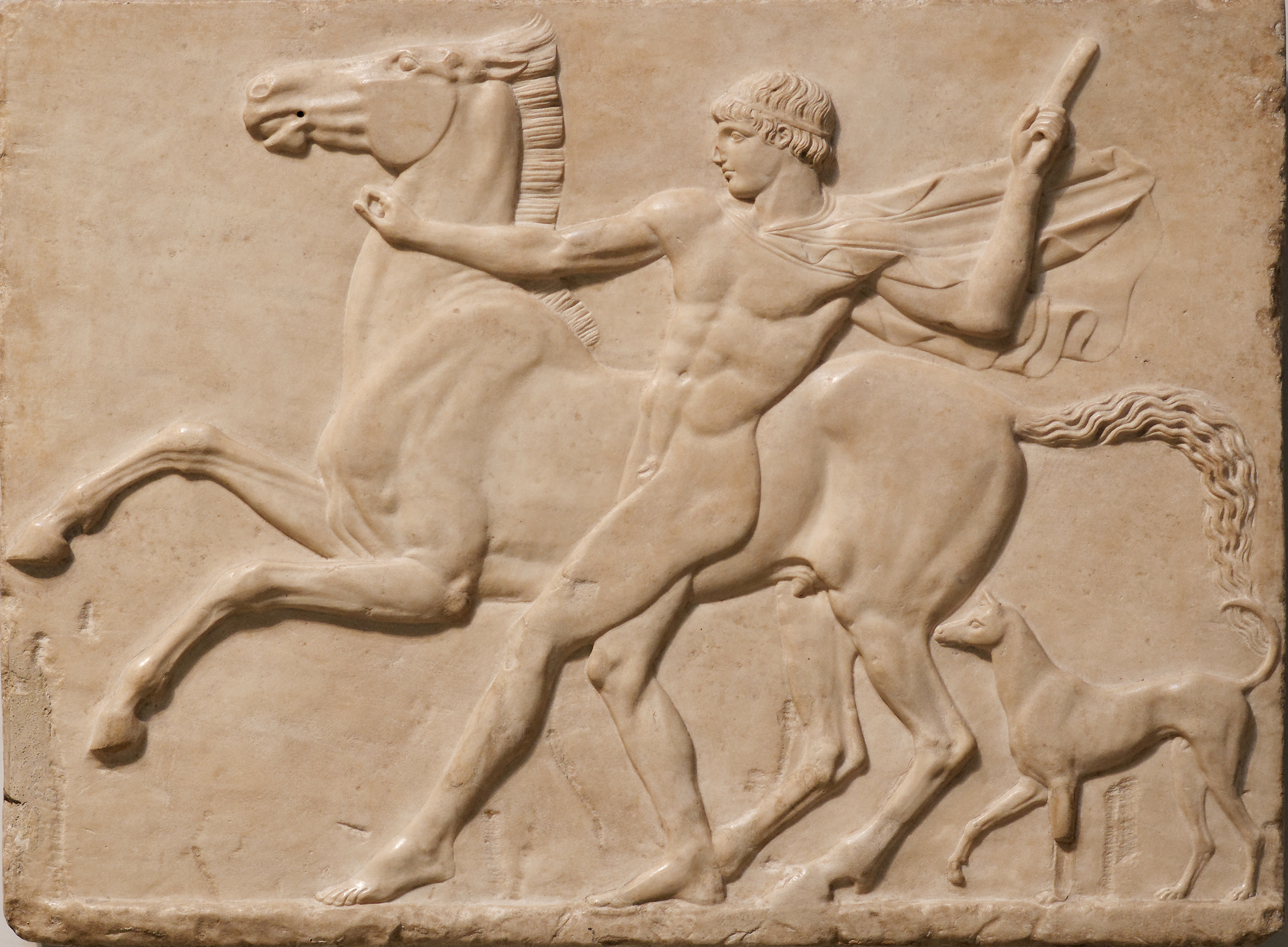
Roman artwork inspired by Greek classical models, ca. 125 AD. From the Villa Adriana, near Tivoli.

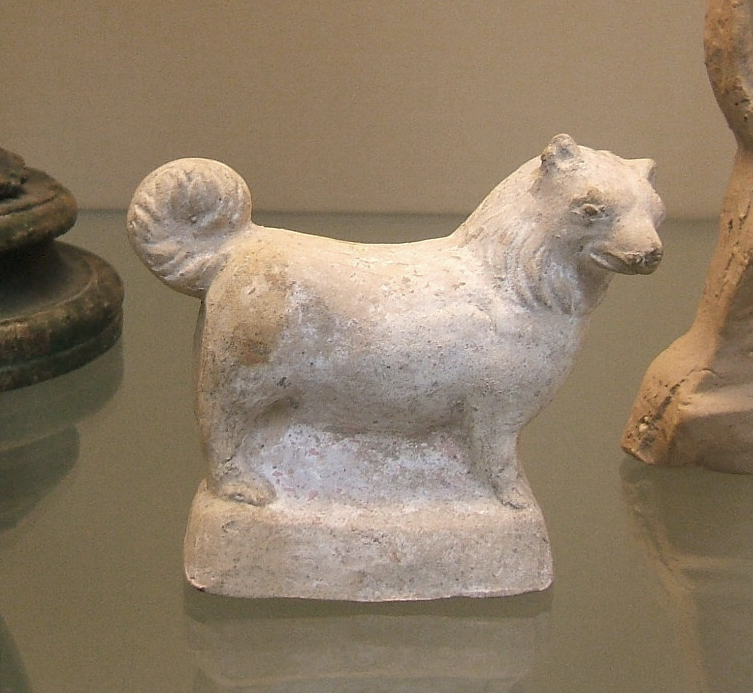
Roman terracotta dog

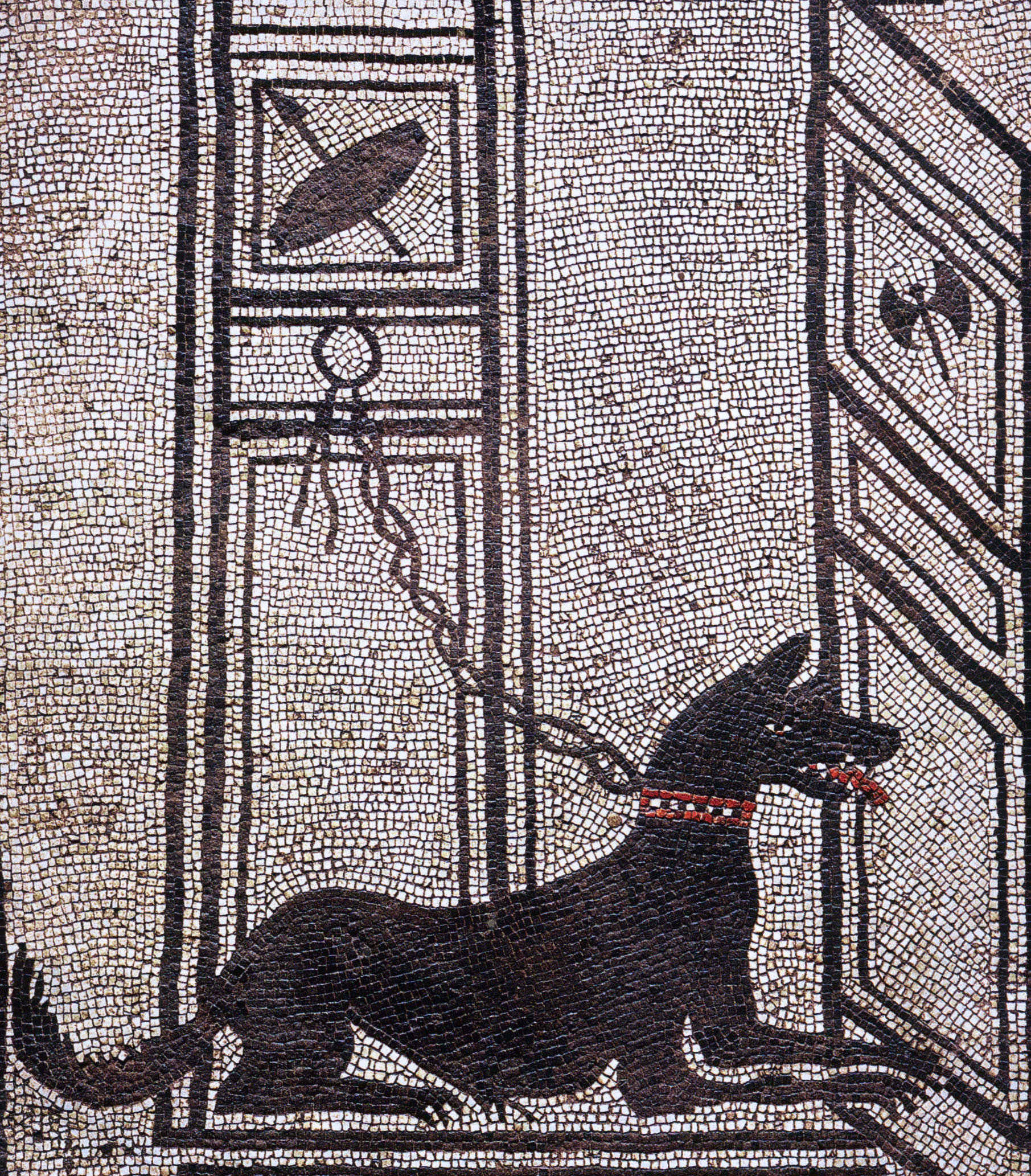
Cave canem! Watchdog from the House of Paquius Proculus, Pompeii

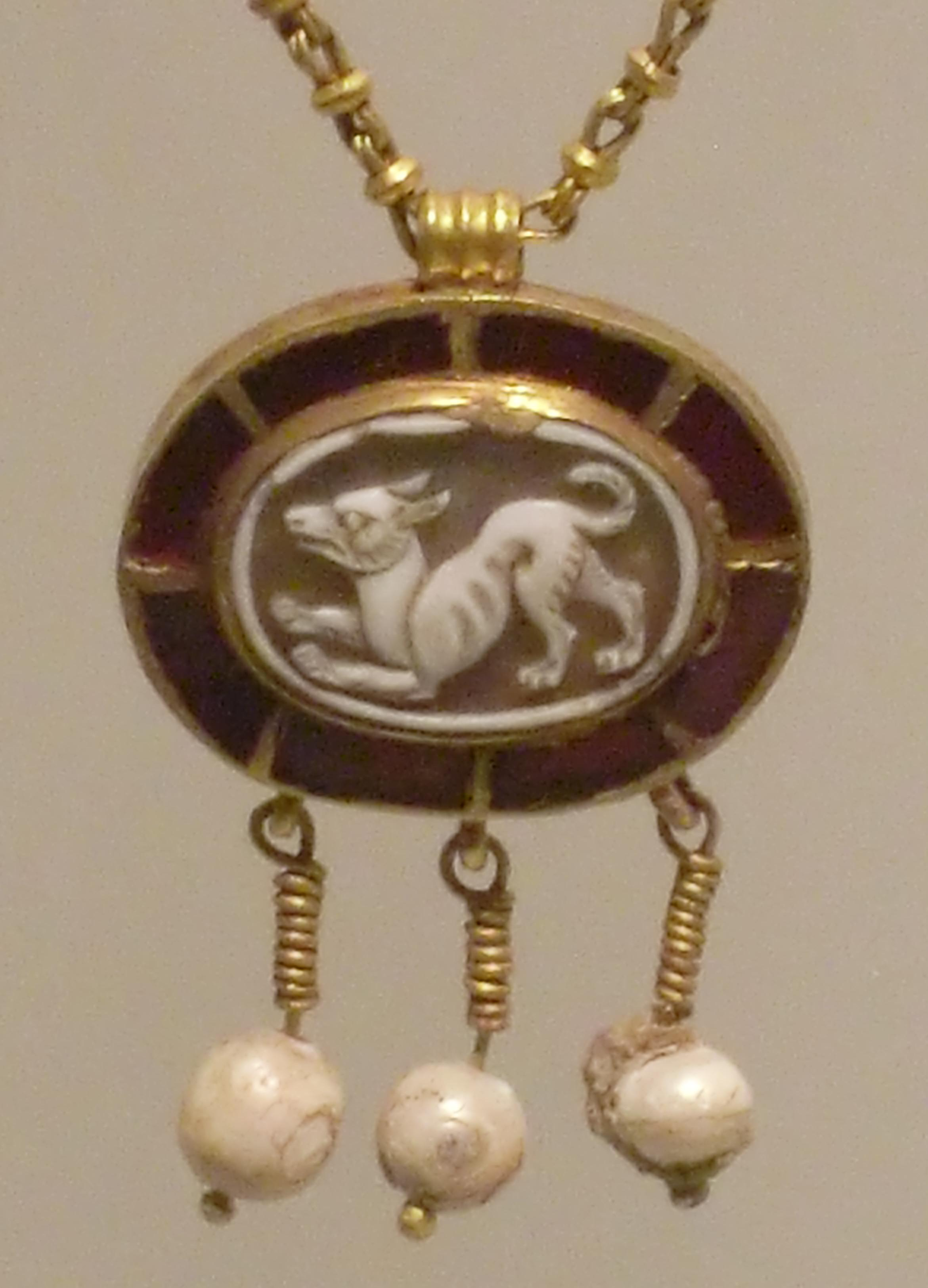
Roman cameo of dog

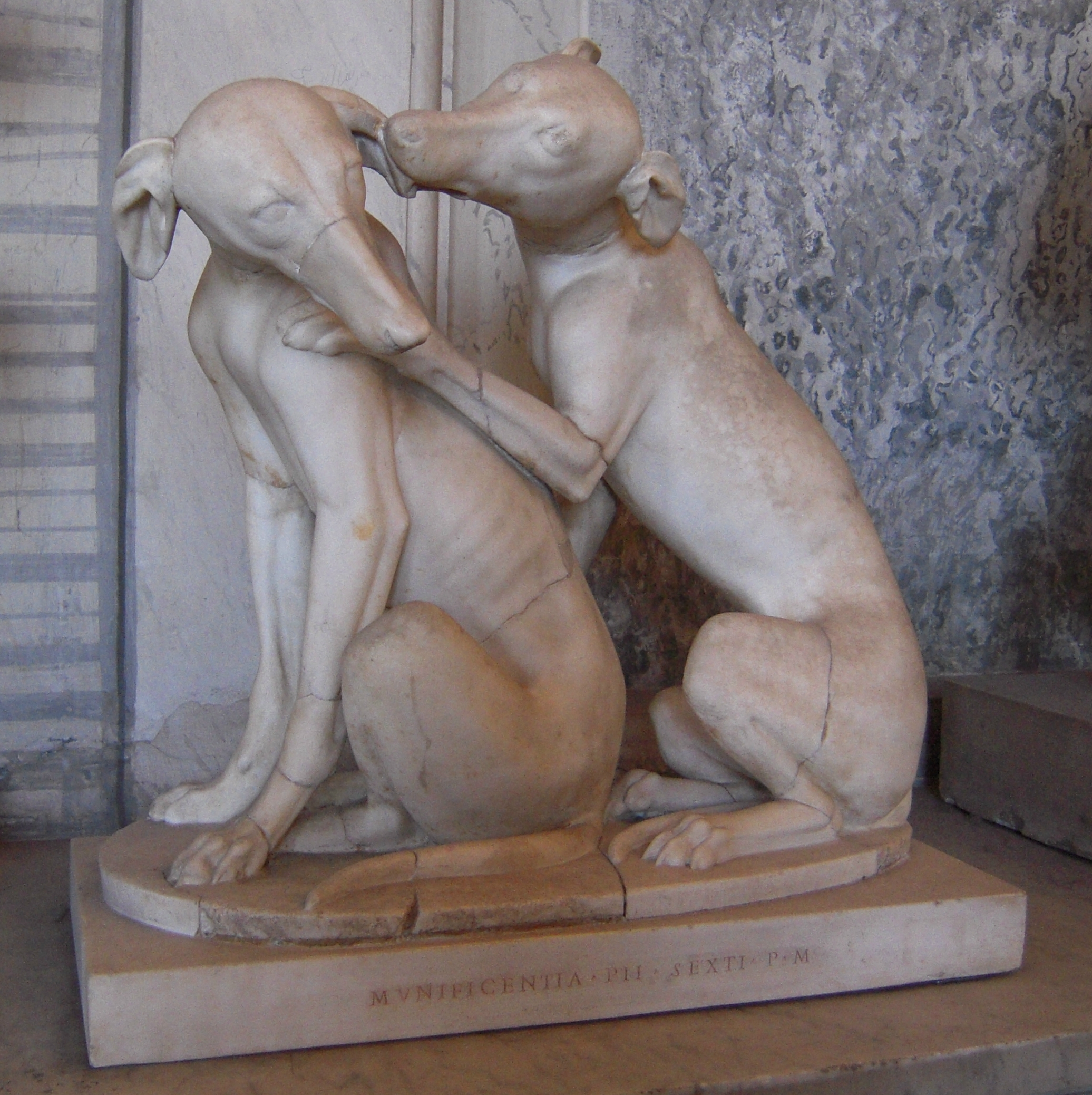
Statue of Roman sight-hounds

== Middle Ages ==
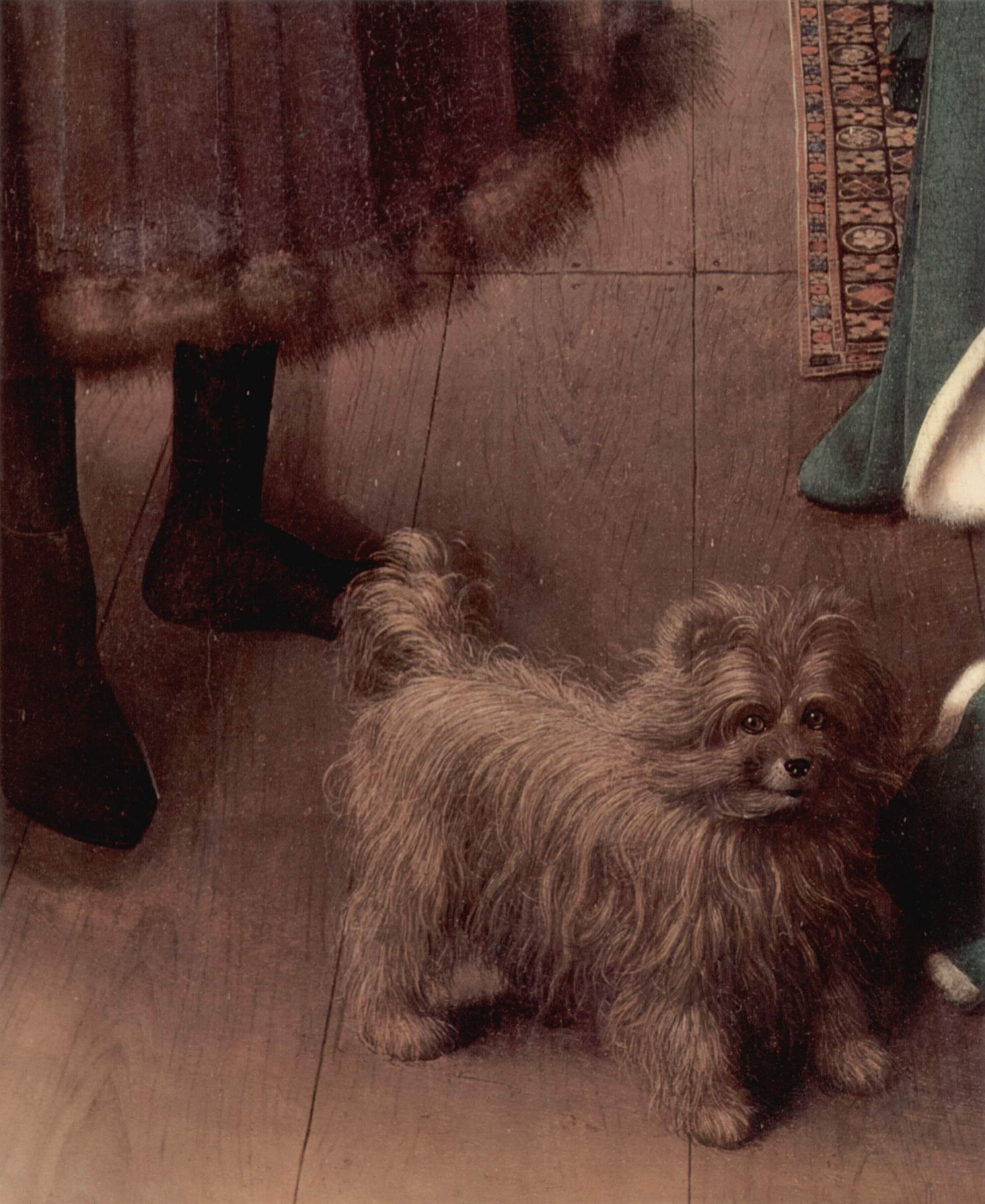
Detail of the dog

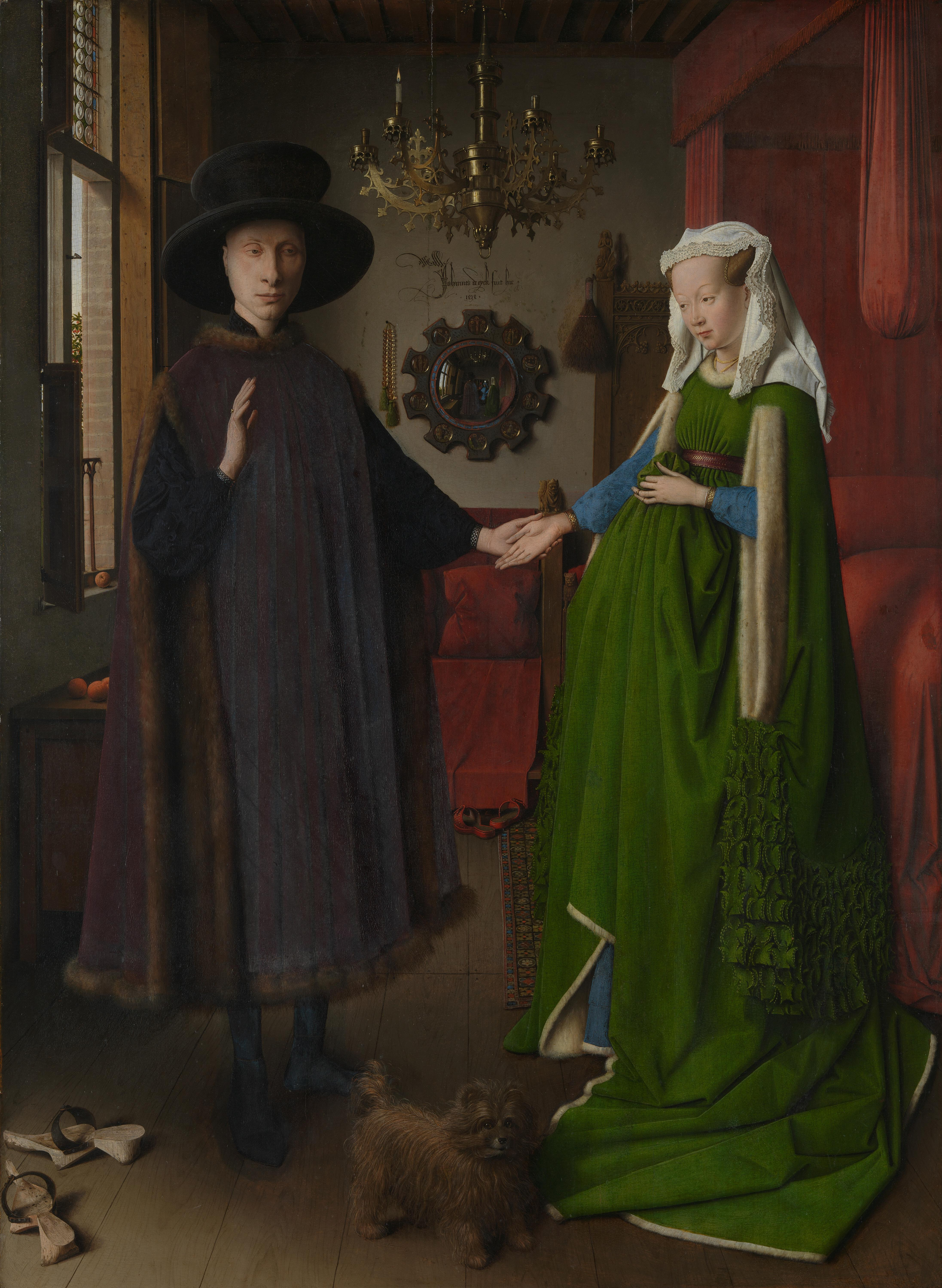
Jan van Eyck's The Arnolfini Wedding (1434).

Generally, dogs symbolize faith and loyalty. A dog, when included in an allegorical painting, portrays the attribute of fidelity personified. In a portrait of a married couple, a dog placed in a woman's lap or at her feet can represent marital fidelity. If the portrait is of a widow, a dog can represent her continuing faithfulness to the memory of her late husband.

An example of a dog representing marital fidelity is present in Jan van Eyck's Arnolfini Portrait. An oil painting on oak panel dated 1434 by the Early Netherlandish painter Jan van Eyck, it is a small full-length double portrait, which is believed to represent the Italian merchant Giovanni di Nicolao Arnolfini and his wife, presumably in their home in the Flemish city of Bruges. The little dog symbolizes faithfulness, devotion or loyalty, or can be seen as an emblem of lust, signifying the couple's desire to have a child. Unlike the couple, the dog looks out to meet the gaze of the viewer. The dog could also be simply a lap dog, a gift from husband to wife. Many wealthy women in the court had lap dogs as companions, reflecting wealth or social status. During the Middle Ages, images of dogs were often carved on tombstones to represent the deceased's feudal loyalty or marital fidelity.

=== Hunting scenes ===
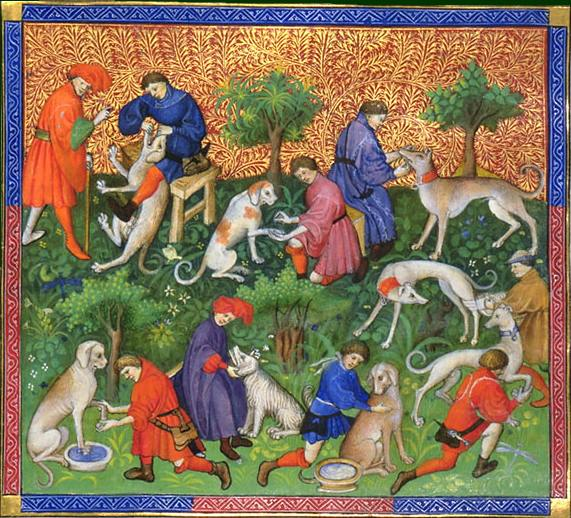
Livre de Chasse, French hunting dog book

Hunting scenes were common topics in medieval and Renaissance art. Hunting in the medieval period was a sport exclusive to the aristocracy, and hunting was an essential part of court etiquette. Depictions of people with a hunting dog, hawks or falcons would signal status. Hunting dogs were connected to aristocracy, as only the nobility was allowed to hunt. Different breeds of dogs were used for different types of hunting. Hunting with dogs was so popular during the Middle Ages that wild bears were hunted to extinction in England.

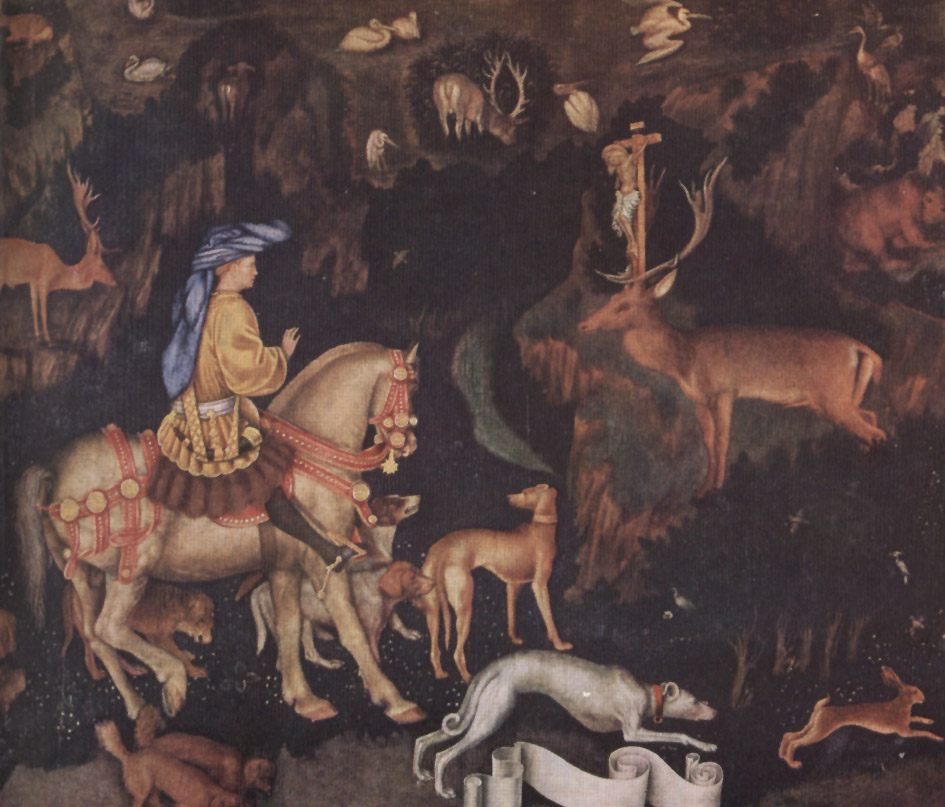
Pisanello (1395–1455), hunting scene with dogs (The Vision of St. Eustachius)

Hunting dogs are seldom seen depicted in the company of clerics, due to a prohibition of the activity decreed by the Fourth Council of the Lateran, held under Pope Innocent III.

=== In heraldry ===
Coats of arms of the House of Tudor

Coats of arms of the Hungarian town Ebes

Coat of arms of the former Finnish municipality Tottijärvi

As the aristocracy often used hunting dogs, dogs were shown as symbols in heraldry. In the late Middle Ages and the Renaissance, heraldry became a highly developed discipline. Dogs of various types, and occasionally of specific breeds, occur as charges and supporters in many coats of arms, and often symbolise courage, vigilance, loyalty, and fidelity.

Three encaustic tiles dating from the 15th century feature a white hound, the Talbot crest and the inscription "Sir John Talbot" (the 1st Earl of Shrewsbury). Part of a set of four, the tiles were possibly originally used on a church floor. The term "Talbot" is used in heraldry to refer to a good-mannered hunting dog. The Talbot dog always depicts the Talbot coat of arms and is the original hound used as an English heraldic symbol. It is portrayed in the family arms of several noble German families and at least seven other English families.

The greyhound also features very often in British heraldry, and appears on the arms of several English and Scottish families. One family used a winged greyhound for its crest. Other breeds used less often in heraldry include mastiffs, bloodhounds, and foxhounds. A creature referred to as the sea-dog is also used, and resembles the Talbot with scales, webbed paws, a fin along its back, and a flat, beaver-like tail. The English heraldist Arthur Charles Fox-Davies believed the sea-dog to have originated from depictions of the beaver, citing as evidence that one of the supporters in the arms of Oxford, which strongly resembles the sea-dog, is officially recorded as being a beaver.

== 16th and 17th century ==
Shakespeare may have disliked dogs, as the many references in his works are rather derogatory, many mentioning different breeds. Spaniels seem especially disliked, for fawning and slobbering. On the other hand Titian, who included dogs of several different breeds in his paintings, seems to show them in a good light.

During the 16th and 17th century, dogs were depicted in hunting scenes, representing social status, as a lap dog, or sometimes as a personal friend. They were also used as symbols in painting. The Greek philosopher Diogenes (404–323 BC) was depicted by Jean-Léon Gérôme in the company of dogs, serving as emblems of his "Cynic" (Greek: "kynikos," dog-like) philosophy, which emphasized an austere existence. Diogenes stated that "Unlike human beings who either dupe others or are duped, dogs will give an honest bark at the truth. Other dogs bite their enemies, I bite my friends to save them."

In the painting Portrait of a man writing at a table by the Dutch painter Hendrik Martenszoon Sorgh, a Protestant preacher and theologian, with the Bible opened on the table, is depicted with his dog. The dog represents fidelity, vigilance, and regularity in research, owing to the perceived natural intelligence and intuition of a dog.

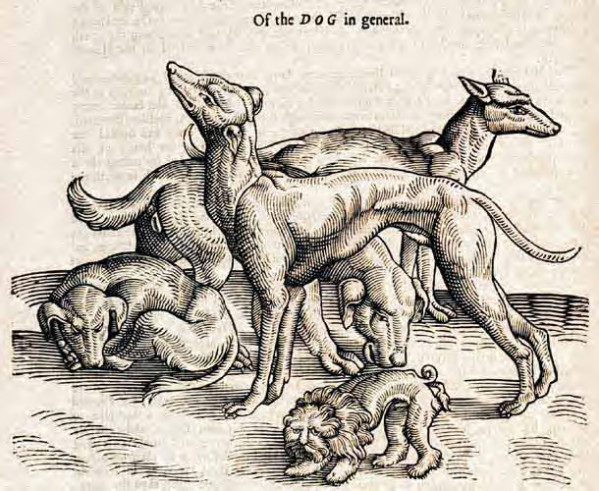
A woodcut illustration from The history of four-footed beasts and serpents by Edward Topsell, 1658

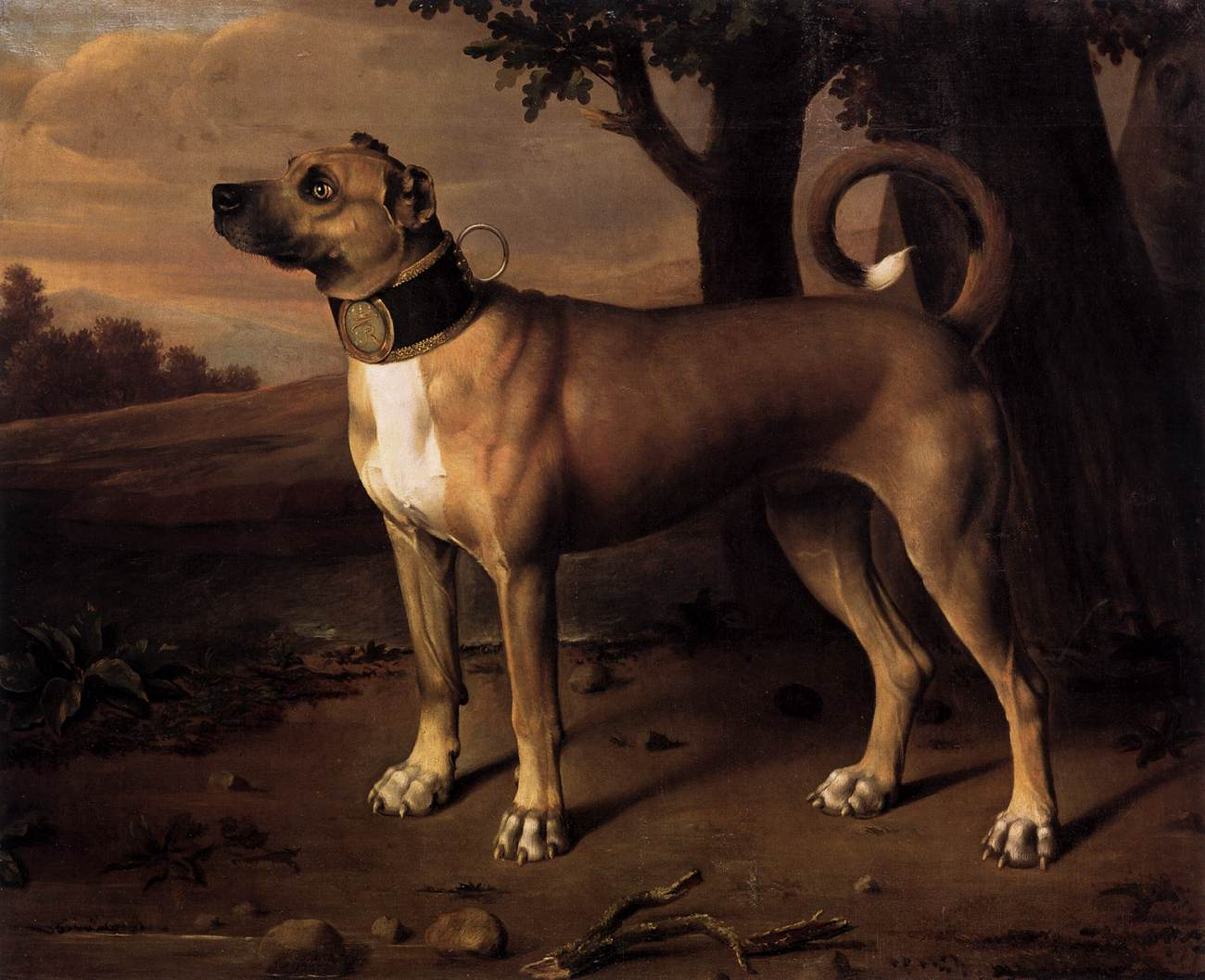
Johann Christof Merck, dog with a collar, 1705

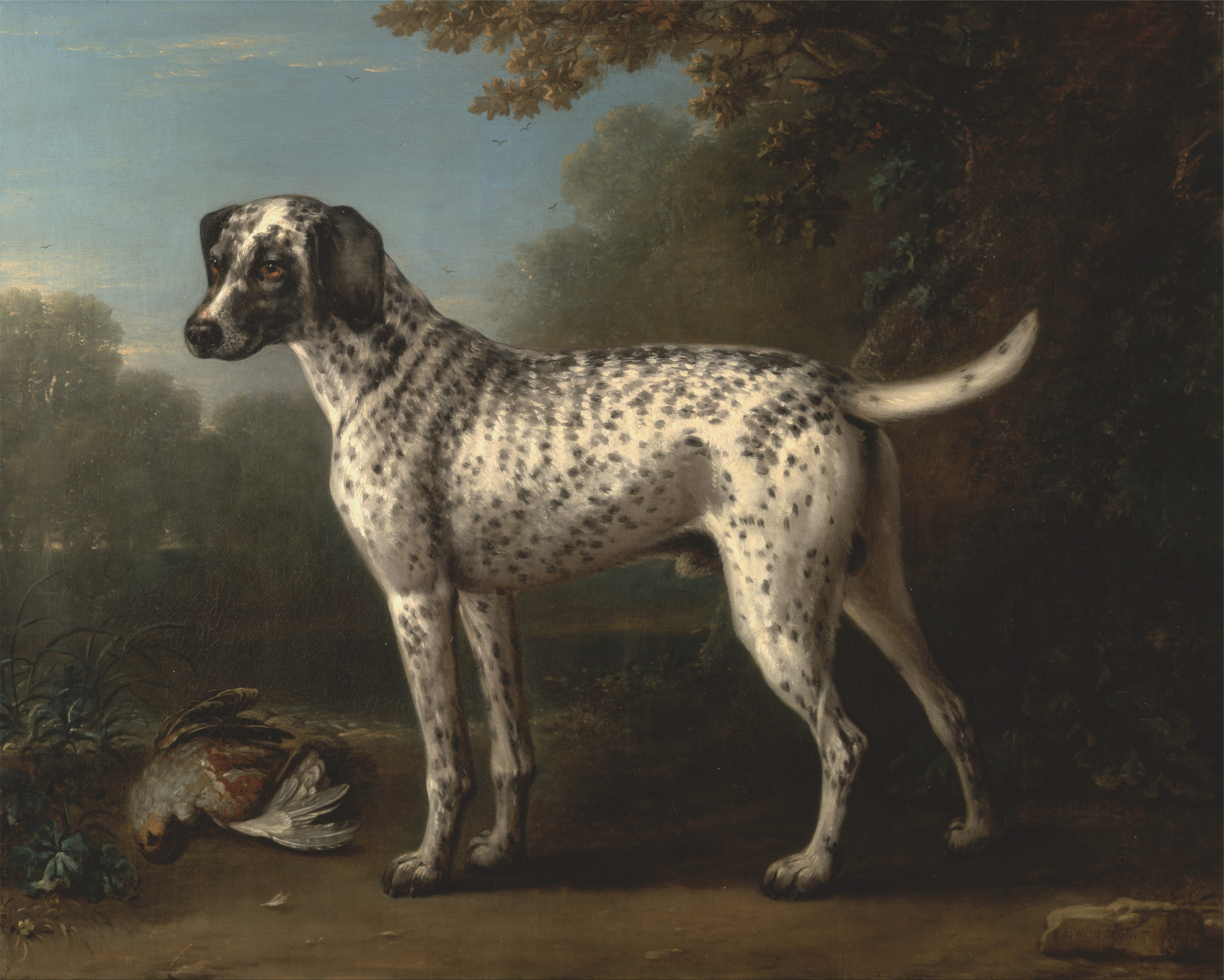
John Wootton (1682–1764) A Grey Spotted Hound

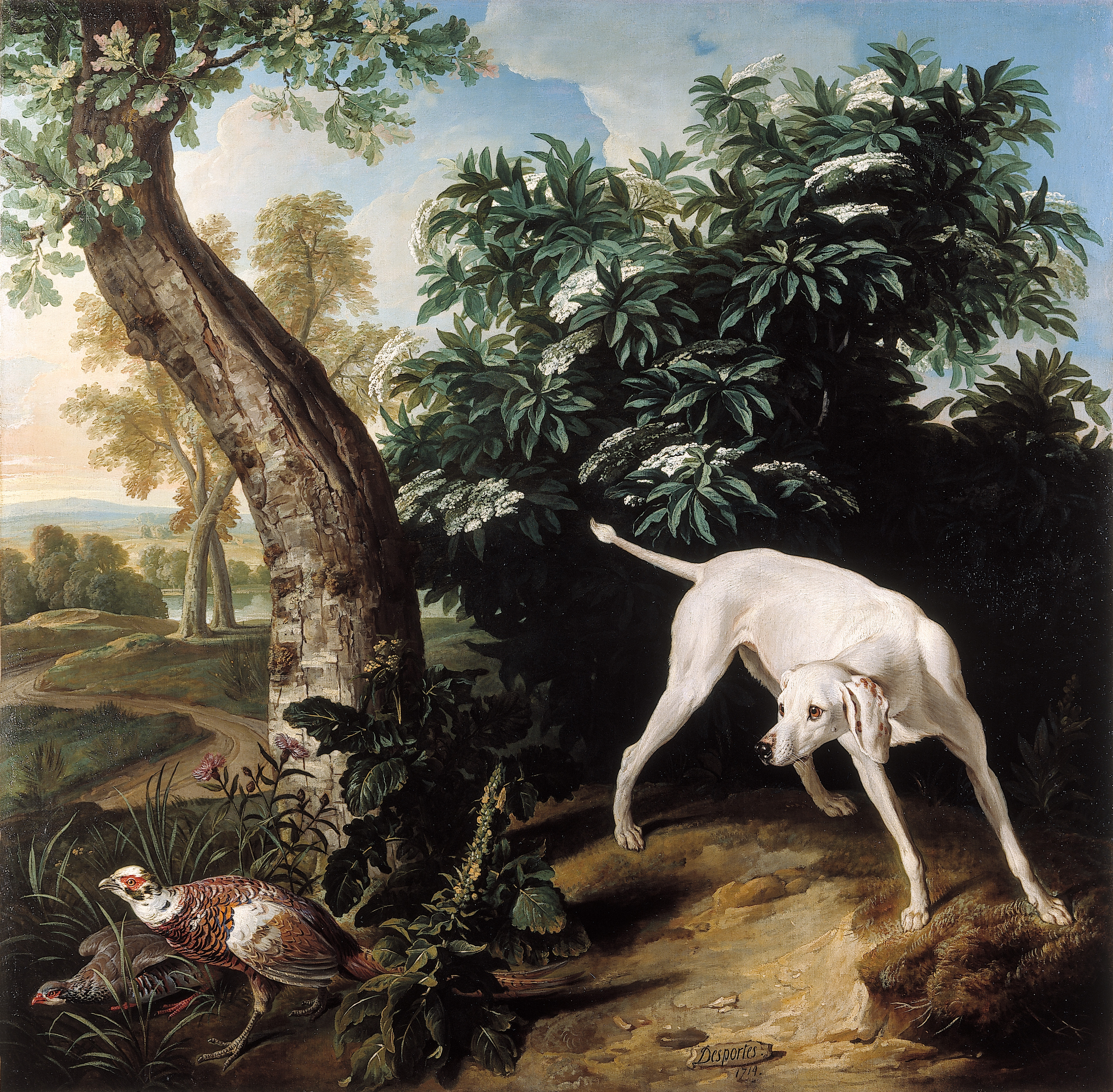
White dog by Alexandre-François Desportes (1661–1743)

The Night Watch by Rembrandt, 1642

== 18th century ==
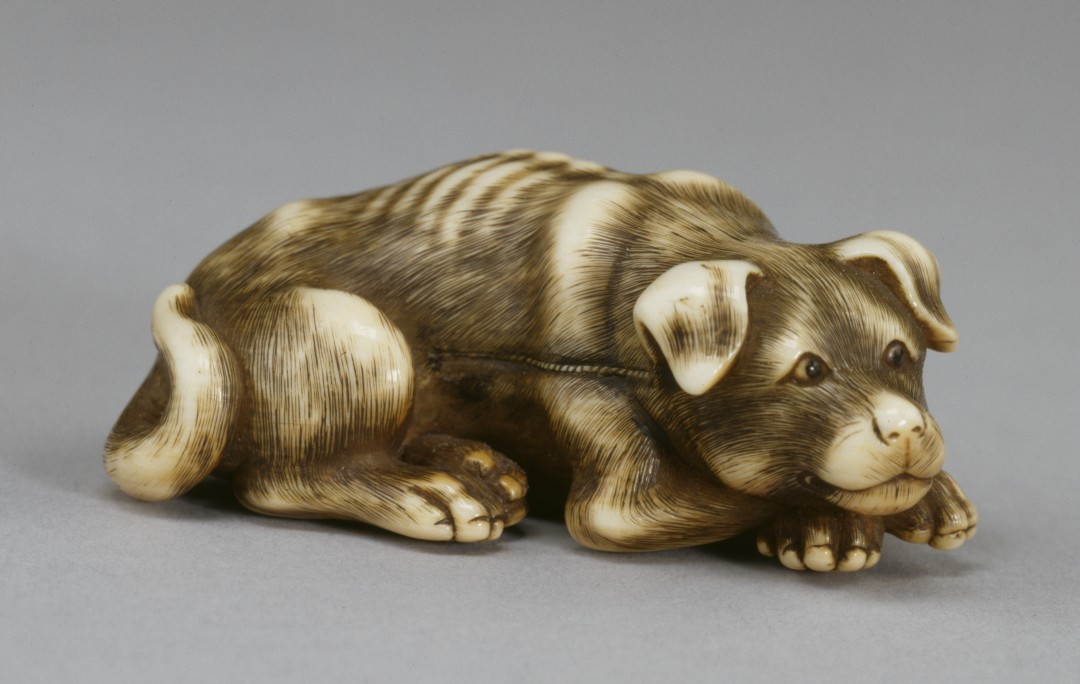
Netsuke in the Form of a Dog

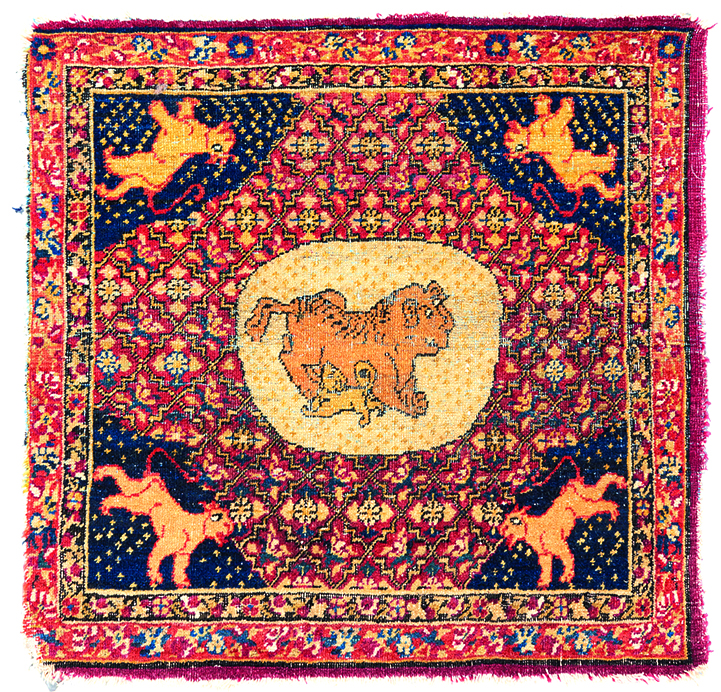
Foo dog mat, Xinjiang, 18th century

Netsuke are Japanese miniature sculptures of great artistic merit that also serve a practical function as toggles for cords used to attach small objects, boxes, or pouches to kimono, which traditionally have no pockets. Most netsuke production was during 1615–1868, in the Edo period in Japan. Among other motifs, netsuke often depicted dogs. The tradition of showing dogs in hunting scenes continued to the 18th century.

== 19th and 20th century ==
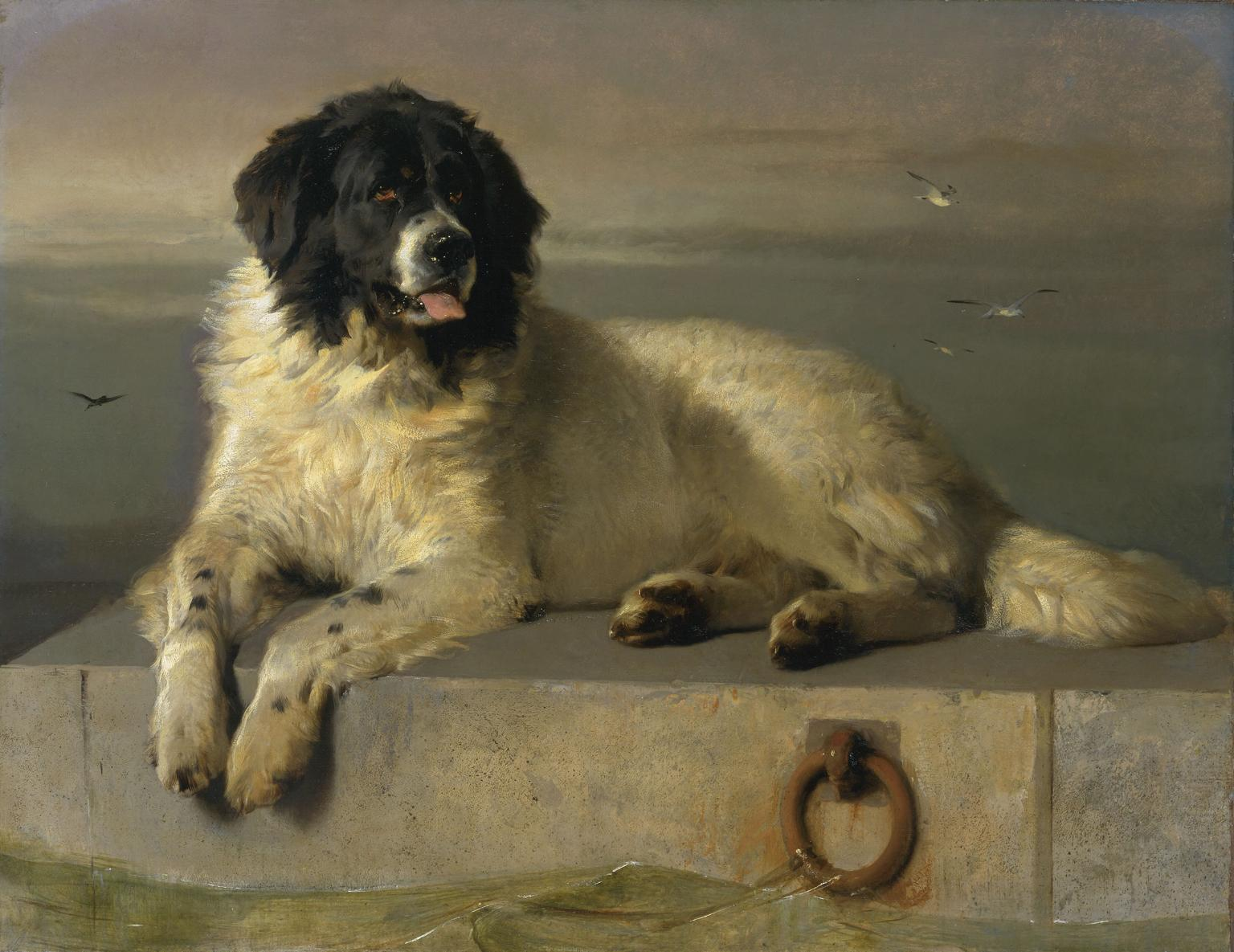
A Distinguished Member of the Humane Society by Sir Edwin Landseer

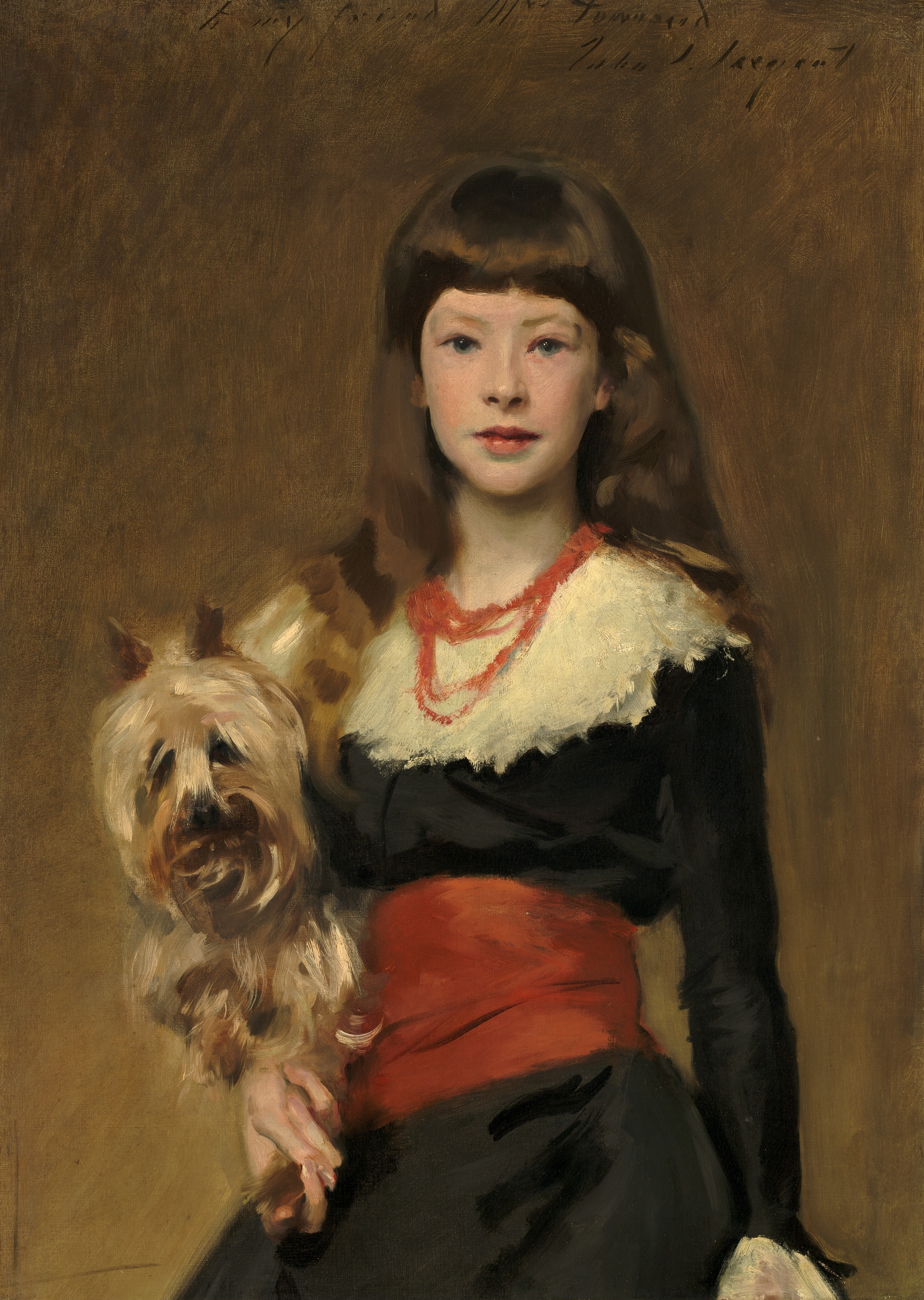
Miss Beatrice Townsend by John Singer Sargent

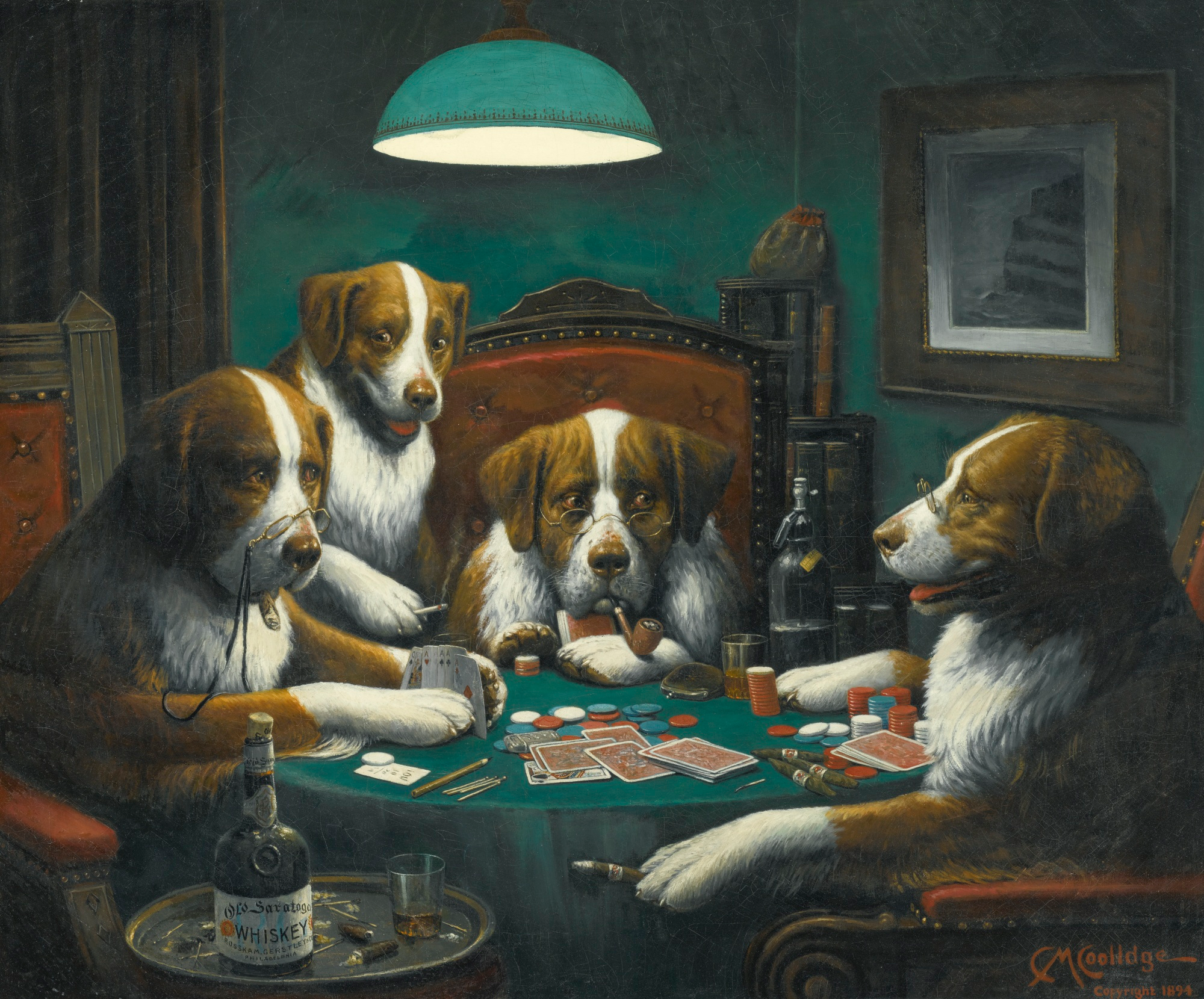
Poker Game, oil on canvas, Cassius Marcellus Coolidge, 1894, the first of the 11 Dogs Playing Poker paintings

The picture entitled A Distinguished Member of the Humane Society depicts a dog that was well known in London. The dog, depicted in 1838 by Sir Edwin Landseer, was a Newfoundland called "Bob" who was found in a shipwreck off the coast of England. The dog found his way to the London waterfront, where he became known for saving people from drowning a total of twenty-three times over the course of fourteen years. For this, he was made a distinguished member of the Royal Humane Society, granting him a medal and access to food. Newfoundlands with white patches are now recognized as a breed of their own, as a "Landseer".

By the Victorian era, the sporting tradition remained, but after the establishment of The Kennel Club in the UK in 1873 and the American Kennel Club in 1884, breed standards, or "word pictures," were introduced, and dog portraits soared in popularity.

There are stylistic differences between the British and European depictions; William Secord, a world expert on canine art, stated, "Belgian, Dutch, Flemish and German artists were more influenced by realism, depicting the dog the way it really looked, with dirt on it's [sic] coat and slobber and that kind of thing. You see Alfred Stevens, who's Belgian, do street dogs and dogs that are suffering, which in England you never see. British depictions were more idealized. They want it pretty, simply put.”

== Contemporary ==
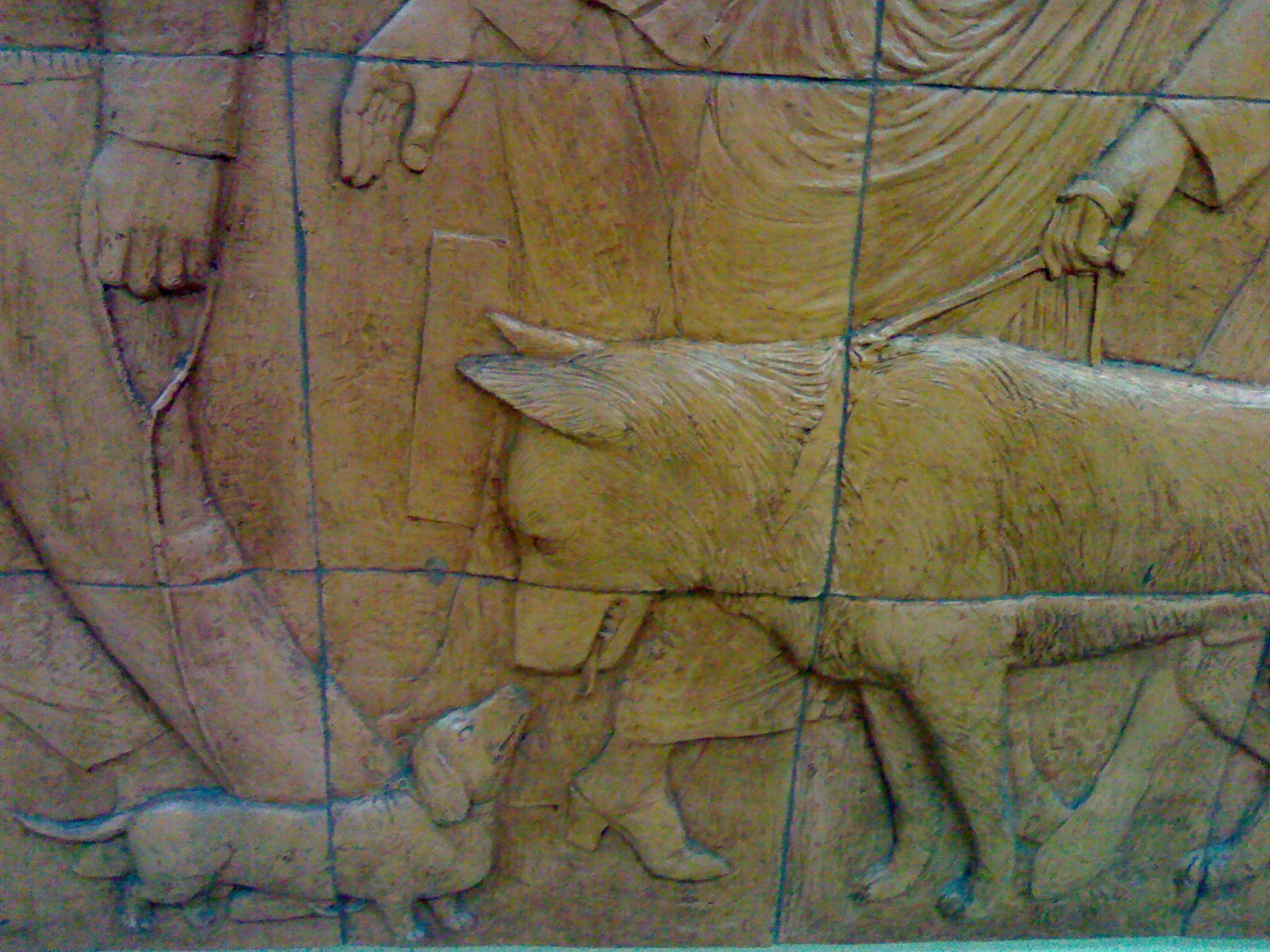
William McElcheran's Cross Section-dogs TMU station, Toronto

The prices achieved for canine art increased in the 1980s–1990s, and started to gain popularity in established art circles rather than antique markets. Buyers were generally divided into three dominant categories: hunters; breeders and exhibitors of pedigree dogs; and owners of companion animals.

Pablo Picasso frequently included his canine companions in his paintings. Particularly well-known and often featured in his work was a Dachshund, named Lump, who actually belonged to David Douglas Duncan but lived with Picasso.

Depictions of dogs have extended as well to the artform of photography, a noted example being the work of photographer Elliott Erwitt.

== Picture gallery ==
Paintings of dogs as a companion

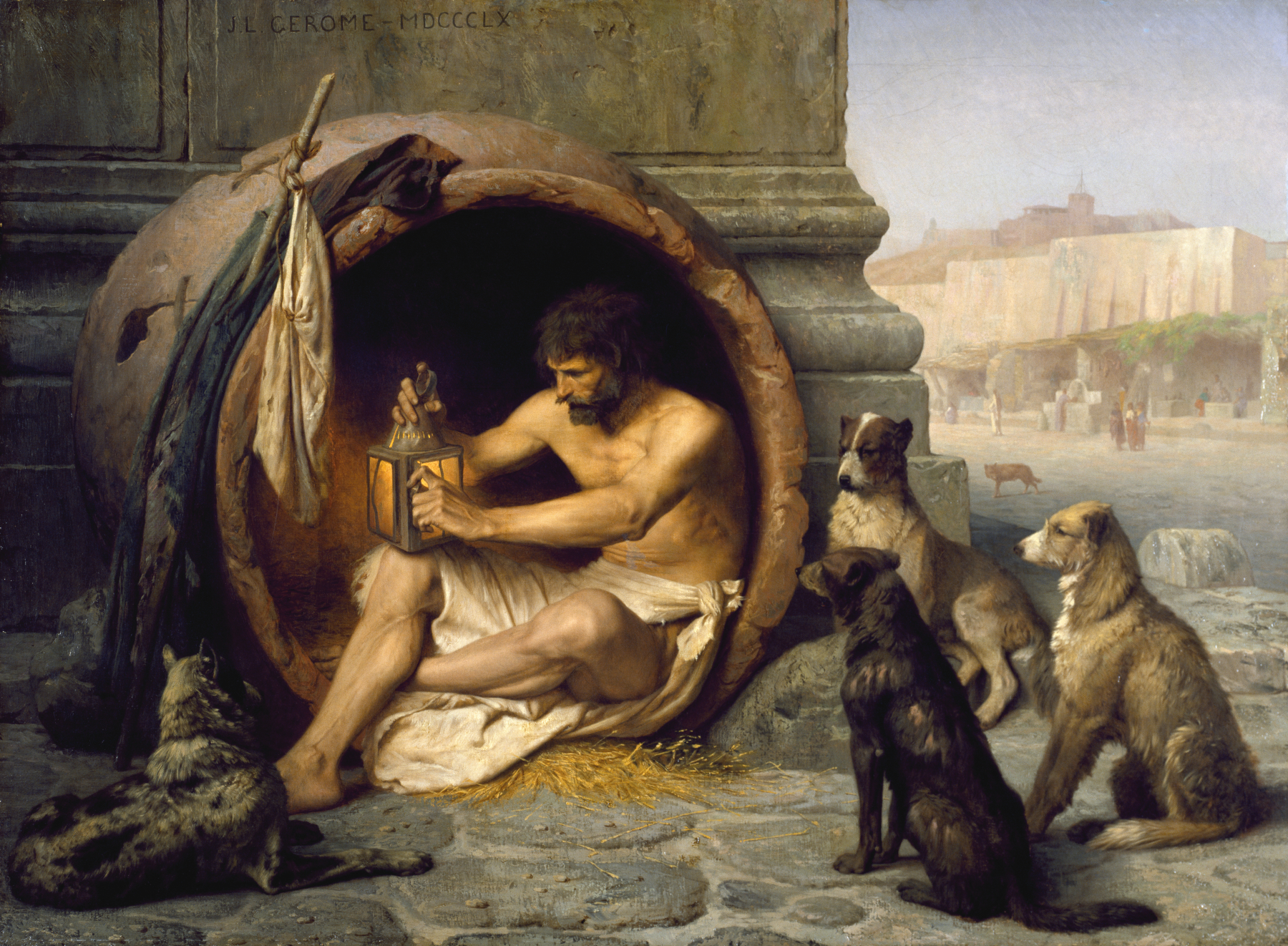
Jean-Léon Gérôme. Diogenes with dogs.

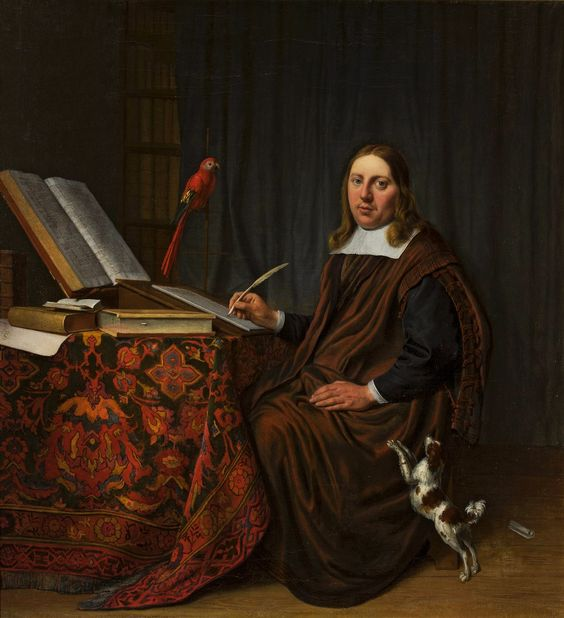
Painting by Hendrik Martenszoon Sorgh, a Dutch scholar sitting with his dog and parrot.

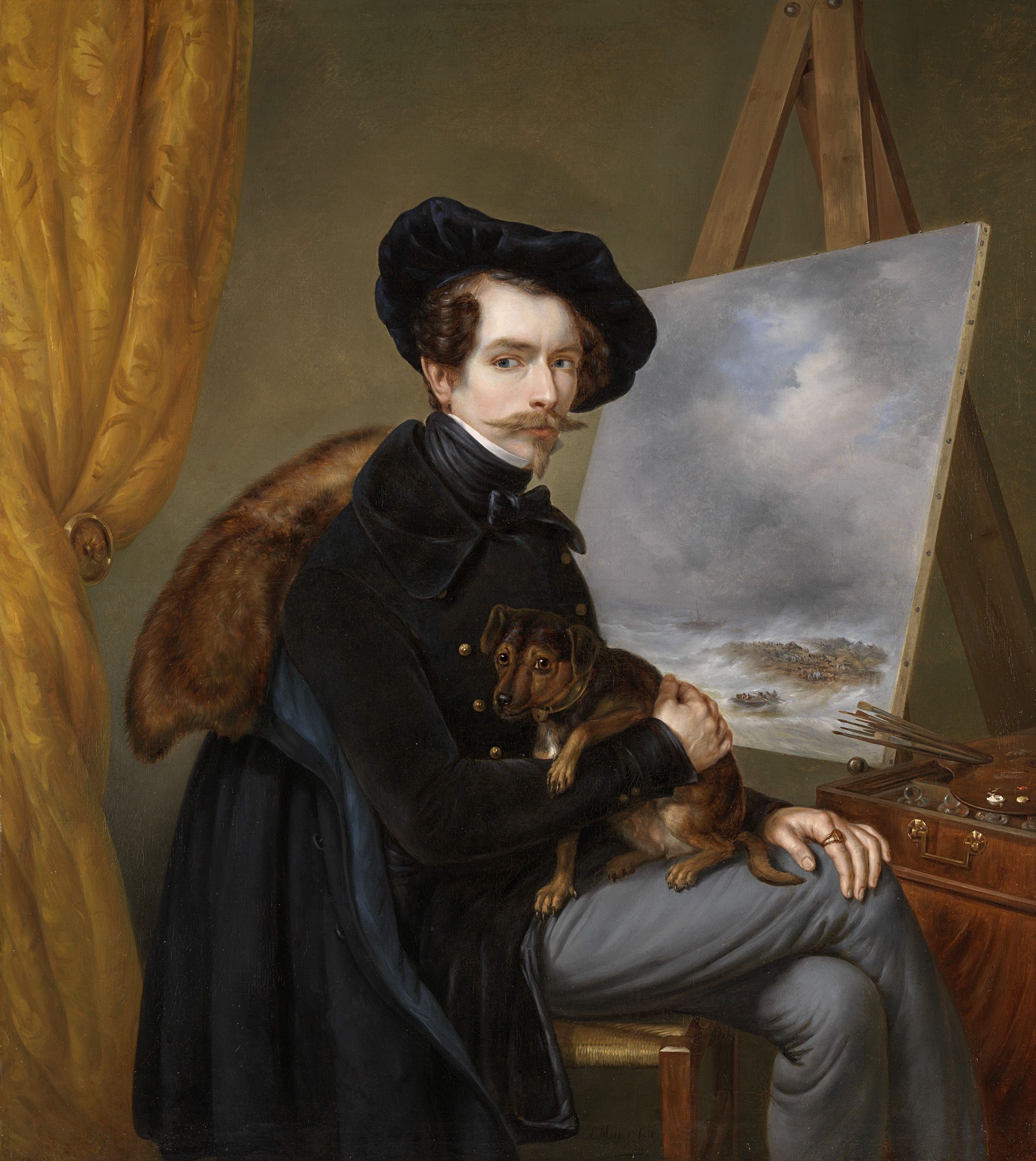
Self-portrait, by Louis Meijer. The painter's dog sits on his lap.

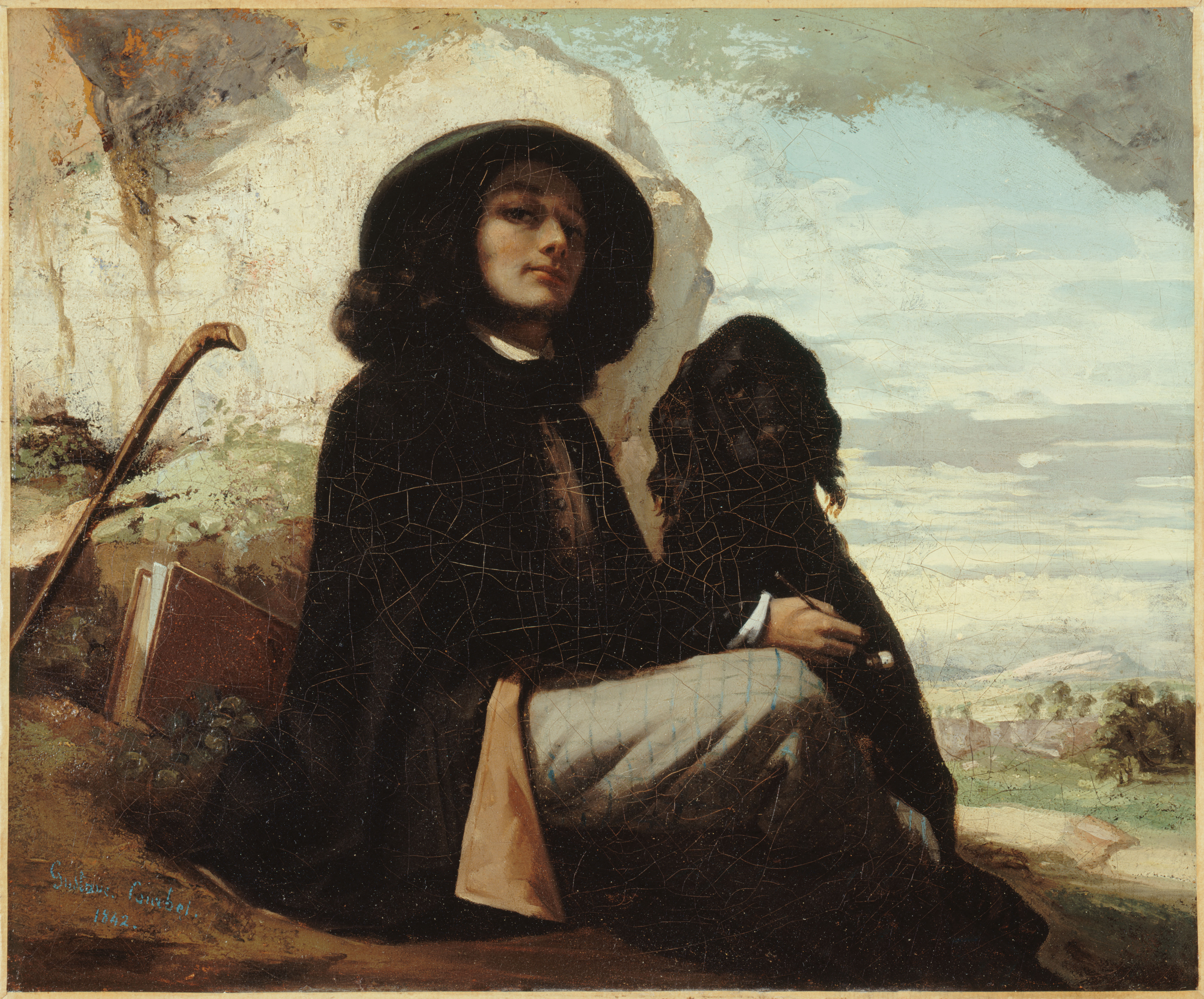
Gustave Courbet, Self-portrait with black spaniel dog.

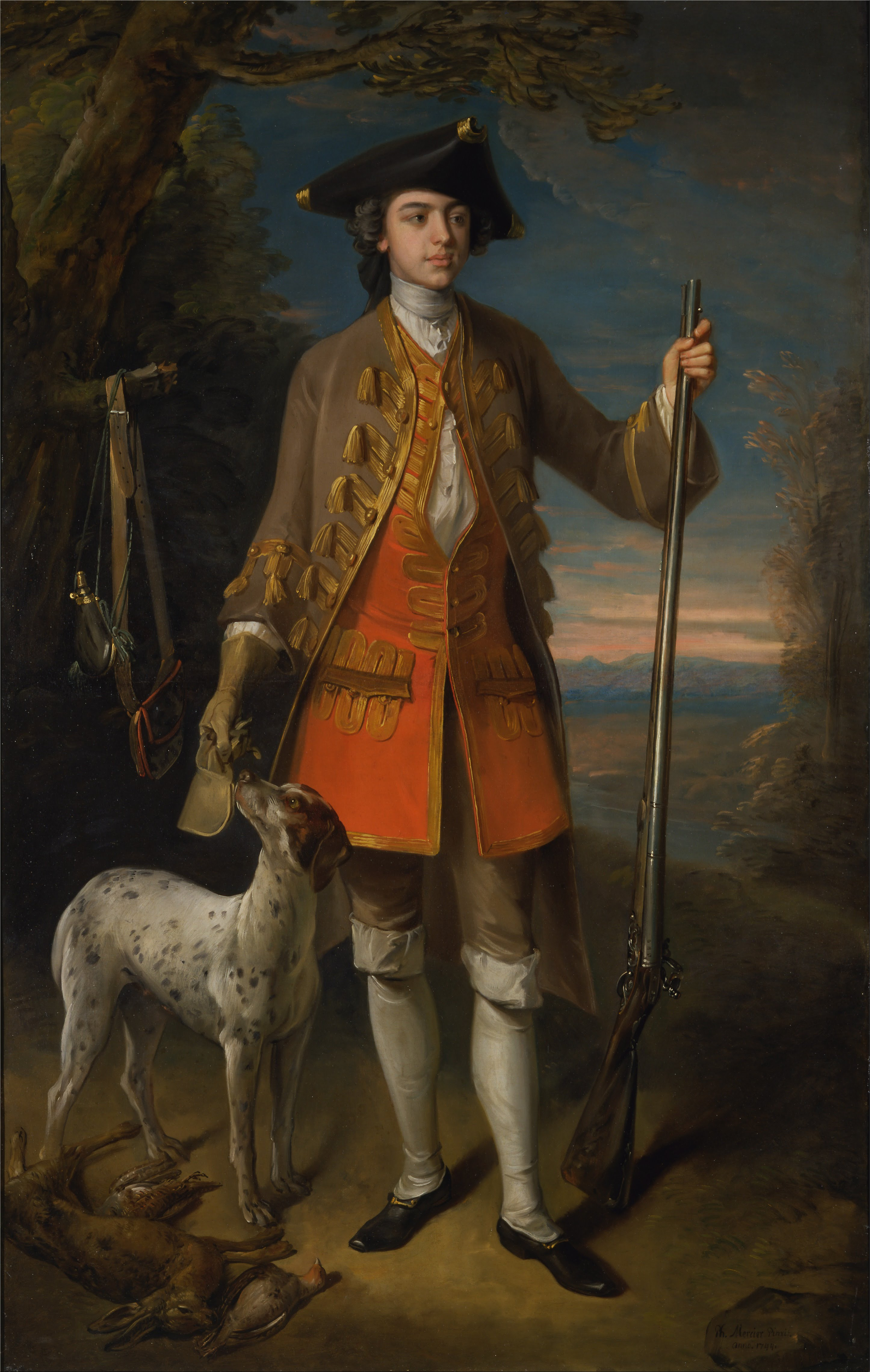
Sir Edward Hales, Baronet, of Hales Place, Hackington, Kent with his dog, by Philippe Mercier

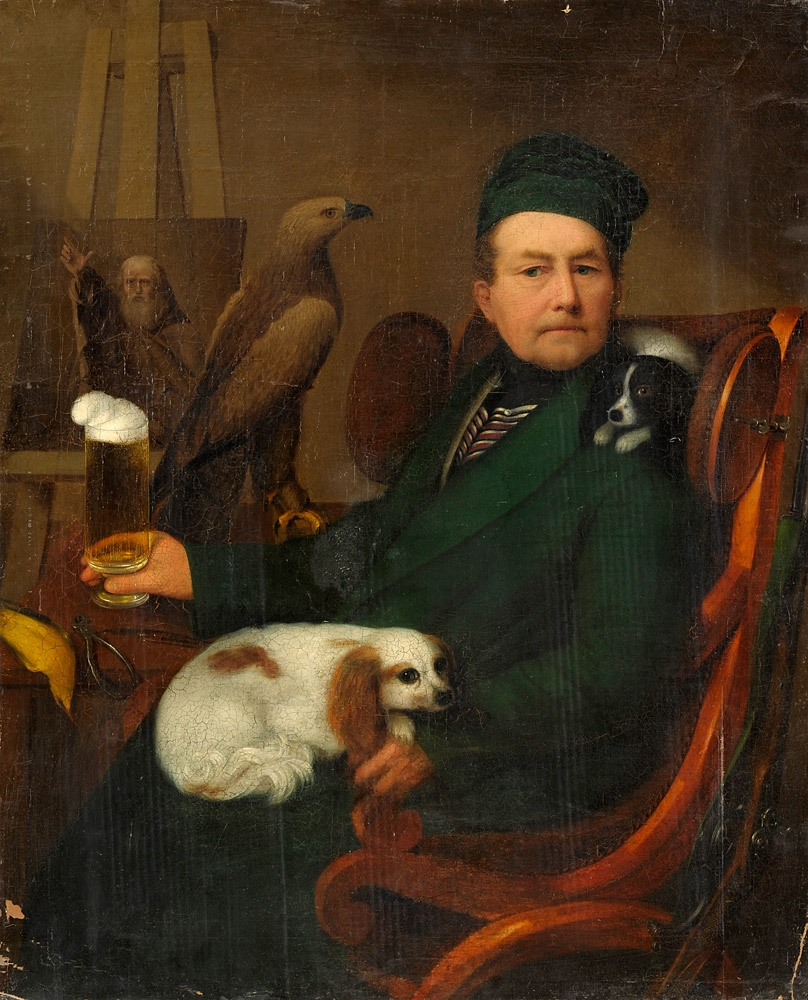
Unknown artist, portrait of a man with a beer, kite and his dogs.

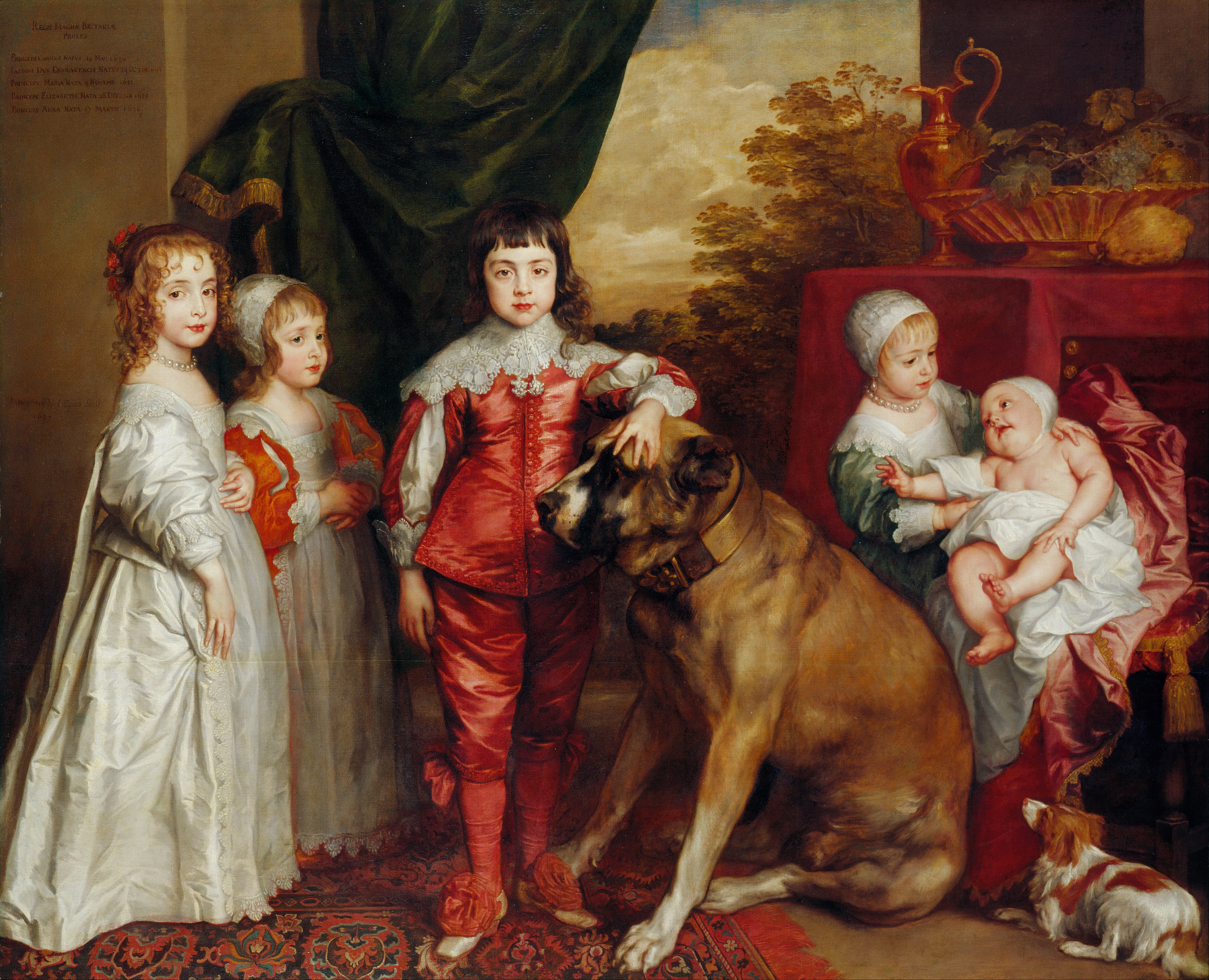
Anthony van Dyck The five eldest Children of Charles I of England with two dogs

Sir Joshua Reynolds Portrait of Philip Gell with a Spaniel

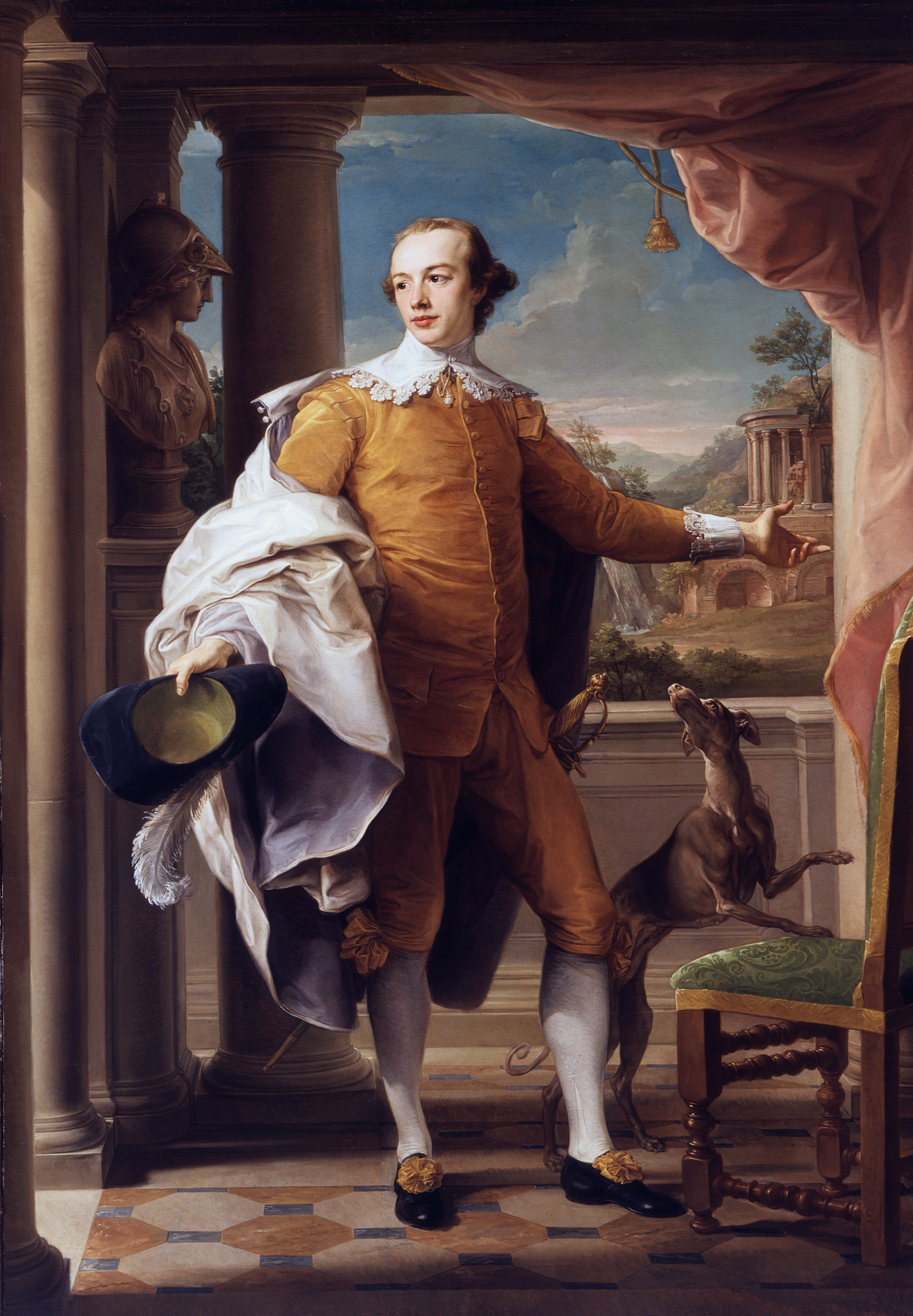
Pompeo Batoni (1708–1787) Portrait of Sir Wyndham Knatchbull-Wyndham with a whippet

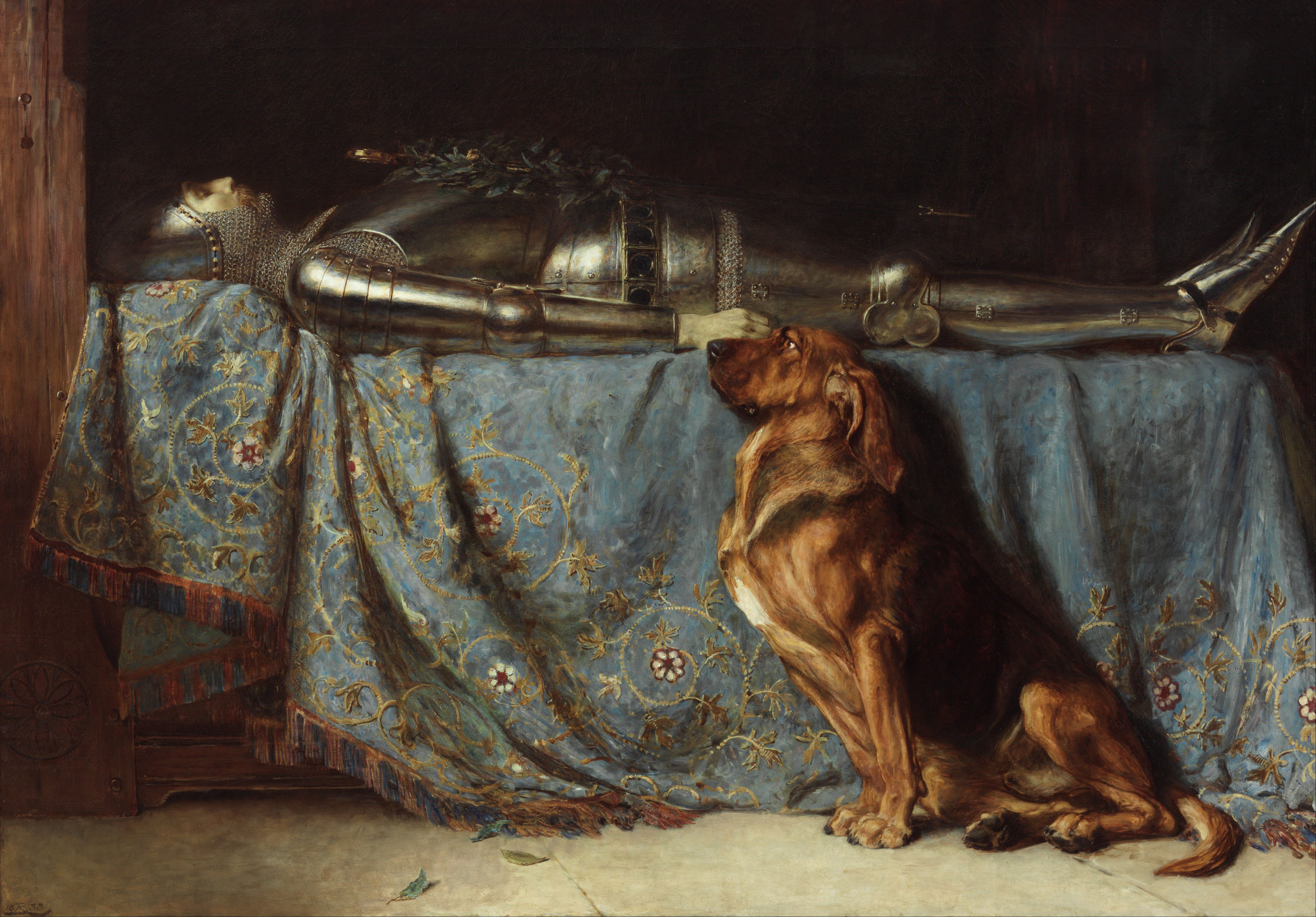
Briton Rivière (1840-1920) Requiescat (Rest in peace) 1888
Paintings of dogs

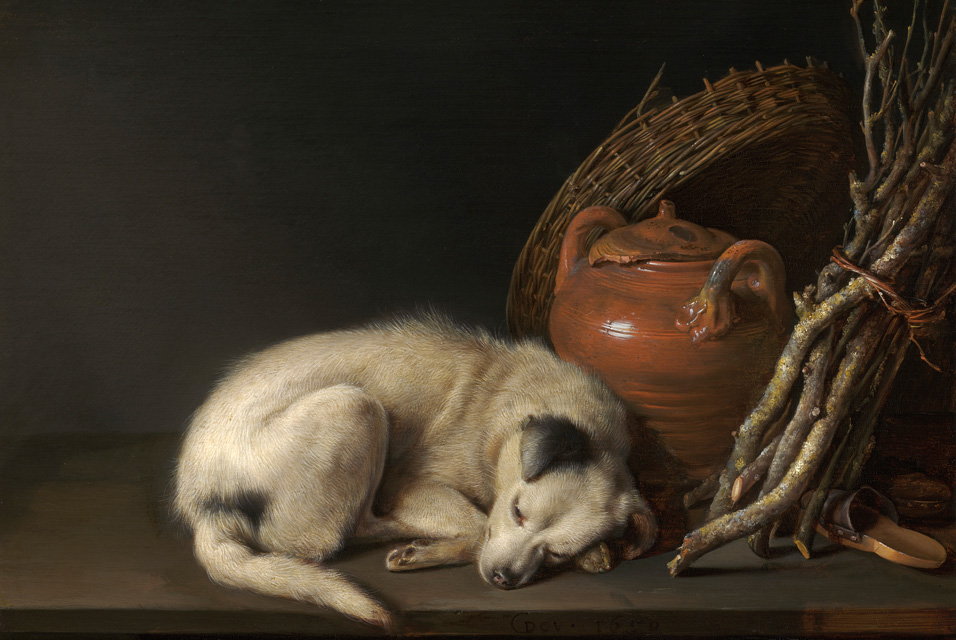
Gerrit Dou, Sleeping Dog, 1650

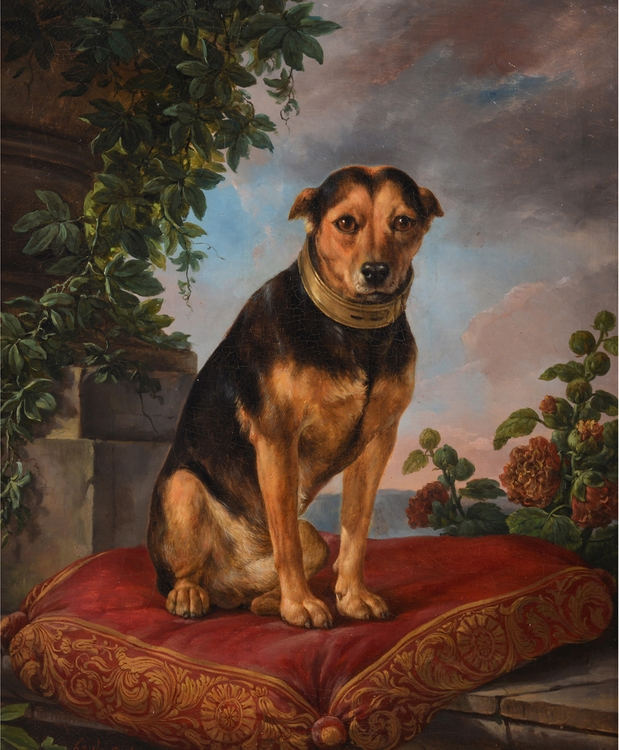
Henri Van Assche, Portrait of a dog, seated on a red cushion, 1801

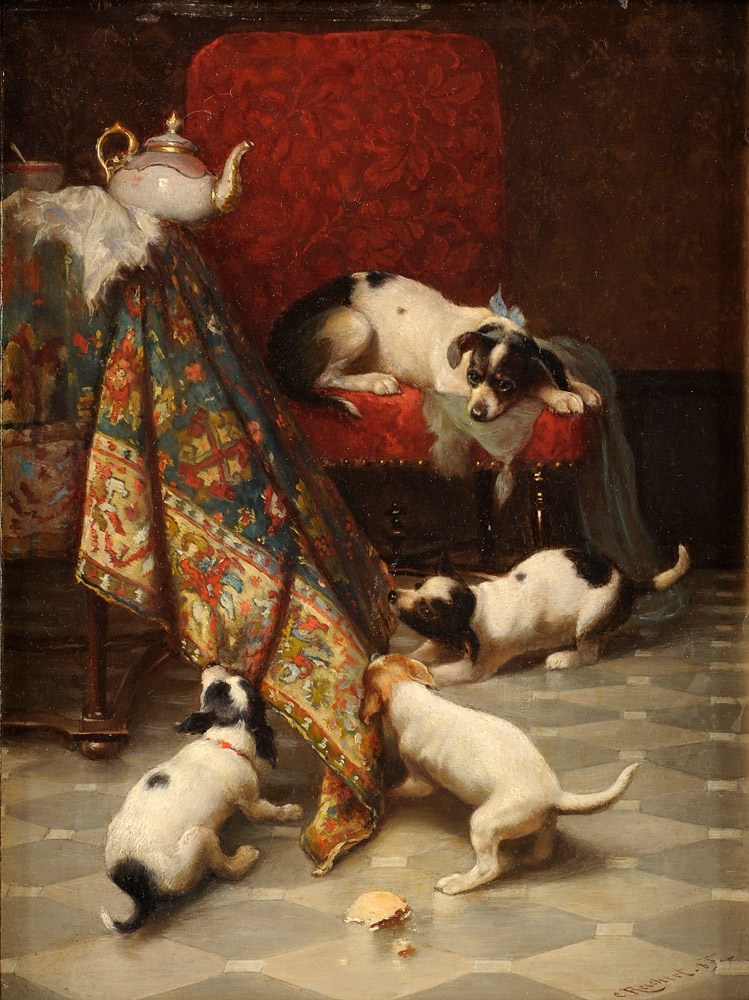
Puppies by Carl Reichert (1836–1918)

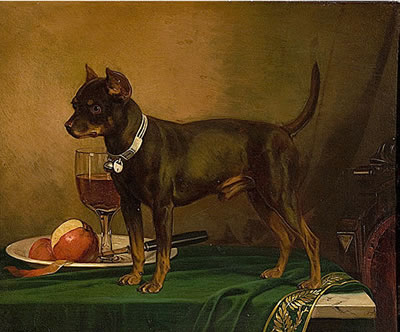
Little Terrier by Frederick August Wenderoth, 1875

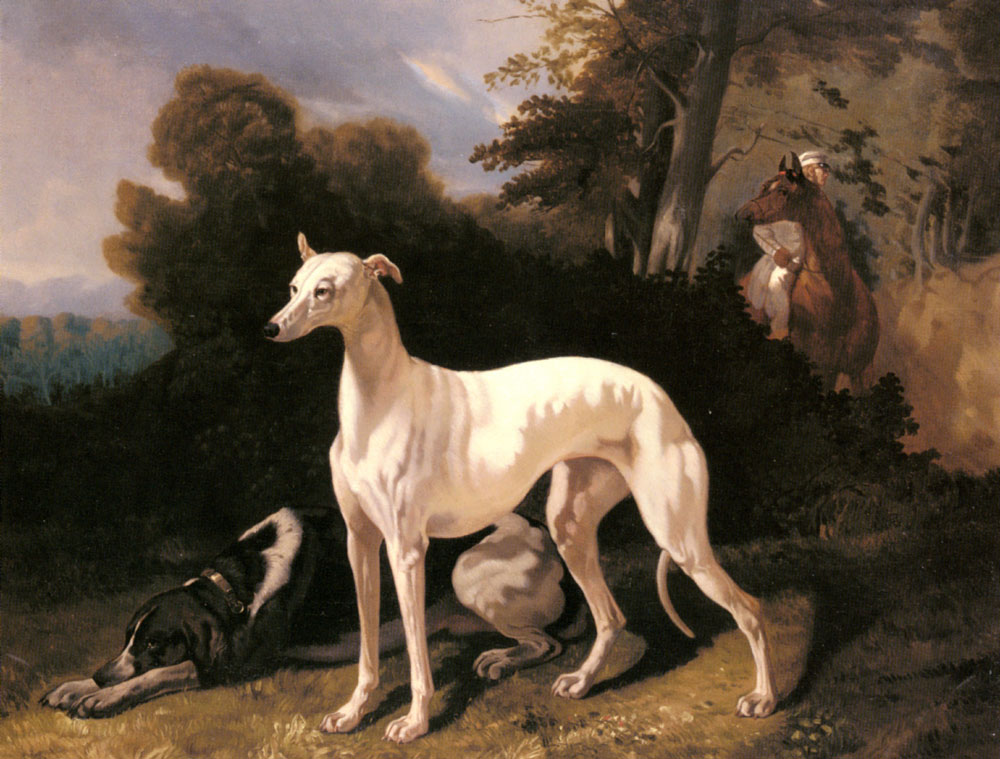
A Greyhound with Landscape by Alfred Dedreux (1810–1860)
Statues of dogs

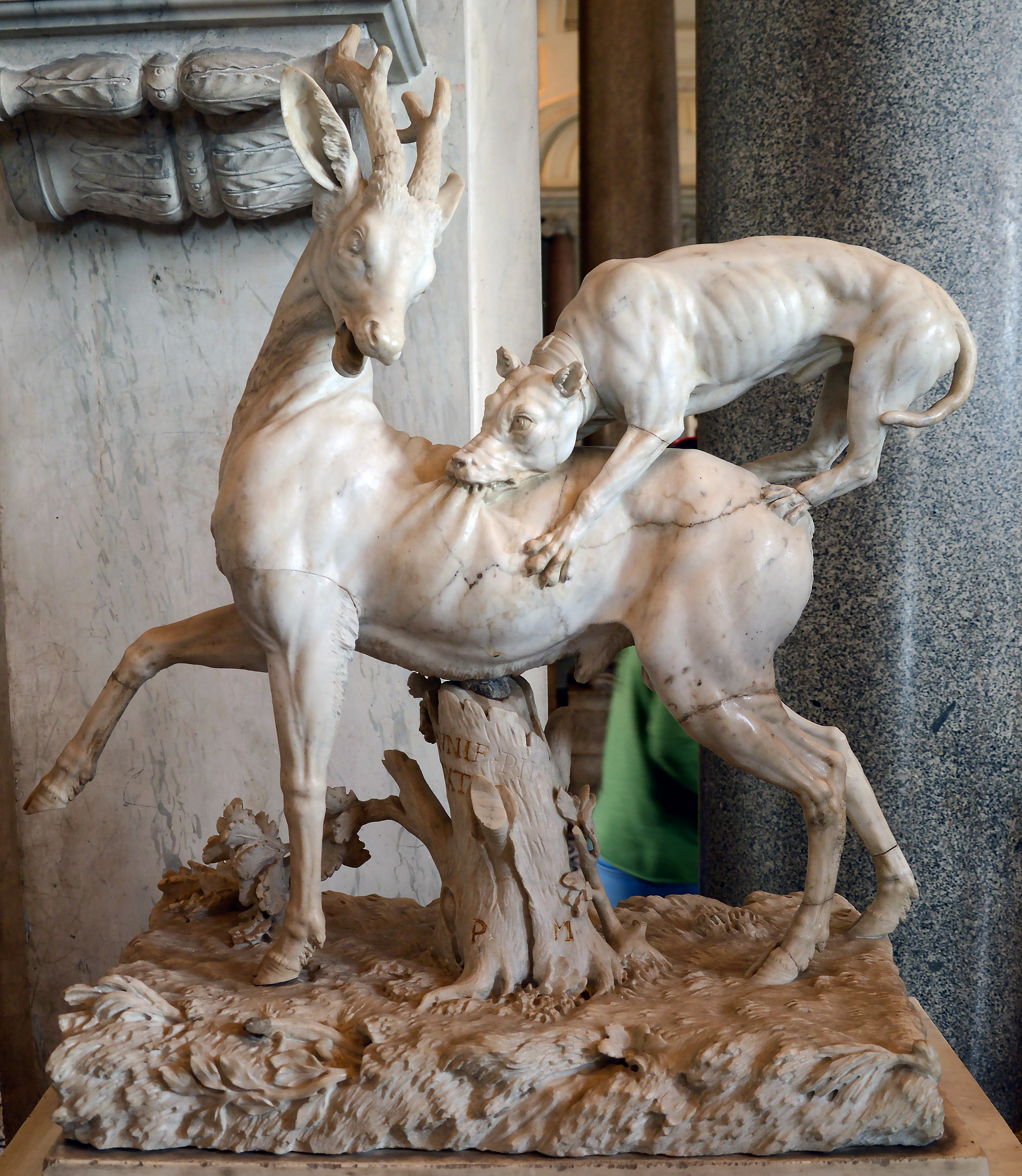
Roman statue of a hunting dog in Museo Pio-Clementino

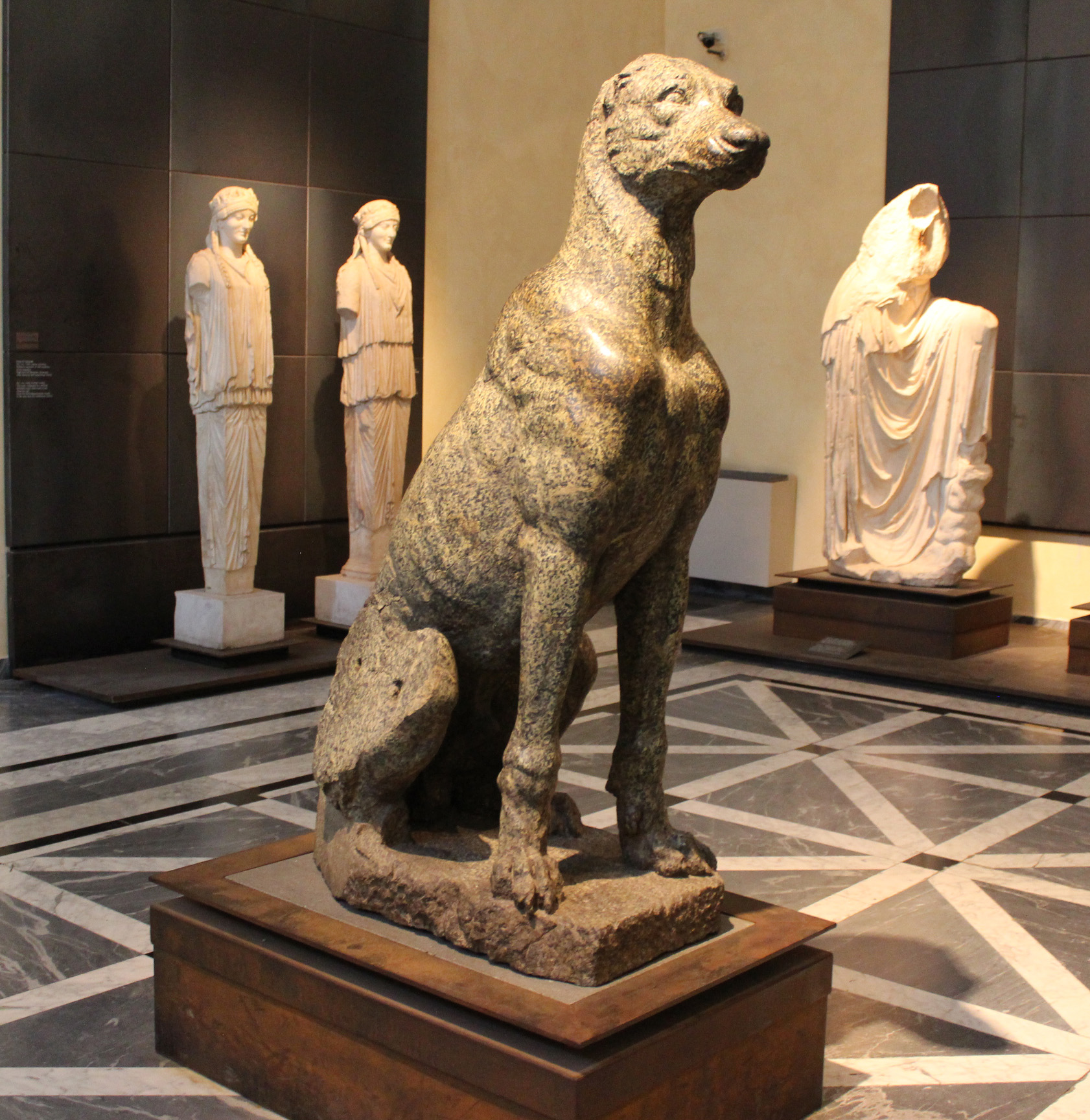
Statue in the Capitoline Museums

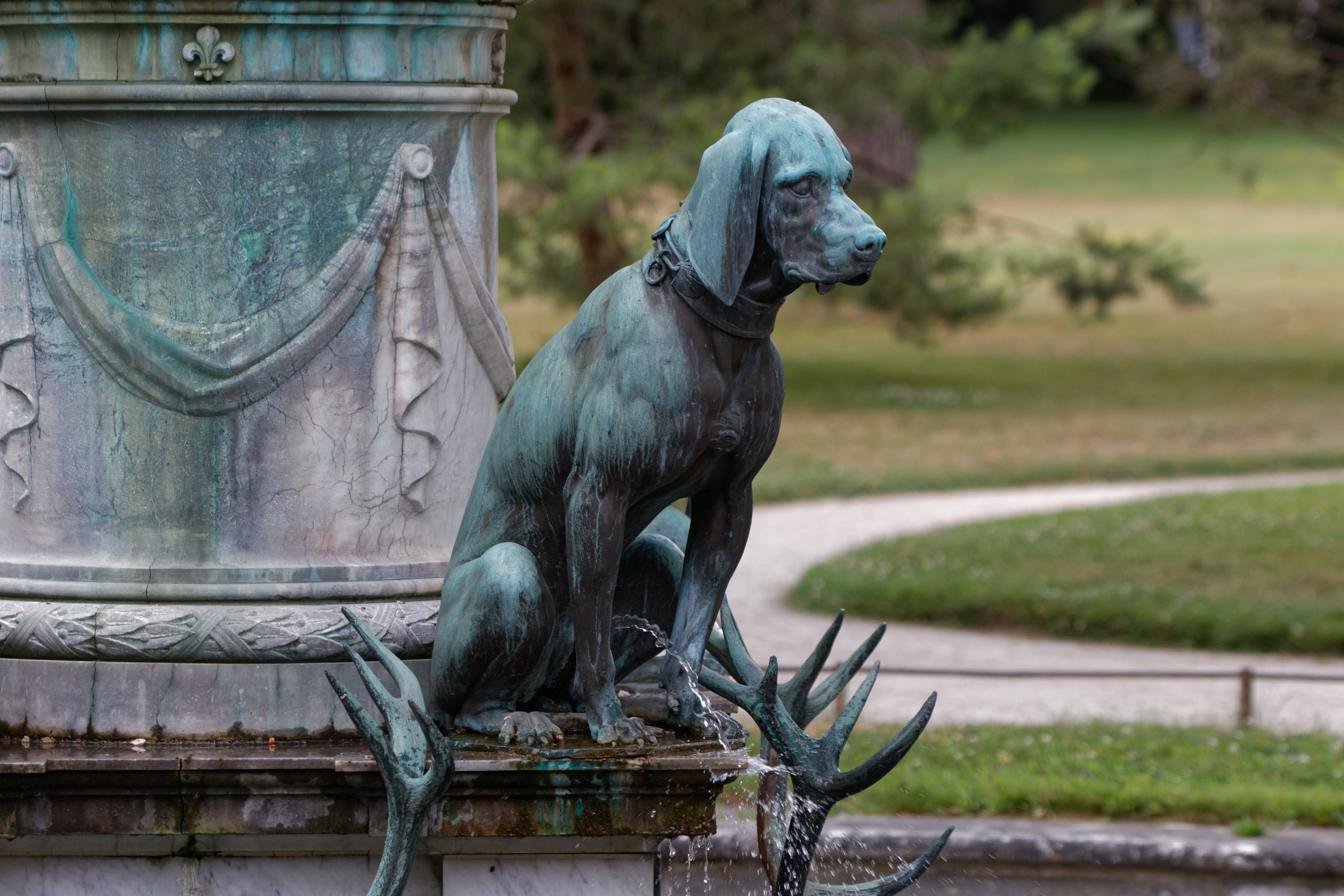
Statue at the Fountain of Diana

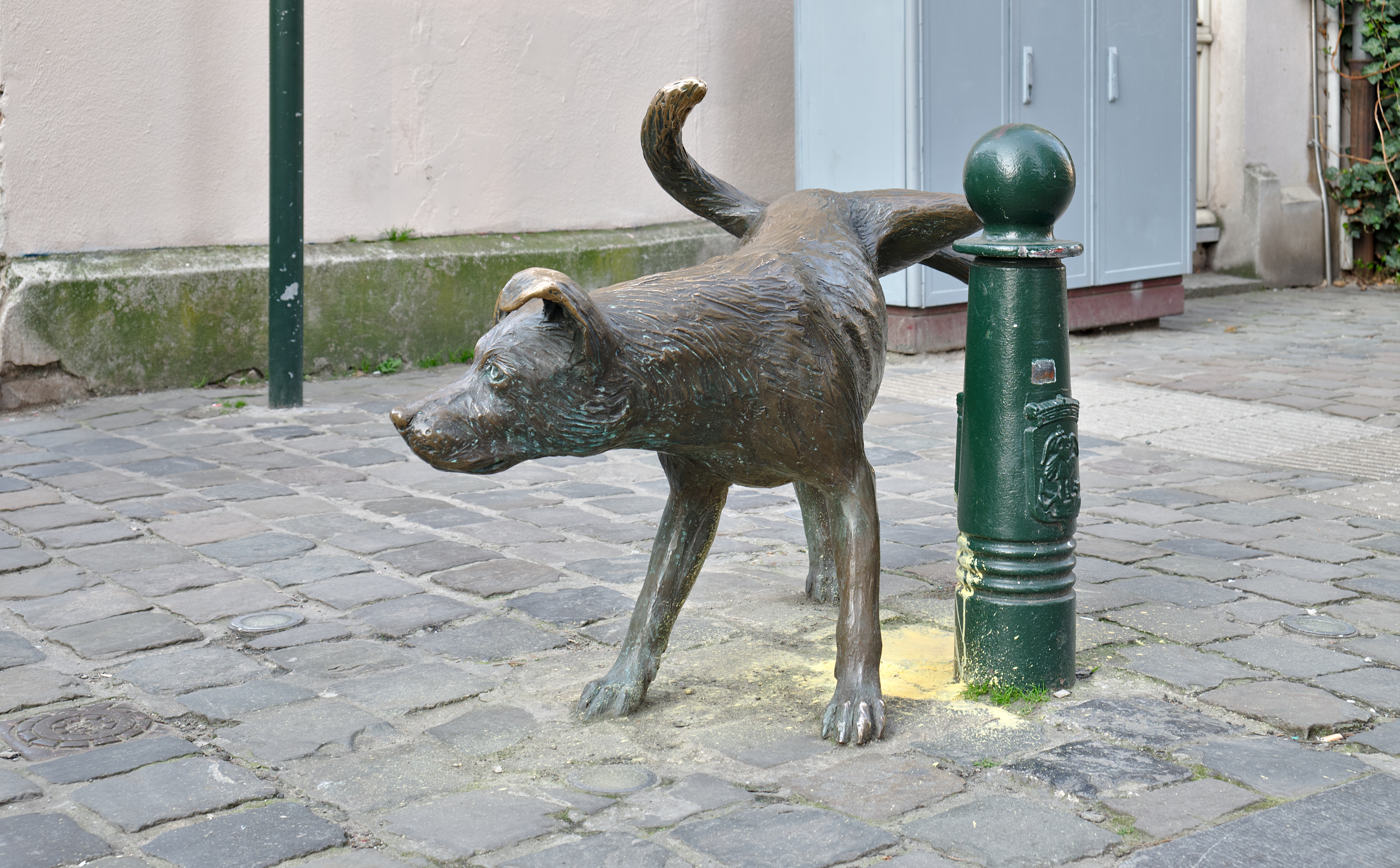
Het Zinneke in Brussels

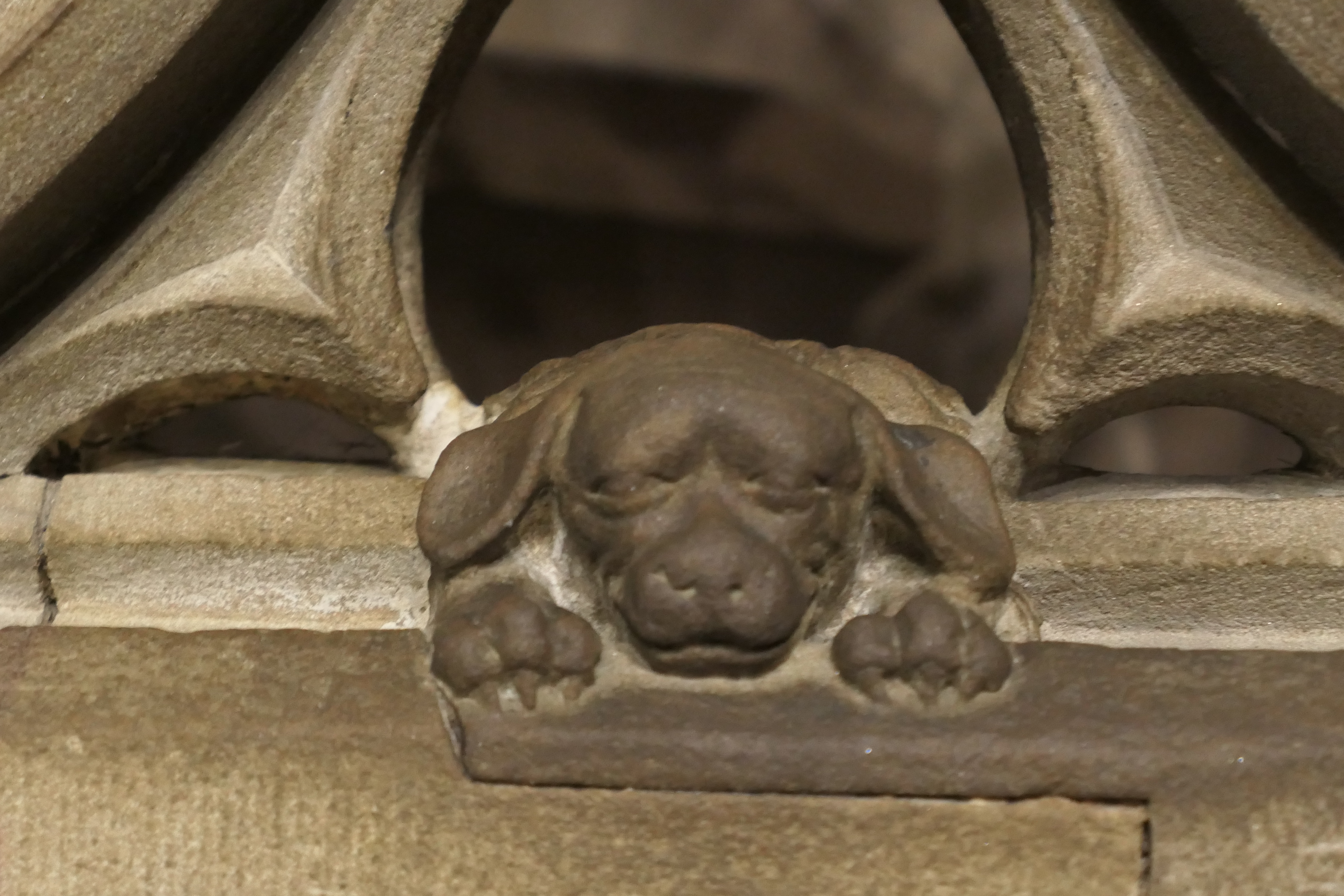
Statue in Strasbourg Cathedral

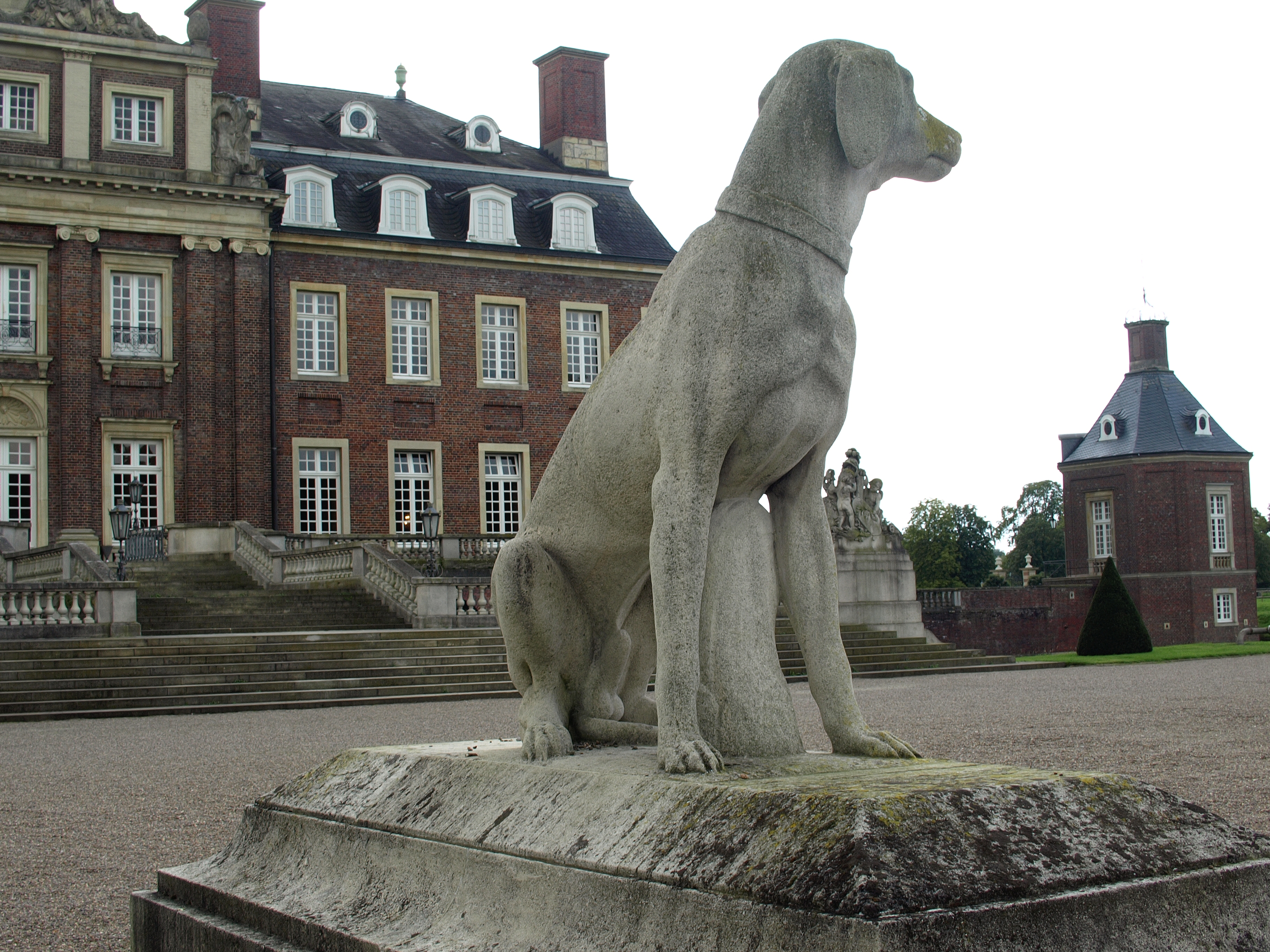
Statue at Nordkirchen Castle

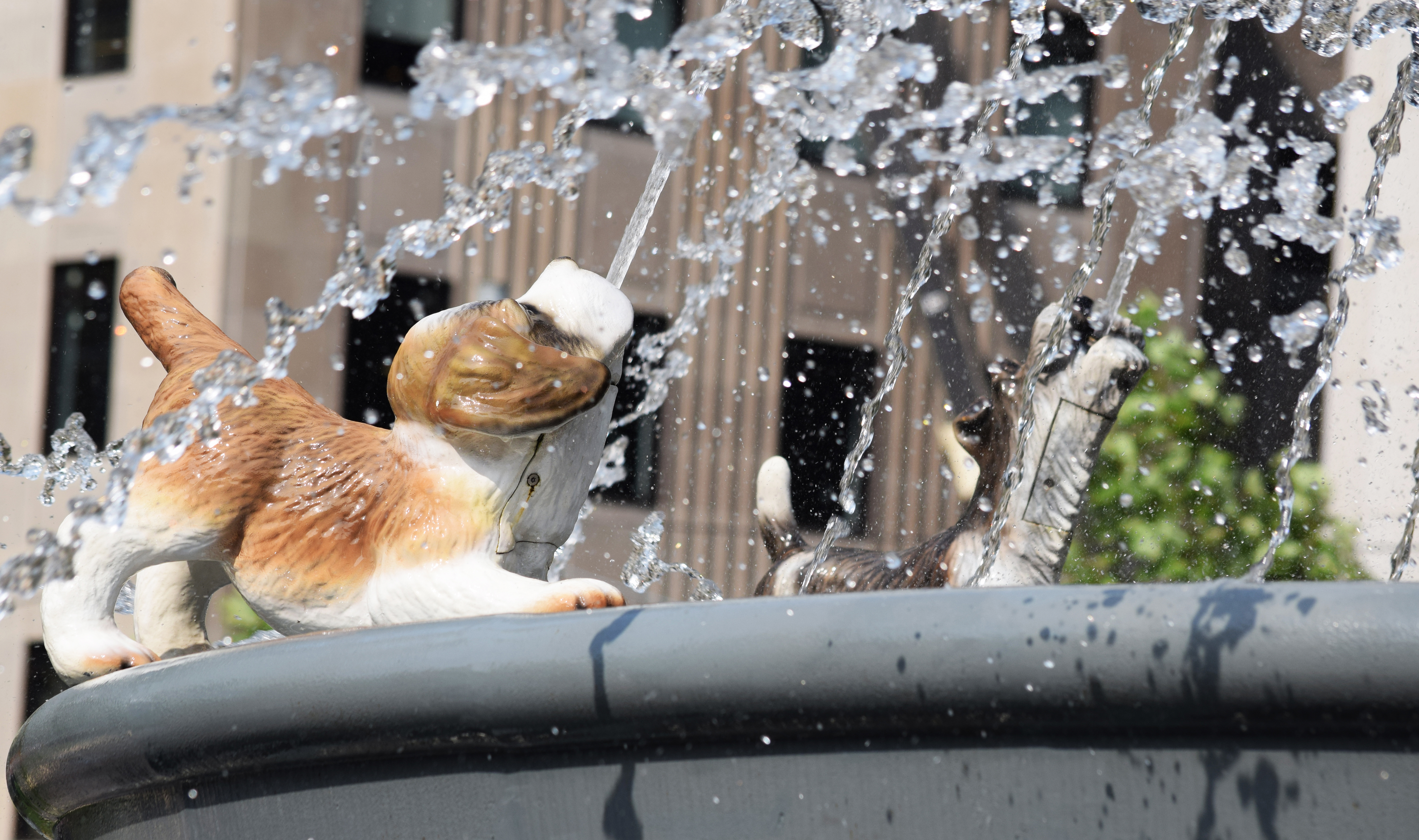
Fountains in Berczy Park

== See also ==
- List of fictional dogs
- List of individual dogs
- Dogs in religion
- Dog in Chinese mythology
- Dogs in Mesoamerican folklore and myth
- Islam and dogs
- Laelaps (mythology)
- Staffordshire dog figurine
