= Inugami =

Japanese spiritual possession by the spirit of a dog

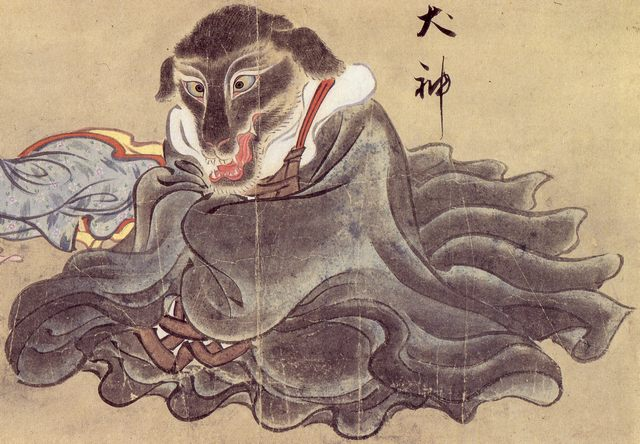
"Inugami" from the Hyakkai Zukan by Sawaki Suushi

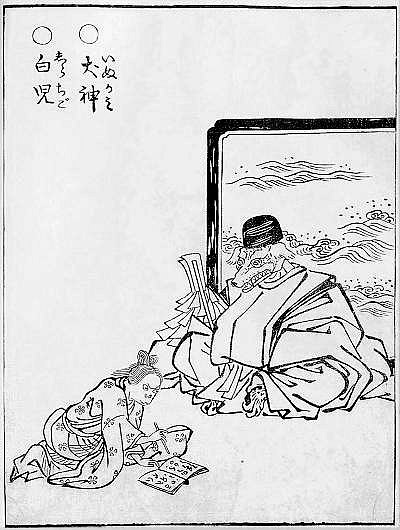
"Inugami" from the Gazu Hyakki Yagyō by Sekien Toriyama. The one on the bottom-left that looks like a child is a "shirachigo" (白児, "white infant") that was either the inugami's pupil or the yōkai child of a disabled person.

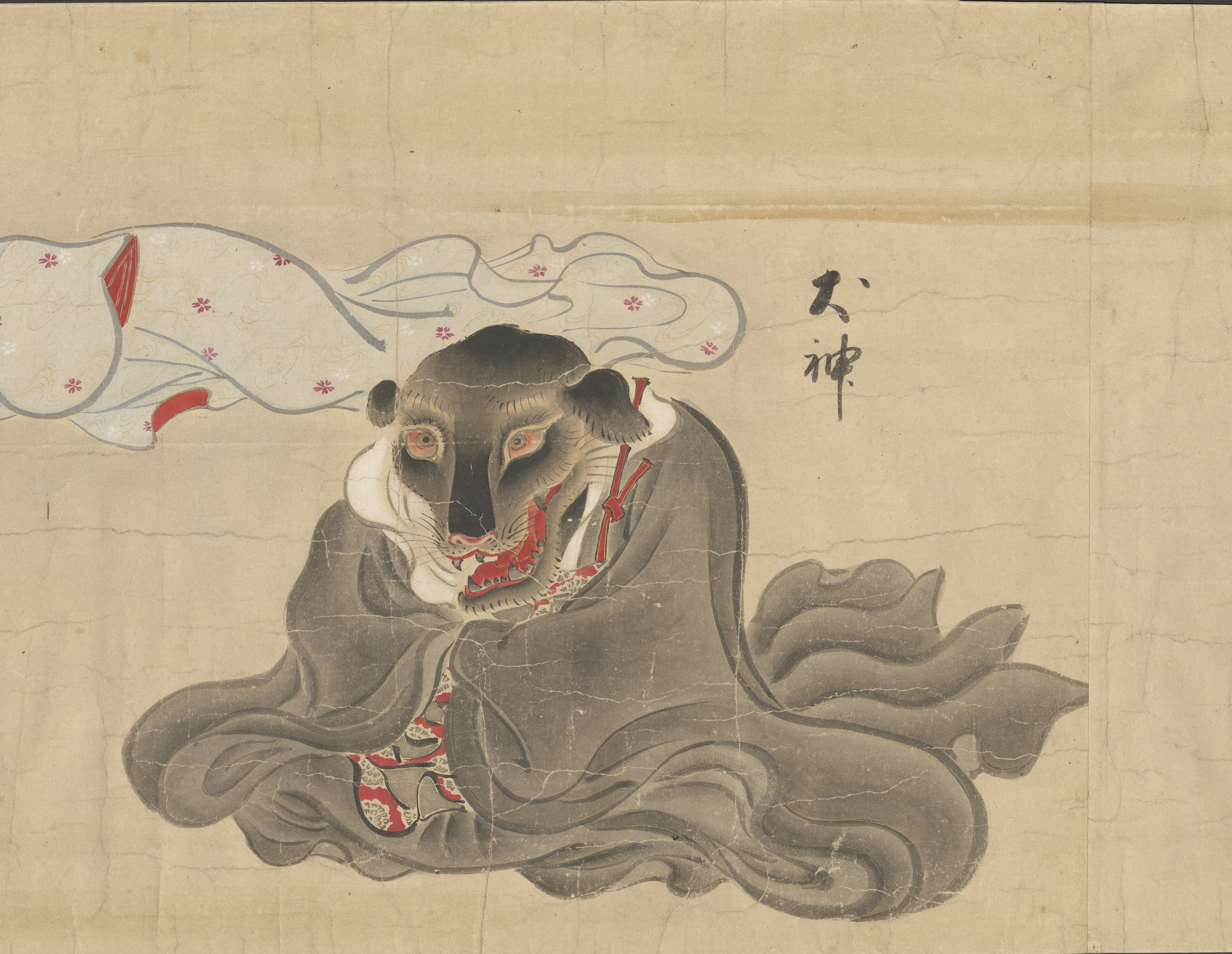
Inugami (犬神) from Bakemono no e (化物之繪, c. 1700), Harry F. Bruning Collection of Japanese Books and Manuscripts, L. Tom Perry Special Collections, Harold B. Lee Library, Brigham Young University.

Inugami (犬神; "dog god/spirit"), like kitsunetsuki, is a spiritual possession by the spirit of a dog, widely known about in western Japan. They seemed firmly rooted until recent years in eastern Ōita Prefecture, Shimane Prefecture, and a part of Kōchi Prefecture in northern Shikoku, and it is also theorized that Shikoku, where no foxes (kitsune) could be found, is the main base of the inugami. Furthermore, traces of belief in inugami exists in the Yamaguchi Prefecture, all of Kyushu, even going past the Satsunan Islands all the way to the Okinawa Prefecture. In the Miyazaki Prefecture, the Kuma District, Kumamoto Prefecture, and Yakushima, the local dialect pronounces it "ingami" and in Tanegashima, they are called "irigami." It can also be written in kanji as 狗神.

== Origins ==
The phenomenon of inugami spiritual possession was a kojutsu (also called "kodō" or "kodoku", a greatly feared ritual for employing the spirits of certain animals) that was already banned in the Heian period that was thought to have spread throughout the population, and it was known to involve cutting off the head of a starving dog and burying the dog at a crossroads to inflame its grudges as people pass over its head so that its spirit would turn into a curse that could be used.

Another method was to bury the dog alive leaving only its head sticking out or attach the dog to a supporting pole, put some food in front of the dog, cut the dog's neck just when it is about to starve so that the head would fly towards and bite at the food, burn the dog into mere bones, put the remains into a vessel, and deify it. By doing so, it will spiritually possess that person forever, granting their wishes. Another method was to set several dogs to fight against each other, give the one dog remaining alive some fish, cut off that dog's head, and eat the remaining fish. In Yamaga, Hayami District, Ōita Prefecture (now Kitsuki), there were actual cases where a miko did cut off a dog's heads this way, dried the maggots that gathered at the heads, and sold them calling it inugami, and there were also people who were thankful for these and bought them.

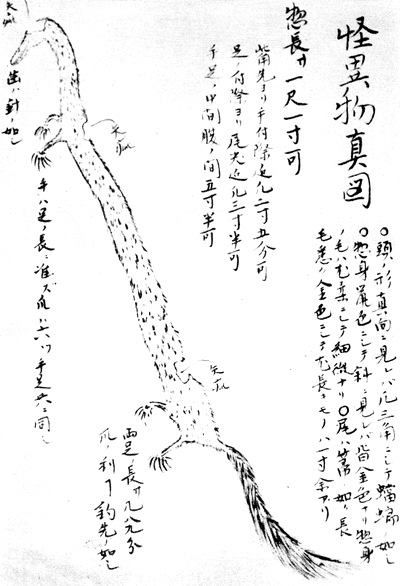
A depiction of an inugami from Oka Kumaomi's Chiriyahokori

However, in descriptions of an inugami's appearance, it is said that they have a somewhat large patch of color around the size of a mouse, and they have split ends on their tail, and as they were a species of talpidae, their eyes cannot be seen, and moved in single file one after another. Thus, they would seem to be more like kuda-gitsune or osaki rather than dogs, so it does not appear as if they were purely following the legends of kodō curses (such as the "dog curse" found in the In Search of the Supernatural). In fact, it would seem more as if the main focus of these descriptions were imitations of the belief in fox spirits. They also seem similar in appearance to house mouse, and their mouths are said be torn vertically with a pointy end, and in the Ōita Prefecture, they are said to resemble a dsinezumi shrew, and in Toyooka town, Hayami District, Ōita, they are said to be a weasel with black and white spots. On the island of Aishima in the aforementioned Yamaguchi Prefecture, they are called "inugami nezumi" (inugami mice), and like the long-nosed house mouse, they are said to form groups of 75 mice in a single house. On the mountain of Iyayama, Miyoshi District, Tokushima Prefecture, the inugami type are called "suikazura," and they are said to be a bit larger than mice and warm themselves by the fireside. In a book titled "Chiriyahokori" by the kokugaku Oka Kumaomi, it is stated that they have a body length of 1 shaku and 1 sun and looked like bats. Also, in Asai Ryōi's Otogi Bōko, the inugami of Tosa Province was told to have a physical appearance with length similar to that of a rice grain and a body that was colored with patches of black and white, among other colors.

There are several theories about how inugami came to be, including the tale that the body of the nue slain by Minamoto no Yorimasa split into 4 parts and scattered and flew to different lands to become inugami, (Note: Furthermore in this case, the nue said to be the origin of the dog god (inugami), snake god (hebigami), and monkey god (sarugami) is told to have the head of a monkey, the body of a dog, and the tail of a snake, which is a little different from the usual depiction.) as well as the tale that it was born from Kōbō-Daishi's painting of a dog that was made for the sake of warding off boars. There is also the legend that when Gennō Shinshō attempted to calm the curse of a sessho-seki by splitting the stone, the fragments that flew off to Kōzuke Province (now Gunma Prefecture) turned into osaki and the fragments that flew to Shikoku became inugami.

== Having inugami ==
Inugami are explained to be raised in the storage room chests (tansu), under the floors, and in the water jugs of the families that have inugami. Like other types of spirit possession, inugami become more easily attached to people who are wildly unstable in emotions. Those who get possessed by it (those who get an inugami attached to them) are said to feel pain in their chest, complain about pain in their arms and feet, suddenly sway without warning, and bark like a dog. They would enter and invade the human body from the ears, and it's said that those who get possessed by these would develop a personality full of jealousy. In Tokushima Prefecture, it is said that those that get possessed by an inugami would become voracious big eaters and would have teeth marks on their body when they die. Not limited to just humans, inugami would also possess cows and horses and even inorganic materials, and when they possess a saw, it would become useless.

The idea there exist bloodlines of families that easily get possessed by an inugami as well as bloodlines of inugami themselves come from the regional tales told by the bloodlines of the sorcerers, yamabushi, priests, and fuko that engaged in kodoku. In many cases, it shows how those nomadic peoples who engaged in folk sorcery would earn trust and respect and at the same time be treated with discrimination. This is because inugami follows people into their descendants, and it was normal for everyday villagers to consider it taboo to marry into an inugami bloodline, and even associating with them was normally seen with apprehension. In various parts of Shikoku, there is a custom during marriage to check the bloodlines for inugami, and there were none too few cases when it was a problem related to "assimilation issues" (dōwa mondai).

In the legends of Komatsu, Shūsō District, Ehime Prefecture (now part of Saijō), there were as many inugami as there were people in families that had inugami, and the number of inugami increased each time the family grew larger. It is said that these inugami would pick up cues and understand what the family is thinking and the inugami would immediately go possess them when the family wanted something. However, it is said that sometimes they didn't behave in an obedient manner and would bite to death members of the family that have inugami.

It is said that those afflicted with illnesses that come from inugami were unable to be cured by doctors and needed to have the inugami removed by a sorcerer. In Tanegashima, there is a practice called "inugami-tsure" (meaning "taking along an inugami") that was performed when a family that had inugami was known or even just suspected without confirmation to have transferred an inugami to another family whereby the family that originally had inugami would bring food into the other family's house to take the inugami along with them and then go to live in seclusion in a hut in the outskirts of town until the newly afflicted person was cured, and it is said that their descendants would continue even after that to live alone in the mountains.

Families that had inugami were thought to have prospered and grew wealthy. At the same time, there were also cases where they were not treated like fox spirits that brought fortune into families by being deified, but rather detested as curse gods.

== In popular culture ==
- The Inugami manga features an Inugami that encounters and befriends a boy named Fumiki.
- In CLAMP's X Inuki, the Inugami, is Yuzuriha Nekoi's beloved dog spirit. He also a part of the Dragons of Heaven in a way.
- In Season 5, Episode 17 of Grimm, titled "Inugami", two teenage boys' lives are threatened by a ghost dog Wesen called the Inugami who feels they did not get enough punishment for the accidental death of their friend.
- In Yo-kai Watch, the Inugami is a gray and silver fox Yokai who is a recolored version of Kyubi and is called Frostail in the English dub.
- In the Inuyasha manga and anime, the title character is a hanyo (half-demon) born of an Inugami family. His late father, Toga the Great Dog-Demon of the West, being a legendary Inugami of supreme strength. Additionally, Inuyasha's older half brother Sesshomaru is also a powerful Inugami, with his unnamed mother being one as well.
- The Megami Tensei series includes the Inugami as an early game recruitable demon. First appearing in Shin Megami Tensei III: Nocturne, the Inugami specializes in fire, ailment, and support-based skills.
- In Nura: Rise of the Yokai Clan, there also appears an evil Inugami under the leadership of the raccoon dog yōkai, Inugamigyobu Tamazuki.
- In Gin Tama, Episode 45, Sadaharu drank some strawberry milk and turned into an Inugami.
- In Gugure! Kokkuri-san, Episode 2, an Inugami appears and begins haunting the main character, Kohina.
- In Engaged to the Unidentified, Kobeni Yonomori's fiancé, sister-in-law, and mother-in-law are all Inugami.
- In Kakuriyo no Yadomeshi, the character Ranmaru is an Inugami.
- In a side-comic of Gunnerkrigg Court that presents the backstory of the character Coyote, Coyote visits numerous mythological and folkloric canines, including Inugami. Coyote is impressed by the ferociousness of Inugami and takes on this trait and visual markings that allude to depictions of Inugami.
- Inugami Korone is a Japanese VTuber affiliated with Hololive Production.
- Gantz manga and OVA Gantz take place in Osaka Japan where there seems to be a 100 demon night parade attacking the city. An Inugami is the lowest of the top 3 leaders of the group which also include a Tengu as well as Nurihayon as the boss or leader.
- In Inukami!, main protagonist Keita Kawahira's clan partners with Inugami to vanquish evil fiends. Keita is saddled with the troublesome Yoko.
- Tee K.O. from The Jackbox Party Pack 3 features an Inugami as a player icon.

== See also ==
- All Dogs Go to Heaven
- Amarok/Amaguq (Inuit mythology)
- Anubis
- Barghest (North England, Yorkshire)
- Black dog (folklore) (England)
- Black Shuck (East Anglia)
- Canis Major
- Canis Minor
- Cerberus (the hound of Hades)
- Chinese guardian liondogs
- Church Grim (England)
- Coyote (mythology)/Coyote (Navajo mythology)
- Cù-sìth (Scotland)
- Cŵn Annwn (Wales)
- The dingo in Aboriginal folklore and mythology
- Dip (Catalonia)
- Diting (the hound of Kṣitigarbha)
- Dog in Chinese mythology
- Dogs in religion
- Dog (zodiac)
- Fenrir
- Gwyllgi (Wales)
- Gytrash (Northern England)
- Hellhound
- Inu Hariko
- Inuyasha
- Komainu
- Michigan Dogman
- Moddey Dhoo (Mauthe Doog) (Manx)
- Ōkami
- Okuri-inu
- Panhu
- Raijū
- Sharvara and Shyama (the hounds of Yama)
- Shippeitaro
- Shisa
- Shishi
- Sirius/Dog Star
- Sunekosuri
- Tengu/Tiangou
- The Tinderbox
- Tokugawa Tsunayoshi (the "Dog Shōgun")
- Warg
- White Fang
- Wolves in folklore, religion and mythology
- Xiaotianquan, a mythological dog and faithful companion to Chinese god, Erlang Shen.
- Xolotl
- Yama-Inu (also see the Japanese wolf).

== General sources ==
- Takeshi Abe, Adam Beltz: The Negima Reader: Secrets Behind the Magic. DH Publishing Inc, 2007, ISBN 1932897240, page 49–51.
- Stephen H. Sumida: And the View from the Shore: Literary Traditions of Hawaiʻi. University of Washington Press, 1991, ISBN 0295970782, page 228.
- Moku Jōya: Mock Jōya's Things Japanese. Japan Times, Tokyo 1985, page 408–412.
- Herbert E. Plutschow: A reader in Edo period travel. Global oriental, 2006, ISBN 1901903230, page 16–19.
- Michaela Haustein: Mythologien der Welt: Japan, Ainu, Korea epubli, Berlin 2011, ISBN 3844214070, page 19.
- Keiko I. McDonald: Reading a Japanese Film: Cinema in Context. University of Hawaii Press, Honolulu 2006, ISBN 082482993X, page 11.
