= Dogs in religion =

Domestic dogs (Canis familiaris) have held significant and diverse roles in the religions and mythologies of numerous cultures throughout human history. In the context of the history of religion, the roles of dogs range from symbolic representations of virtues like loyalty and protection to teachings about purity and ritual practices. In Animals and World Religion, animal ethicist Lisa Kemmerer explores the relationship between animals and global religious traditions. The work examines how different religions perceive and engage with animals, emphasizing their roles in religious narratives and rituals and highlighting the connection between humans and animals in spiritual contexts.

In mythology, dogs often served in companion and protective roles, such as guarding the gates of the underworld in Indo-European mythologies. Historian Julien d'Huy identifies a common set of three narratives about dogs that appear in various religious traditions. The first narrative emphasizes a connection to the afterlife, reflecting the gatekeeping role often seen in Indo-European mythologies. The second narrative focuses on the bond between humans and dogs, while the third pertains to the association of dogs with the star Sirius. Evidence presented by d'Huy suggests an association between the mythological records from various cultures and the genetic and fossil records related to dog domestication.

== Aztec religion ==
Dogs had a major religious and symbolic significance to the Aztec peoples of central Mexico. Several ancient burial sites for dogs have been discovered in Mexico. Xolotl, an Aztec god of death, was depicted as a dog-headed monster.

== Chinese tradition ==
The dog is one of the 12 animals honoured in Chinese astrology. The second day of the Chinese New Year is considered to be the birthday of all dogs, and Chinese people often take care to be kind to dogs on that day. In China, Korea, and Japan, dogs are viewed as kind protectors. Panhu is a dragon-dog who transformed into a man and married a princess.

Dogs have a significant presence in Chinese tradition and folklore, not only in astrology and mythology but also in religious and cultural aspects. Here are additional information about the role of dogs within Chinese tradition:

- Guardians of temples and homes: Dogs have been regarded as protectors and guardians in the Chinese culture. They are often depicted at the entrances of temples, homes, and other essential settings. In Chinese folk religion, it is believed that dogs have the ability to ward off evil spirits and protect against negative energies. This tradition of utilizing dogs as protectors is deeply ingrained in Chinese culture that emphasizes their role as symbols of loyalty and vigilance.
- According to an article by Henrieta Hatalova, the popular allegory of Zhuangzi asserts that "The dog is not regarded as good according to its good barking, so the man is not considered virtuous and able according to his nice words."

In spite of the positive judgements of dogs in the Chinese tradition, dogs were previously banned from China for over 60 years before June 1928. Robert A. Bickers and Jeffrey N. Wasserstrom mentioned that "The potency of 'dog' as an insulting and dehumanizing epithet in China undoubtedly exacerbated the insult, and also made the story of the sign's outrageous wording seem all the more plausible".

== Christianity ==
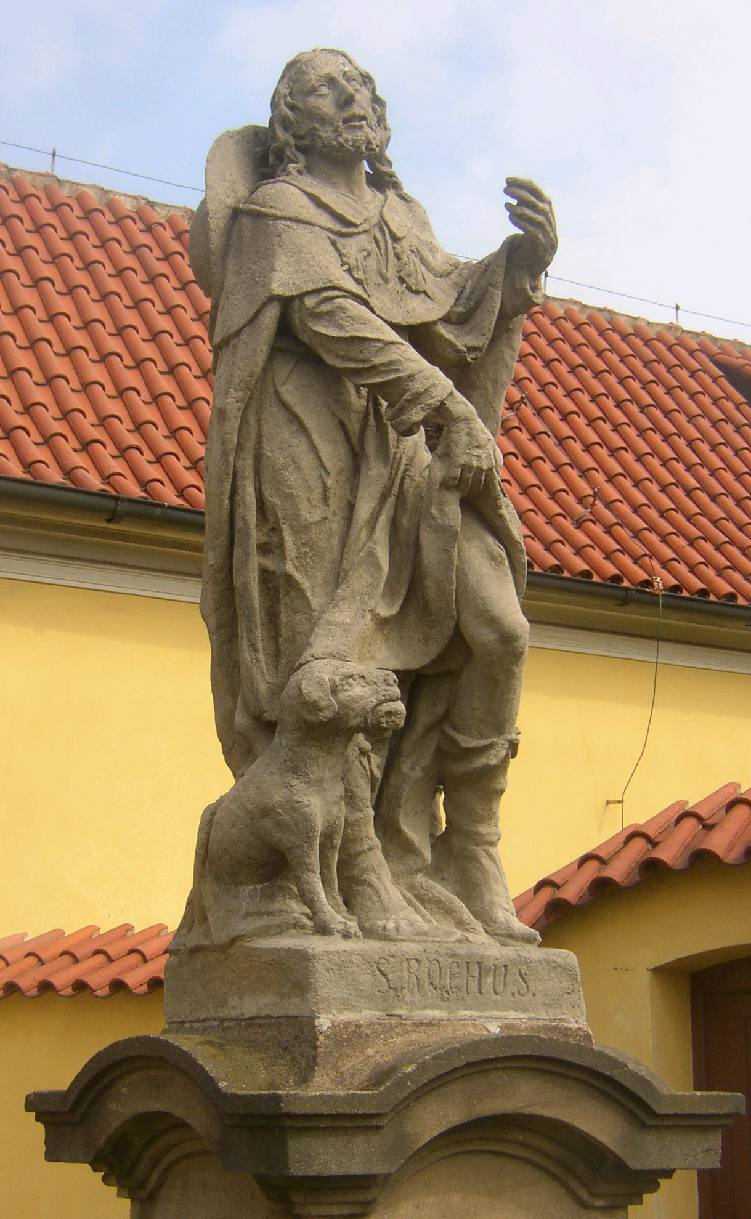
Statue of Saint Roch with his dog, in Prague, Czech Republic.

In Christianity, dogs are mentioned in the narrative about the rich man and Lazarus, in which dogs were viewed as bringing healing (as they licked the wounds of Lazarus). The academic Justin David Strong notes that "this act would have been perceived by a first-century audience as a sign of sympathy from the dogs, who have been caring after Lazarus as though his nurses." The Book of Tobit, which is found in the Apocrypha section of Lutheran and Anglican Bibles, as well as in the Old Testament of the Catholic Bible, notes that a dog faithfully accompanies Tobias and the archangel Raphael on their journeys.

In Christian folklore, a church grim often takes the form of a black dog to guard churches and churchyards from sacrilege.

=== Roman Catholicism ===
Within Roman Catholicism specifically, the iconography of Saint Dominic includes a dog, after the saint's mother Blessed Joan of Aza dreamt a dog with a torch in its mouth sprang from her womb, and became pregnant shortly after that. As such, the Dominican Order (Ecclesiastical Latin: Dominicanus) sounds close to "dog of the Lord" or "hound of the Lord" (Dómini canis).

The Catholic Church recognizes Saint Roch (also Saint Rocco), who lived in the early 14th century in France, as the patron saint of dogs. It is said he caught the plague while doing charitable work and went into the forest, expecting to die. There, he was befriended by a hunting dog which licked his sores and brought him food, helping him recover. The feast day of Saint Roch, August 16, is celebrated in Bolivia as the "birthday of all dogs."

Saint Guinefort was the name given to a dog which was venerated as a folk saint at a French shrine from the 13th century to the 20th century, when the Church suppressed its cult.

In 2017, a Franciscan friary in Cochabamba, Bolivia, adopted a stray schnauzer dog, naming him "Friar Carmelo". Photos of Friar Carmelo, nicknamed "Fray Bigotón" ("Friar Moustache") and dressed in a miniature Franciscan habit, went viral on the Internet. His son, Metodio, and a ginger cat named "Fray Michi", have also been adopted by the monastery.

== Ancient Egyptian religion ==
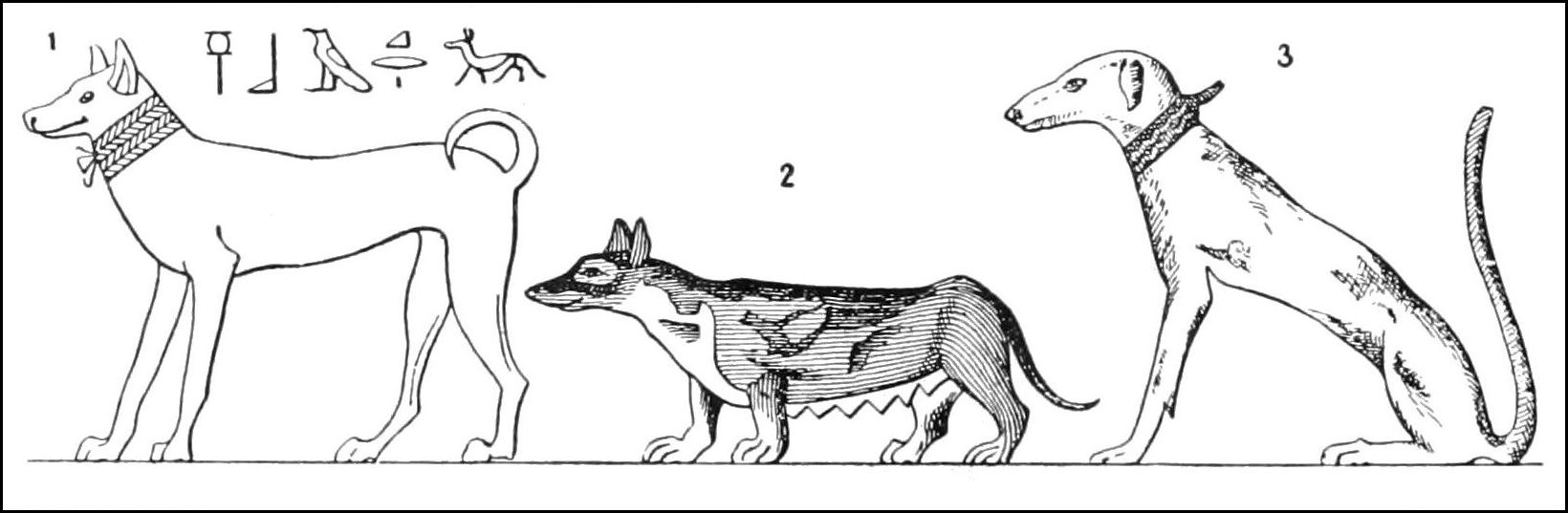
Dogs from Ancient Egypt

The Ancient Egyptians are often more associated with cats in the form of Bastet, but dogs are found to have a sacred role and figure as an important symbol in religious iconography.

Dogs were associated with Anubis, the jackal headed god of the underworld. At times throughout its period of being in use the Anubieion catacombs at Saqqara saw the burial of dogs. Anput was the female counterpart of her husband, Anubis; she was often depicted as a pregnant or nursing jackal, or as a jackal wielding knives.

Other dogs can be found in Egyptian mythology. Am-heh was a minor god from the underworld. He was depicted as a man with the head of a hunting dog who lived in a lake of fire. Duamutef was originally represented as a man wrapped in mummy bandages. From the New Kingdom onwards, he is shown with the head of a jackal. Wepwawet was depicted as a wolf or a jackal, or as a man with the head of a wolf or a jackal. Even when considered a jackal, Wepwawet usually was shown with grey, or white fur, reflecting his lupine origins. Khenti-Amentiu was depicted as a jackal-headed deity at Abydos in Upper Egypt, who stood guard over the city of the dead.

The historical connection between dogs and religion traces back to some of the earliest civilizations known to humanity. In ancient Egypt, dogs were revered and associated with Anubis, the god of mummification and the afterlife, often depicted with a canine head. This association reflects the belief in the dog's ability to guide souls to the afterlife. Sir Ernest Alfred Wallis Budge explains that, "Egypt primitive man must have worshipped animals ... because they possessed strength, and power, and cunning greater than his own, or because they were endowed with some quality which enabled them to do him bodily harm or to cause his death". This insight into the ancient Egyptian mindset offers a glimpse into the reasons why certain animals, including dogs, held significant roles in their religious practices, shedding light on the cultural and spiritual dynamics that underlie the historical connection between dogs and religion.

== Greek mythology ==
Dogs were closely associated with Hecate in the Classical world. Dogs were sacred to Artemis and Ares. Cerberus is a three-headed, dragon-tailed watchdog who guards the gates of Hades. Laelaps was a dog in Greek mythology. When Zeus was a baby, a dog, known only as the "golden hound" protected the goat, Almatheia, who nursed the future King of Gods. In Homer's epic poem the Odyssey, when the disguised Odysseus returns home after 20 years, he is recognized only by his faithful dog, Argos, who has been waiting all this time for his return.

Based on Greek mythology, three of the 88 constellations in Western astronomy also represent dogs:

- Canis Major (the Great Dog, whose brightest star, Sirius, is also called the Dog Star)
- Canis Minor (the Little Dog)
- Canes Venatici (the Hunting Dogs)

== Hinduism ==
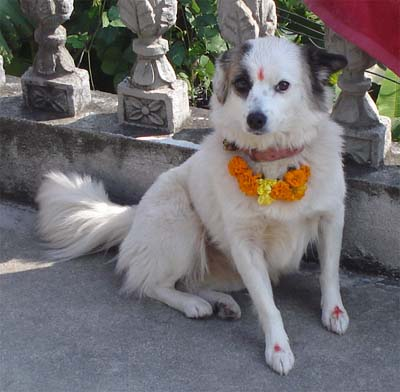
Kukur Tihar is a Nepali Hindu festival that honours dogs.

In Hindu mythology, Yama, the god of death, owns two watchdogs who have four eyes. They are said to watch over the gates of Naraka. The hunter god Muthappan from the North Malabar region of Kerala has a hunting dog as his mount. Dogs are found in and out of the Muthappan Temple and offerings at the shrine take the form of bronze dog figurines.

The dog (shvana) is also the vahana or mount of the Hindu god Bhairava.

In the Mahabharata, when Yudhishthira reaches the gates of heaven (Svarga), Indra allows him to enter but refuses entry to the dog that accompanied him. Yudhishthira, unwilling to abandon his loyal companion, refuses to enter heaven without the dog. Impressed by Yudhishthira's unwavering loyalty towards those who didn't leave him, Indra finally allowed the dog to enter heaven with Yudhishthira.

Dogs are also depicted in the iconography of Hindu deities such as Dattatreya and Khandoba. The Ramayana contains a tale about a dog receiving justice, passed by Rama.

== Islam ==
The view on dogs in Islam is mixed, with some schools of thought viewing their saliva as unclean.

The majority of both Sunni (except for the Maliki school) and Shi'a Muslim jurists consider dogs ritually saliva unclean. It is uncommon for practicing Muslims to keep dogs as pets. However, the majority of Muslims would touch and pet dogs as long as they are completely dry because touching dry dogs is believed to remove impurities from them. In Britain, police sniffer dogs are carefully used, and they are not permitted to touch passengers, instead, they are only permitted to touch their luggage. They are required to wear leather dog booties whenever they are inside the Muslim homes, and also for when they enter and search mosques.

There are a number of traditions concerning Muhammad's attitude towards dogs. According to one hadith presented in Muwatta Imam Malik, he said that the company of dogs, except as helpers in hunting, herding, and home protection, voided a portion of a Muslim's good deeds. On the other hand, he advocated kindness to dogs and other animals. Abu Huraira narrated that the prophet said:

While a man was walking he felt thirsty and went down a well, and drank water from it. On coming out of it, he saw a dog panting and eating mud because of excessive thirst. The man said, "This (dog) is suffering from the same problem as that of mine." So, he (went down the well), filled his shoe with water, caught hold of it with his teeth, and climbed up and watered the dog. Allah thanked him for his (good) deed and forgave him. The people asked "O Allah's Apostle! Is there a reward for us in serving (the) animals?" He replied: "Yes, there is a reward for serving any animate (living being)."

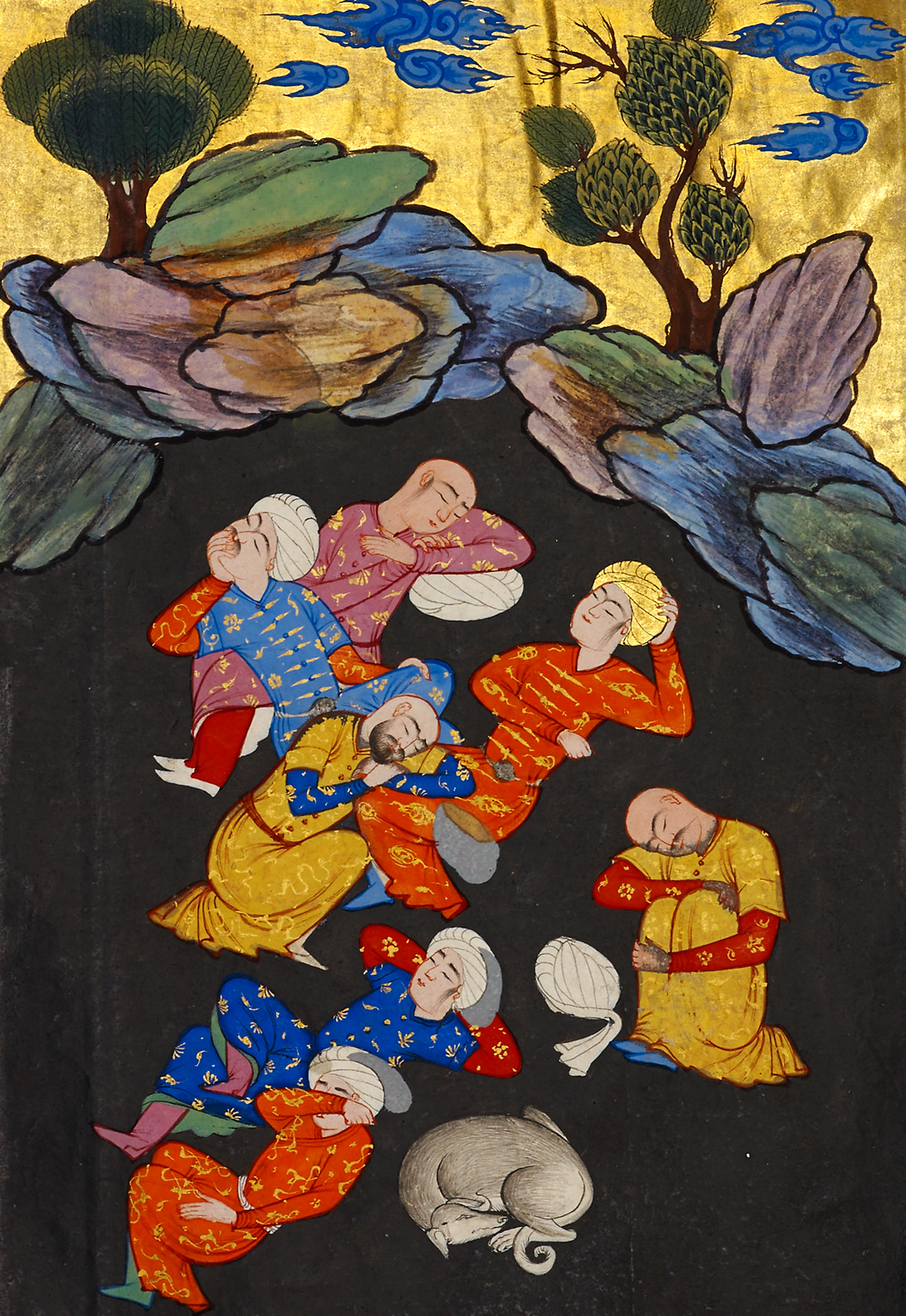
Islamic Persian miniature of the Sleepers from a 1577 Stories of the Prophets manuscript; Qitmir is at the bottom of the image.

The historical relationship between dogs and Islam is complex and influenced by cultural, rather than purely religious, factors. However, not all of these factors are aligned with the core teachings of Islam. For instance, the negative perception of dogs in some Islamic societies can be traced back to pre-Islamic Arab traditions and mythologies. Some Arab tribes believed that contact with dogs could render a person ritually impure or bring bad luck. However, when Islam emerged, it introduced a new religious and ethical framework to the region. While there are Hadiths that mention restrictions on keeping dogs as pets or associating with them, these hadiths have been interpreted and debated by various scholars and Islamic schools of thought. In the context of Islam, dogs are considered najis (ritually impure) by some scholars, but this view is not universally accepted. A research conducted by Vera Subasi quoted that "A state-appointed mufti or self-appointed imam was declaring that dogs were impure animals and people that were sick of the high dog population in their town or village due to unwanted litters were shooting or poisoning them". However, in a journal by Jenny Berglund, it is asserted that "There are signs that attitudes toward dogs are changing in some Muslim societies. One such sign is that an increasing number of people in Muslim countries are now keeping dogs as companion animals". There is a diversity of opinions among Islamic jurists, and many Muslims interact with dogs and other animals while observing hygiene practices. Moreover, other Hadiths and Islamic teachings emphasize the importance of compassion and kindness toward animals, including dogs.

There is a dog mentioned in the Quran called Qitmir. He was the dog that guarded the People of the Cave and stood by them all through their long sleep.

== Judaism ==
There is controversy about whether Jewish rabbinical law authorizes the keeping of dogs as pets. Biblical and rabbinic sources include numerous references that associate dogs with violence and uncleanliness and frown on having dogs as pets or keeping them in one’s home. Dogs are negatively portrayed in both the Hebrew Bible and the Talmud, where they are mostly associated with violence and uncleanliness. Deuteronomy 23:18 appears to equate dogs with prostitution, and the Book of Kings describes dogs who feed on corpses. The Psalms describes dogs as beasts that maul at human beings.

This negative view of dogs is also found in the Talmud, which describes people who raise dogs as cursed. In July 2019, all the Sephardic Rabbis from the Israeli city of Elad signed an edict banning dogs from the city, with the justification that "as explained in the Talmud and by the Rambam, anyone raising a dog is accursed". At the same year, the rabbi of Holon, Avraham Yosef, was also quoted as saying: “I do not find any grounds for permitting any dog whatsoever in any manner”.

The Misneh Torah states that dogs must be chained because they are known to frequently cause damage. The Shulchan Aruch states that only evil dogs must be bound and chained. 18th-century Rabbi and talmudist Jacob Emden permitted dogs for economic or security reasons, but affirmed that having a dog merely for pleasure was “precisely the behavior of the uncircumcised”.

Judaism does not permit the neglect or abuse of any living animal. Jewish law states that any animal that is kept must be fed, and it also states that arrangements for feeding them must be made before they are obtained. This ruling also applies to dogs.

Although there are negative references to dogs in biblical and rabbinic sources, the Jewish perspective on dogs is multifaceted. While dogs are associated with violence and uncleanliness in some passages, these depictions are not all-encompassing. The complexities of these attitudes by discussing how specific interpretations and cultural factors influenced the perception of dogs over time. According to Ackerman-Lieberman and his fellow scholars, Jewish law prohibits neglect or abuse of any living animal, including dogs, and underscores the importance of proper care and responsibility for animals within the Jewish community. Kenneth Stow informs in his book some sayings about the imagery of dogs in the Jewish community. He mentioned, "The metaphor of the Jewish dog and its accompanying anxiety, which pictured this dog as a threat, had taken hold". Moreover, sentences like "returning to their vomit [like a dog]" and "dogs mutilated the victim's body" also resembles the nasty habits of a dog, and so negative judgements as well.

== Levant ==
During archaeological diggings, the Ashkelon dog cemetery was discovered in the layer dating from when the city was part of the Persian Empire. It is believed the dogs may have had a sacred role – however, evidence for this is not conclusive.

== Mesopotamia ==
In ancient Mesopotamia, from the Old Babylonian period until the Neo-Babylonian, dogs were the symbol of Ninisina, the goddess of healing and medicine, and her worshippers frequently dedicated small models of seated dogs to her. In the Neo-Assyrian and Neo-Babylonian periods, dogs were used as emblems of magical protection.

There is a temple in Isin, Mesopotamia, named é-ur-gi7-ra which translates as "dog house". Enlilbani, a king from the Old Babylonian First Dynasty of Isin, commemorated the temple to the goddess Ninisina. Although there is a small amount of detail known about it, there is enough information to confirm that a dog cult did exist in this area. Usually, dogs were only associated with the Gula cult, but there is some information, like Enlilbani's commemoration, to suggest that dogs were also important to the cult of Ninisina, as Gula was another goddess who was closely associated to Ninisina. More than 30 dog burials, numerous dog sculptures, and dog drawings were discovered when the area around this Ninisina temple was excavated. In the Gula cult, the dog was used in oaths and was sometimes referred to as a divinity. Similar as the ancient Egypt's relationship of dogs in religion, in ancient Mesopotamia, the goddess Gula was symbolized by a dog, emphasizing the animal's role in healing and protection. The ancient Greeks also had their own canine deity, Hecate, associated with magic, crossroads, and the underworld. These early religious associations highlighted dogs' roles as protectors, guides, and guardians of the spiritual realm, emphasizing their perceived spiritual significance. Moreover, the study by Robert Rollinger and fellow scholars asserts that "it [dogs] became the emblem of the goddess of healing". Despite the fact that some associations believe dogs as beneficial to them, some thinks the opposite. A. R. George informs that "The divine addressee is eulogized with conventional epithets, asked to accept a food-offering, begged to show kindness to the field in which the exorcist is evidently standing, and encouraged to get rid of the Dogs of Ninkilim". Moreover, Robert Rollinger and his fellow scholars also noted that, "Sumerian and Akkadian texts often depict the dog in a very negative way, presenting it as a dangerous and unpredictable animal". Dogs were symbolized to be the cause of horror or disadvantage in nature.

In Persian mythology, two four-eyed dogs guard the Chinvat Bridge.

== Norse mythology ==
In Norse mythology, a bloody, four-eyed dog called Garmr guards Helheim. Also, Fenrir is a giant wolf who is a child of the Norse god Loki, who was foretold to kill Odin in the events of Ragnarok.

== Philippine mythology ==
In Philippine mythology, Kaimat, the pet of Tadaklan, the god of thunder, is responsible for lightning.

== Welsh mythology ==
In Welsh mythology, Annwn is guarded by Cŵn Annwn.

== Zoroastrianism ==
In Zoroastrianism, the dog is regarded as an especially beneficent, clean and righteous creature, which must be fed and taken care of. The dog is praised for the useful work it performs in the household, but it is also seen as having special spiritual virtues. Dogs are associated with Yama who guards the gates of afterlife with his dogs just like Hinduism. A dog's gaze is considered to be purifying and to drive off daevas (demons). It is also believed to have a special connection with the afterlife: the Chinwad Bridge to Heaven is said to be guarded by dogs in Zoroastrian scripture, and dogs are traditionally fed in commemoration of the dead. Ihtiram-i sag, "respect for the dog", is a common injunction among Iranian Zoroastrian villagers.

Detailed prescriptions for the appropriate treatment of dogs are found in the Vendidad (a subdivision of the Zoroastrian holy scripture Avesta), especially in chapters 13, 14 and 15, where harsh punishments are imposed for harm inflicted upon a dog and the faithful are required to assist dogs, both domestic and stray, in various ways; often, help or harm to a dog is equated with help and harm to a human. The killing of a dog ("a shepherd's dog, or a house-dog, or a Vohunazga [i.e. stray] dog, or a trained dog") is considered to lead to damnation in the afterlife. A homeowner is required to take care of a pregnant dog that lies near his home at least until the puppies are born (and in some cases until the puppies are old enough to take care of themselves, namely six months). If the homeowner does not help the dog and the puppies come to harm as a result, "he shall pay for it the penalty for wilful murder", because "Atar (Fire), the son of Ahura Mazda, watches as well (over a pregnant dog) as he does over a woman". It is also a major sin if a man harms a dog by giving it bones that are too hard and become stuck in its throat, or food that is too hot, so that it burns its throat. Giving bad food to a dog is as bad as serving bad food to a human. The believers are required to take care of a dog with a damaged sense of smell, to try to heal it "in the same manner as they would do for one of the faithful" and, if they fail, to tie it lest it should fall into a hole or a body of water and be harmed.

Both according to the Vendidad and in traditional Zoroastrian practice, dogs are allotted some funerary ceremonies analogous to those of humans. In the Vendidad, it is stated that the spirits of a thousand deceased dogs are reincarnated in a single otter ("water dog"), hence the killing of an otter is a terrible crime that brings drought and famine upon the land and must be atoned either by the death of the killer or by the killer performing a very long list of deeds considered pious, including the healing of dogs, raising of puppies, paying of fines to priests, as well as killing of animals considered noxious and unholy (cats, rats, mice and various species of reptiles, amphibians, and insects).

Sagdid is a funeral ceremony in which a dog is brought into the room where the body is lying so that it can look on it. "Sagdid" means "dog sight" in the Middle Persian language of Zoroastrian theological works. There are various spiritual benefits thought to be obtained by the ceremony. It is believed that the original purpose was to make certain that the person was really dead since the dog's more acute senses would be able to detect signs of life that a human might miss. A "four-eyed" dog, that is one with two spots on its forehead, is preferred for sagdid.

The traditional rites involving dogs have been under attack by reformist Zoroastrians since the mid-19th century, and they had abandoned them completely by the late 20th century. Even traditionalist Zoroastrians tend to restrict such rites to a significant extent nowadays (late 20th – early 21st century).

== Contemporary perspectives ==
Contemporary perspectives on dogs in various religions today reflect a diversity of attitudes and practices. While many religious traditions continue to hold nuanced views on dogs, there are instances of evolving and more inclusive interpretations. For instance, in Islam, some Muslims have become more receptive to dogs as pets, recognizing the importance of compassion and kindness to animals as emphasized in the Quran and Hadith. In Judaism, the negative portrayals of dogs in earlier texts are tempered by an awareness of the responsibility for proper care and treatment of animals.

== See also ==
- All Dogs Go to Heaven
- The Hound of the Baskervilles
- Amarok/Amaguq (Inuit mythology)
- Anubis
- Barghest (Yorkshire)
- Black dog (ghost) (Britain)
- Black Shuck (East Anglia)
- Cerberus
- Chinese guardian liondogs
- Church Grim (England)
- Coyote (mythology) Coyote (Navajo mythology)
- Cultural depictions of dogs
- The dingo in Aboriginal folklore and mythology
- Dip (Catalonia)
- Dog (zodiac)
- Dog in Chinese mythology
- Dogs in warfare
- Gwyllgi (Wales)
- Gytrash (Northern England)
- Hellhound
- Hound of Culann
- Inugami
- Yama-Inu (also see the Japanese wolf).
- Moddey Dhoo (Mauthe Doog) (Manx)
- Temple of the Eighteen Lords (Taiwan)
- The dogs of war (phrase)
- Tokugawa Tsunayoshi (the "Dog Shōgun")
- Wolves in folklore, religion and mythology
