= Church grim =

Mythical churchyard-guardian spirit-animal

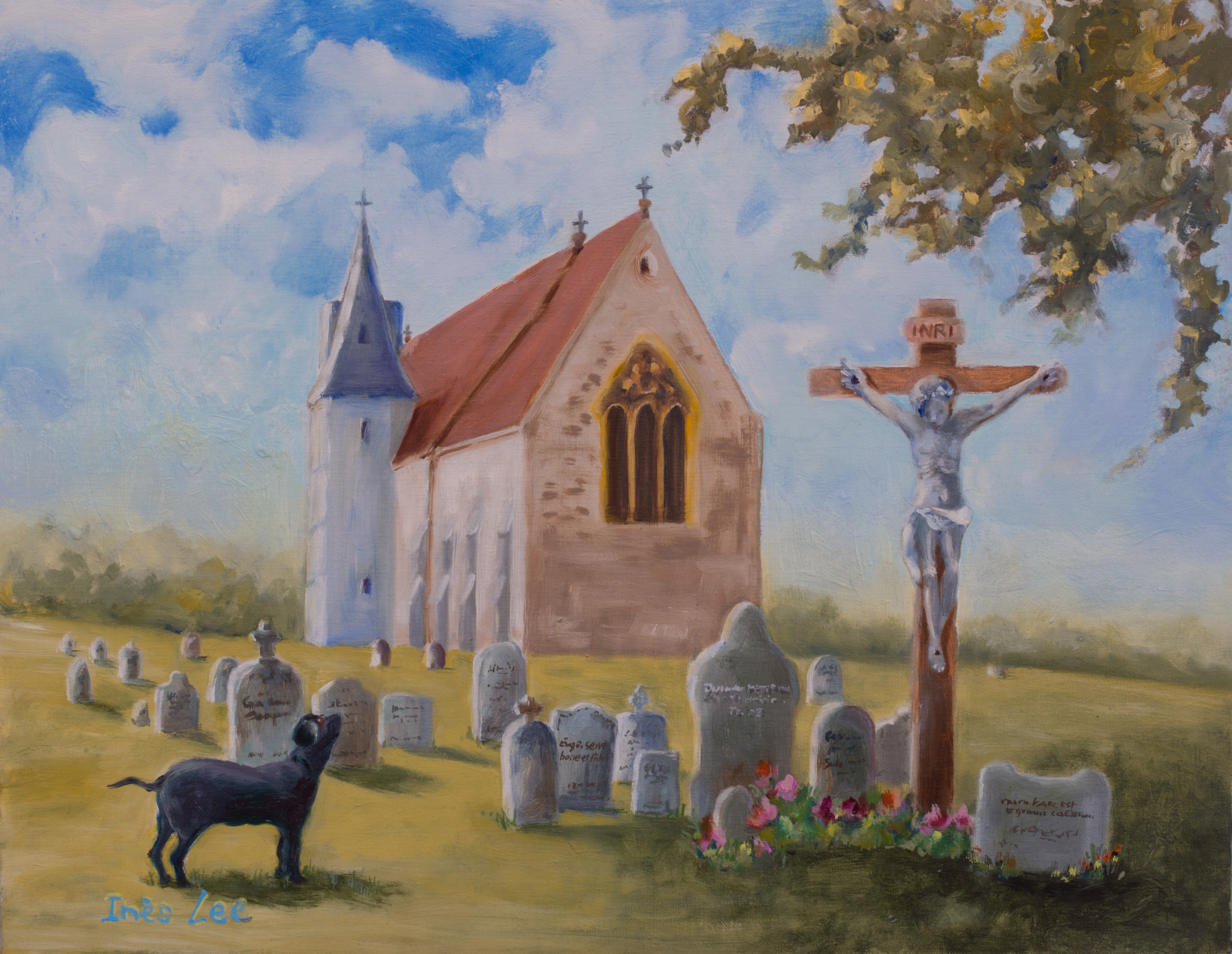
Impression of a church grim (at left)

The church grim is a guardian spirit in Scottish, English and Nordic folklore that oversees the welfare of a particular Christian church, and protects the churchyard from those who would profane and commit sacrilege against it. It often appears as a black dog but is known to take the form of other animals.

== English folklore ==
The English church grim usually takes the form of a large black dog with red eyes and guards churchyards from those who would profane them, including thieves, vandals, witches, warlocks, and the Devil himself. In the 19th century, folklorists believed that it had once been the custom to bury a dog alive under the cornerstone of a church as a foundation sacrifice so that its ghost might serve as a guardian.

Like many spectral black dogs, the grim, according to Yorkshire tradition, is also an ominous warning and is known to toll the church bell at midnight before a death takes place. During funerals, the presiding clergy may see the grim looking out from the church tower and determine from its aspect whether the soul of the deceased is destined for Heaven or Hell. The grim inhabits the churchyard day and night and is associated with dark stormy weather.

When a new churchyard was opened, it was believed that the first person buried there had to guard it against the Devil. To prevent a human soul from having to perform such a duty, a black dog was buried in the north part of the churchyard as a substitute.

A folktale of the Devil's Bridge type is also an example of the motif of a dog (in this case, a dog also named Grim) being sacrificed in place of a human being. In the North Riding of Yorkshire, attempts were made to build a bridge that could withstand the floods' fury, but none succeeded. The Devil promised to build one on condition that the first living creature that crossed it should serve as a sacrifice. When the bridge was complete, the people gave long consideration as to who should be the victim. A shepherd who owned a dog named Grim swam across the river then whistled for Grim to follow, who went over the bridge and became the Devil's sacrifice. The bridge then became known as Kilgrim Bridge and was later renamed Kilgram Bridge, which today crosses the River Ure in North Yorkshire.

== Scottish folklore ==
According to a related belief in Scotland, the spirit of the person most recently buried in a churchyard had to protect it until the next funeral provided a new guardian to replace them. This churchyard vigil was known as the faire chlaidh or "graveyard watch" and fights have been noted to have ensued when two funeral parties met as to who would be buried first as the second would take watch. These spirits have been described in many ways including a moving flame that paces the graveyard day and night.

== Scandinavian folklore ==
The Scandinavian church grim is also known as the Kyrkogrim (Swedish), Kirkonväki (Finnish), and Kirkegrim (Danish) is likewise defined as the protective revenant of an animal buried alive in the church foundation. In Sweden, this tradition is mainly found in the formerly Danish areas in the south (Scania, Halland, and Blekinge).

It dwells in the church tower or some other place of concealment, wanders the grounds at night, and is tasked with protecting the sacred building. It keeps order in the church and punishes those who perpetrate scandals.

It is said that the first founders of Christian churches would bury a lamb ("church-lamb") under the altar. When a person enters the church when services are not being held, he may see the lamb, and if it appears in the graveyard (especially to the gravedigger), then it portends the death of a child. In some tellings, the lamb is said to have only three legs.

The lamb is meant to represent Christ (the Lamb of God) as the sacred cornerstone of the church, imparting security and longevity to the physical edifice and congregation. Other animals used to create the church grim included a lamb, boar, pig, and horse. A grave-sow (or "graysow"), the ghost of a sow buried alive, was often seen in the streets of Kroskjoberg where it was regarded as an omen of death.

There are tales of the Danish Kirkegrim and its battles with the Strand-varsler that tried to enter the churchyard. Strand-varsler are the spirits of those who die at sea, are washed up on the shore, and remain unburied.

In Swedish tradition, a person attempting the Årsgång, or year walk, a divination ritual that involved circling a churchyard on New Year's Eve, would have to contend with the church grim, which was the natural enemy of the year-walker.

== In popular culture ==
The Last of the Giant Killers published in 1891, includes a story where Jack the Giant Killer defeats an evil church grim that takes the shape of a goat. In this tale, Jack is helped by the ghost of a young woman who, like the church grim, was buried alive as a foundation sacrifice.

"The Church-grim" by Eden Phillpotts is a short story published in the September 1914 edition of The Century Magazine, New York.

In the novel Harry Potter and the Prisoner of Azkaban by J. K. Rowling, the Divination teacher, Sybill Trelawney, associates Harry's tea leaves with the Grim, which she calls a "giant spectral dog that haunts churchyards."

The character "Ruth" in The Ancient Magus' Bride manga and anime series is a church grim.

In the mobile game Year Walk, the player's task is to reach the church and consult a church grim to see what the future holds.

In the subsequent Year Walk: Bedtime Stories for Awful Children, the fifth chapter is devoted to the Church Grimm.

== See also ==
- Amarok
- Animals in Christian art
- Anubis
- Barghest
- Black dog (folklore)
- Black Shuck
- Cerberus
- Chinese guardian lions
- Coyote (mythology)
- Dip (Catalan myth)
- Dog (zodiac)
- Dog in Chinese mythology
- Dogs in religion
- Gwyllgi
- Gytrash
- Hellhound
- Inugami
- Moddey Dhoo
- Warg
- Wolves in folklore, religion and mythology
- Yama-Inu
