= Hellhound =

Supernatural dog associated with Hell or the underworld

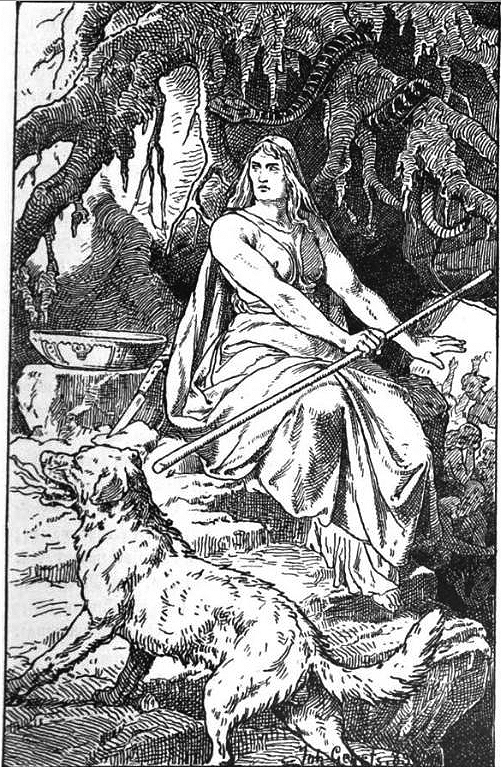
Goddess Hel and the hellhound Garmr by Johannes Gehrts, 1889

A hellhound is a mythological hound that embodies a guardian or a servant of hell, the devil, or the underworld. Hellhounds occur in mythologies around the world, with the best-known examples being Cerberus from Greek mythology, Garmr from Norse mythology, the black dogs of English folklore, and the fairy hounds of Celtic mythology. Physical characteristics vary, but they are commonly black, anomalously overgrown, supernaturally strong, and often have red eyes or are accompanied by flames. The behaviors of a Hellhound are very calculated and purposeful, and they are said to be highly intelligent.

== By locale ==
=== Europe ===
==== Albania ====
In Albanian mythology, a three-headed dog, who never sleeps, guards the gates of the underworld. In some folktales, it appears as the guard of the palace of E Bukura e Dheut in the underworld.

==== Belgium ====
Oude Rode Ogen ("Old Red Eyes"), or the "Beast of Flanders", was a demon reported in Flanders, Belgium, in the 18th century who would take the form of a large black hound with fiery red eyes. In Wallonia, the southern region of Belgium, folktales mentioned the Tchén al tchinne ("Chained Hound" in Walloon), a hellhound with a long chain that was thought to roam in the fields at night.

==== Czech lands ====
Numerous sightings of hellhounds persist throughout the Czech lands.

==== France ====
In France, in AD 856, a black hound was said to materialize in a church even though the doors were shut. The church grew dark as it padded up and down the aisle as if looking for someone. The dog then vanished as suddenly as it had appeared. On mainland Normandy, the Rongeur d'Os wanders the streets of Bayeux on winter nights as a phantom dog, gnawing on bones and dragging chains along with it. In Lower Brittany, there are stories of a ghost ship crewed by the souls of criminals with hellhounds set to guard them and inflict on them a thousand tortures.

==== Germany ====
In Germany, it was believed that the devil would appear as a black hellhound, especially on Walpurgisnacht.

==== Greece ====
In Greek mythology, Cerberus, often referred to as the hound of Hades, is a multi-headed dog that guards the gates of the Underworld to prevent the dead from leaving. He was the offspring of the monsters Echidna and Typhon and was usually described as having three heads, a serpent for a tail, and snakes protruding from multiple parts of his body.

==== Scandinavia ====
In Norse mythology, Garmr or Garm (Old Norse for "rag") is a wolf or dog associated with both the Goddess Hel and Ragnarök and described as a blood-stained guardian of Hel's gate.

==== Catalonia ====
In Catalan myth, Dip is an evil, black, hairy hound, an emissary of the Devil, who sucks people's blood. Like other figures associated with demons in Catalan myth, he is lame in one leg. Dip is pictured on the escutcheon of Pratdip.

==== Galicia ====
In Galicia, the Urco was a giant black hound that led the Santa Compaña, a version of the Wild Hunt.

===== Canary Islands =====
In the religious beliefs of the Guanche people of the Canary Islands, the Tibicenas were the canine offspring or attendants of the malevolent volcano deity Guayota.

==== United Kingdom ====
===== England =====
The myth is common across Great Britain in the form of the "black dogs" of English folklore. The earliest written record of the "hellhound" is in the 11th- and 12th-century Peterborough version of the Anglo-Saxon Chronicle, which speaks of a "wild hunt" through the forest between Peterborough and Stamford.

===== Wales =====
The gwyllgi (compound noun of either gwyllt "wild" or gwyll "twilight" + ci "dog") is a mythical black dog from Wales that appears as an English Mastiff with baleful breath and blazing red eyes.

====== Cŵn Annwn ======
In Welsh mythology and folklore, Cŵn Annwn (/ˌkuːn ˈænʊn/; "hounds of Annwn") were the spectral hounds of Annwn, the otherworld of Welsh myth. They were associated with a form of the Wild Hunt, presided over by Gwynn ap Nudd (rather than Arawn, king of Annwn in the First Branch of the Mabinogi). Christians came to dub these mythical creatures "The Hounds of Hell" or "Dogs of Hell" and theorized Satan owned them. However, the Annwn of medieval Welsh tradition is an otherworldly paradise and not a hell or abode of dead souls.

In Wales, they were associated with migrating geese, supposedly because their honking in the night is reminiscent of barking dogs. They are supposed to hunt on specific nights (the eves of St. John, St. Martin, Saint Michael the Archangel, All Saints, Christmas, New Year, Saint Agnes, Saint David, and Good Friday) or simply in the autumn and winter. Some say Arawn only hunts from Christmas to Twelfth Night. The Cŵn Annwn also came to be regarded as the escorts of souls on their journey to the Otherworld. The hounds are sometimes accompanied by a fearsome hag called Mallt-y-Nos, "Matilda of the Night". An alternative name in Welsh folklore is Cŵn Mamau, the "Hounds of the Mothers".

==== European Demonology ====
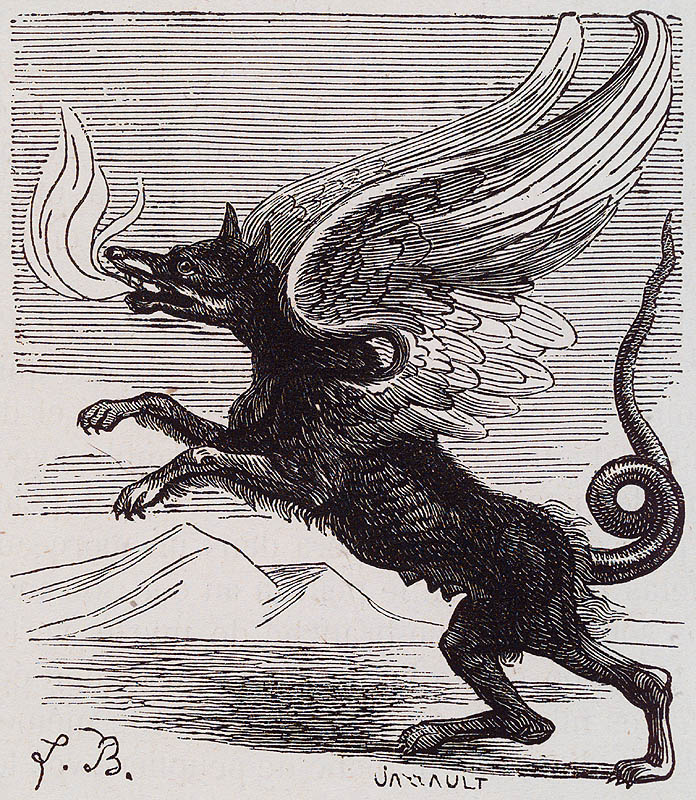
Marchosias appears as a fire-breathing canine with a serpent's tail, characteristics frequently associated with hellhounds.

The Dictionnaire Infernal and The Lesser Key of Solomon are books on demonology written and compiled by multiple European occultists spanning from medieval to Renaissance periods. Several dog-like or wolf-like demons are described, consistently Marchosias, Glasya-Labolas and Naberius. Hounds of monstrous or infernal attributes may also appear as the steeds of demons (as described by Andras' entry) or as alternate forms taken by demons in (such as Aamon).

=== America ===
==== Latin America ====
Black hellhounds with fiery eyes are reported throughout Latin America from Mexico to Argentina under a variety of names, including the Perro Negro (Spanish for "black dog"), Nahual (Mexico), Huay Chivo, and Huay Pek (Mexico)—alternatively spelled Uay/Way/Waay Chivo/Pek, Cadejo (Central America), the dog Familiar (Argentina) and the Lobizon (Paraguay and Argentina). They are usually said to be either incarnations of the Devil or shape-changing sorcerer.

==== United States ====
The legend of a hellhound has persisted in Meriden, Connecticut, since the 19th century. The dog is said to haunt the Hanging Hills, a series of rock ridges and gorges that serve as a popular recreation area and can also be known as a protector of the supernatural. The first non-local account came from W. H. C. Pychon in The Connecticut Quarterly, in which it is described as a death omen. It is said, "If you meet the Black Dog once, it shall be for joy; if twice, it shall be for sorrow; and the third time shall bring death."

Additionally, the term is common in American blues music, such as in Robert Johnson's 1937 song, "Hellhound on My Trail".

=== Asia ===
==== Arabia ====
Jinn, although not necessarily evil, but often thought of as malevolent entities, are thought to use black dogs as their mounts. The negative depiction of dogs likely derives from their close association with "eating the dead,' or relishing bones and digging out graves. Likewise, the jinn is often said to roam around graveyards and eat corpses.

==== China ====
The Huodou (Chinese: 祸斗) is a legendary creature originating within the minorities of southern China.

It is described as having the appearance of a large black dog that can emit flames from its mouth. Fire would break out wherever the Huodou went, so the ancients saw it as a sign of fire and often an ominous symbol. It is probably a demonized tribal symbol of southern China.

There is also Diting (谛听), a dog-like being affiliated with king Yama and Kṣitigarbha. He also makes an appearance in the novel, Journey to the West.

==== India ====
The Mahākanha Jātaka of the Buddhist Pali Canon includes a story about a black hound named Mahākanha (Pali; lit. "Great black"). Led by the god Śakra in the guise of a forester, Mahākanha scares unrighteous people toward righteousness so that fewer people will be reborn in hell.

His appearance portends the moral degeneration of the human world when monks and nuns do not behave as they should, and humanity has gone astray from ethical livelihood.

In Hinduism, Yama, the lord of death, has two dogs who guard the underworld. Their names are Sharvara and Shyama. The Nepali festival of Kukur Tihar, which brings dogs into temples to honor and consecrate them, is associated with this myth of Lord Yama and his two dogs.

==== Japan ====
In Japanese folklore, the Okuri-inu (送り犬) (lit. "escorting dog") is a yōkai that resembles a dog. The okuri-inu closely stalks and follows people walking along mountain paths in the nighttime. If the person falls over by chance, they will be immediately eaten up, but if they pretend to be having a short rest, they will not be attacked.

== See also ==
- Anubis
- Black Shuck (East Anglia)
- Cerberus
- Chinese guardian liondogs
- Church grim
- Coyote (mythology)
- Coyote (Navajo mythology)
- Devil Dog (Teufelhunde)
- Dip (Catalonia)
- Dog in Chinese mythology
- Dog (zodiac)
- Dogs in religion
- Fenrir
- Garmr
- Gwyllgi (Wales)
- Gytrash (Northern England)
- Inugami
- Okuri-inu
- Dingo § In Aboriginal folklore and mythology
- Tokugawa Tsunayoshi (the "Dog Shogun")
- Warg
