= Cŵn Annwn =

Welsh mythical creature

Creature information
- Other name(s): Hounds of Annwn, Cwn Annwfn
- Grouping: Legendary creature
- Sub grouping: Spirit
- Similar entities: Gabriel Hounds, Yell Hounds, Ratchets

Origin
- Country: Wales

In Welsh mythology and folklore, Cŵn Annwn (Welsh pronunciation: [kuːn ˈanʊn], "hounds of Annwn"), singular Ci Annwn (Welsh pronunciation: [kiː ˈanʊn]), were the spectral hounds of Annwn, the otherworld of Welsh myth. They were associated with a form of the Wild Hunt, presided over by either Arawn, king of Annwn in Pwyll Pendefig Dyfed (Pwyll, Prince of Dyfed), the First Branch of the Mabinogi and alluded to in Math fab Mathonwy (Math, the son of Mathonwy) the Fourth Branch of the Mabinogi, or by Gwyn ap Nudd as the underworld king and king of the fair(y) folk is named in later medieval lore.

In Wales, they were associated with migrating geese, supposedly because their honking in the night is reminiscent of barking dogs.

Hunting grounds for the Cŵn Annwn are said to include the mountain of Cadair Idris.

According to Welsh folklore, their growling is loudest when they are at a distance, and as they draw nearer, it grows softer and softer. Their coming is generally seen as a death portent.

== Owner ==
Arawn, king of Annwn, is believed to set the Cŵn Annwn loose to hunt mundane creatures. When Pwyll, Prince of Dyfed, saw the Cŵn Annwn take down a stag, he set his own pack of dogs to scare them away. Arawn then came to him and said that as repentance for driving away the Cŵn Annwn, Pwyll would have to defeat Hafgan.

The Annwn of medieval Welsh tradition is an otherworldly place of plenty and eternal youth and not a place of punishment like the Christian concept of Hell. Christians came to dub these mythical creatures as "The Hounds of Hell" or "Dogs of Hell" and theorised they were therefore owned by Satan.

The hounds are sometimes accompanied by a fearsome crone called Mallt-y-Nos, "Matilda of the Night". An alternative name in Welsh folklore is Cŵn Mamau ("Hounds of the Mothers").

Da Derga is also known to have a pack of nine white hounds, perhaps Cŵn Annwn.

Culhwch rode to King Arthur's court with two "Otherworld" dogs accompanying him, possibly Cŵn Annwn.

== The Wild Hunt ==
The Cŵn Annwn are associated with the Wild Hunt. They are supposed to hunt on specific nights (the eves of St. John, St. Martin, Saint Michael the Archangel, All Saints, Christmas, New Year, Saint Agnes, Saint David, and Good Friday), or just in the autumn and winter. Some say Arawn only hunts from Christmas to Twelfth Night. The Cŵn Annwn also came to be regarded as the escorts of souls on their journey to the Otherworld.

A Ci Annwn's goal in the Wild Hunt is to hunt wrongdoers into the ground until they can run no longer, just as the criminals did to their victims.

== Colouring and meaning ==
“For their hair was of a brilliant shining white, and their ears were red; and as the whiteness of their bodies shone, so did the redness of their ears glisten.” (First Branch, Mabinogi) Red is associated with vitality and strength whilst White is associated with the supernatural, and white animals are commonly owned by gods or other inhabitants of the Otherworld.

== Similar creatures ==
In other traditions similar spectral hounds are found, e.g. Gabriel Hounds (England), Ratchets (England), Yell Hounds (Isle of Man), related to Herne the Hunter's hounds, which form part of the Wild Hunt. Similar hounds occur in Devon – particularly on Dartmoor – and Cornwall but it is not clear whether they stem from Brythonic or Saxon origins.

== See also ==
- Barghest
- Black dog (folklore)
- Black Shuck
- Cu-sith
- Dip (Catalan myth)
- Gwyllgi
- Hound of the Baskervilles
- Huan
