= Raijū =

Japanese mythological creature

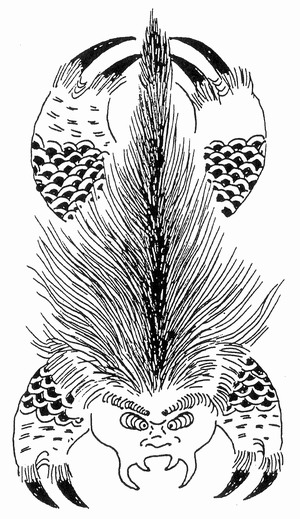
The Raijū as depicted in Ban Kōkē's Kanda-Jihitsu.

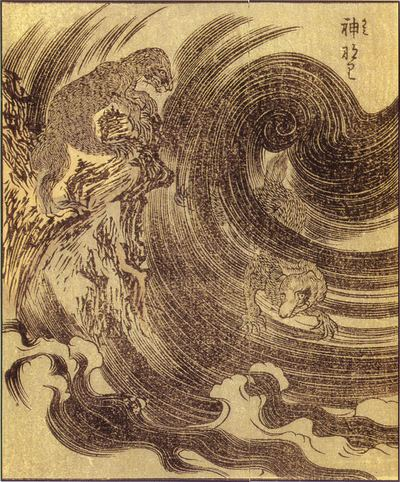
A Raijū depicted under the title "Kaminari" in Takehara Shunsen's Ehon Hyaku Monogatari.

In Japanese mythology, the raijū (雷獣, らいじゅう; lit. "thunder animal/beast") is a legendary creature and yōkai associated with lightning and thunder, as well as the god Raijin. It is said to appear with lightning strikes.

Legends of the creature exist throughout Japan, centered primarily in East Japan. Its name appears frequently in Edo period essays and modern folklore materials. One theory suggests that the Nue, a yōkai defeated by Minamoto no Yorimasa in the Heike Monogatari, was actually a raijū.

== Mythology and behavior ==
A raijū's body is composed of (or wrapped in) lightning. It may also fly about as a ball of lightning (in fact, the creature may be an attempt to explain the phenomenon of lightning, such as ball lightning). Its cry sounds like thunder.

Raijū is the companion of Raijin, the Shinto god of lightning. While the beast is generally calm and harmless, during thunderstorms it becomes agitated, and leaps about in trees, fields, and even buildings (trees that have been struck by lightning are said to have been scratched by raijū's claws).

=== Sleeping in navels ===
Another of raijū's peculiar behaviors is sleeping in human navels. This prompts the Raijin to shoot lightning arrows at raijū to wake the creature up, and thus harms the person in whose belly the demon is resting. Superstitious people therefore often sleep on their stomachs during bad weather, but other legends say that raijū will only hide in the navels of people who sleep outdoors.

=== Corn and habits ===
According to the essay Kasshi Yawa by Matsuura Seizan, when a raijū fell with a large ball of fire, a person nearby tried to capture it but had their cheek clawed and was bedridden due to the creature's "poisonous miasma." The same book contains a story about a person in Akita, Dewa Province, who caught a raijū that came down with thunder, boiled it, and ate it.

Also in Kasshi Yawa, the Edo period painter Tani Bunchō stated that humans who are near a lightning strike often lose their minds, but eating maize can cure them. A servant of a samurai family was rendered an invalid after being near a lightning strike, but returned to his senses after Bunchō fed him powdered maize. Furthermore, Bunchō heard from a man who had kept a raijū for two or three years that the creature loves to eat sweetcorn.

=== Hunting and rituals ===
The Edo period ghost story collection Ehon Hyaku Monogatari describes the creature under the title "Kaminari" (Thunder). It states that a beast called raijū lives in the mountains near Tsukuba in Shimotsuke Province (Note: Tsukuba is actually in Hitachi Province; this is considered an error in the text). While usually docile like a cat, it runs into the sky with ferocious force when evening storm clouds gather. When this beast damages crops, people hunt it down; the villagers call this "Kaminari-gari" (Thunder Hunting). People have also seen this beast near Mt. Futarasan in Nikkō, and the Edo scholar Arai Hakuseki also wrote about this in detail in his essays.

In the Kantō region, when lightning struck a rice paddy, people would immediately erect green bamboo and string a shimenawa (sacred rope) around the area. It was believed that as long as the bamboo was there, the raijū could ascend back to the heavens.

The Sengoku period warlord Tachibana Dōsetsu was struck by lightning and became half-paralyzed. However, because he continued to fight while riding in a palanquin and showed demon-like strength, a legend was born that he "became paralyzed when he slashed a raijū" (or the lightning god).

== Origins and cultural significance ==
Since modernization progressed in the Meiji era, the fame of the raijū has declined compared to yōkai and legendary creatures like the kappa or mermaid. However, during the Edo period, the raijū was extremely well known. Because people at the time lacked aviation technology, the sky was a completely unknown world. They could only imagine what existed above the clouds. Therefore, it is said that the legend of the raijū was born from the belief that unknown organisms lived in the sky and fell to earth during natural disasters like lightning strikes.

Raijū are given negative connotations as many things were happening in the sky beyond the reach of humans during the Edo period. While the depths of oceans were also inaccessible to human reason, oceans were helping humans with fishes (food) and sustained life forms. In this sense, phenomena of the sky were transcendental and given negative connotations to the phenomena and the creature.

It is believed that the myth of raijū originated from the Chinese materia medica text Bencao Gangmu. Additionally, the Shan Hai Jing, considered China's oldest geography text, describes a yōkai called the Kui (Japanese: Ki) whose bark sounds like crashing thunder; some theories suggest this Kui is the origin of the Japanese raijū legend. There are also folk customs where belief in indigenous Dōsojin and Yama-no-Kami (Mountain Gods) merged with the Kui god, such as seen in the Kuishin statues transmitted at the Yamanashioka Shrine in Fuefuki, Yamanashi Prefecture.

== Appearance and variations ==
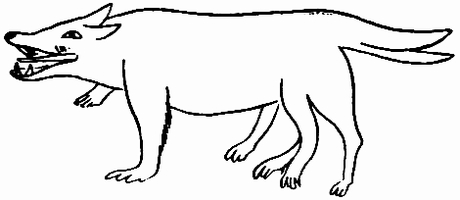
A Raijū depicted in the Gendō Hōgen.

While broadly described as a white-blue wolf or dog, the appearance of the raijū varies significantly across documents and folklore. It is commonly conceived of taking forms such as a tanuki, rabbit, porcupine, bear, squirrel, rat, mouse, deer, boar, leopard, fox, weasel, black or white panther, serow, ferret, marten, marine mammal (such as whale, dolphin or seal), tiger, and cat.

Summarizing its physical characteristics simply, it is often said to be a mammal resembling a puppy or tanuki, about 2 shaku (approx. 60 cm) in length, with a tail of 7 to 8 sun (approx. 21 to 24 cm) and sharp claws. However, detailed forms and features differ by source:

- Gendō Hōgen (by Takizawa Bakin): Depicted as having a shape like a wolf, with two front legs and four back legs, and a tail split into two (see image).
- Sunkoku Zasshi (Tenpō era geography of Suruga Province): Describes a raijū that lived on Mt. Takakusa in Hanazawa Village, Mashizu District (modern Fujieda, Shizuoka Prefecture). It was over 2 shaku (approx. 60 cm) long, resembling a weasel but also cat-like. It had reddish-black fur growing wildly, with thin black hair mixed with chestnut-colored hair. It had black patches, a long body, round eyes, and small ears resembling a rat. The feet had four toes on the front and one on the back, with webbing and sharp, inwardly curved claws. The tail was quite long. It was said to fly on clouds during severe thunderstorms, tearing trees and harming people if it accidentally crashed with great force.
- Wakun no Shiori (Edo period dictionary): Describes a raijū in Shinano Province (modern Nagano Prefecture) as a beast like a grey puppy with a long head, a tail thicker than a fox, and claws sharp like an eagle.
- Shinano Kishōroku (Tenpō era book): States that raijū live on Mt. Tateshina (Nagano), also called "Thunder Peak". This raijū looks like a puppy with fur resembling a badger and five eagle-like sharp claws. It is also called "Thousand-year Mole" because it digs holes and enters the earth in winter.
- Hokuetsu Sadan (Edo period essay): Describes a raijū in Karasuyama, Shimotsuke Province (modern Nasukarasuyama, Tochigi) as looking like a rat larger than a weasel, with very sharp claws on four legs. In summer, it pokes its head out of natural holes in the mountains to watch the sky, and immediately jumps onto a cloud if it finds one it can ride. Thunder is said to always sound when this happens.
- Echigo Nayose (Encyclopedia of Echigo Province/Niigata Prefecture): Records that in the An'ei era, a beast fell with lightning into a samurai home in Matsushiro. It was cat-like in shape and size, with glossy grey fur that shone gold in the sunlight. The belly hair grew in reverse, and the tips of the hair were split in two. It appeared to sleep with its head down on good weather days and became energetic during wind and rain. It was captured because it injured its leg falling from the sky, and was released after healing.
- Kanden Kōhitsu (Edo period essay): States the raijū is a type of tanuki.
- Koshiden: States a raijū in Akita was the size of a tanuki with blacker, longer fur.
- Oyama, Sagami Province: A drawing dated October 25, 1765 (Meiwa 2) of a raijū from Mt. Oyama (modern Kanagawa Prefecture) depicts it with a tanuki-like appearance.
- Ruiju Meibutsukō (Encyclopedia by Yamaoka Matsuake): Mentions a man named Izumiya Kichigoro in Samegahashi, Edo, who kept a raijū in an iron cage. It resembled a mole or badger overall, with a snout like a wild boar, a belly like a weasel, and ate snakes, mole crickets, frogs, and spiders.
- Aizu, Mutsu Province: A drawing remains of a raijū that fell into an old well in Aizu on July 21, 1801 (Kyōwa 1). It is depicted with sharp fangs and four webbed legs, noted to be 1 shaku 5-6 sun (approx. 46 cm) long.
- Chikubu Island: A drawing exists of a raijū said to have fallen near Chikubu Island in Lake Biwa in 1802 (Kyōwa 2). It similarly had sharp fangs and four webbed legs, measuring 2 shaku 5 sun (approx. 75 cm).
- Akō, Harima Province: A raijū that fell in the castle town of Akō (modern Hyōgo Prefecture) in June 1806 (Bunka 3) was said to be 1 shaku 3 sun (approx. 40 cm). The drawing shows fangs and webbed feet but depicts only the upper body; it is unknown if the lower body was omitted or if the creature only possessed an upper body.

Stories of raijū continued into the Meiji era. The *Hokuriku Times* (predecessor to the Kitanippon Shimbun) reported in 1909 (Meiji 42) that a raijū was captured in Minotani Village, Higashitonami District, Toyama (modern Nanto, Toyama). It resembled a cat with mouse-colored fur. When it spread its front legs, "bat-like" flying membranes spread out from its armpits, allowing it to fly over 50 ken. It had a large tail that curled back over its face and sharp claws on all legs for climbing trees. It reportedly ate eggs.

In 1927 (Shōwa 2), a strange animal was sighted during a lightning strike on Mt. Oyama in Isehara, Kanagawa. It resembled a raccoon but the species could not be identified. Because it showed strange behavior every time thunder rang out, it was whispered to be a raijū.

=== West Japan variations ===
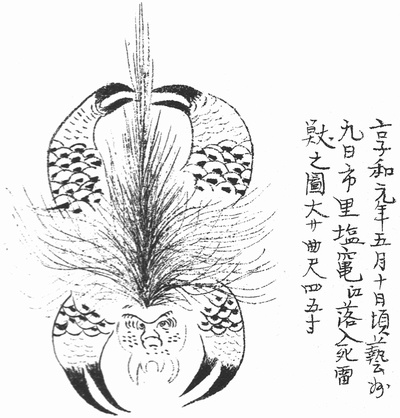
A Raijū of Geishū depicted in the Kikaishū.

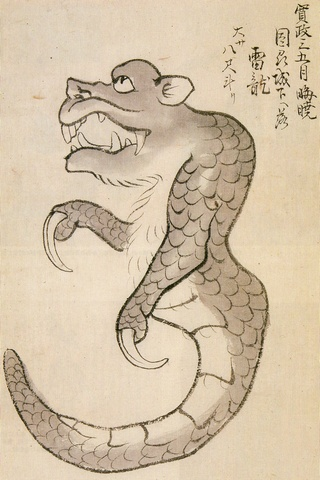
The Thunder Dragon of Inshū.

While raijū in Eastern Japan are described and depicted as mammals, stories from Western Japan describe completely different creatures. In particular, strange raijū legends were transmitted in Geishū (western Hiroshima Prefecture).

A drawing of a raijū said to have fallen in Itsukaichi Village, Geishū (modern Saeki-ku, Hiroshima) in 1801 resembles a crab or spider. Its limbs were covered in scales with large pincer-like tips. It was said to be 3 shaku 7 sun 5 bu (approx. 95 cm) long and weighed over 7 kan 900 monme (approx. 30 kg). The Kikaishū from the Kōka era also records the corpse of a similar raijū that fell in Shiogama, Kokonokaichi-no-sato, Geishū on May 10, 1801 (see image). Despite slight differences like "Itsukaichi" vs "Kokonokaichi", these are considered the same event. Furthermore, there is a drawing of a raijū dated May 13, 1801, also having pincer-tipped scaled limbs, accompanied by a description of features indistinguishable from the drawing alone: "Face like a crab, forehead has whorled hair, has four legs, like bird wings, scales grow, has hooked claws like iron."

In Inshū (modern Tottori Prefecture), a drawing remains of a beast said to have fallen in the castle town at dawn in May 1791 (Kansei 3). It measured 8 shaku (approx. 2.4 meters) long, with sharp fangs and claws. Because its body shape resembled a seahorse, it was named "Rairyū" (Thunder Dragon) instead of raijū (see image).

From cases like these, some view "Raijū" as a general term for phantom beasts that fall during lightning storms, with no fixed appearance.

== Scientific theories and true identity ==
Dead animals were found from under trees after a stormy night in Japan. Attempts were made to debunk this myth. It was claimed that dead raijū are essentially real dead animals startled or knocked off from the tree during tempestuous weather of Japan.

One theory suggests that the true identity of the raijū is the masked palm civet (Paguma larvata). Characteristics recorded in various classical texts—such as size, appearance, sharp claws, tree climbing, and scratching trees—align with the masked palm civet. Descriptions of raijū shown in sideshows in Edo also match this animal. It is inferred that because masked palm civets were rare in the Edo period and did not yet have a standardized Japanese name (like "hakubishin"), they were regarded as raijū. Experts have pointed out that drawings of raijū in Edo period books depict masked palm civets.

While masked palm civets are native to southern, eastern, and southeastern Asia, some scholars believe they were brought to Japan by soldiers during World War II as pets. However, the resemblance of raijū in Edo period paintings to the civet suggests they have been present in Japan much longer.

Another theory posits the Japanese marten as the true identity due to its size (close to a dog or cat), but since martens live in forests rather than the developed downtown areas of Edo, this is considered less likely. Other theories suggest the legend was imagined from animals like flying squirrels (momonga) falling from trees in shock from thunder, or misidentifications of weasels, giant flying squirrels (musasabi), badgers, otters, or squirrels.

In Shinano Province during the Edo period, raijū were called "Thousand-year Weasels" and were displayed at Ryōgoku. These have been pointed out to be fakes crafted from weasels or badgers. A raijū sideshow also existed in Otowa, Hoi District, Aichi (modern Toyokawa, Aichi), which is similarly pointed out to be a badger.

== Relics and historic sites ==
At the treasure hall of Saishō-ji Temple in Santō District, Niigata Prefecture, a "Raijū Mummy" is preserved as a temple treasure and is open to the public. Its origin and legend are unknown, but it has a cat-like appearance, is about 35 cm long, and is posed in a threatening stance with bared fangs. Yōkai researcher Katsumi Tada viewed this mummy and stated it was "just a cat." While there are many mummies in Japan attributed to mermaids or oni, raijū mummies are rare. In Shizuoka Prefecture, a mummy wrapped in washi paper written with "Raijū" in ink was found in the storehouse of an old family; its origin is also unknown.

Yūzan-ji Temple in Hanamaki, Iwate also has a beast mummy with a tag reading "Raijin" (Thunder God), which is regarded as a raijū. At a glance it resembles a cat, but its limbs are abnormally long compared to a cat, and its head lacks eye sockets, suggesting it is clearly distinct from ordinary biology.

Fuji Shrine (written with characters for "Wisteria") in Imayo-cho, Higashiōmi, Shiga, is a rare shrine that worships a raijū. Legend states that the village once suffered from frequent lightning strikes. A passing Yamabushi declared that a raijū living in the village was the cause. He had the locals build a large net and set it in the forest on the village outskirts. When black clouds formed and thunder began, a red-black beast appeared on the net. The yamabushi immediately caught it—it was a dog-like beast with a beak and sharp claws—and beat it to death with an iron staff. He declared his duty done and left. The lightning ceased, and a shrine was built in the forest where the beast was caught. This shrine was called "Fūjikome" (Sealing) Shrine to signify sealing the raijū, and the characters were later changed to "Fuji".

== See also ==
- Dogs in religion
- Inugami
- The Thunder in Cardcaptor Sakura
- Wolves in folklore, religion and mythology
- Yama-inu (also see the Japanese wolf).
- Kyogoku Natsuhiko: Author of Kaminari (included in Kōsetsu Hyaku Monogatari)
