= Shvana =

Sanskrit term for dog

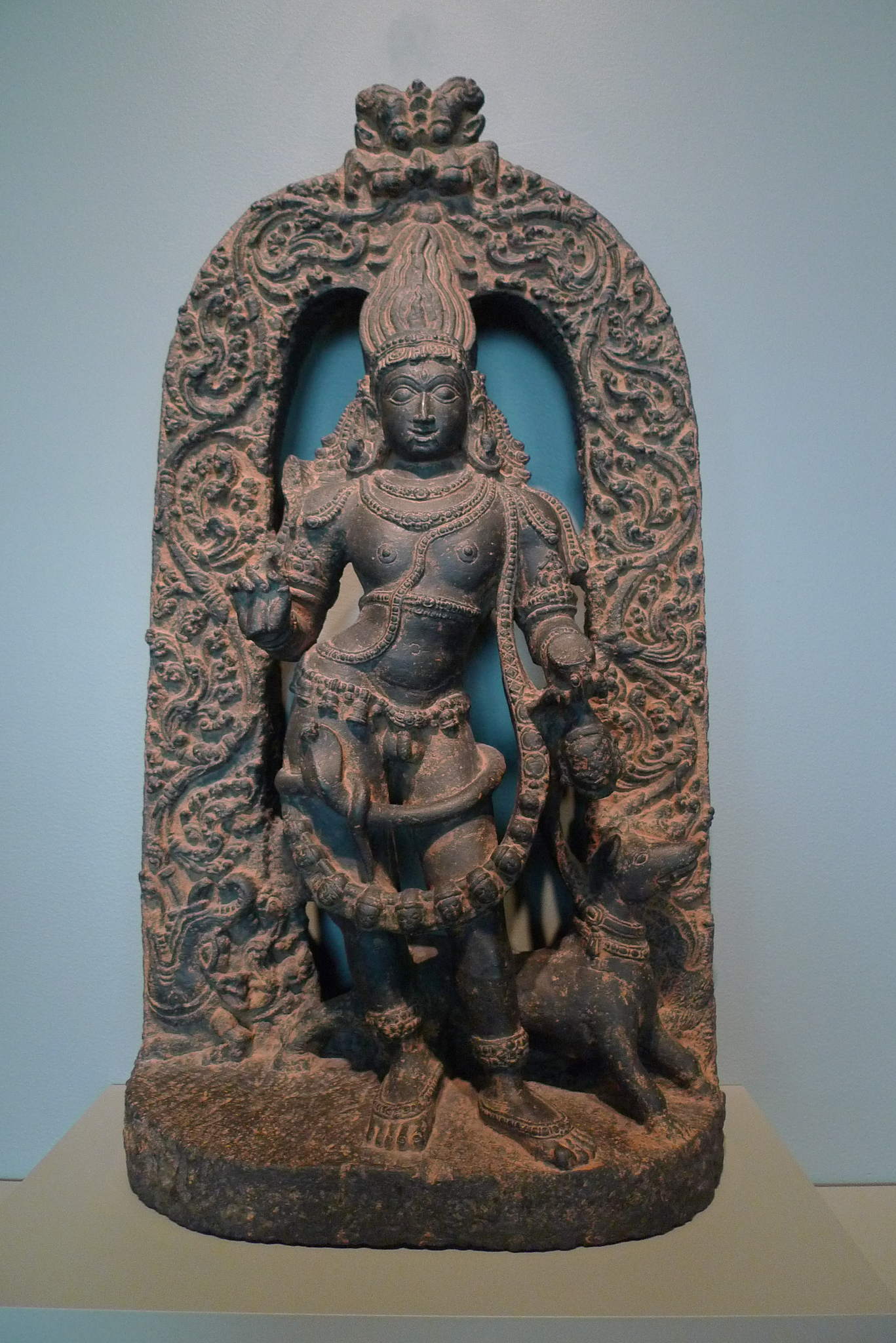
Statue of Bhairava depicting his vahana, a shvana (dog)

Shvana (Sanskrit: श्वान, romanized: Śvāna), a Sanskrit word meaning a dog, finds repeated references in Vedic and later Hindu mythology, and such references include the following:

- The female dog of Indra, a Vedic god, is named Sarama, and it is mentioned in the Rigveda. Its offspring became the watchdogs of Yama, Sharvara and Shyama.
- Yudhishthira, one of the Pandavas, insisted that he be allowed to enter Svarga (heaven) with the dog that had followed him from their advent to Svarga. The dog transformed itself into its true identity of Dharma.
- Deities like Rudra, Nirriti, and Virabhadra are associated with dogs.
- Shiva, in his aspect as Bhairava, has a dog as a vahana (vehicle) (mentioned in the Mahabharata).
- Khandoba, a deity, is associated with a dog on which he rides.
- Dattatreya is associated with four dogs, considered to symbolise the four Vedas.
