= List of Inukami! episodes =

This is a list of episodes of the 2006 Japanese animated television series Inukami! (いぬかみっ!). The episodes were directed by Keizō Kusakawa, and animated by the Japanese animation studio Seven Arcs. The series was based on the light novel version of the same name, and followed the story of a dog goddess named Yōko and her master Keita Kawahira as they fight against various troublesome spirits.

The televised series aired on the TV Tokyo Japanese television network between 6 April 2006 and 28 September 2006 comprising twenty-six episodes. Four pieces of theme music were used in the anime, one opening theme, and three ending themes. The opening theme was "Hikari" (ヒカリ; lit. 'Light') by Yui Horie was and used for the entire series except for the final episode which did not have an opening theme. The main ending theme, used throughout the majority of the episodes except for episodes six, twelve, eighteen, and twenty-six was "Yūjō Monogatari" (友情物語; lit. 'Friendship Story') by Aice^{5}. The ending theme used in episode twelve was "Kei no Uta" (ケイのうた; lit. 'Kei's Song') by Nana Mizuki, and the ending theme used in episode eighteen was "Yūjō Monogatari: Danshi (?) Version" (友情物語·男子(?)バージョン; lit. "Friendship Song: Male (?) Version) by Super Zō-sans & Rice^{5}. The episodes were released on nine DVD compilations released between 9 August 2006 and 4 April 2007 in limited edition versions, and between 4 October 2006 and 6 June 2007 in regular versions; the first volume contained two episodes, while each of the subsequent volumes contained three episodes.

== Episode list ==
No.	Title	Original release date
1	"Don't Mind Being Naked!"; Transliteration: "Hadakade Donmai!" (Japanese: はだかでドンマイっ!)	April 6, 2006
Yōko and Keita must fight an evil, perverted spirit who likes to run around naked.
2	"Machos are Lickity Licky!"; Transliteration: "Maccho ga Peropero!" (Japanese: マッチョがぺろぺろっ!)	April 13, 2006
A group of macho men are possessed by the spirits of puppies and cause problems for a local town. Note:this episode pays homage to the Movie Nausicca of the valley of the wind.
3	"Exterminating in Swimsuits!"; Transliteration: "Mizugi de Taiji!" (Japanese: 水着でたいじっ!)	April 20, 2006
The rest of the Inukami are introduced. In this episode, they are at a pool when a spirit attacks.
4	"Unwillingly Wearing An Apron!"; Transliteration: "Yarasu no Kappōgi!" (Japanese: やらずのかっぽう着っ!)	April 27, 2006
Yōko has to compete with another Inukami for Keita's wandering attention.
5	"Keita and Yōko!"; Transliteration: "Keita to Yōko!" (Japanese: 啓太とようこっ!)	May 4, 2006
How Keita and Yōko first met.
6	"Perfect Tomohane!"; Transliteration: "Pittari Tomohane!" (Japanese: ぴったりともはねっ!)	May 11, 2006
Tomohane is stuck to Keita.
7	"Mixed Bathing is Crunchy!"; Transliteration: "Konyoku de Sakusaku!" (Japanese: 混浴でサクサクっ!)	May 18, 2006
Yōko and Keita head to a hot spring to stop a pair of malicious, greedy spirits.
8	"Rubbing Tails!"; Transliteration: "Kosutte Shippo!" (Japanese: こすってしっぽっ!)	May 25, 2006
An otaku and a cosplay doll cause havoc in Keita's town.
9	"Lust & Sexual Harassment!"; Transliteration: "Bonnō to Sekuhata!" (Japanese: 煩悩とせくはたっ!)	June 1, 2006
Keita is requested by Kaoru to care for his Inukami. The girls, however, are not too happy about it.
10	"Cherry Blossom Memories!"; Transliteration: "Sakura no Omoide!" (Japanese: 桜の思い出っ!)	June 8, 2006
How Hake and Keita's grandmother met.
11	"Beg to be Exhausted!"; Transliteration: "Guttari ni Onegai!" (Japanese: ぐったりにおねがいっ!)	June 15, 2006
Keita is exhausted, and the rest of Inukami team all believe it is their fault. Keita's exhaustion is most troublesome because he is involved in an important tournament.
12	"The Dying Me's Song!"; Transliteration: "Shinitai Watashi no Uta!" (Japanese: 死にたい私の歌っ!)	June 22, 2006
Keita and Yōko are asked to deal with a malicious shinigami, which has been steadily killing off a whole family.
13	"I Am Your Song!"; Transliteration: "Ore ni wa Omae no Uta!" (Japanese: 俺にはお前の歌っ!)	June 29, 2006
Keita and Yōko continue their fight against the shinigami Sea of Violence.
14	"Kappa and Otosan!"; Transliteration: "Kappa to Otosan" (Japanese: カッパとオトサンっ!)	July 6, 2006
Yōko reveals her true nature and has to deal with her father, Dai Yōko.
15	"Returning a Favor to an Aroused Keita!"; Transliteration: "Uhauha Keita ni Ongaeshi!" (Japanese: ウハウハ啓太に恩返しっ!)	July 13, 2006
A tanuki wants to repay Keita for saving its life, but it does so by giving him a magic medicine that will make anyone he looks at fall in love with him. An excited Yōko grasps for the medicine thinking if she takes one Keita will fall for her but after Keita takes one, Yōko makes him look at her. The medicine works soon after and Yōko is soon acting like Keita's wife to be. When Yōko mentions having children to Keita however after thinking it over he is horrified at the thought of having puppies as kids and runs from her. Keita then searches for human girls to use the medicine on. This does not turn out well when Keita ends up attracting old ladies, macho guys, and four of Karou's Inukamis. The medicine does wear off after a while and an angry Yōko comes looking for Keita. When Yōko catches Keita, however, he takes all the medicine at once and after Yōko leaves him to his fate, ends up attracting much more than he could take. In the end Tomekichi and the tanuki drag Keita to Yōko, and Yōko playfully blasts Keita one for admitting he was wrong and that his strength and good looks were enough to impress the ladies. Tomekichi then tells the tanuki that perhaps the medicine was not needed after all between Keita and Yōko.
16	"Room, Ghost Story, and Me!"; Transliteration: "Heya to Kaidan to Watashi!" (Japanese: 部屋と怪談と私っ!)	July 20, 2006
Kaoru invites his Inukami to his summer villa including Keita and Yōko. Things start all well and playful until Igusa tells a scary story to Keita, Yōko, and the other Inukamis, the story is about a vengeful dummy coming to life that kills. Horrified, Tayune lets out a scream and is called a coward for being so scared by some of the other Inukami, in response Tayune insults Yōko, Imari, Sayoka, Furano, Igusa, and Tensō and later they fight her. Tayune storms off to prove she is no coward after the fight, and after they all lose against Tayune the six who lost team up and plot revenge against Tayune the rest of the Inukami want no part of it. The revenge plan the six come up with is to scare Tayune with a model dummy that looks like the one from the story and take a picture of her running and crying from it. When Tayune gets close however and just when they are about to take the pictures and scare her, the dummy gets possessed by a spirit and chases after Tayune. Tayune running and scared is later saved by someone who she thinks is Karou. It is actually Keita that saves Tayune in the end and tells her that although a coward rather than being a bother to him, Karou loves her no matter what and tells her to show her true self.
17	"What Are These Things!"; Transliteration: "Nanka Meteru!" (Japanese: なんか見えてるっ!)	July 27, 2006
Both Kaoru and Karina are sucked into Sekidōsai's painting, and it is up to Keita, Yōko, and Nadeshiko to save them.
18	"Oh No! A Mammoth!"; Transliteration: "Manmasu Taihen!" (Japanese: まんもすたいへんっ!)	August 3, 2006
The battle with Sekidōsai continues.
19	"That's Just What Mokkori Keita Wants!"; Transliteration: "Mokkori Keita no Omou Tsubo!" (Japanese: もっこり啓太の思うツボっ!)	August 10, 2006
After being unhappy being unranked Kaoru tells his Inukamis that Keita must choose new ranks for them. Kaoru's Inukamis thus set out to try and win Keita's affection doing anything they can to be ranked higher than the other. This is all hindered however by a magical pot that Keita tries to use to rank them if he gets what he wants. Karou's Inukami's then end up wanting to fight one another but are told by Sendan, and Nadeshiko that they should work together and abandon the order, the pot is later sent floating down the river.
20	"Emotions to White Cloth!"; Transliteration: "Shirabu ni Omoi o!" (Japanese: 白布に想いをっ!)	August 17, 2006
Furano and Tensō think Gokyōya has a crush on Keita after seeing a photo that looks like him in her hand while she was sleeping. After seeing this they go ask Keita to date her, something that Yōko dislikes to hear. It is later revealed that the photo is of Keita's father and that Gokyōya was kicked out of the Kawahira household by Keita's father's jealous wife. Keita later says sorry to Gokyōya for his father's actions as his son. Elsewhere Boss receives some panty/bra stealing advice from his teacher and both go after the Inukami's panties and bras much to their dismay and anger.
21	"Hang On, Tomohane!"; Transliteration: "Shikkari Tomohane!" (Japanese: しっかりともはねっ!)	August 24, 2006
Dai Yōko's seal is breaking and all the Kawahira's and Inukami must come together. However, no one can find Keita and Yōko, so Tomohane is sent out to look for them.
22	"Father and Son-in-Law!"; Transliteration: "Papa to Muko-dono!" (Japanese: パパとムコ殿っ!)	August 31, 2006
Dai Yōko's Seal has been broken.
23	"Wilting Elephant!"; Transliteration: "Shibamu Zōsan!" (Japanese: しぼむ象さんっ!)	September 7, 2006
Dai Yōko and Sekidōsai have a fight, resulting in Dai Yōko's defeat. After a confrontation with Kaoru, Keita is caught in a spell meant for Yōko and reverted to a baby.
24	"Kaoru and Nadeshiko!"; Transliteration: "Kaoru to Nadeshiko!" (Japanese: 薫となでしこっ!)	September 14, 2006
Kaoru's past is revealed. Kaoru and his Inukami again battle Sekidōsai, this time with the fate of the world, as well as Kaoru's life, on the line.
25	"Night of Regret!"; Transliteration: "Zetsubō no Utage!" (Japanese: 絶望の宴っ!)	September 21, 2006
Kaoru's Inukami fight Sekidōsai and an unexpected new enemy.
26	"Light!"; Transliteration: "Hikari!" (Japanese: ヒカリっ!)	September 28, 2006
The final battle commences in which Keita is returned to a normal human and the mage is defeated. Finally, Keita and Yōko admit their love for each other.

== Film ==
Title	Original release date
"Inukami! The Movie" Transliteration: "Tokumei Reiteki Sōsakan Karina Shirō!" (Japanese: いぬかみっ! THE MOVIE 特命霊的捜査官・仮名史郎っ!)	April 21, 2007
