= Kukur Tihar =

Annual festival from Nepal honouring dogs

- A Labrador Retriever adorned with marigold garland during Kukur Tihar
- Official name: Kukur Tihar
- Also called: Day of the Dogs; Festival of Dogs
- Observed by: Nepal, and regions with large Nepalese populations
- Type: Religious, cultural
- Significance: Honoring the loyalty of dogs and their role as companions and protectors
- Celebrations: Dogs are bathed, adorned with tika and marigold garland, offered traditional dishes and dog food
- Observances: People offer prayers and fast until they have fed a dog
- Date: Kartik (month); Chaturdashi (day); Krishna Paksha (phase)
- 2026 date: 8 November
- 2027 date: TBA (Note: The exact dates of Nepalese Hindu festivals are announced each year by the Government of Nepal after the official calendar is finalized. The dates are determined through annual Panchang (Hindu calendar) circulations based on the Bikram Sambat, the official calendar of Nepal. Once the circumstances are completed, the government publishes the annual calendar, which includes festivals days and public holidays.)
- Frequency: Annual
- Related to: Tihar

Explanatory note on Hindu festival dates
- The Hindu calendar is lunisolar but most festival dates are specified using the lunar portion of the calendar. A lunar day is uniquely identified by three calendar elements: māsa (lunar month), pakṣa (lunar fortnight) and tithi (lunar day). Furthermore, when specifying the masa, one of two traditions are applicable, viz. amānta / pūrṇimānta. If a festival falls in the waning phase of the moon, these two traditions identify the same lunar day as falling in two different (but successive) masa. A lunar year is shorter than a solar year by about eleven days. As a result, most Hindu festivals occur on different days in successive years on the Gregorian calendar.

Kukur Tihar (Nepali: कुकुर तिहार) is an annual Hindu festival originating from Nepal. It is celebrated on the second day of the five-day Tihar festival, it is dedicated to the worship and honoring of dogs, reflecting the bond between humans and dogs. The day is observed as a public holiday in Nepal.

The festival follows the Nepal's national Bikram Sambat calendar, and takes place during the lunar month of Kartik (typically falling between October and mid-November in the Gregorian calendar). It falls on the second day of the five-day Tihar festival.

== Etymology ==
The name Kukur Tihar comes from two Nepali words: Kukur (कुकुर), meaning "dog", and Tihar (तिहार) is the name of the five-day-long festival. The term therefore translates to "Dog Tihar," "Dog Festival" or "Festival of the Dogs."

== Origin ==
The Kukur Tihar is a Nepalese festival believed to have orignated from the ancient Hindu epic Mahabharata. After renouncing their kingdom, the five Pandava brothers and their common consort Draupadi, begin their final journey, known as the Mahaprasthanika Parva, through the Himalayas toward Mount Meru to reach Svarga (heaven). Along the way, a stray dog joins them as a loyal companion. One by one, Draupadi and four of the brothers die during the journey, leaving only the eldest brother, Yudhishthira, accompanied by the dog.

Yudhishthira and his dog greeted by Indra and Matali during their ascent to heaven.

When they reach the end of their journey, Indra, the king of the gods, arrives in a chariot to take Yudhishthira to Svarga, but informs him that the dog cannot accompany him. Yudhishthira refuses to abandon his loyal companion, choosing to forgo Svarga rather than leave the dog behind. At that moment, the dog reveals itself as Yama, the god of death and righteousness, who had taken the form of a dog to test Yudhishthira's righteousness throughout the journey. Impressed by his unwavering compassion and loyalty, Indra welcomes Yudhishthira into Svarga. In Hindu mythology, Yama is similarly associated with his four-eyed dogs, Sharvara and Shyama, who guard the pathways leading to the underworld (Yamaloka).

In Nepal, dogs are worshipped during Kukur Tihar as living symbols of loyalty and protection. This tradition is rooted in the belief that dogs serve as protective companions and spiritual guides, helping souls safely navigate the transition into the afterlife and face judgment under Yama, the god of death and righteousness.

== Celebrations ==
Kukur Tihar is part of Tihar, a five-day Hindu festival celebrated annually according to Nepal's national Bikram Sambat calendar, shortly after Dashain. It falls on the second day of the festival, following Kaag Tihar, when crows are honoured. The following days after Kukur Tihar include Gai Tihar, dedicated to cows; Goru Tihar, dedicated to oxen; and Bhai Tika, which celebrates the bond between brothers and sisters.

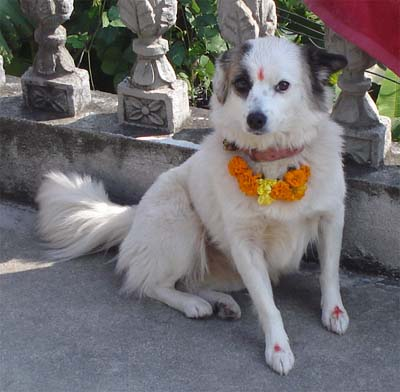
A dog adorned with a marigold garland and red tika on its forehead and top of its paws.

During Kukur Tihar, both pet dogs and stray dogs are worshipped and honored with great respect. People apply a red vermillion mark (tika) to dogs' foreheads and tops of their paws as a blessing and drape garlands of marigold or other fresh flowers around their necks. Dogs are offered traditional Nepali dishes, dog food, and protein-rich meals, such as meat, milk, and eggs.

In addition to household and street celebrations, institutions across Nepal, such as the Nepal Police and the Nepal Army, hold formal ceremonies to honor the service of police dog and military dogs. For instance, during the festival in 2018, a police dog named Kushal was named "The Best Dog of the Year" by the Nepal Police after the dog helped discover the murderer of a 10-year-old girl.

== International adoption ==
=== United Kingdom ===
In 2008, Asian Art in London celebrated Kukur Tihar by organizing a charity dog walk. In 2026, following the Greater Rushmoor Nepali Community's (GRNC) annual Remembrance ceremony in Princes Gardens, Aldershot—held to honour Gurkha veterans, service members, and fallen heroes—the Kukur Tihar festival was hosted by the Gurkha soldiers at the same vanue. As part of the event, participating dogs were presented with crocheted Remembrance poppies, and all profits and donations from GRNC and Rushmoor Borough Council event were donated to charities in Nepal and Hampshire.

=== Mexico ===
Kukur Tihar was introduced in Mexico in 2016 to raise awareness about animals respect and welfare.

=== Australia ===
On 6 November 2018, the Australian public broadcaster Special Broadcasting Service (SBS), reported that many Nepalese in Australia were also celebrating Kukur Tihar.

=== United States ===
Kukur Tihar celebrations in the United States, 2025.

The Kukur Tihar festival has been adopted in the United States. The first “Kukur Tihar USA – Day of the Dog Celebration” took place on 27 October 2024, at James Long Park in Haymarket, Virginia, United States. The event's founder, Jewan “Jack” Tiwari, announced that it would be held annually on the last Sunday of October. Following this schedule, the second annual celebration was held on 26 October 2025. The event featured the traditional blessing ceremony and received a formal commendation from the office of U.S. Congressman Suhas Subramanyam for promoting cultural exchange and compassion within the community.

== Awareness and welfare ==
In a 2016 newspaper article, the president of Animal Nepal urged Nepalese people to take care of dogs throughout the year, not just during Kukur Tihar. The president encouraged people to unchain and uncage their dogs, take them for walks, understand their feelings, and learn how to care for them properly.

A 2007 BBC photo essay on Kukur Tihar highlighted the need to improve the treatment of dogs in Nepal, noting that "for the rest of the year dogs are not generally well treated and many are left to fend for themselves and feed on scraps."

== Gallery ==
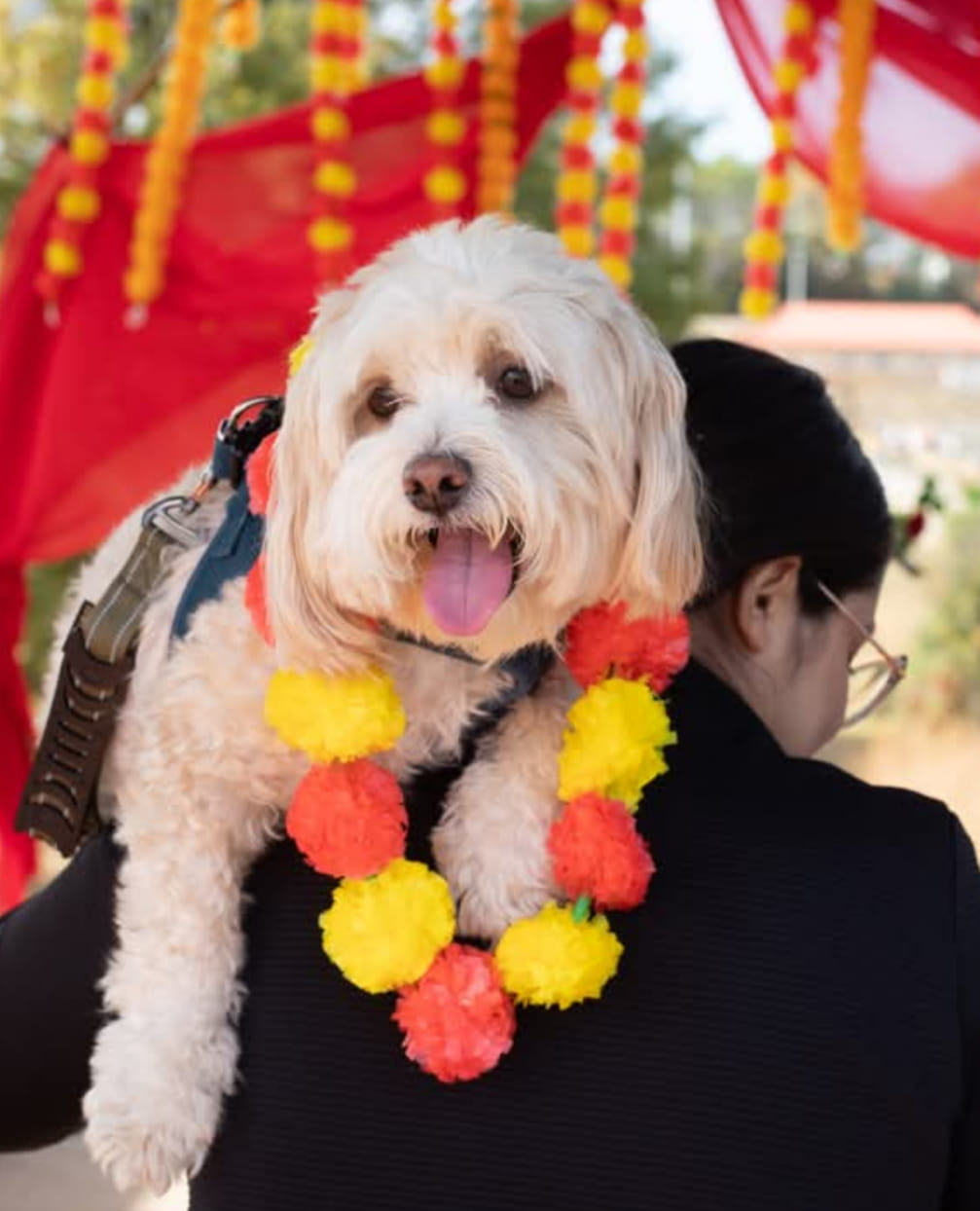
Kukur Tihar celebrations in the United States, 2025

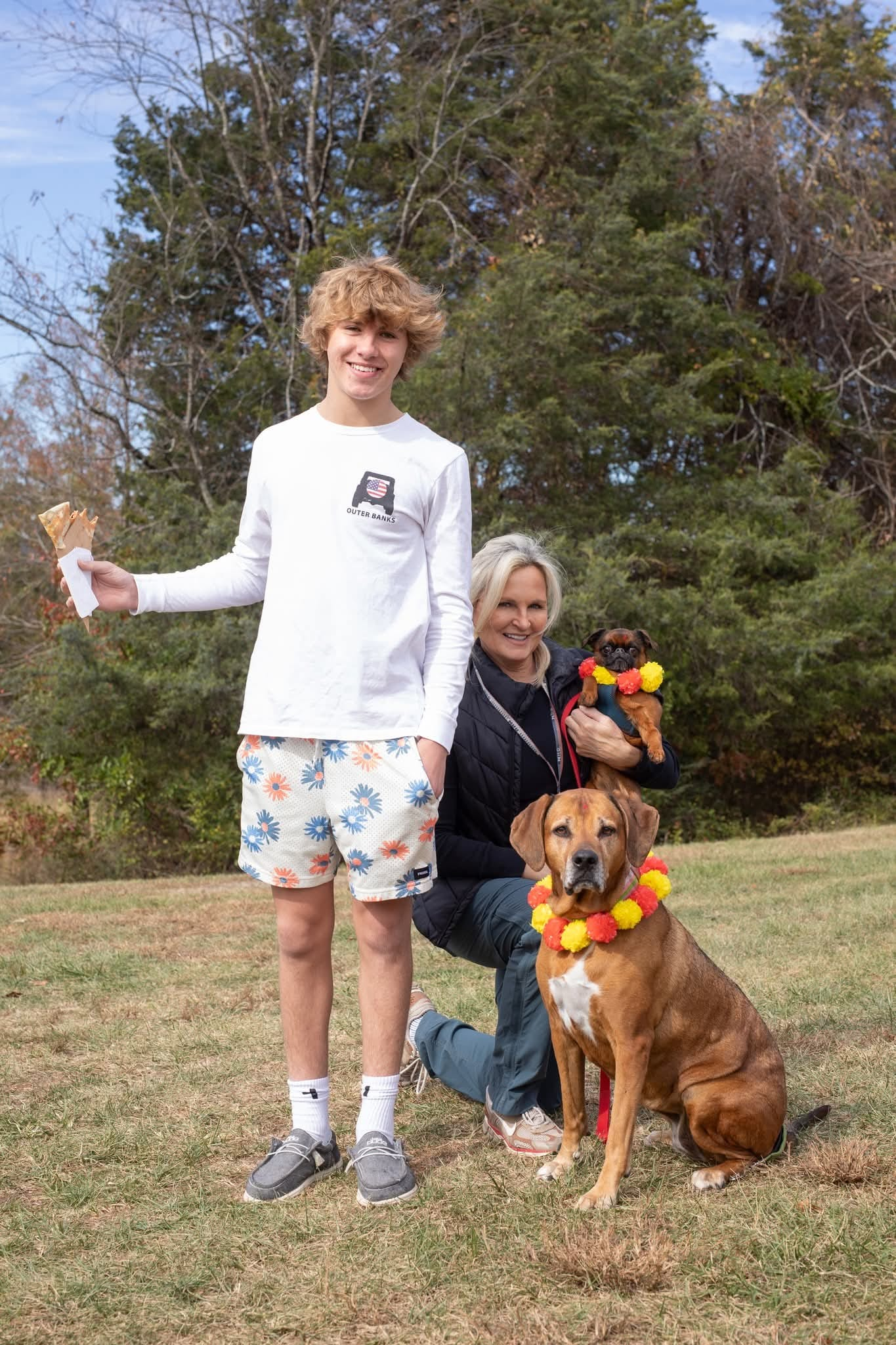
Kukur Tihar celebrations in Haymarket, Virginia, United States, 2025

A dog and cat adorned with marigold garlands during Kukur Tihar

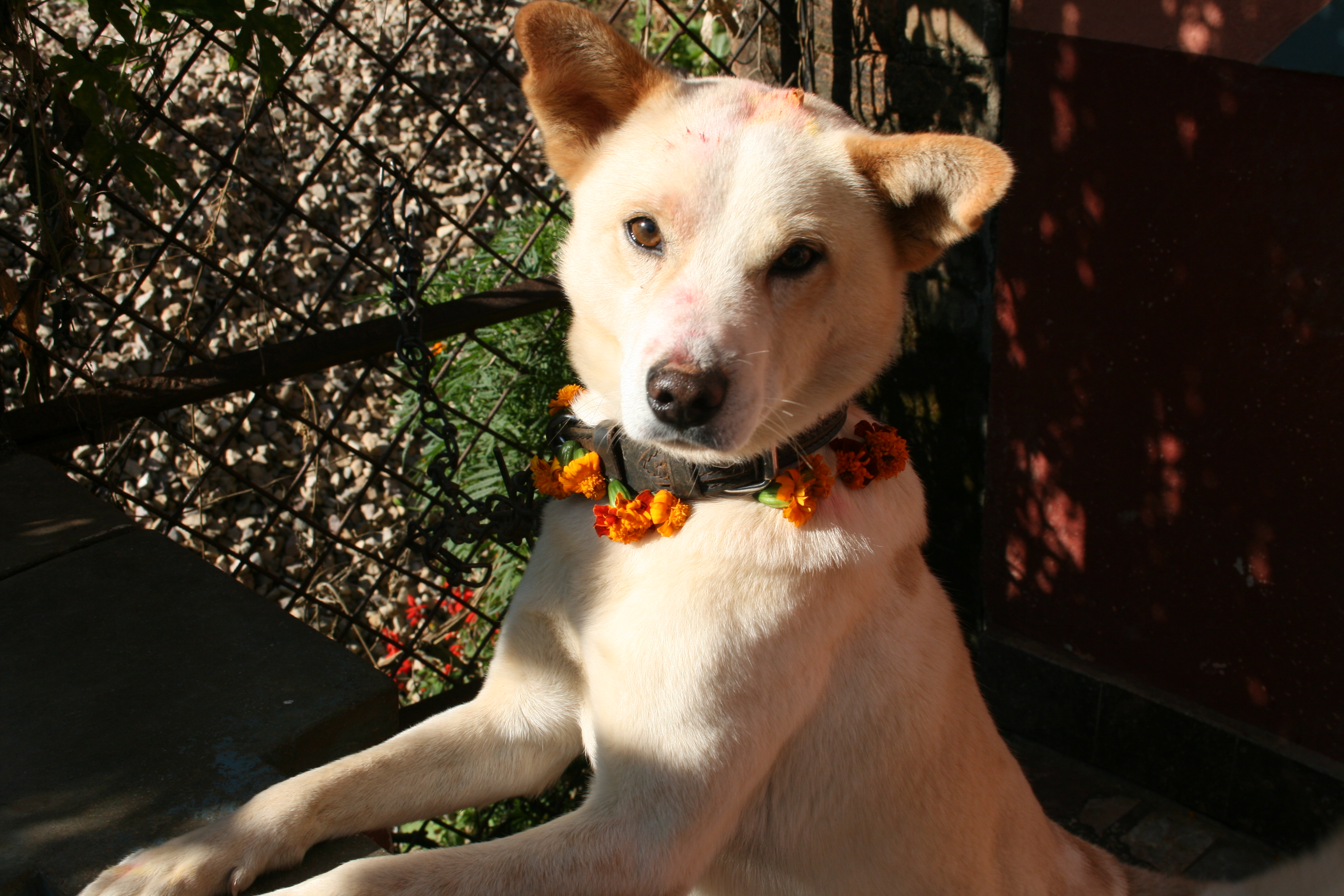
A dog adorned with a marigold garland during Kukur Tihar

== See also ==
- Kaag Tihar
- Gai Tihar
- Goru Tihar
- Bhai Tika
- Ghode Jatra
- List of festivals in Nepal
