= Gytrash =

Legendary English ghost animal

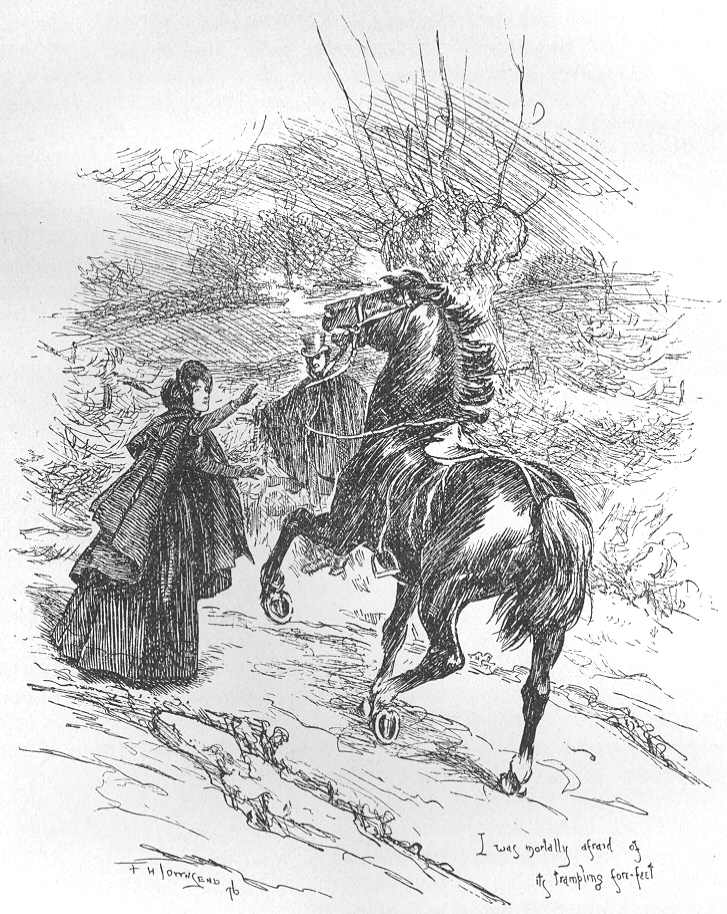
The title character in Charlotte Brontë's 1847 novel Jane Eyre initially fears either Mr Rochester's horse, Mesrour, or his black and white Newfoundland dog, Pilot, to be a Gytrash. Illustration by F. H. Townsend for the second edition of the book.

The Gytrash /ɡaɪˈtræʃ/ was a legendary shape-changer known in parts of the West Riding of Yorkshire. It was said to haunt lonely roads awaiting travelers. Appearing usually in the shape of animals (horses, mules, and dogs among others), the Gytrash haunt solitary ways and lead people astray, but they can also be benevolent, guiding lost travelers to the right road. They are usually feared. The Gytrash is a shapechanging cousin of the Lincolnshire and Northamptonshire Shagfoal, of the Lancashire Skriker, of the Padfoot, also from the West Riding and of Barguest of much of the North Riding, Cumberland, Lincolnshire, County Durham and Northumberland.

The most important gytrash references appear in the writings of the Brontës.

As this horse approached, and as I watched for it to appear through the dusk, I remembered certain of Bessie's tales, wherein figured a North-of-England spirit called a "Gytrash," which, in the form of horse, mule, or large dog, haunted solitary ways, and sometimes came upon belated travelers, as this horse was now coming upon me. It was very near, but not yet in sight; when, in addition to the tramp, tramp, I heard a rush under the hedge, and close down by the hazel stems glided a great dog, whose black and white colour made him a distinct object against the trees. It was exactly one form of Bessie's Gytrash -- a lion-like creature with long hair and a huge head [...], with strange pretercanine eyes [...]. The horse followed, -- a tall steed [...]. Nothing ever rode the Gytrash: it was always alone [...].

— Excerpt from Charlotte Brontë's Jane Eyre, chapter xii

The Gytrash's emergence as Rochester's innocuous dog Pilot has been interpreted as a subtle mockery of the mysteriousness and romanticism that surrounds his character and which clouds Jane's perception. Brontë's reference in 1847 is the earliest reference to the beast in print and forms the basis for subsequent citations.

Branwell Brontë referred to the guytrash in his unpublished writing in December 1837, predating Charlotte Brontë's reference: 'A Gytrash is a Spectre neither at all similar to the Ghosts of those who once were alive nor to fairys and silvan Creatures nor to Demons and the powers of the air[.] It does not confine its forms to the Human and indeed most seldom appears in such a form[.] A Black Dog dragging a chain a dusky calf[,] nay even a rolling stone or a self impelled cart wheel are more commonly the mortal coil of the Sullen Spectre[.] But the Darkwall Gytrash was known by the form of an Old Dwarfish and hideous Man as often seen without a head as with one and moving at dark along the naked feilds which spread round the Aged House[.] its visits were connected in all mens minds with the fortunes of the family[.] he hovered round and evil omens were always drawn on such occasions and if tradition spoke true fullfilled upon them.'

This spirit is also known as Guytrash and Guytresh according to The English Dialect Dictionary of Joseph Wright (1855–1930) where it is defined as a ghost that takes the form of an animal. These include a "great black dog" as well as "an evil cow whose appearance was formerly believed in as a sign of death."

== See also ==
- Barghest
- Black dog (folklore)
- Black Shuck
- Gwyllgi - A similar creature in Welsh folklore
- The Hound of the Baskervilles
- Grant (folklore)
