= Okuri-inu =

Supernatural beings in Japanese folklore

The Okuri-inu (送り犬) (literally, 'escorting dog') is a kind of yōkai. There are stories of the okuri-inu from the Tōhoku region to Kyushu, but depending on the area it can be a wolf not a dog, and there are numerous differences in its behaviour. It is sometimes also called simply the 'yama-inu' (山犬; wild dog, wolf) or the 'ōkami' (狼; wolf).

== Characteristics ==
The okuri-inu closely follows people who are walking along mountain paths at nighttime. If by chance the person falls over they will be immediately eaten up, but if they pretend to be having a short rest they will not be attacked. It is important not to look too tired, though. These features are common to every region, but the dog's behaviour does sometimes vary: for instance, in some places it is said that the okuri-inu will charge into you, and if you fall a pack of dogs will quickly appear and attack you.

There are also regions that have stories about what happens once you safely make it to the end of the mountain path. For example, one tells that if you reach the end of the trail, saying something like 'goodbye' or 'thank you for escorting me' will cause the okuri-inu to stop following you. Another one claims that upon returning home you should first wash your feet, give thanks for a safe journey home, then offer the okuri-inu some kind of gift. After this, it will supposedly leave.

Koyama Masao's Chiisagata-gun mindanshū (小県郡民譚集; literally, 'Collection of folk stories from Chiisagata District'), a book published in the early Shōwa period, contains accounts of okuri-inu. It describes a woman from Shioda (now Ueda) who, leaving her husband at home, went to her parents' house to give birth to her child. On her way there, she went into labour on a mountain path and gave birth there and then. Night fell, and many okuri-inu gathered around. Terrified, the woman said "If you're going to eat us then eat us!", but rather than attacking, they actually protected the mother and child from the wolves that lurked in the mountain. The husband was reunited with his wife and child, and fed the okuri-inu red rice, which is reserved for auspicious occasions. The book also says that in Koumi, yama-inu (see above) are classified either as okuri-inu or mukae-inu (迎え犬; literally, 'welcoming dog'), with okuri-inu being said to protect people like the case from Shioda, and mukae-inu attacking people.

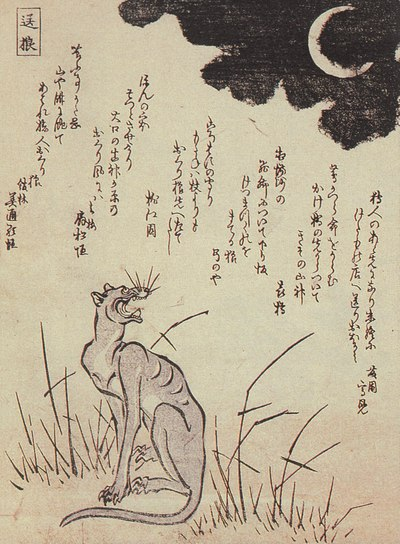
'Okuri-inu' by Ryūkansai in the Kyōka Hyaku Monogatari.

From the Kantō region to the Kinki region, along with Kōchi Prefecture, there are legends of okuri-ōkami (送り狼; literally, 'sending-off wolf'). Like the okuri-inu, they are feared as a yōkai that stalk you on mountain roads and passes that are said to eat its victims when they fall over, but can actually protect people from danger if they are treated correctly. According to the Honchō shokkan (本朝食鑑; literally, 'A record of Japanese food'), if you beg for your life without fighting back, the okuri-ōkami will save you from harm from the beasts in the mountain. The Wakan Sansai Zue's entry on the wolf states that as the okuri-ōkami will jump many times over the heads of those travelling on mountain trails at night, it will not do any harm provided you are not afraid and do not resist. However, it will eat those who become scared and fall down. Also, they will flee at the smell of a burning fuse, so people travelling in the country should carry one at all times. As well as that, it says that doing something like speaking to the okuri-ōkami or casually smoking tobacco will cause it to escort you home without attacking you. Giving it its favourite food or a single sandal as thanks will then satisfy it and it will leave.

In places like the Izu Peninsula and Toda, there are tales of the okuri-itachi (送り鼬; literally, 'sending off weasel'), said to be a friend of the okuri-inu. Also a yōkai that follow travellers at night, if you throw a sandal at it, it will supposedly catch it and go away.

Furthermore, it is said that the Japanese wolf had a trait of following humans in order to monitor them. Yōkai investigator Kenji Murakami, too, has hypothesised that the okuri-ōkami is actually the Japanese wolf, and that tales of strange goings on or protecting people are merely convenient interpretations of the Japanese wolf's nature and traits.

The Japanese expression 'okuri-ōkami', which refers to people who gain a person's good will whilst harbouring bad intentions, or a man who follows a woman, originates from these legends.

== See also ==
- List of legendary creatures from Japan – Legendary creatures and entities in traditional Japanese mythology
- Werewolf – Mythological human able to transform into a wolf
