= Dip (Catalan myth) =

Mythical hellhound

In Catalan myth, Dip (Catalan pronunciation: [ˈdip]) is an evil, black hellhound and emissary of the Devil, who sucks people's blood. Like other figures associated with demons in Catalan myth, he is lame in one leg. Dip is pictured on the escutcheon of Pratdip.

The legend is very old. Images of these vampire dogs already appear on the altarpiece of Santa Marina de Pratdip, from 1602. They also appear in another altarpiece from 1730, cut out on a gold background. Legend has it that these dogs sucked the blood of cattle, but only went out at night, and among their victims were drunken night owls who went to drink wine in the village taverns.

It was said that evil eyes could be seen in the shadows of the night. It is believed that this legend was intended to frighten the drunkards of the village and thus prevent them from engaging in more drinking.

According to tradition, the name of the village comes from these dogs, which are said to have disappeared in the nineteenth century. At the entrance to Pratdip there is a monument to this mythological being, but as it is depicted it has a very kind image.

Due to his thirst for blood, the dip served to inspire Joan Perucho who, in his novel The Natural Stories (1960), tells the story of Onofre de Dip, a vampire with the ability to transform himself into many animals. The central part of the play takes place in Pratdip at the beginning of the nineteenth century, in the middle of the Carlist war, and the dip was actually an ambassador of King James who 700 years earlier had gone to the Carpathians on a diplomatic mission and had been attacked there by a noble vampire.

== See also ==
- Cadejo
- Black Shuck
- Barghest

== Sources ==
- El gran libro de los vampiros. Angel Gordon, Morales y Torres editores. (Spanish)
