= Amaguq =

Inuit deity

According to Inuit mythology Amaguq is a trickster and wolf spirit, able to shape-shift. Amaguq is the Iñupiaq word for wolf.

== See also ==
- Amarok (wolf)
