= Amarok (legendary creature) =

Name of a gigantic wolf in Inuit mythology

An Amarok, or Amaroq, is a gigantic wolf in Inuit religion, said to stalk and devour any person foolish enough to hunt alone at night. Unlike wolves who hunt in packs, the amarok hunts alone. According to the Encyclopedia of Beasts and Monsters in Myth, Legend, and Folklore, it is also known by the name waheela.

Writing in the 19th century, Danish geologist and Greenlandic scholar Hinrich Johannes Rink reported that the Greenlandic Inuit reserve the word Amarok exclusively for this legendary wolf, whereas other Arctic peoples use it to refer to any wolf. In his book Tales and Traditions of the Eskimo, Rink recounts several folk legends that feature the Amarok.

In one tale, a persecuted and physically stunted boy seeks to increase his strength. When he calls out to the lord of strength, an Amarok appears and wrestles him to the ground with its tail. This causes a number of small bones to fall from the boy's body. The Amarok tells the boy that the bones had prevented his growth; he instructs the boy to return daily in order to develop his strength. After several days of wrestling with the amarok, the boy is strong enough to overcome three large bears, thus gaining him the esteem of his village.

In another story, a man mourning the death of a relative hears reports that an Amarok is nearby. He and a relative go in search of the Amarok. They find instead her pups, and the mourner kills them all. The mourner's relative becomes frightened. The two retreat to hide in a cave. Looking out, they see the adult Amarok returning to her pups, carrying a reindeer in her mouth. When the Amarok fails to find her offspring, she hastens to a nearby lake and drags a humanoid form from the water; at that moment, the mourner collapses. The Amarok, "from which nothing remains concealed", took the mourner's soul from his body. In some tales, a person captures or kills an amarok.

== Inuit culture ==
The Inuit culture, the word "amarok" means "wolf" or "wolf spirit." It incorporates the wolf and the wolf's spiritual essence in Inuit animism. Amarok targets human hunters or wolf packs who are either alone or careless enough to come out at night.

== Inuit language ==
In some Inuit languages such as Inuinnaqtun the spelling is amaruq (pl. amaqqut) and is the standard word for wolf.

== See also ==
- Amaguq
- Wolves in folklore, religion and mythology
