= Gwyllgi =

Mythical dog from Wales

The gwyllgi (Welsh pronunciation: [ˈɡwɪɬɡi]; compound noun of either gwyllt "wild" or gwyll "twilight" + ci "dog") is a mythical dog from Wales that appears as a frightful apparition of a mastiff or black wolf with baleful breath and blazing red eyes. It is the Welsh incarnation of the black dog figure of English folklore.

== Alternate names ==
The Gwyllgi are also called Cwn Annwfn or Cwn Annwn (meaning "dogs of the otherworld") and Cwn Cyrff ("corpse dog").

== Reported sightings ==
There have been many sighting of this beast in the north east of Wales. Specifically, the Nant y Garth pass located near Llandegla in Denbighshire. It has even been spotted as far away as Marchwiel in Wrexham and as to this day there are still many sightings of this fearsome creature.

== Popular culture ==
In Blood of the Earth, by Faith Hunter, many members of the local cult-like church have been turned into gwyllgi and capture the main character, Nell.

In the Well of Shadows series by SL Harby, gwyllgi play a prominent part in the story of the Songspear, Aristoi.

In The Beginner's Guide to Necromancy series by Hailey Edwards, a gwyllgi named Hood is one of the watchmen who guards the Faraday, a high-end condominium where Linus lives. His friend, Lethe, becomes close friends with the main character. Her brother is the Beta of the pack in Atlanta.

In the Legendborn series by Tracy Deonn, Liege Gillian Hanover tries to motivate Bree Matthews to push harder during training by pointing out that there’s no calling time out “with a gwyllgi on your heels.”

In the short story A Solitude of Space by Seanan McGuire, recurring character Alexander Healy is killed by a gwyllgi. His granddaughter Alice kills it in retaliation.

== See also ==
- Black dog (ghost)
- Black Shuck
- Cŵn Annwn
- Gytrash
