= Sharvara and Shyama =

Watchdogs of the underworld in Hindu mythology

Sharvara (Sanskrit: शर्वर, romanized: Śarvara), also rendered Shabala (Sanskrit: शबल, romanized: Śabala) and Shyama (Sanskrit: श्याम, romanized: Śyāma) are two Hindu mythological watchdogs associated with Yama.

Sharvara is identified with the constellation Canis Major, and Shyama with Canis Minor; together they guard the gates of the underworld, the domain of Yama.

== Etymology ==
The word sharvara means variegated or spotted. In older Sanskrit, शर्वर is written as कर्वर (karvara). Shyama is translated as black or dark-coloured.

== Mythology ==
Sharvara and Shyama are described to be two ferocious, four-eyed dogs that guard the entrance to the palace of Yama. The dead are required to get past these dogs in order to be rendered judgement by their master. They are referred to as Mithūdṛśā, meaning that they are not both capable of sight at the same time.

The dogs are first described in the Yamasukta section of the Rigveda. Named as the children of Sharama, departed souls are asked to venture beyond the two spotted four-eyed dogs in order to join their pitrs. They are also mentioned in a prayer to Yama, in which the dead are requested to be entrusted to their protection, and are extolled as the guardians of the road.

The Atharvaveda describes the dogs as the messengers of Yama, designated with the role of seeking out individuals who are to die.

=== Comparisons ===
Sharvara can be compared with the Greek Cerberus, the mythological dog of the Greeks with similar characteristics. However, there is no description of Cerberus having a companion, and he is usually depicted with three heads. Scholars have concluded that the three heads were a Greek addition to the underlying Indo-Aryan myth.

Shavara and Shyama can also be compared to Odin's wolves Geri and Freki in Norse mythology. Odin (the all-father) just like Yama (the progenitor of all humans) sits on a chair guarded by two dogs.

Tilak dates the Vedic antiquity using the assertion that the Milky Way (path of the dead) used to be guarded by Sharvara and a new year started upon the crossing of Milky Way by the sun. Using internal evidence he dated the timeframe of Vedic antiquity (Taittiriya Samhita) to the time when at the vernal equinox the sun rose in the asterism of Orion (Mrigashiras).
