= Barghest =

Mythical creature in English folklore

In Northern English folklore, the Barghest or Barguest is a mythical monstrous black dog with large teeth and claws; however, in other cases, the name can refer to a ghost or household elf, especially in Northumberland and Durham, such as the Cauld Lad of Hylton.

== Origin of the name ==
"Ghost" in Northern England was pronounced "guest", and the origin is thought to be of the combination burh-ghest, "town-ghost". Others explain it as cognate to German Berg-geist, "mountain ghost" or Bär-geist, "bear-ghost". Another mooted derivation is Bahr-Geist, German for the "spirit of the funeral bier".

== Domain and description ==
In Yorkshire, England, one notable case is said to frequent a remote gorge named Troller's Gill in the Yorkshire Dales. A ballad entitled "The Legend of the Troller's Gill" can be found in William Hone's Everyday Book (1830). It recounts the tale of a man who ventures forth "to the horrid gill of the limestone hill" in order to summon and confront the Barghest in an act of ritual magic. The man's lifeless body is discovered soon afterward with inhuman marks upon his breast. There is also a story of a Barghest entering the city of York occasionally where, according to legend, it preys on lone travellers in the city's narrow Snickelways. Furthermore, the building at number 1 The Shambles is named Barghest. The town of Whitby is also associated with the spectre, and yet another haunted an area of wasteland between Wreghorn and Headingley Hill near Leeds.

In Durham, during the 1870s a shapeshifting Barghest was said to live near Darlington and was said to take the form of a headless man (who would vanish in flames), a headless lady, a white cat, a rabbit, a dog, or a black dog. Another was said to live in an "uncanny-looking" dale between Darlington and Houghton near Throstlenest,.

The Barghest often allegedly serves as an omen of death. At the passing of a notable person the Barghest may appear, followed by all the other dogs of the local area in a kind of funeral procession, heralding the person's death with howling and barking. If anyone were to get in the Barghest's way it would strike out with its paw and leave a wound that never heals.

Besides taking the form of a large black dog with fiery eyes, it may also become invisible and walk about with the sound of rattling chains. It may also foretell the death of an individual by lying across the threshold of his or her house, and like the vampire the Barghest is unable to cross rivers.

== In popular culture ==
Many stories feature ghostly black dogs. Dogs specifically named as barghests appear in the following:

- The barghest appears in the children's book The Whitby Witches by Robin Jarvis.
- In Roald Dahl's The Witches, the barghest is described as always being male.
- Neil Gaiman's short story "Black Dog" features a barghest in the form of a huge black dog which has occult powers.
- In The Child Thief by Gerald Brom, barghests are distinctly doglike fairy pets of a powerful witch.
- The 1978 made-for-TV movie Devil Dog: The Hound of Hell features a barghest named Lucky.
- The Barghest O' Whitby is an EP by doom metal band My Dying Bride.
- In the video game Kingdoms of Amalur: Reckoning, the barghest is a wolf-like enemy that appears in small packs.
- In the video game Shin Megami Tensei: Devil Summoner, the Barghest appears as a recruitable demon named Hairy Jack.
- The barghest is a monster in the tabletop role-playing game Dungeons & Dragons, where it is a shapeshifting fiend that can take the shape of a goblin.
- The Witcher video game series feature barghests as hostile spectral dogs that hunt travelers in desolate roads at night.
- The "Black Hound", also known as Jelly Bean, which terrorises Trolberg in Hilda is identified as a barghest in the finale of the first season.
- In The Lord of the Rings Online, barghests are found in many places as killable enemies. They are often found with wights and other undead creatures in areas such as the Barrow Downs or Imlad Balchorth.
- A dead barghest which has been 'harvested' appears in the book Cursed by Benedict Jacka.
- In Daniel O'Malley's The Rook, the barghests were elite combat forces of the Checquy organization.
- In the mobile game Fate/Grand Order, the player can summon Fae Knight Gawain, who is in truth a Barghest who was given Gawain's name and authority by Morgan. Barghest appears as a Saber-Class and Archer-Class servant.
- The entity is a central theme in "Great Escapes", a 2004 episode of the British TV detective series Dalziel and Pascoe written by Elizabeth-Anne Wheal.
- In the Seanan McGuire's October Daye series, barghests are "nasty, semi-canine beasts with horns, fangs, scorpion stingers ... basically everything but wings" that infest the larder of a fae noblewoman.
- The card game Magic: The Gathering features a card named "Hollowborn Barghest" released in 2008 as part of the Shadowmoor set.
- In the season 3 episode "Kill Team Kill" of Love, Death & Robots features a cybernetic bear monster referred to as "Project Barghest".
- Cyberpunk 2077: Phantom Liberty, the 2023 expansion for the video game Cyberpunk 2077, prominently features the new gang "BARGHEST" as antagonists. Their logo is a large canine's head with its maw wide open.
- Bayonetta Origins: Cereza and the Lost Demon, the 2023 video game for the Nintendo Switch, prominently features the Revenant Faerie known as "Barghest" as summoned enemies under the will of a Faun, a Fairy Necromancer to attack by its command.
- Super Auto Pets, a 2021 video game, features the Barghest in the Tier 1 of the Unicorn Pack. At the start of battle, it gives the Spooked ailment onto the backmost perkless enemy.
- A Barghest appears in Marvel's Midnight Suns, a game which deals with the supernatural side of the Marvel Universe.
- A large, black, dog-like alien creature can be seen in Star Wars: The Force Awakens. Supplementary material for the film names the creature's species as a "Barghest".

== See also ==
- Black dog (ghost) – A list of phantom black dogs by locale
- Black Shuck
- Cŵn Annwn
- Fox spirit
- Grant (folklore)
- Wild Hunt
