= Black Shuck =

Legendary British ghost-dog

In English folklore, Black Shuck, Old Shuck, Old Shock or simply Shuck is the name given to a ghostly black dog which is said to roam the coastline and countryside of East Anglia, one of many such black dogs recorded in folklore across the British Isles. Accounts of Black Shuck form part of the folklore of Norfolk, Suffolk, the Cambridgeshire Fens and Essex, and descriptions of the creature's appearance and nature vary considerably; it is sometimes recorded as an omen of death, but, in other instances, is described as companionable.

According to the Oxford English Dictionary, the name Shuck derives from the Old English word scucca 'devil, fiend', perhaps from the root skuh 'to terrify'. The first mention in print of "Black Shuck" is by Reverend E. S. Taylor in an 1850 edition of the journal Notes and Queries which describes "Shuck the Dog-fiend"; "This phantom I have heard many persons in East Norfolk, and even Cambridgeshire, describe as having seen as a black shaggy dog, with fiery eyes and of immense size, and who visits churchyards at midnight."

Abraham Fleming's account of the appearance of A strange, and terrible wunder in 1577 at Bungay, Suffolk, is a famous account of the beast. Images of sinister black dogs have become part of the iconography of the area and have appeared in popular culture. Writing in 1877, Walter Rye stated that Shuck was "the most curious of our local apparitions, as they are no doubt varieties of the same animal."

== Descriptions ==
Descriptions of Black Shuck vary in both shape and size, from that of a large dog to being the size of a calf or horse. W. A. Dutt, in his 1901 Highways & Byways in East Anglia describes the creature thus:

He takes the form of a huge black dog, and prowls along dark lanes and lonesome field footpaths, where, although his howling makes the hearer's blood run cold, his footfalls make no sound. You may know him at once, should you see him, by his fiery eye; he has but one, and that, like the Cyclops', is in the middle of his head. But such an encounter might bring you the worst of luck: it is even said that to meet him is to be warned that your death will occur before the end of the year. So you will do well to shut your eyes if you hear him howling; shut them even if you are uncertain whether it is the dog fiend or the voice of the wind you hear. Should you never set eyes on our Norfolk Snarleyow you may perhaps doubt his existence, and, like other learned folks, tell us that his story is nothing but the old Scandinavian myth of the black hound of Odin, brought to us by the Vikings who long ago settled down on the Norfolk coast.

Dr Simon Sherwood suggests that the earliest surviving description of devilish black hounds is an account of an incident in the Peterborough Abbey recorded in the Peterborough Chronicle (one version of the Anglo-Saxon Chronicle) around 1127:

Let no-one be surprised at the truth of what we are about to relate, for it was common knowledge throughout the whole country that immediately after [Abbot Henry of Poitou's arrival at Peterborough Abbey] - it was the Sunday when they sing Exurge Quare - many men both saw and heard a great number of huntsmen hunting. The huntsmen were black, huge and hideous, and rode on black horses and on black he-goats and the hounds were jet black with eyes like saucers and horrible. This was seen in the very deer park of the town of Peterborough and in all the woods that stretch from that same town to Stamford, and in the night the monks heard them sounding and winding their horns. Reliable witnesses who kept watch in the night declared that there might well have been as many as twenty or thirty of them winding their horns as near they could tell. This was seen and heard from the time of his arrival all through Lent and right up to Easter."

This account also appears to describe the Europe-wide phenomenon of a Wild Hunt.

=== Bungay and Blythburgh ===
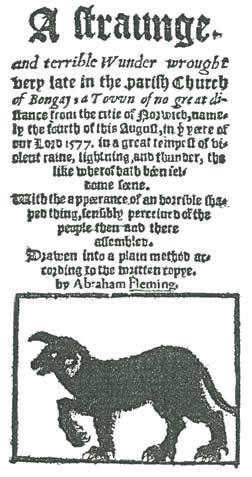
Title page of Rev. Abraham Fleming's account of the appearance of the ghostly black dog "Black Shuck" at the church of Bungay, Suffolk: "A straunge, and terrible Wunder wrought very late in the parish church of Bungay: a town of no great distance from the citie of Norwich, namely the fourth of this August, in the yeere of our Lord 1577. in a great tempest of violent raine, lightning, and thunder, the like wherof hath been seldome seene. With the appeerance of an horrible shaped thing, sensibly perceived of the people then and there assembled. Drawen into a plain method according to the written copye. by Abraham Fleming."

One of the most notable reports of Black Shuck is of his appearance at the churches of Bungay and Blythburgh in Suffolk. On 4 August 1577, at Blythburgh, Black Shuck is said to have burst in through the doors of Holy Trinity Church to a clap of thunder. He ran up the nave, past a large congregation, killing a man and boy and causing the church steeple to collapse through the roof. As the dog left, he left scorch marks on the north door which can be seen at the church to this day.

The encounter on the same day at St Mary's Church, Bungay was described in A Straunge and Terrible Wunder by Abraham Fleming in 1577:

This black dog, or the divel in such a likenesse (God hee knoweth al who worketh all,) running all along down the body of the church with great swiftnesse, and incredible haste, among the people, in a visible fourm and shape, passed between two persons, as they were kneeling uppon their knees, and occupied in prayer as it seemed, wrung the necks of them bothe at one instant clene backward, in somuch that even at a mome[n]t where they kneeled, they stra[n]gely dyed.

Fleming was a translator and editor for several printing houses in London, and therefore probably only published his account based on exaggerated oral accounts. Other local accounts attribute the event to the Devil (Fleming calls the animal "the Divel in such a likeness"). The scorch marks on the door are referred to by the locals as "the devil's fingerprints", and the event is remembered in this verse:

All down the church in midst of fire, the hellish monster flew, and, passing onward to the quire, he many people slew.

=== Littleport ===
Littleport, Cambridgeshire is home to two different legends of spectral black dogs, which have been linked to the Black Shuck folklore, but differ in significant aspects: local folklorist W.H. Barrett relates the story of a huge black dog haunting the area after being killed rescuing a local girl from a lustful friar in pre-reformation times, while fellow folklorist Enid Porter relates stories of a black dog haunting the A10 road after its owner drowned in the nearby River Great Ouse in the 1800s.

== In popular culture ==
British rock band Down I Go have a song called "Black Shuck" on their 2019 EP All Down the Church in Midst of Fire the Hellish Monster Flew, and Passing Onward to the Quire, He Many People Slew.

The Black Shuck appears in Rahel Kapsaski's 2020 stop-motion animated folk horror film Curse of the Black Shuck released by Troma.

Black Shuck is a track with 'knot-in-the-stomach insistent strings' on These Feral Lands Volume 1, a 2020 release by musician Laura Cannell, comedian Stewart Lee, and others.

In the 2005 fantasy young adult novel series, May Bird, a team of Black Shuck dogs accompany one of the series villains, the boogeyman.

The town of Bungay hosts an annual Black Shuck Festival each summer, celebrating the Black Shuck's association with the town along with other folklore and artistic endeavours.

== See also ==
- Barghest
- Black dog (folklore)
- Shug Monkey
