= Procession of the dead =

Motif present in traditional folklore

Procession of the dead is a motif present in the folkloric traditions around the world. It mostly refers to a march of ghosts, phantoms or souls, sometimes commanded by a creature related to the Otherworld, the Underworld or the Afterlife. The concept is taken to be of considerable antiquity, and is classified in Stith Thompson's Motif-Index of Folk-Literature as Motif E491, "Procession of the dead".

== Overview ==
According to Carlo Ginzburg, the procession of the dead, as described by Orderic Vitalis, comprised a march of sinners and damned people, being punished for their wrongdoings in life.

Professor Christian Abry listed several alternate names for the phenomenon in Alpine, Southern France and North Italy tradition: curs dj’ànime; La processione dei morti; Tòtòprossenziò (from German Totenprozession); kór di trapacha (trépassés); procession des revenants; cours di mort; lou cours de i anime (Occitan language); Lou cours d’li mouòrt (in Balme); il corso delle anime (in Traversella); il corteo dei morti.

Professors Fabio Armand, Marie-Agnès Cathiard and Christian Abry suggest that "the procession of the dead", as described in Christian mediaeval literature, is a "remythification" of the Wild Hunt phenomenon.

== Europe ==
=== Continental Europe ===
There are various myths of processions of the dead, most related to the Wild Hunt.

A Croatian storyteller provided a tale with the motif of the "procesija mrtvih" ("procession of the dead") in the 1970s.

In a Raeto-Romance tale, a man sees a procession of the dead and the last person is the soul of someone about to die.

=== Iberian Peninsula ===
In Galicia and Asturias, it is known as Santa Compaña.

In Portuguese tradition there exists tales about one's double that take part in this procession. There are also tales about incomplete baptized individuals that join this cursed retinue.

=== Italy ===
The Benandanti in the Friuli are said to participate in these processions. Female benandanti were seen as connected to the processions of the dead, as beneficient protectors against the malandanti.

=== Ancient Greece ===
In ancient Greece, the festival of Anthesteria was performed to honor and placate the dead, who were thought to walk freely among the streets.

== Pacific Ocean Islands ==
=== Hawai'i ===
The Nightmarchers of Hawaiian mythology are also considered to be a version of the "procession of the dead".

== Asia ==
=== Nepal ===
Professors Fabio Armand, Marie-Agnès Cathiard and Christian Abry state they have found an occurrence of the theme of the procession of the dead "in the rural areas outside the Kathmandu Valley of Central Nepal". This retinue, called panchabhāya (from pancha 'five', and bhāya 'younger brother') manifest as "five or more spirits" riding on horses and dressed in white.

== Americas ==
=== Brazil ===
The motif is also present in cultural traditions of Brazil.
