= Santa Compaña =

Mythical belief in the Iberian Peninsula

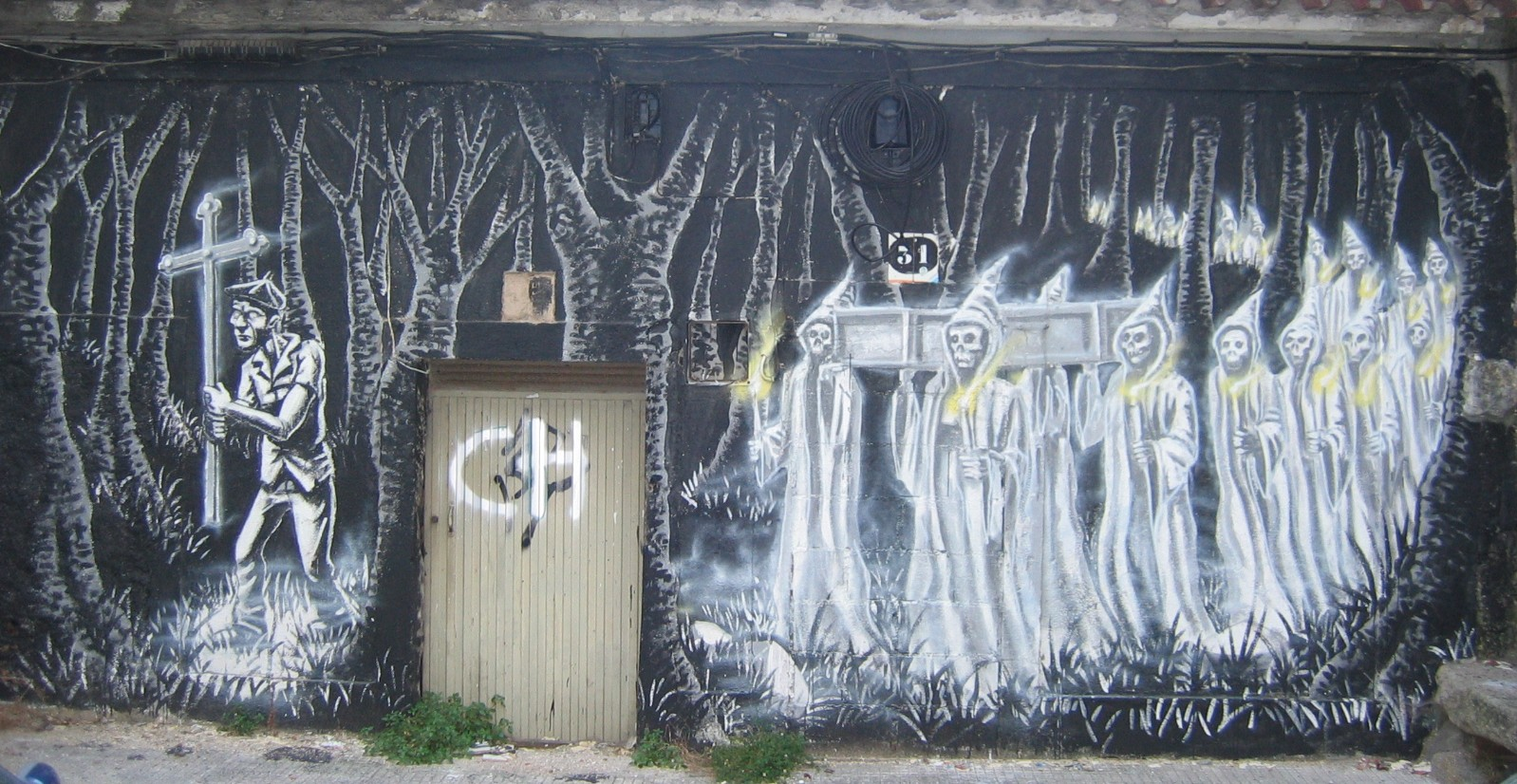
Representation of the Santa Compaña in Pontevedra

The Santa Compaña (Spanish for "Holy Company") or Güestia is a deep-rooted mythical belief in rural northwest of Iberia: Galicia, Asturias (Spain), border zones of Castile and León (El Bierzo) and Northern Portugal. It is the Iberian version of the pan-European mythical motif known as the Wild Hunt.

It is also known under the names of "Estadea", "Estantiga'" (estantigua in Spanish, from Latin hostis antiquus, meaning "ancient host"), "Rolda", "As da noite" (The Night Ones), "Pantalla", "Avisóns", "Pantaruxada"; all of which are terms that denote the presence of the dead in the world of the living. In Asturias it's prominently well-known as Güestia, which is related to the Asturian word "güeste" (host in English language).

== Description ==
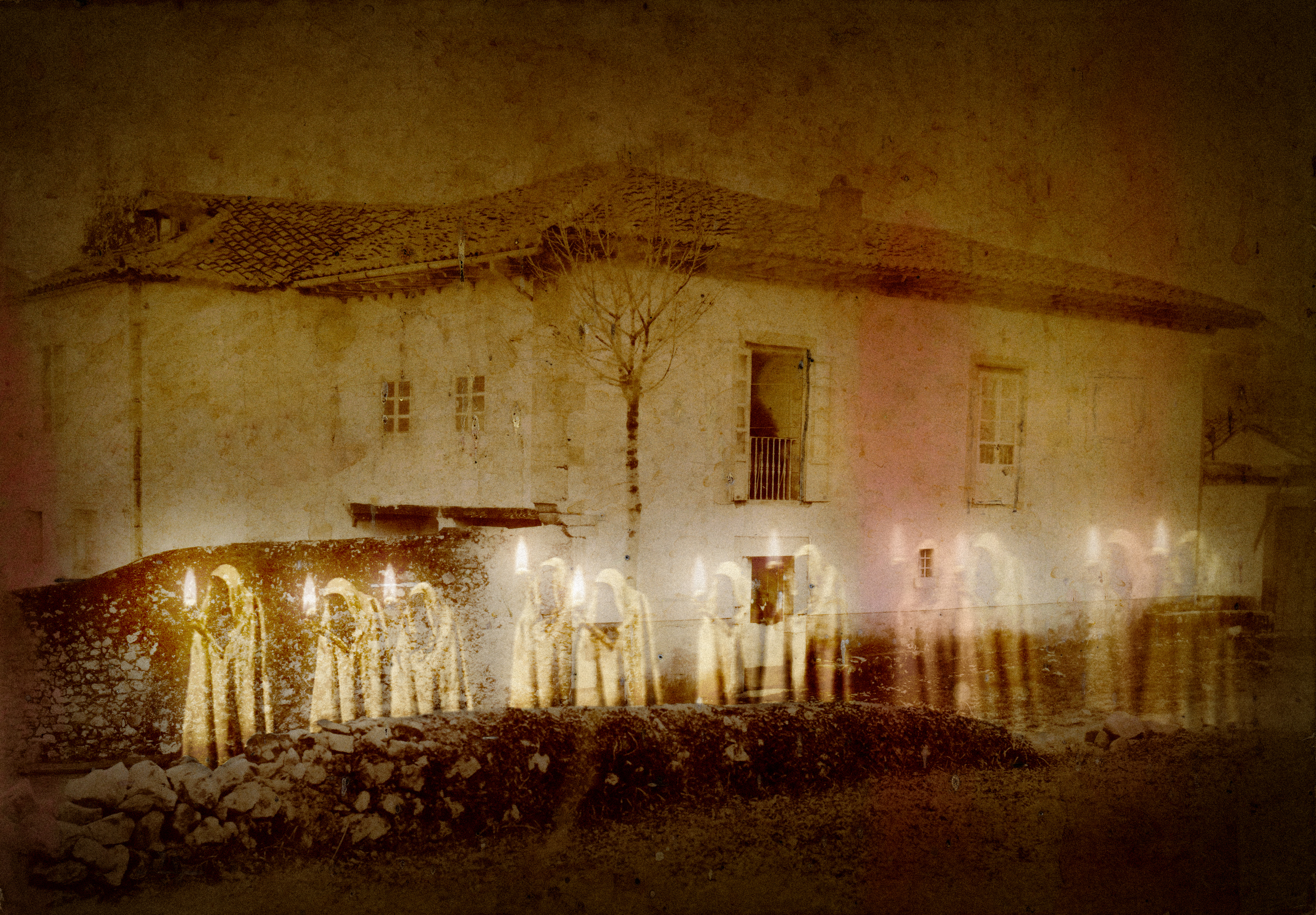
La Güestia (Photomanipulation artwork by Eduardo Valdés-Hevia)

Although many different versions of the Santa Compaña can be found, the common belief is that of a procession of the dead (or a procession of souls that are in torment) that wander through the village paths of a parish beginning at midnight wearing white, hooded cloaks.

The procession is led by a living person (usually a parishioner of a particular church) carrying a cross or a cauldron of holy water (sometimes they carry both), followed by several of the souls of the dead holding lit candles. Although these souls are not always seen, the popular legend claims that the scent of melted wax can be detected on the breeze as they pass to warn of their presence. The living leader of the procession is compelled by a supernatural force (in this case, a mysterious curse) to go out every night and walk by towns, villages and forests; but will have no recollection of it the following day. By the same token, because the living person is unaware of what he/she is doing, there is no chance that they will renounce their duty in leading the Santa Compaña, as the curse that forces them to lead the procession puts them into a trance every midnight. The procession ends before daybreak and the living leader of the procession returns to their bed with no memory of what occurred, but will awake the next morning still weary, as though they did not get adequate rest. This person can only be freed of the curse if they come across another person during the procession to carry the cross or the cauldron (or both), as the curse will be passed on to that person. It is said that if the curse leader does not pass the curse onto another person in a matter of weeks, he/she will eventually grow pale, thin and sickly and eventually die, following which the curse will be unknowingly passed on to another parishioner.

To avoid receiving the curse, the person who sees the Santa Compaña pass by must quickly draw "Solomon's Circle" on the ground using chalk (a circle with Seal of Solomon inside a six-pointed star, which can be changed into a cross) and enter it, or lie face-down until the procession passes. Another way to evade the Santa Compaña is to tie a black cat in the middle of the Santa Compaña's path and quickly run away from it, or to perform diverse warding symbols with both hands such as the horn gesture (extending the index and little fingers with the rest of the fingers folded inwards) or the fig sign (which consists of closing the fist and putting the thumb between the index and middle fingers). The person leading the procession can be a man or a woman—this depends on whether the patron saint of the parish is male or female. The Santa Compaña's purpose is to announce death and its primary mission is to visit the homes where death is due.

According to popular belief, apart from the living procession leader, the Santa Compaña can't be seen but can be felt, eliciting a shiver or shudder as it passes, accompanied with a sensation of intense danger. It is also believed that those who can see the Santa Compaña are people who, when baptised by the priest of their parish, were mistakenly anointed with holy oil for the sick instead of chrism. In other versions, it is believed that they are people with special sensibilities who are able to see hidden things. Some people are unable to see the souls in the procession but can see the light of their candles, floating in the air like ignis fatuus or will-o'-the-wisp (similar to the "spook lights" in the rural USA or "jack o'lantern" in the rural UK) as they move along their path.

== Origins ==
It may be related to Odin's Wild Hunt, or the Welsh Hounds of Annwn and the Breton Celtic westward processions of the dead to the End of the World. It is equivalent to the Irish Banshee and Breton Ankou.

== See also ==
- Ankou
- Banshee
- Hyakki Yagyō
- Madam Koi Koi
- Nightmarchers
- Wild Hunt

== Bibliography ==
- J. Cuveiro Piñol, Diccionario Gallego, Barcelona, 1876: Compaña: entre o vulgo, creída hoste ou procesión de bruxas que andan de noite alumeadas con osos de mortos, chamando ás portas para que as acompañen, aos que desexan que morran axiña…
- Elisardo Becoña Iglesias, "La Santa Compaña, El Urco y Los Muertos", A Coruña, 1980
- Paula Cristobo, La Santa Compaña. Entre el mito, la realidad y la superstición. Revista Investigación, 2002
