= Ears of Rye Under Thy Sickle =

Novel by Uladzimir Karatkievich

- Author: Uladzimir Karatkievich
- Language: Belarusian
- Genre: Historical novel
- Publication date: 1965
- Publication place: Belarus

Kalasy pad siarpom tvaim (Belarusian: Каласы пад сярпом тваім, Ears of Rye Under Thy Sickle or Ears of Grain Under Your Sickle) is a historical novel by the Belarusian writer Uladzimir Karatkievich (1930–1984). Set between 1850 and 1861, it depicts Belarusian society on the eve of the January Uprising of 1863–64. It was serialised in the journal Polymia in 1965 and published as a two-volume book in Minsk in 1968. It is widely regarded as Karatkievich's central work and one of the most significant Belarusian novels.

== Composition ==
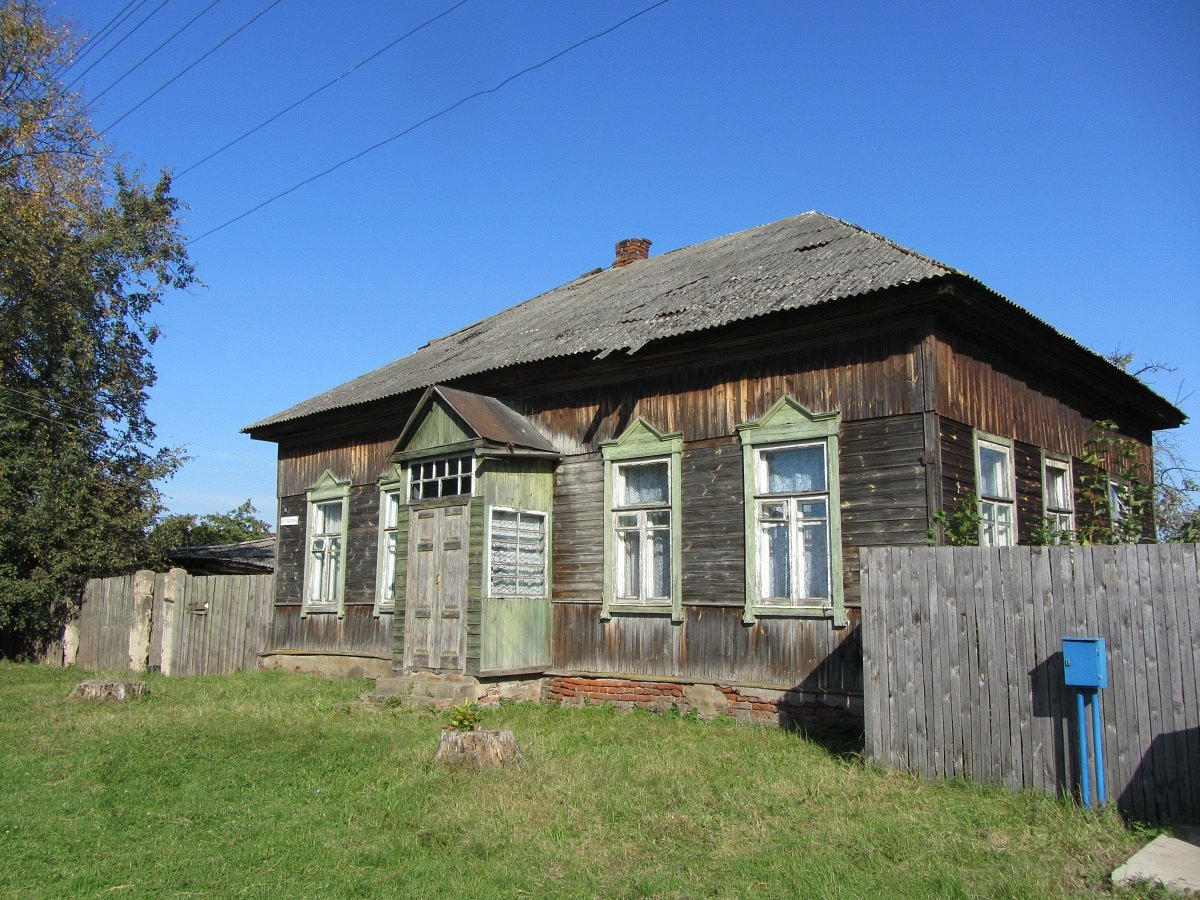
Karatkievich grandfather's house in Rahachou

After graduating from Kyiv University, Karatkievich began a dissertation on the 1863 uprising in East Slavic and Polish literature, abandoned it in favour of writing a novel on the same subject, and returned to the idea years later. One of his notebooks dates the novel's beginning to 7 August 1959, near Aziaryshcha in the Rahachoŭ district, where he saw a pear tree on the high right bank of the Dnieper. He recorded finishing the first book on 18 May 1964. His maternal great-grandfather, Tamash Hryniewicz, had commanded an insurgent detachment in the Mahilioŭ region in 1863 and was executed.

Karatkievich planned a trilogy: Uskhod (Siajva dnia), Bran' and Varannio (Halhofa), covering the eve of the uprising, the uprising itself, and its defeat. Only the first part was completed. It was split into two books for publication, "Vyjstsie krynits" (Выйсце крыніц) and "Siakiera pry dreve" (Сякера пры дрэве).

== Plot ==
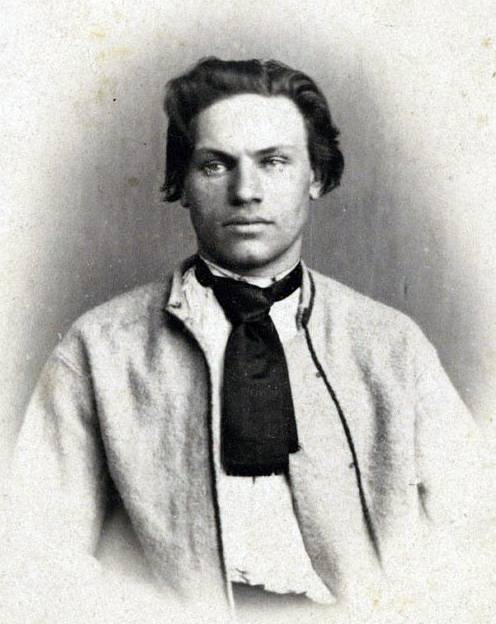
Kastuś Kalinoŭski, c. 1862/63

The action moves between the Mahilioŭ region, the town of Svislach, St Petersburg, Moscow and Warsaw, with retrospective passages reaching further back. The main hero is the young nobleman (szlachta) Ales Zahorski, raised for a time in a peasant household under the custom of dziadzkavannie (a supposed historical practice of raising noblemen's children in peasant households).

The book features historical figures including Kastuś and Viktar Kalinoŭski, Zygmunt Sierakowski, Stanisław Moniuszko, Vincent Dunin-Marcinkievič, Władysław Syrokomla and Taras Shevchenko as characters.

The hero, young Ales Zahorski, meets Kastus Kalinouski. Together, they join an illegal organisation and prepare for the uprising. The uprising was supposed to be covered in a subsequent book.

== Publication and textual history ==
The 1965 serialisation in Polymia was substantially cut and altered relative to the manuscript, with edits made by the journal's editor-in-chief, the poet Maksim Tank. Its publication was contested: Maksim Łužanin produced a 75-page negative review, and critics pressed Karatkievich to recast the peasantry rather than the gentry as the uprising's driving force and to tie it to the Russian revolutionary movement. He refused and requested a formal discussion at the Belarusian Writers' Union, held on 22 February 1967 under Ivan Mielež. The book appeared in 1968 from the state publisher "Belarus" in a print run of 10,000, with a cover by the graphic artist Arlen Kaškurevič, and was reissued repeatedly thereafter. The 1968 edition differs from the Polymia one.

An edition prepared by the editor Valiancina Andrejeva for the 25-volume collected works (2014) restored roughly a quarter of the author's text. A further revised version, marketed as uncensored, was published in Poland by Kamunikat in early 2026; it is the first Belarusian-language edition issued abroad. Andrejeva questioned the "censorship" framing, noting that Belarusian historian Adam Maldzis worked on the edits together with Karatkievich himself.

== Continuation ==
According to Maldzis, who published the author's first biography, Karatkievich wrote the second part of the trilogy, but it was stolen. Karatkievich did not know who stole it, but implied that it was the KGB, which did so to suppress publication of a nationalistic book. The idea that the book was stolen by the KGB became an urban myth.

Adam Hlobus, a friend of Karatkievich, stated that Karatkievich did not write the second part because he did not want to kill his heroes.

Three novellas about the Uprising, Zbroia (Weapons, Зброя), Siniaja-siniaja (Blue-blue, Синяя-синяя), Studzenskim tsemnym svitannem (In the dark dawn of January, Студзеньскім цёмным світаннем) are sometimes considered a continuation of the novel.

== Reception and legacy ==
The novel is credited with establishing Kastuś Kalinoŭski as a figure of Belarusian national memory.

The book was studied in the last grade of Belarusian schools until 2023, when it was removed from the curriculum and replaced by Karatkievich's Chorny zamak Alshanski; the propagandist Vadzim Hihin stated on television that the removal had been his initiative, arguing that the novel's treatment of the period diverged from the historical documents.

== Translations ==
An authorised Russian translation by Valentina Shchedrina appeared in Moscow in 1974. A Ukrainian translation was published in 1991.

The book hasn't been translated into English.
