= Compana =

Compana may refer to:

- an American barley cultivar
- Santa Compaña, a deep-rooted mythical belief in rural Galicia and Asturias, Spain
