= Eadric the Wild =

11th-century Anglo-Saxon magnate

Eadric the Wild (or Eadric Silvaticus), also known as Wild Edric, Eadric Cild (or Child) and Edric the Forester, was an Anglo-Saxon magnate of Shropshire and Herefordshire who led English resistance to the Norman Conquest, active in 1067–1070.

== Background ==
The early 12th-century historian John of Worcester writes that Eadric the Wild was a son of one Ælfric, whom he identifies as a brother of Eadric Streona, ealdorman of Mercia under King Æthelred the Unready. While five of Eadric Streona's brothers appear to attest witness-lists of King Æthelred's charters, no Ælfric makes a plausible candidate for identification with a brother of the ealdorman. It is possible that Ælfric was not a brother but a nephew of the ealdorman. If so, Eadric (the Wild) would belong to the same generation as his cousin Siward son of Æthelgar, who was himself a grandson of Eadric Streona.

Because Eadric's name is a common one in pre-Conquest England, identification with any of the landholders of this name listed in Domesday Book remains a ticklish affair. Nevertheless, it would seem that he held land extensively in Shropshire and also held roughly 12 hides in Herefordshire. He is probably the Eadric son of Ælfric who held two estates from Much Wenlock Priory (Shropshire). Eadric and his cousin Siward ranked as the wealthiest thegns in Shropshire.

== Resistance to Norman rule ==
Accounts of Eadric's act of rebellion in Herefordshire in 1067 are included in Manuscript D the Anglo-Saxon Chronicle, John of Worcester's Chronicle and Orderic Vitalis. After the Conquest of England by William II of Normandy, Eadric refused to submit and therefore came under attack from Norman forces based at Hereford Castle, under Richard fitz Scrob. He raised a rebellion and, allying himself with the Welsh prince of Gwynedd and Powys, Bleddyn ap Cynfyn, and his brother Rhiwallon ap Cynfyn, he unsuccessfully attacked the Norman Hereford Castle in 1067. They did not take the county, and retreated to Wales to plan further raiding.

During the widespread wave of English rebellions in 1069–70, he burned the town of Shrewsbury and unsuccessfully besieged Shrewsbury Castle, again helped by his Welsh allies from Gwynedd, as well as other English rebels from Cheshire.

It was probably this combination of forces which was decisively defeated by William in a battle at Stafford in late 1069. Eadric apparently submitted to King William in 1070 and later participated in William's invasion of Scotland in 1072. Another account states that he was captured by Ranulph de Mortimer "after long struggles and handed over to the king for life imprisonment, some of his lands afterwards descending to the abbey" of Wigmore.

He campaigned in Maine for King William in 1072 and according to the Mortimer genealogy held Wigmore Castle against Ranulph de Mortimer during the rebellion of 1075.

== Post-rebellion ==
According to Susan Reynolds: "Domesday Book mentions 'Edric salvage' as the former tenant of six manors in Shropshire and one in Herefordshire." He may have held others but there is a profusion of Eadrics in Domesday, rendering closer identification difficult if not impossible. Reynolds continues: "Eyton commented that 'a genealogical enthusiast would have little hesitation in assuming as a conclusion' the possibility that William le Savage, who held Eudon Savage, Neen Savage and Walton Savage of Ranulph de Mortimer in the twelfth century, could have been a descendant of Eadric". Eadric's cousin Ealdraed inherited his land at Acton Scott, which was later held by William Leyngleys ("the Englishman", died 1203), likely to have been Ealdraed's descendant. The property is still in the hands of Leyngleys' descendants, the Actons, having passed down through the generations without ever being sold. Various branches of the Weld family of England traditionally claim descent from Eadric, including the Welds of the United States and the extinct line of Weld-Blundells.

Walter Map, in his De nugis curialium, recounts a legend where Edric and a hunting companion come across a house of succubi in the woods, one of whom Edric marries and bears him a son, Alnodus or Ælfnoth. Walter cites Alnodus as a rare example of a happy and successful offspring from a human-succubus relationship.

== Eadric's byname ==
In the Anglo-Saxon Chronicle (MS D), Eadric is nicknamed Cild (literally "child"), which may signify a title of rank. He was also known as "the Wild", as witnessed by such bynames as se wild, salvage and in Latin, silvaticus. According to Susan Reynolds:

Historians have generally treated Eadric's surname as a nickname, describing his personal qualities ... A ... likely explanation is that Eadric was one of a group of people well known in their own day as 'silvatici'. Orderic Vitalis says in his description of the English risings of c.1068–9 that many of the rebels lived in tents, distaining to sleep in houses lest they should become soft, so that certain of them were called silvatici by the Normans. ... he is not the only chronicler to make it clear that the English resistance was very widespread or to describe the rebels as taking to the woods and marshes. The Abingdon chronicle says that many plots were hatched by the English and that some hid in woods and some in islands, plundering and attacking those who came in their way, while others called in the Danes, and that men of different ranks took part in these attempts ... That they should have made their bases in wild country and, like the twentieth-century maquis, have been named for it, is perfectly credible.

Reynolds further notes that:

If it is true, however, that the silvatici were for some years a widespread and well-known phenomenon, that might help to explain aspects of later outlaw stories that have puzzled historians. Few outlaws in other countries have apparently left so powerful a legend as Robin Hood. ... The most famous outlaws of the greenwood before him were probably the Old English nobility on their way down and out.

== Legacy ==
In later folklore Eadric is mentioned in connection with the Wild Hunt, and in the tale of Wild Eadric.

Eadric was portrayed by Robert O'Mahoney in the TV drama Blood Royal: William the Conqueror (1990).

In 2005, the English rose hybridists David Austin Roses introduced the rose Wild Edric.

Wild Eadric returns every year to fight Picot de Say as part of the Mummer's play during the Clun Green Man Festival.

== See also ==
- Wild Edric's Way, a long distance footpath in Shropshire
- Hereward the Wake, another rebel leader against the Norman conquest

== Sources ==
- Burke's Landed Gentry
- Douglas, D.C. (1964). William the Conqueror. London: Eyre Methuen.
- Eyton, R.W. (1854–60). Antiquities of Shropshire. Vol. 11 of 12. pp. 111, p.r8–50, iv. 194.
- Remfry, P.M. (1997). Richards Castle 1048 to 1219. SCS Publishing. pp. 1–2.
- Reynolds, Susan (1981). "Eadric silvaticus and the English resistance". Bulletin of the Institute of Historical Research. 54 (129): 102–5. doi:10.1111/j.1468-2281.1981.tb02042.x.
- Williams, Ann (1995). The English and the Norman Conquest. Woodbridge: Boydell.
- Williams, Ann (2004). "Eadric the Wild (fl. 1067–1072)" (fee required). Oxford Dictionary of National Biography. Oxford University Press. doi:10.1093/ref:odnb/8512. Accessed 25 June 2009
