= Herla =

Mythical king of the Britons

Herla or King Herla (Old English: *Her(e)la Cyning) is a legendary leader of the mythical Germanic Wild Hunt and the name from which the Old French term Herlequin may have been derived. Herla often has been identified as Woden and in the writings of the twelfth-century writer Walter Map, he is portrayed as a legendary king of the Britons who became the leader of the Wild Hunt after a visit to the Otherworld, only to return some three hundred years later, after the Anglo-Saxon settlement of Britain.

Map's tale occurs in two versions in his De nugis curialium. The first and longer account, found in section 1.12, provides far more detail; it tells of Herla's encounter with an otherworldly being, his journey to the latter's homeland, his transformation into the leader of the Hunt after his return to the human realm, and, finally, the disappearance of Herla and his band during the first year of the reign of Henry II of England (a synopsis of this longer version appears below). The second account, found in section 4.13, includes only the ending of the earlier version. Herla is not mentioned in the second account by name; instead, Map refers to the entire host as "the troop of Herlethingus" (familia Herlethingi).

== Origins and etymology ==
King Herla is a modernisation of an Old English form reconstructed as *Her(e)la Cyning, a figure that usually has been identified with Woden in his guise as leader of the Germanic Wild Hunt and thus the name is thought to be related to the French Harlequin (variant form of Harlequin, Hellequin), the leader of the Wild Hunt in Old French tradition.

== Synopsis of the Walter Map story ==
Herla, a king of the Britons, meets with an unnamed dwarven king with a great, red beard and goat's hooves, who is mounted on a goat. They make a pact: if the latter attends Herla's wedding, Herla will reciprocate precisely one year later.

On the day of Herla's marriage, the dwarf king attends with a vast host, bringing gifts and provisions. The dwarf king's followers attend to the wedding guests so efficiently that Herla's own preparations are left untouched. The otherworldly king then reminds Herla of his promise, and departs.

A year later, the dwarf king sends for Herla, who summons his companions and selects gifts to take to the dwarf king's wedding. The party enters an opening in a high cliff, passes through darkness, and then enters a realm seemingly lit by lamps.

After the wedding ceremony, which lasted for three days in the dwarf king's realm, is over, Herla prepares to depart, and he and his men mount their horses. The dwarf gives him hunting animals and other gifts; in particular, he presents Herla with a small bloodhound, which jumps up onto the mounted king’s lap. The dwarf advises Herla that no man should dismount until the dog had first left his lap.

After Herla and his band return to the human realm, they encounter an elderly shepherd, whom Herla asks for news of his queen. The old man, astonished, replies, "I can barely understand your speech, for I am a Saxon and you are a Briton." The elderly shepherd described a legend of a very ancient queen of the Britons bearing the name mentioned, the wife of King Herla, who had disappeared with a dwarf king into that very cliff and was never seen again. The shepherd also added that currently the Saxons had been in possession of the kingdom for the last two hundred years, and had driven out the native Britons.

Herla, who thought he had been away for just three days, is so amazed he barely could stay in the saddle. Some of his men jump down from their horses, only to crumble quickly into dust. Herla warns his remaining companions not to dismount until the dog alights, but the dog, Map says wryly, has not yet alighted, and Herla and his host have become eternal wanderers.

Map notes, however, that some say Herla's band plunged into the River Wye during the first year of the reign of King Henry II (the year 1154), and has never been seen since.

== Moral and reasoning ==
This folk tale is supposed to illustrate the trickery of the elder races, such as the dwarves. That, for ignorant men, their miniature kingdoms harboured dangers which could bring even a king to his knees.

It also is an example of the widespread belief that time in the elfin realms passed more slowly than it did on Earth.

The story bears strong resemblances to the Welsh tale of Preiddeu Annwn or the "Spoils of the Otherworld" and the First Branch of the Mabinogi to which it may be connected, with Herla replaced by Pwyll.
