= De nugis curialium =

Book of 12th century anecdotes by Walter Map

De nugis curialium (Medieval Latin for "Of the trifles of courtiers" or loosely "Trinkets for the Court") is the major surviving work of the 12th-century Latin author Walter Map. The book takes the form of a series of anecdotes of people and places, offering many sidelights on the history of his own time. Some are from personal knowledge, and apparently reliable; others represent popular rumours about history and current events, and are often far from the truth.

== Outline of contents ==
=== Distinctio prima ===
- A comparison of royal courts with Hell; Hell and its mythical inhabitants
- Courtiers and serfs (including a conversation with Ranulf de Glanvill)
- The legendary King Herla and the origins of the Wild Hunt
- Tale of an early king of Portugal (probably Afonso I or Sancho I) who had his wife murdered
- Anecdotes of the poet Giscard de Beaulieu and of another Cluniac monk
- The capture of Jerusalem by Saladin on 2 October 1187
- Founding of the Carthusian Order
- Founding of the Order of Grandmont by Saint Stephen of Muret
- Founding of the Knights Templar by Hugues de Payens with anecdotes of their early years
- The senex Axasessis or Old Man of the Mountain, founder of the Assassins
- Founding of the Knights Hospitaller
- Foundation of the Cistercian Order with anecdotes of Stephen Harding, Bernard of Clairvaux and Arnold of Brescia
- Further anecdotes of the Cistercians, Benedictines, Grandmontines and Carthusians
- Gilbert of Sempringham and his Order
- The heretic or robber bands known as Routiers, Brabantians or Brabazons
- The heretics called Publicans and Patarines; this section includes a tale of devil-worship which illustrates the development of medieval ideas of witchcraft
- Narrative of a meeting with the Waldensians, who had come to the Third Lateran Council at Rome in 1179 to petition Pope Alexander III for the right to preach
- Story told by Philip of Naples of a meeting in Montenegro with three hermits, a Frenchman, an Englishman and a Scot

=== Distinctio secunda ===
- Prologue
- Anecdote of Gregory, a monk of Gloucester
- Anecdotes of Peter of Tarentaise
- Anecdote about a hermit, a demonic pet snake, and foolish charity
- A meeting with Luke of Hungary (afterwards archbishop of Esztergom) at Gerard la Pucelle's lectures at the University of Paris; Luke's later encounters with the warring royal family of Hungary, Géza II, his sons István III and Béla III and brothers László II and István IV, as told to Walter Map by Hugh of le Mans, bishop of Acre
- Welsh religious practices, as exemplified by a retainer in the household of William de Braose, Lord of Bramber
- Helya, a Welsh hermit in the Forest of Dean
- Tale about Cadoc, Welsh king and saint
- Tale of the Welshman Gwestin Gwestiniog and his fairy bride; the tale of their son Triunein Vagelauc, his service at the court of the king of Deheubarth, and an attack on King Brychan of Brycheiniog (i.e., Brecknock)
- Tales of Wild Edric, his fairy bride, and their son Alnoth; with a brief discussion of incubi and succubi
- Brief meditation on fantastic narratives and their theological implications; tale of a knight of "Lesser Britain" (i.e., Brittany) who rescued his dead wife from the fairies
- Tale of demonic infanticide
- Tale of Saint Anthony, who encountered both a centaur and (apparently) Pan while searching for Saint Paul
- Anecdote about an unknown knight at a tournament in Louvain
- The legendary fighter Gado and a supposed Roman invasion of Offa's kingdom
- Tales of Andronikos I Komnenos
- Gillescop the Scot
- The Welsh and their hospitality
- Tales of King Llywelyn and his wife; with a reminiscence of a discussion of the Welsh between Walter Map and Thomas Becket
- Tales from South Wales: Conan the Fearless, Cheveslin the Thief, and a story from Hay-on-Wye
- Revenants, citing Gilbert Foliot and Roger, bishop of Worcester
- Revenant from the Historia Caroli Magni (pseudo-Turpin)
- A ghost story from Northumberland
- The benefits of not following proverbial advice
- Brief conclusion in which Walter calls himself a "huntsman" (venator) who brings home game for the reader

=== Distinctio tertia ===
- Prologue; a brief justification of fiction and its pleasures
- The friendship of Sadius and Galo
- The quarrels of Parius and Lausus
- The story of Raso the vavasour and his wife
- The story of Rollo and his wife

=== Distinctio quarta ===
- Autobiographical prologue and "epilogue"
- Copy of the letter (sometimes found among the works of Saint Jerome) in which Valerius advises Rufinus against marriage
- Story of the boy Eudo deceived by the Devil
- Story of a Cluniac monk (already told in Distinctio prima)
- Story of a knight of "Lesser Britain" (i.e., Brittany) who rescued his dead wife from the fairies (already told in Distinctio secunda)
- Story of Henno-with-the-Teeth (probably the Norman nobleman Hamon Dentatus) and his Melusine-like wife
- Story of Wild Edric and his fairy bride; with a description of their interview with King William I (already told in Distinctio secunda but here the tale includes details not found in the earlier account)
- Story of Gerbert of Aurillac (Pope Sylvester II) deceived by the Devil
- Story of the cobbler of Constantinople
- Story of the merman Nicholas Pipe; anecdotes about phantom herds of animals; story of King Herla (already told in Distinctio prima); a brief satire on the court of King Henry II
- Story of Salius
- Story of Alan, so-called King of Brittany (apparently Alan Fergant)
- Story of the merchants Sceva and Ollo

=== Distinctio quinta ===
- Prologue; reflections on fame and the chansons de geste
- Story of the unidentified Apollonides, rex in partibus occidentis ("a king of the western regions")
- Life and character of Godwin, Earl of Wessex
- Life of Canute the Great and his dealings with Godwin
- Henry I of England and Louis VI of France
- The death of William II of England, regum pessimus ("the worst of kings"); Map's first-hand account of the character of King Henry II; and Map's description of his own running dispute with Henry's illegitimate son Geoffrey
- A satirical comparison of the court of King Henry II with Hell (essentially a rough draft of the opening of Distinctio prima). This concluding chapter begins with a citation of the words of Saint Augustine: "I am in the world and I speak of the world, but I do not know what the world is".

== Editions and translations ==
- Mapes, Gualteri. De nugis curialium distinctiones quinque. Latin text edited, with a preface, by Thomas Wright. London, Camden Society, 1850. At the Internet Archive; also at the Internet Archive: archive.org.
- Map, Walter. De nugis curialium. Latin text edited, with a preface, by Montague Rhodes James. Oxford, Clarendon Press, 1914. Anecdota Oxoniensia, Medieval and Modern Series, 6. At the Internet Archive.
- Map, Walter. Walter Map's De nugis curialium. Translated by Montague R. James. With historical notes by John Edward Lloyd. Edited by E. Sidney Hartland. London, Honourable Society of Cymmrodorion, 1923. Cymmrodorion Record Series no. 9 (translation). At the Internet Archive.
- Map, Walter. De nugis curialium. Edited and translated by M. R. James. Revised by C. N. L. Brooke and R. A. B. Mynors. Oxford: Clarendon Press, 1983. (Latin text and facing-page English translation). At the Internet Archive.
