= Hyakki Yagyō =

Idiom of Japanese folklore: a mass parade of supernatural creatures

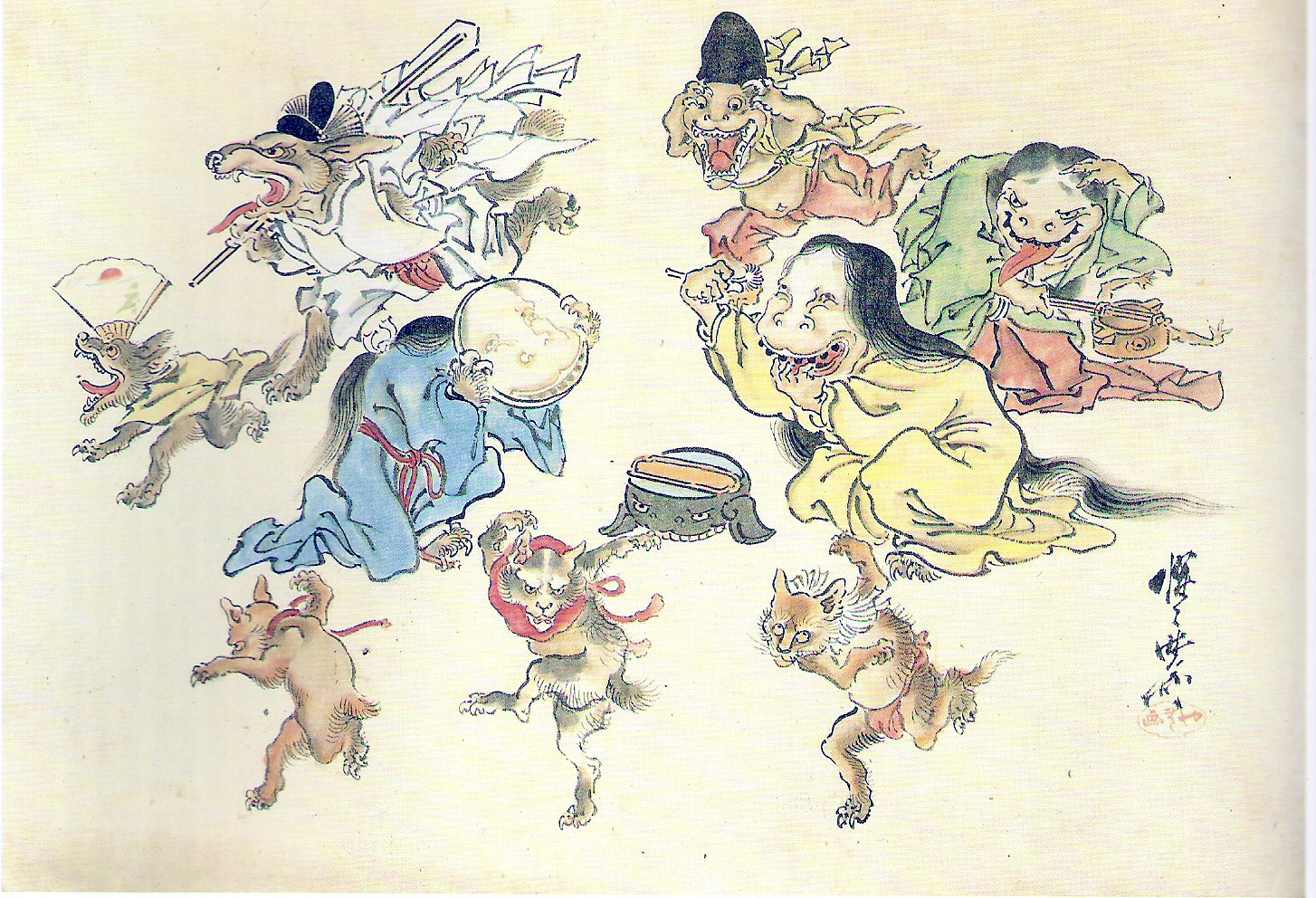
"Hyakki Yagyō" by Kawanabe Kyōsai

Hyakki Yagyō (百鬼夜行, "Night Parade of One Hundred Demons"), also transliterated Hyakki Yakō, is an idiom in Japanese folklore. Sometimes an orderly procession, other times a riot, it refers to a parade of thousands of supernatural creatures known as oni and yōkai that march through the streets of Japan at night. As a terrifying eruption of the supernatural into the real world, it is similar (though not precisely equivalent) to the concept of pandemonium in English.

== Various legends ==
Over more than one thousand years of history, and its role as a popular theme in traditional storytelling and art, a great deal of folklore has developed around the concept, making it difficult if not impossible to isolate any canonical meanings.

One legend of recent vintage states that "every year the yōkai Nurarihyon, will lead all of the yōkai through the streets of Japan during summer nights." Anyone who comes across the procession would perish or be spirited away by the yōkai, unless protected by exorcism scrolls handwritten by Onmyōji spell-casters. It is said that only an onmyōji clan head is strong enough to pass Nurarihyon's Hyakki Yagyō unharmed.

According to another account in the Shūgaishō (拾芥抄), a medieval Japanese encyclopedia, the only way to be kept safe from the night parade if it were to come by your house is to stay inside on the specific nights associated with the Chinese zodiac or to chant the magic spell: "KA-TA-SHI-HA-YA, E-KA-SE-NI-KU-RI-NI, TA-ME-RU-SA-KE, TE-E-HI, A-SHI-E-HI, WA-RE-SHI-KO-NI-KE-RI" (カタシハヤ, エカセニクリニ, タメルサケ, テエヒ, アシエヒ, ワレシコニケリ).

== In literature ==
The Hyakki Yagyō has appeared in several tales collected by Japanese folklorists.

- Uji Shūi Monogatari (宇治拾遺物語), in which a monk encounters a group of a hundred yōkai which pass by the Ryūsenji temple.
- Konjaku Monogatarishū (今昔物語集), which tells that during the Jōgan era (859–877), the eldest son of minister Fujiwara was on his way to his lover's place when he saw 100 demons walking from the direction of the main street. Since his attire had the sonjoushi written on it, the demons who noticed it ran away.
- Ōkagami (大鏡)
- Gōdanshō (江談抄)
- Kohon Setsuwashū (古本説話集)
- Hōbutsushū (宝物集)

== In art ==
The night parade was a popular theme in Japanese visual art.

One of the oldest and most famous examples is the 16th-century handscroll Hyakki Yagyō Zu (百鬼夜行図), erroneously attributed to Tosa Mitsunobu, located in the Shinju-an of Daitoku-ji, Kyoto. For other picture scrolls, the Hyakki Yagyō Emaki (百鬼夜行絵巻), contains the details of each member in the parade from the Muromachi period.

Other notable works in this motif include those by Toriyama Sekien (Gazu Hyakki Yagyō) and Utagawa Yoshiiku. However, Toriyama's work presents yōkai in separate, encyclopedic entries rather than assembled in a parade, while Utagawa's Kokkei Wanisshi-ki ("Comical Record of Japanese History," 滑稽倭日史記) employs the theme of 100 demons to comment on contemporary Japanese military actions in China.

== See also ==
- Konjaku Gazu Zoku Hyakki
- Konjaku Hyakki Shūi
- Gazu Hyakki Tsurezure Bukuro
- Nightmarchers
- Nurarihyon no Mago
- Pom Poko
- Santa Compaña
- Unseelie Court
- Wild Hunt
