= Berchtold =

Berchtold (also Berthold, Bertold, Bertolt) is a Germanic name from the Old High German beruht ('bright' or 'brightly') and waltan ('rule over'). The name came into fashion in the German High Middle Ages from about the 11th century. The cognate Old English name is Berhtwald or Beorhtwald, attested as the name of an archbishop in the 8th century. Berchtold was also the name of the leader of the Wild Hunt in German folklore of the 16th century. The name here replaces the female Perchta.

== People with the given name ==
Notable people with the name or variants include:

- Bertulf (archbishop of Trier) (died 883), in some chronicles attested as "Berthold"
- Blessed Berchtold of Engelberg (died 1197), abbot

== People with the surname ==
- Dietmar Berchtold (born 1974), Austrian football midfielder
- Friedrich von Berchtold (1781–1876), Moravian botanist and physician
- Joseph Berchtold (1897–1963), Nazi Party member and Reich Leader of the SS
- Count Leopold Berchtold (1863–1942), Austro-Hungarian foreign minister at the outbreak of World War I
- Manuela Berchtold (born 1977), Australian freestyle skier

== See also ==
- Perchta, a goddess in Alpine paganism
- Berchtoldstag
