= King Stakh's Wild Hunt =

1964 novel by Uladzimir Karatkievich

- Cover of 2021 Belarusian edition
- Author: Uladzimir Karatkievich
- Language: Belarusian
- Genre: Fantasy, Thriller, Horror
- Publication date: 1964
- Publication place: Belarus
- ISBN: 9789851549272 2021 Belarusian edition

King Stakh's Wild Hunt (Belarusian: Дзікае паляванне караля Стаха) is a novel by author Uladzimir Karatkievich published in 1964. It is based on the Wild Hunt, a motif (Motif E501 in Stith Thompson's Motif-Index of Folk-Literature) that occurs in the folklore of various Northern and Eastern European cultures.

== Plot ==
The story is told on behalf of the main character, Andrej Biełarecki, who is 96 years old at the moment of his narration. The story itself occurred during his youth, in the fall of 1888, somewhere in a remote swampy Belarusian area, when he, a young folklorist, lost his way during a rainstorm and found himself at a family castle of Janoŭskis.

The story takes place at the end of the 19th century. The young scientist, folklorist Andrej Biełarecki, having lost his way during a storm, finds himself in the Janoŭskis' ancestral castle, Bałotnyja Jaliny (Swamp Firs). He is received by the owner of the castle, Nadzieja Janoŭskaja, the last representative of her family. She tells Biełarecki that the Janoŭski family is cursed for twenty generations because of the betrayal committed by her ancestor, Raman the Old, and Nadzieja, a representative of the twentieth generation, expects a quick death, with which the Janoŭski family will end. She talks about the ghosts, the appearance of which heralds her death – the Wild Hunt, the Little Man, and the Blue Woman.

Biełarecki remains in the castle to protect Nadzieja and unravel the tangle of events. He sees the Little Man, a small creature with very long fingers, who looks through the windows at night; and The Blue Woman, descended from an old portrait, to which Nadzieja is very similar. Gradually, Biełarecki gets to know the rest of the inhabitants and Janoŭskaja's relatives: former student Andrej Sviecilovič, majordomo Ihnaś Bierman-Hacevič, her uncle and guardian Ryhor (Hryń) Dubatoŭk, haughty young gentry Alieś Varona, the hunter and tracker Ryhor. One evening in the swamp he is pursued by the Wild Hunt – a group of horsemen who gallop silently, move freely through the bog, make huge jumps and leave traces of ancient horseshoes. Biełarecki miraculously manages to hide in the castle and with renewed energy continues to search for people hiding behind the Wild Hunt. Together with Ryhor, they reveal the secret of the death of Nadzieja's father, driven into a swamp by the Wild Hunt two years before Biełarecki's arrival. Gradually, they learn the secret of the Wild Hunt: it was organized by Dubatoŭk in order to bring the girl to madness or death and take possession of the castle. All the riders were pursued and killed by local men, and Dubatoŭk died in a quagmire under the hooves of the Wild Hunt. The ghosts of the castle also disappear: the Little Man turns out to be Bierman's feeble-minded brother, whom Bierman let out of secret corridors, and the Blue Woman is Nadzieja herself, who wanders the castle in a somnambulistic dream.

Biełarecki takes Nadzieja from the Swamp Firs and marries her. Over time, she heals from constant fear and sleepwalking. By the end of the story, she is pregnant.

== Adaptations ==
A 1979 film shot by Belarusfilm is based on the novel, which gained several international prizes. Karatkievich did not particularly like this adaptation, however the film has become one of the most notable Belarusian films.

In 1989, an opera was staged in Belarusian language. It received the State Prize of the Republic of Belarus.

On 15 September 2023, the premiere of an opera based on the novel was staged in the Barbican theater in London by the Belarus Free Theatre. It was nominated for the 2024 Laurence Olivier Awards.
