= Christ Landed in Grodno =

Novel by Uladzimir Karatkievich

Christ Landed in Grodno (Belarusian: Хрыстос прызямліўся ў Гародні, romanized: Christ Landed in Harodnya) is a historical fantasy novel by Belarusian writer Uladzimir Karatkievich, first published in 1972. The novel is a drama with elements of comedy, a travesty on the Second Coming of Jesus Christ: Yuras Bratchik, a drop-out student, while traveling with a bunch of twelve wandering actors, by a weird coincidence of circumstances is taken for Jesus by Belarusian folk.

== Plot ==
The events are set in the 16th century, during the reign of Polish king Sigismund I the Old. The story line with Yuras Bratchik, a drop-out student, starts when he sees a meteorite falling, out of curiosity, comes to the place of impact, and falls asleep there, because the ground was warmed up. It turns out that some people saw him there. He joins a wandering troupe, but their staging of the Crucifixion of Jesus went awry, because simpleton peasants took it for real. The troupe fled and arrived to Grodno amid hunger riots there, when the merchants claimed that there is no bread in warehouses. Amid skirmishes a Jesuit named Lotr sees the troupe and arrests them for blasphemy.

Unexpectedly, rumors started circulating that the real Christ is to be executed, together with the apostles, based on distorted hearsay about the piece played by Bratchik's troupe; also, some people recognized Bratchik seen by the time and place of the meteorite impact and concluded that he "descended in fire from the heavens". While Lotr hears out the life stories of all "apostles" before deciding to execute them, a crowd assaults the castle where "Christ" is imprisoned demanding his release. The Jesuits were in confusion, because they do not really have Christ, when some of them suggests to present the comedians as real Christ with disciples, in order to clamp the rioting rabble down. And the first miracle performed by "Christ" was to feed the crowd with only five loaves of bread and two fishes, as the merchants claimed they have no more. But the apostles passed bread and fishes through small windows in the "empty" warehouses, to feed everybody. In a similar trickster's way Bratchik repeated some other miracle works of Christ.

== History ==
The novel is a reworked plot of the film with the same name produced in 1967. The film was shelved for political reasons even after a series of remaking, despite its apparent politically correct plot, starting with a hunger riot. Karatkevich kept all drafts, which were re-used in the novel he was writing and which was finished simultaneously with the release of the film. The film, in its final, heavily censored version, was released in 1989, during the perestroika period in the Soviet Union, in Belarusian and Russian versions, with some corrections to restore the original ideas.

== Translations ==
- Russian
  - 1966: Христос сошёл в Гродно, authorised translation by Naum Kislik, serialized in Nyoman literary magazine, 1966, no. 11–12. Other sources give the title Христос приземлился в Гродно.
  - 2006: Христос приземлился в Гродно. Евангелие от Иуды
  - 2021: Христос приземлился в Городне, translated by Pyotr Zholnerovich
- Czech, 1979: Evangelium podle Jidáše aneb Druhý příchod Páně, by Václav Židlický
- Ukrainian, 1988, Христос приземлився в Городні. Євангеліє від Іуди, by Карло Скрипченко (Karlo Skrypchenko)
- Polish, 2012: Chrystus wylądował w Grodnie, by Małgorzata Buchalik
