= Türst =

Ghostly wild huntsman from Swiss-German folklore

Türst (German: [tʏʁst]) is a legendary folkloric figure from the agricultural communities of Lucerne, dating to the pre-Christian era. He is described as a "dreadful huntsman", of whom people should be wary in stormy weather. Türst blows his hunting horn through villages in the tempestuous months preceding Epiphany, accompanied by a baying pack of three-legged hunting dogs. Specific beliefs about him vary from region to region.

== Characteristics ==
Türst's distinguishing features are his threat "drü Schritt rechts, gang uswägs", or, roughly, "step right; get out of my way" in which the careless pedestrian is turned into a member of the dog-pack if he should fail to get out of Türst's way in time. It is also said that barn doors should stay open at this time, enabling Türst to hunt through the barn unhindered. Sträggele, his wife, appears in some Türst legends. Other legends say that Türst terrifies dairy cows, causing them to sicken and cease their milk production.

== Regional variants ==
In Horw, Türst is accompanied by small hounds, a leading hound with only one eye, Türst's wife, Sträggele, a hideous witch, and the Pfaffenkellnerin, the ghost of a deceased parson's mistress with glowing eyes.

He appears in a green hunting costume in Rickenbach, accompanied by a pack of animals which are half dog and half pig.

In Wolhusen, to avoid Türst, the citizens erected crosses. If a cross were to fall, the farmers would have bad luck until the cross stood straight again.

The local people of Pilatus say that Türst is a ghost and a "dreadful huntsman", who drives and bothers the cows such that, for a considerable time, the animals stop producing milk. Hounds accompany him; their tracks are easily identified, as they have only three legs.

Barn doors in Ettiswil are kept open most of the time as the farmers fear they might be torn asunder by Türst's invisible forces.

== See also ==
- Wild Hunt
- Krampus
- Walpurgisnacht
