= Mallt-y-Nos =

Female figure of Welsh mythology

Mallt-y-Nos (Matilda of the Night) is a crone in Welsh mythology who rides with Arawn and the hounds (Cŵn Annwn) of the Wild Hunt, chasing sorrowful, lost souls to Annwn. The Mallt-y-Nos drives the hounds onward with shrieks and wails, which some say are evil and malicious in nature.

Others say that she was once a beautiful but impious noblewoman who loved hunting so much that she said, "If there is no hunting in heaven, I would rather not go!" She is said to have regretted making this wish, and now cries out in misery rather than joy as she hunts forever in the night sky.

== See also ==
- Queen Mab, another female figure sometimes said to participate in the Wild Hunt
- Banshee, a type of wailing female spirit
