= Wild Hunt =

Germanic, Celtic and Slavic folkloric motif

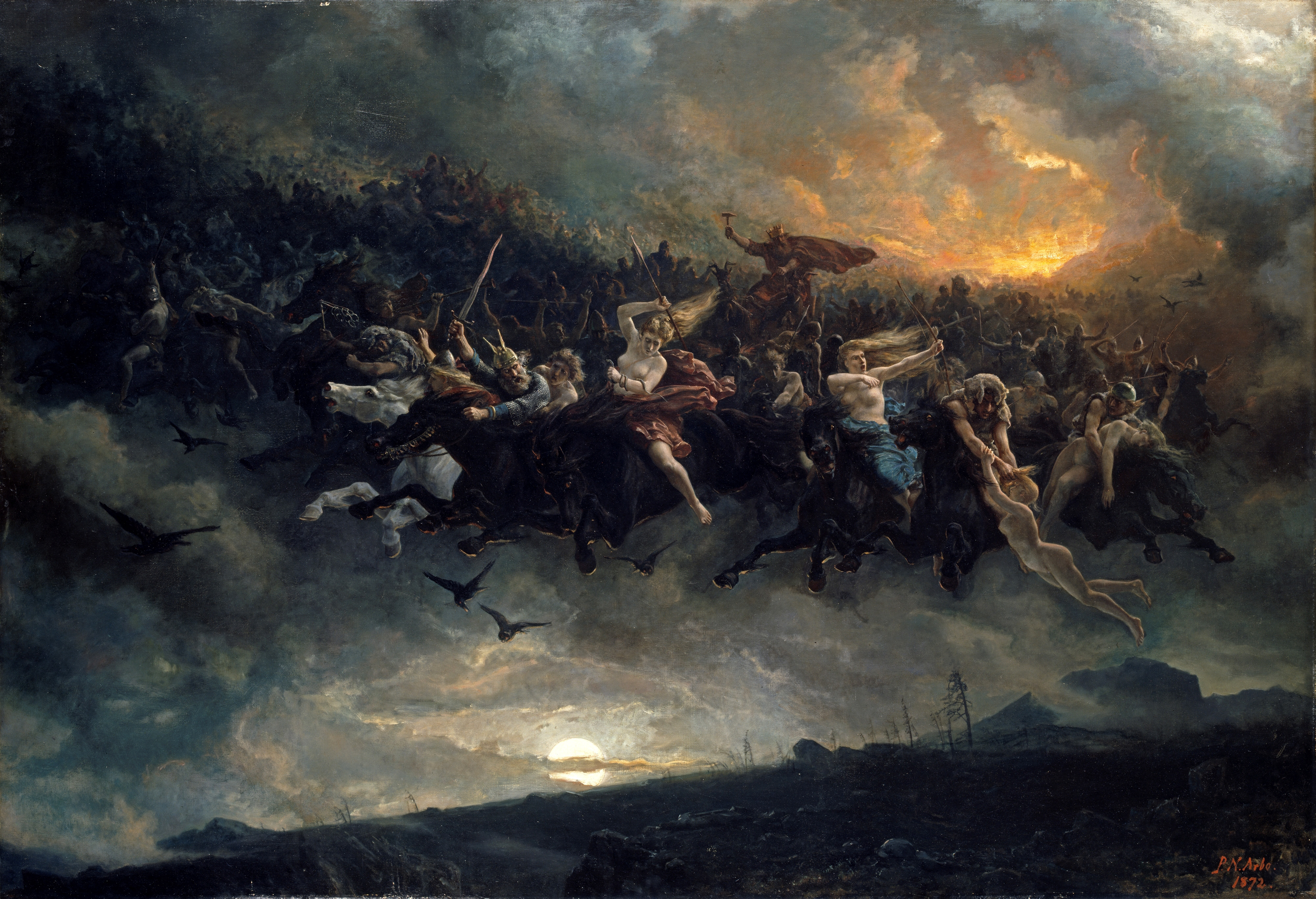
Asgårdsreien [The Wild Hunt of Odin] (1872) by Peter Nicolai Arbo

The Wild Hunt is a folklore motif occurring across various northern, western and eastern European societies, appearing in the religions of the Germanics, Celts, and Slavs (motif E501 per Thompson). Wild Hunts typically involve a chase led by a mythological figure escorted by a ghostly or supernatural group of hunters engaged in pursuit. The leader of the hunt is often a named figure associated with Odin in Germanic legends, but may variously be a historical or legendary figure like Theodoric the Great, the Danish king Valdemar Atterdag, the dragon slayer Sigurd, the psychopomp of Welsh mythology Gwyn ap Nudd, biblical figures such as Herod, Cain, Gabriel, or the Devil, or an unidentified lost soul. The hunters are generally the souls of the dead or ghostly dogs, sometimes fairies, valkyries, or elves.

Seeing the Wild Hunt was thought to forebode some catastrophe such as war or plague, or at best the death of the one who witnessed it. People encountering the Hunt might also be abducted to the underworld or the fairy kingdom. (Note: A girl who saw Wild Edric's Ride was warned by her father to put her apron over her head to avoid the sight.) In some instances, it was also believed that people's spirits could be pulled away during their sleep to join the cavalcade.

The concept was developed by Jacob Grimm in his Deutsche Mythologie (1835) on the basis of comparative mythology. Grimm believed that a group of stories represented a folkloristic survival of Germanic paganism, but this is disputed by other, modern scholars who claim that comparable folk myths are found throughout Northern Europe, Western Europe, and Central Europe. Lotte Motz noted, however, that the motif abounds "above all in areas of Germanic speech." Grimm popularised the term Wilde Jagd ('Wild Hunt') for the phenomenon.

== Comparative evidence and terminology ==
=== Germanic tradition ===
Based on the comparative study of the German folklore, the phenomenon is often referred to as Wilde Jagd (German for 'Wild Hunt/chase') or Wütendes Heer ('Raging Host/army'). The term 'Hunt' was more common in northern Germany and 'Host' was more used in Southern Germany; with however no clear dividing line since parts of southern Germany know the 'Hunt', and parts of the north know the 'Host'. It was also known in Germany as the Wildes Heer ('Wild Army'), its leader was given various identities, including Wodan (or "Woden"), Knecht Ruprecht (compare Krampus), Berchtold (or Berchta), and Holda (or "Holle"). The Wild Hunt is also known from post-medieval folklore.

In England, it was known as Herlaþing (Old English for 'Herla's assembly'), Woden's Hunt, Herod's Hunt, Cain's Hunt, the Devil's Dandy Dogs (in Cornwall), Gabriel's Hounds (in northern England), and Ghost Riders (in North America).

In Scandinavia, the Wild Hunt is known as Oskoreia (commonly interpreted as 'The Asgard Ride'), and as Oensjægeren ('Odin's Hunters'). The names Åsgårdsrei ('Asgard Ride' as attested in parts of Trøndelag), Odens jakt and Vilda jakten (Swedish for 'the hunt of Odin' and 'wild hunt') are also attested. At the very front of Oskoreia rides Guro Rysserova ('Gudrun Horsetail'), often called Guro Åsgard, who is "big and horrid, her horse black and called Skokse".

There is disagreement about the etymology of the word oskorei. The first element has several proposed sources: Åsgård ('Asgard'), oska ('thunder'), or Old Norse ǫskurligr ('dreadful'). The hypothetical Ásgoðreið ('Æsir God Ride') was also once proposed. Only the second element, rei ('ride') from Old Norse reið, is uncontroversial. The word was popularly perceived to be connected to Asgard, as seen in the folk ballad of Sigurd Svein, who is taken to Asgard by Oskoreia and Guro Rysserova.

In the Netherlands and Flanders (in northern Belgium), the Wild Hunt is known as the Buckriders (Dutch: Bokkenrijders) and was used by gangs of highwaymen for their advantage in the 18th century.

=== Europe ===
In Welsh folklore, Gwyn ap Nudd was depicted as a wild huntsman riding a demon horse who hunts souls at night along with a pack of white-bodied and red-eared "dogs of hell". In Arthurian legends, he is the king of the underworld who makes sure that the imprisoned devils do not destroy human souls. A comparable Welsh folk myth is known as Cŵn Annwn (Welsh: "hounds of Annwn").

In France, the "Host" was known in Latin sources as Familia Hellequini and in Old French as Maisnie Hellequin (the "household or retinue of Hellequin"). The Old French name Hellequin was probably borrowed from Middle English Herla king (Old English *Her(e)la-cyning) by the Romance-speaking Norman invaders of Britain. Other similar figures appear in the French folklore, such as Le Grand-Veneur, a hunter who chased with dogs in the forest of Fontainebleau, and a Poitou tradition where a hunter who has faulted by hunting on Sunday is condemned to redeem himself by hunting during the night, along with its French Canadian version the Chasse-galerie.

Among West Slavs, it is known as divoký hon or štvaní (Czech for "wild hunt", "baiting"), dzëwô/dzëkô jachta (Kashubian for "wild hunt"), Dziki Gon or Dziki Łów (Polish). It is also known among the Sorbs and among the South Slavic Slovenes Divja Jaga (Slovene for "the wild hunting party" or "wild hunt"). However, scholars of Slavic folklore have noted it is a motif of foreign, specifically German(ic), origin. In Belarusian, it is called Дзiкае Паляванне ("wild hunt"). As Belarus used to be part of Poland, the motif's presence likely came from there as an intermediary.

In Italy, it is called Caccia Morta ("Dead Hunt"), Caccia infernale ("infernal hunt") or Caccia selvaggia ("Wild Hunt").

In Spain this myth is documented at least since the 13th century, under the name hueste antigua ("Old army"), today estantigua. In Galician it is known as Estantiga (from Hoste Antiga "the old army"), Compaña and Santa Compaña ("troop, company"); Güestia in Asturias; Hueste de Ánimas ("troop of ghosts") in León; and Hueste de Guerra ("war company") or Cortejo de Gente de Muerte ("deadly retinue") in Extremadura.

== Historiography ==
"Another class of specters will prove more fruitful for our investigation: they, like the ignes fatui, include unchristened babes, but instead of straggling singly on the earth as fires, they sweep through forest and air in whole companies with a horrible din. This is the widely spread legend of the furious host, the furious hunt, which is of high antiquity, and interweaves itself, now with gods, and now with heroes. Look where you will, it betrays its connexion with heathenism."

— Folklorist Jacob Grimm.

The concept of the Wild Hunt was first documented by the German folklorist Jacob Grimm who first published it in his 1835 book Deutsche Mythologie. It was in this work that Grimm popularized the term Wilde Jagd ("Wild Hunt") for the phenomenon. Grimm's methodological approach was rooted in the idea, common in nineteenth-century Europe, that modern folklore represented a fossilized survival of the beliefs of the distant past. In developing his idea of the Wild Hunt, Grimm mixed recent folkloric sources with textual evidence dating to the medieval and early modern periods. This approach came to be criticized within the field of folkloristics during the 20th century as more emphasis was placed on the "dynamic and evolving nature of folklore".

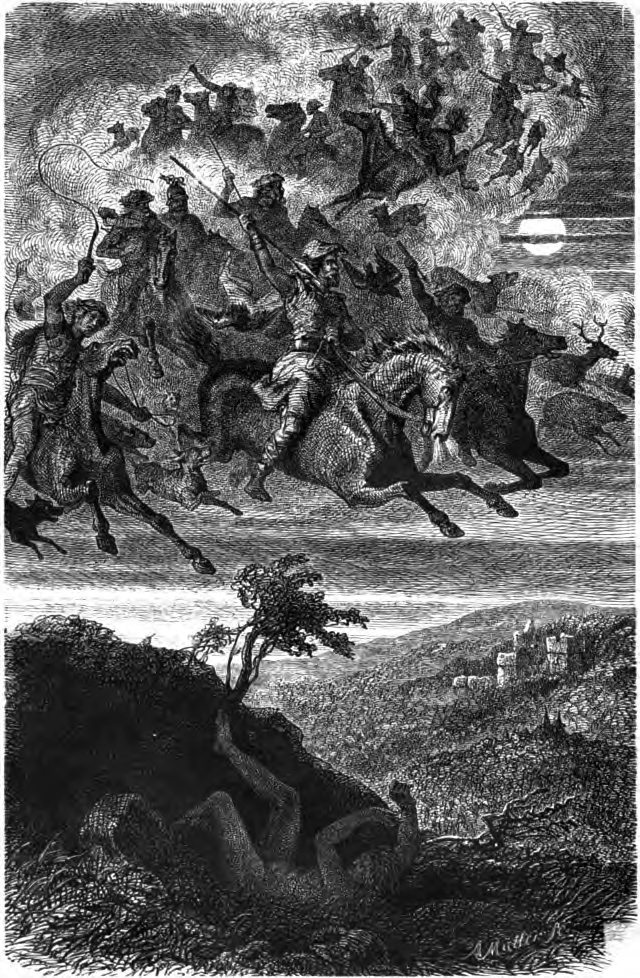
"Wodan's Wild Hunt" (1882) by Friedrich Wilhelm Heine

Grimm posited the Wild Hunt phenomenon as having pre-Christian origins, arguing that the male figure who appeared in it as leader of the Hunt was a survival of folk beliefs about the god Wodan, who had "lost his sociable character, his near familiar features, and assumed the aspect of a dark and dreadful power... a specter and a devil." Grimm believed that this male figure was sometimes replaced by a female counterpart, whom he referred to as Holda and Berchta. In Grimm's words, "not only Wuotan and other gods, but heathen goddesses too, may head the furious host: the wild hunter passes into the wood-wife, Wôden into Frau Gaude.", adding his opinion that this female figure was Woden's wife.

Discussing martial elements of the Wild Hunt, Grimm commented that "it marches as an army, it portends the outbreak of war." He added that a number of figures that had been recorded as leading the hunt, such as "Wuotan, Huckelbernd, Berholt, bestriding their white war-horse, armed and spurred, appear still as supreme directors of the war for which they, so to speak, give license to mankind."

Grimm believed that in pre-Christian Europe, the hunt, led by a god and a goddess, either visited "the land at some holy tide, bringing welfare and blessing, accepting gifts and offerings of the people" or alternately floated "unseen through the air, perceptible in cloudy shapes, in the roar and howl of the winds, carrying on war, hunting or the game of ninepins, the chief employments of ancient heroes: an array which, less tied down to a definite time, explains more the natural phenomenon." He believed that with Christianisation, the Hunt legend was inevitably converted from being that of a "solemn march of gods" to being "a pack of horrid spectres, dashed with dark and devilish ingredients".

A decade earlier than Grimm, Felicia Hemans reflected the Hunt legend in her 1823 poem The Wild Huntsman, specifically linked to the castles of Rodenstein and Schnellerts and to the Odenwald.

In his influential book Kultische Geheimbünde der Germanen (1934), Otto Höfler argued that the German motifs of the "Wild Hunt" should be interpreted as the spectral troops led by the god Wuotan which had a ritualistic counterpart in the living bands of ecstatic warriors (Old Norse berserkir), allegedly in a cultic union with the dead warriors of the past.

Hans Peter Duerr (1985) noted that for modern readers, it "is generally difficult to decide, on the basis of the sources, whether what is involved in the reports about the appearance of the Wild Hunt is merely a demonic interpretation of natural phenomenon, or whether we are dealing with a description of ritual processions of humans changed into demons." Historian Ronald Hutton noted that there was "a powerful and well-established international scholarly tradition" which argued that the medieval Wild Hunt legends were an influence on the development of the early modern ideas of the Witches' Sabbath. Hutton nevertheless believed that this approach could be "fundamentally challenged".

Lotte Motz noted in 1984 that the Hunt motif is found "above all in areas of Germanic speech." While found in areas once settled by Celts, these legends are told less frequently and they are not encountered in the Mediterranean regions, "at least not easily".

== Attestations ==
=== Germany ===
An abundance of different tales of the Wild Hunt has been recorded in Germany. The leader, often called der Schimmelreiter, is generally identified with the god Wotan, but sometimes with a feminine figure: the wife of Wotan, Holda ('the friendly one'; also Holle or Holt), Fru Waur, or Fru Gode in Northern Germany; or Perchta (the bright one; also Berchta, Berhta or Berta) in Southern Germany. The leader also is sometimes an undead noble, most often called Count Hackelberg or Count Ebernburg, who is cursed to hunt eternally because of misbehaviour during his lifetime, and in some versions died from injuries of a slain boar's tusk.

Dogs and wolves were generally involved. In some areas, werewolves were depicted as stealing beer and sometimes food in houses. Horses were portrayed as two-, three-, six-, and eight-legged, often with fiery eyes. In the 'Host' variants, principally found in southern Germany, a man went out in front, warning people to get out of the streets before the coming of the Host's armed men, who were sometimes depicted as doing battle with one another. A feature peculiar to the 'Hunt' version, generally encountered in northern Germany, was the pursuit and capture of one or more female demons, or a hart in some versions, while some others did not have prey at all.

Sometimes, the tales associate the hunter with a dragon or the devil. The lone hunter (der Wilde Jäger) is most often riding a horse, seldom a horse-drawn carriage, and usually has several hounds in his company. If the prey is mentioned, it is most often a young woman, either guilty or innocent. Gottfried August Bürger's ballad Der wilde Jäger describes the fate of a nobleman who dares to hunt on the Sabbath and finds both a curse and a pack of demons deep in the woods. He might also have asked God to let him hunt until Judgement Day, as has ewiger Jäger (the eternal hunter).

The majority of the tales deal with some person encountering the Wild Hunt. If this person stands up against the hunters, he will be punished. If he helps the hunt, he will be awarded money, gold, or, most often, a leg of a slain animal or human, which is often cursed in a way that makes it impossible to be rid of it. In this case, the person has to find a priest or magician able to ban it or trick the Wild Hunt into taking the leg back by asking for salt, which the hunt can not deliver. In many versions, a person staying right in the middle of the road during the encounter is safe. The person might also be warned by Treuer Eckart going ahead of the wild hunt and warning of its approach.

=== Scandinavia ===
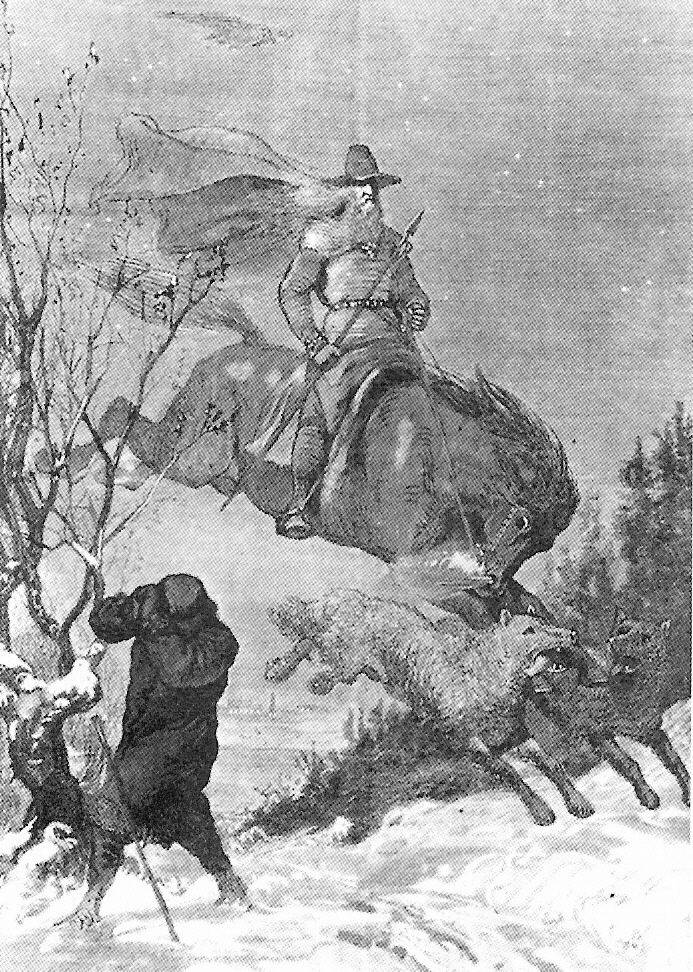
Odin continued to hunt in Norse myths. Illustration by August Malmström.

In Scandinavia, the leader of the hunt was Odin and the event was referred to as Odens jakt (Odin's hunt) and Oskoreia (from Asgårdsreien – the Asgard Ride). Odin's hunt was heard but rarely seen, and a typical trait is that one of Odin's dogs was barking louder and a second one fainter. Besides one or two shots, these barks were the only sounds that were clearly identified. When Odin's hunt was heard, it meant changing weather in many regions, but it could also mean war and unrest. According to some reports, the forest turned silent and only a whining sound and dog barks could be heard.

In western Sweden and sometimes in the east as well, it has been said that Odin was a nobleman or even a king who had hunted on Sundays and therefore was doomed to hunt down and kill supernatural beings until the end of time. According to certain accounts, Odin does not ride, but travels in a wheeled vehicle, specifically a one-wheeled cart.

In parts of Småland, it appears that people believed that Odin hunted with large birds when the dogs got tired. When it was needed, he could transform a bevy of sparrows into an armed host.

If houses were built on former roads, they could be burnt down, because Odin did not change his plans if he had formerly travelled on a road there. Not even charcoal kilns could be built on disused roads, because if Odin was hunting the kiln would be ablaze.

One tradition maintains that Odin did not travel further up than an ox wears his yoke, so if Odin was hunting, it was safest to throw oneself onto the ground in order to avoid being hit, a pourquoi story that evolved as an explanation for the popular belief that persons lying at ground level are safer from lightning strikes than are persons who are standing. In Älghult in Småland, it was safest to carry a piece of bread and a piece of steel when going to church and back during Yule. The reason was that if one met the rider with the broad-rimmed hat, one should throw the piece of steel in front of oneself, but if one met his dogs first, one should throw the pieces of bread instead.

=== Britain ===
In the Peterborough Chronicle, there is an account of the Wild Hunt's appearance at night, beginning with the appointment of a disastrous abbot for the monastery, Henry d'Angely, in 1127:

Many men both saw and heard a great number of huntsmen hunting. The huntsmen were black, huge, and hideous, and rode on black horses and on black he-goats, and their hounds were jet black, with eyes like saucers, and horrible. This was seen in the very deer park of the town of Peterborough, and in all the woods that stretch from that same town to Stamford, and in the night the monks heard them sounding and winding their horns.

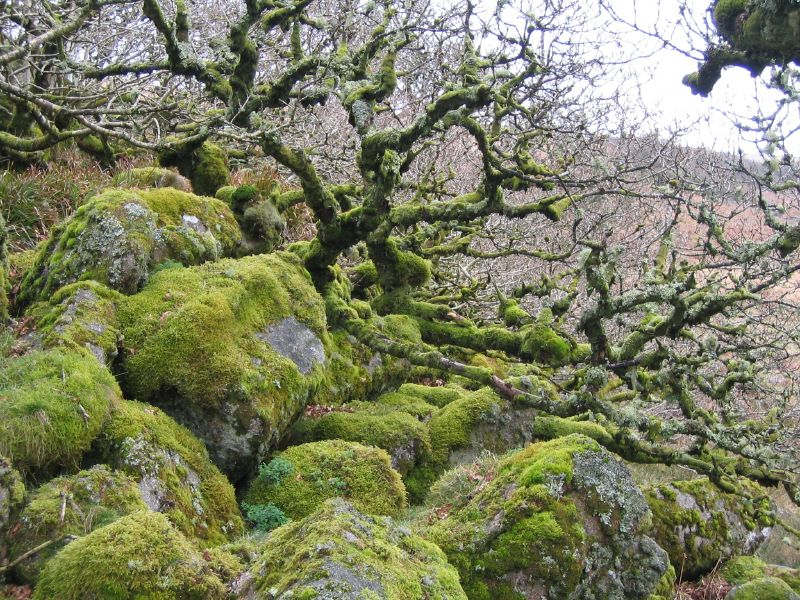
Wistman's Wood in Devon, England

Reliable witnesses were said to have given the number of huntsmen as twenty or thirty, and it is said, in effect, that this went on for nine weeks, ending at Easter. Orderic Vitalis (1075 – c. 1142), an English monk cloistered at St Evroul-en-Ouche, in Normandy, reported a similar cavalcade seen in January 1091, which he said were "Herlechin's troop" (familia Herlechini; cf. Harlequin).

While these earlier reports of Wild Hunts were recorded by clerics and portrayed as diabolic, in late medieval romances, such as Sir Orfeo, the hunters are rather from a faery otherworld, where the Wild Hunt was the hosting of the fairies; its leaders also varied, but they included Gwydion, Gwynn ap Nudd, King Arthur, Nuada, King Herla, Woden, the Devil and Herne the Hunter. Many legends are told of their origins, as in that of "Dando and his dogs" or "the dandy dogs": Dando, wanting a drink but having exhausted what his huntsmen carried, declared he would go to hell for it. A stranger came and offered a drink, only to steal Dando's game and then Dando himself, with his dogs giving chase. The sight was long claimed to have been seen in the area. Another legend recounted how King Herla, having visited the Fairy King, was warned not to step down from his horse until the greyhound he carried jumped down; he found that three centuries had passed during his visit, and those of his men who dismounted crumbled to dust; he and his men are still riding, because the greyhound has yet to jump down.

The myth of the Wild Hunt has through the ages been modified to accommodate other gods and folk heroes, among them King Arthur and, more recently, in a Dartmoor folk legend, Sir Francis Drake. At Cadbury Castle in Somerset, an old lane near the castle was called King Arthur's Lane and even in the 19th century, the idea survived that on wild winter nights the king and his hounds could be heard rushing along with it.

In certain parts of Britain, the hunt is said to be that of hell-hounds chasing sinners or the unbaptized. In Devon these are known as Yeth (Heath) or Wisht Hounds, in Cornwall Dando and his Dogs or the Devil and his Dandy Dogs, in Wales the Cwn Annwn, the Hounds of Hell, and in Somerset as Gabriel Ratchets or Retchets (dogs). In Devon the hunt is particularly associated with Wistman's Wood.

=== Iberia ===
The Santa Compaña (known also in Galician as: Rolda, As da nuite, Pantalla, Avisóns or Pantaruxada; in Asturian as Güestia, Güeste, Güestida or Güéstiga; in Spanish as Estantigua) is a mythical belief in Northwestern Spain and northern Portugal which consists in a procession of ghosts or souls. The procession is led by a living person (usually a parishioner of a particular church) carrying a cross or a cauldron of holy water (sometimes they carry both), followed by several of the souls of the dead holding lit candles.

=== Balkans ===
The South Slavic folklore of the Balkans features a supernatural procession of horsemen known as the Todorci that occurs on the first week of the Great Lent (known as the Todor or St. Theodore Week) and attacks the people who consume or cook meat and dairy products. Sometimes these horsemen are instead depicted as monstrous l centaur-like creatures whose torsos grow out of the horses' backs, not too dissimilarly to the traditional depiction of the Nuckelavee. The horseshoe-shaped wounds inflicted by the hooves of their steeds do not heal naturally; instead, the victim must visit the site of the attack one year later, where the wounds will either magically heal instantaneously if he has been living piously for the previous year, or kill him if he has been living sinfully. They can be defended against with garlic or an improvised cross made from forks or knives.

In Serbia, stories involving the Todorci are generally concentrated in the north-west of the country. They are traditionally depicted as a procession of horsemen whose steeds lack tails. They usually appear on the night between Monday and Tuesday of the Todor Week. They are led by an elder man called Great Todor wearing a white cloak and riding a lame white horse. Certain versions of the story claim that he is St. Theodore himself.

== Interpretations ==
According to scholar Susan Greenwood, the Wild Hunt "primarily concerns an initiation into the wild, untamed forces of nature in its dark and chthonic aspects."

Metamorphoses, cavalcades, ecstasies, followed by the egress of the soul in the shape of an animal—these are different paths to a single goal. Between animals and souls, animals and the dead, animals and the beyond, there exists a profound connection.

— Carlo Ginzburg, Ecstasies: Deciphering the Witches' Sabbath, p. 263.

== Leader of the Wild Hunt ==
- Brittany: King Arthur.
- Catalonia (Spain): Count Arnau (el comte Arnau), a legendary nobleman from Ripollès, who for his rapacious cruelty and lechery is condemned to ride with hounds for eternity while his flesh is devoured by flames. He is the subject of a classic traditional Catalan ballad. In the rest of Spain there are other legends about this same motive (Galician Santa Compaña, Asturian Güestia, Castilian Estantigua, Leonese Estadea...), similarly sometimes you can find some historical figure or mythical hero related.
- England: Woden; Herla; later de-heathenised as a Brythonic King who stayed too long at a fairy wedding feast and returned to find centuries had passed and the lands populated by Englishmen; Wild Edric, a Saxon rebel; Hereward the Wake; King Arthur; Herne the Hunter; St. Guthlac; Old Nick; Jan Tregeagle, a Cornish lawyer who escaped from Hell and is pursued by the devil's hounds. On Dartmoor, Dewer, Old Crockern or Sir Francis Drake.
- France: Artus, King Arthur (Brittany); Mesnée d’Hellequin (Hauts-de-France)
- Germany: Wodan, Berchtold, Dietrich von Bern, Holda, Perchta, Wildes Gjait. The Squire of Rodenstein and Hans von Hackelberg (both Sabbath-breakers).
- Guernsey: Herodias (Rides with witches at sea)
- Lombardy (Italy): King Beatrik, la Dona del Zöch (Lombard: the Lady of the Game).
- Netherlands: Wodan, Gait met de hunties/hondjes (Gait with his little dogs); Derk met de hunties/hondjes (Derk with his little dogs); Derk met den beer (Derk with his boar/bear); het Glujende peerd (the glowing horse); Ronnekemère; Henske met de hondjes/Hänske mit de hond (Henske with his little dogs); Christoph Bernhard von Galen (also known as "Bommen Berend" or "Bombing Bernhard"; the bishop of Münster who laid siege to Groningen in 1672).
- Scandinavia: Odin; Lussi; King Vold (Denmark); Valdemar Atterdag (Denmark); the witch Guro Rysserova and Sigurdsveinen (Norway).
- Wales: Arawn or Gwyn ap Nudd, the Welsh god of the Underworld.
- The Balkans: St. Theodore.
- Slovenia: Jarnik (Jarilo), also called Volčji pastir (Wolf Herdsman). In some variations the mythical wild Baba (similar to Perchta) leads the hunt; in others, the leader of this retinue is a female character named Pehtra.

== Modern influence ==
=== On Santa Claus ===
The role of Wotan's Wild Hunt during the Yuletide period has been theorized to have influenced the development of the Dutch Christmas figure Sinterklaas, and by extension his American counterpart Santa Claus, in a variety of facets. These include his long white beard and his gray horse for nightly rides.

=== In modern paganism ===
"As far as practitioners of nature spiritualities are concerned, the Wild Hunt offers an initiation into the wild and an opening up of the senses; a sense of dissolution of self in confrontation with fear and death, an exposure to a 'whirlwind pulse that runs through life'. In short, engagement with the Hunt is a bid to restore a reciprocity and harmony between humans and nature."

— Susan Greenwood.

Various practitioners of the contemporary pagan religion of Wicca have drawn upon folklore involving the Wild Hunt to inspire their own rites. In their context, the leader of the Wild Hunt is the goddess Hecate. The anthropologist Susan Greenwood provided an account of one such Wild Hunt ritual performed by a modern Pagan group in Norfolk during the late 1990s, stating that they used this mythology "as a means of confronting the dark of nature as a process of initiation." Referred to as the "Wild Hunt Challenge" by those running it, it took place on Halloween and involved participants walking around a local area of woodland in the daytime, and then repeating that task as a timed competition at night, "to gain mastery over an area of Gwyn ap Nudd's hunting ground". If completed successfully, it was held that the participant had gained the trust of the wood's spirits, and they would be permitted to cut timber from its trees with which to make a staff. The anthropologist Rachel Morgain reported a "ritual recreation" of the Wild Hunt among the Reclaiming tradition of Wicca in San Francisco.

== In popular culture ==
The Åsgårdsreien, Peter Nicolai Arbo's 1872 oil painting, depicts the Scandinavian version of the Wild Hunt, with Thor leading the hunting party. This painting is featured on the cover of Bathory's 1988 album, Blood Fire Death.

=== Music ===
The Wild Hunt is the subject of Transcendental Étude No. 8 in C minor, "Wilde Jagd" (Wild Hunt) by Franz Liszt, and appears in Karl Maria von Weber's 1821 opera Der Freischütz and in Arnold Schoenberg's oratorio Gurre-Lieder of 1911. César Franck's orchestral tone poem Le Chasseur maudit (The Accursed Huntsman) is based on Gottfried August Bürger's ballad Der wilde Jäger.

In act 1 of Richard Wagner's 1870 opera Die Walküre, Siegmund relates that he has been pursued by “Das wütende Heer”, which is an indication to the audience that it is Wotan himself who has called up the storm which has driven him (Siegmund) to Hunding's dwelling.

The subject of Stan Jones' American country song "Ghost Riders in the Sky" of 1948, which tells of cowboys chasing the Devil's cattle through the night sky, resembles the European myth.

Swedish folk musician The Tallest Man on Earth released an album in 2010 entitled The Wild Hunt, and in 2013 the black metal band Watain, also Swedish, released an album with the same title. German folk band Versengold released the song "Die wilde Jagt" in 2021, as the first single from their 2022 album Was kost die Welt. English doom metal band, Green Lung, have a song called “Hunters in the Sky”on their 2023 album This Heathen Land.

=== Comics ===
The Wild Hunt appears in Marvel Comics, primarily the Thor series, and is led by Malekith the Accursed, the Dark Elf King of Svartalfheim and one of Thor's archenemies.

In Mike Mignola's comic book series Hellboy, two versions of the Wild Hunt myth are present. In The Wild Hunt, the hero receives an invitation from British noblemen to partake in a giant hunting called "The Wild Hunt", after the legend of "Herne, god of the Hunt". In King Vold, Hellboy encounters "King Vold, the flying huntsman" whose figure is based on the Norwegian folktale of "The Flying Huntsman (headless King Volmer and his hounds)" according to Mignola.

The Wild Hunt was adapted for the Grace Note portion of The Case Files of Lord El-Melloi II anime adaptation with the 4th and 5th episodes where Lord El-Melloi II (voiced by Daisuke Namikawa) helps a fellow magus teacher by the name of Wills Pelham Codrington (voiced by Tomoaki Maeno) in a case involving his father's home where the leylines have become unstable. It is there they encounter Black Dogs, the incarnation of lightning who have been killing people in the vicinity. With the help of his allies, Wills, and a fairy they encounter names Faye, Lord El-Melloi II manages to solve the case and avert the threat.

=== Film and television ===
Episode 5 of the BBC series shown in 1958/59, Quatermass and the Pit, written by Nigel Neale, is entitled "The Wild Hunt" and makes frequent mention of the myths described here.

The Wild Hunt is a Canadian horror drama film of 2009 by director Alexandre Franchi.

The MTV series Teen Wolf features the Wild Hunt as the main villains of the first half of season 6. It takes the legend a bit further, claiming that the Wild Hunt erases people from existence, and those taken by the Wild Hunt become members after they are erased and forgotten.

The Wild Hunt features heavily in Netflix's Little Witch Academia episode "Sky War Stanship", in which the main protagonist Akko Kagari and Constanze Amalie Von Braunschbank Albrechtsberger partake in the hunt itself.

=== Literature ===
The protagonist of Jeremias Gotthelf's novel Kurt of Koppigen (1844) experiences a vivid nightmare in which a massive gate opens in the forest, and a troop of mounted hunters emerges with a pack of dogs having human faces; these represent the people he wronged during his lifetime, who capture and dismember him, transforming him into a dog himself—now forced to hunt his own wife and children, who have been emerged from his severed limbs.

"The Bewitched Huntsman" and "Three Ivory Bobbins" are two interconnected tales in which a boy uses a magic spool to free his parent condemned by the witch Paggia Paggiola to an eternal hunt in the forest with his men and His pack of dogs; these stories appear in Little Mr. Thimblefinger and His Queer Country (1894), a fairy-tale collection by Joel Chandler Harris featuring a framing narrative that includes an now old Brer Rabbit.

In J.R.R. Tolkien's The Hobbit, while traveling through Mirkwood, the dwarves and Bilbo encounter a deer running through the forest, which knocks Bombur into the enchanted river. After they pull him out, they hear far off the sound of a "great hunt" and the baying of dogs going past them.

In The Deluge (1886) by Henryk Sienkiewicz, the motif of the Wild Hunt appears, as a hellish procession of Teutonic knights rushing through the night sky, heralding war and extraordinary disasters.

The description of the Wild Hunt appears in the drama Wesele (The Wedding), by Stanisław Wyspiański. It is described as a race of large knights across the night sky at great speed.

The hunt plays an important role in four of Jim Butcher's Dresden Files novels: (2005 Dead Beat, 2006 Proven Guilty, 2012 Cold Days and 2020 Battle Ground), In Butcher's fictional world, Santa Claus and Odin are the same being. He shares leadership of the hunt with the Goblin King.

Αustralian writer Tim Winton's The Riders (1994), which was shortlisted for the 1995 Booker Prize, mentions a vision of the Wild Hunt that becomes the basis for the main character's own 'wild hunt' of the story.

The Wild Hunt features in The Witcher series of fantasy novels by Andrzej Sapkowski, published in English between 2007 and 2018.

The Wild Hunt features as a fey phenomenon in Larry Correa's Monster Hunter International series in Siege, published in 2017.

The Wild Hunt has appeared in various publications, among them Alan Garner's 1963 novel The Moon of Gomrath, Uladzimir Karatkievich's King Stakh's Wild Hunt, Penelope Lively's 1971 The Wild Hunt of Hagworthy, Susan Cooper's 1973 The Dark is Rising, Diana Wynne Jones' 1975 Dogsbody, Brian Bates' 1983 The Way of Wyrd, Guy Gavriel Kay's Fionavar trilogy (1984–1986), the third issue of Seanan McGuire's series October Daye, An Artificial Night, Fred Vargas's 2011 The Ghost Riders of Ordebec, Laurell K. Hamilton’s book Mistral's Kiss (2006) and Jane Yolen's 1995 The Wild Hunt. It also features in Cassandra Clare's book series, The Mortal instruments (2007–2014) and The Dark Artifices (2016–2018), led by Gwyn ap Nudd. The Wicked Lovely series (2007–2013) by Melissa Marr contains a modern Wild Hunt. It is also a major plot point in Peter S. Beagle's Tamsin. The Wild Hunt is a primary element of R. S. Belcher's novel The Brotherhood of the Wheel and Raymond E. Feist's 1988 novel Faerie Tale. The Wild Hunt is also an important plot point in the Gilded Duology by Marissa Meyer. In Clive Barker's novel Coldheart Canyon, the story is centered around a bizarre version of The Wild Hunt. Also in Sharyn McCrummb's novel GhostRiders, The Wild Hunt is depicted by Civil War soldiers who are constantly reliving the war. Asteria Gonzalez's novel Wolf Rotten features the Wild Hunt as a star-borne host of hunters.

In Lucy Holland’s 2024 historical fantasy novel Song of the Huntress, the Wild Hunt appears with a gender-swapped version of mythical Britonic King Herla as its leader, who has been tricked into taking on that role by Gwyn ap Nudd, king of the Otherworld.

=== Games ===
The hunt is featured in CD Projekt Red's 2015 role-playing video game The Witcher 3: Wild Hunt, based on the books, after being referenced heavily during the events and flashbacks of The Witcher and The Witcher 2: Assassins of Kings. It reveals to be an army of elven conquerors who seek to conquer the world of The Witcher in order to save themselves from a self-spreading spell known as the White Frost, which freezes the worlds and devastates them.

In the original Advanced Dungeons & Dragons (1st Edition) expansion "Deities and Demigods" the Wild Hunt is represented under the Celtic Mythos sections as the Master of the Hunt and the Pack of the Wild Hunt. Players risk a chance of becoming the hunted, or may be compelled to join the Hunt and track down the source of the evil that summoned it, or if that evil is not found, participate in the slaughter of an innocent person or large game animal, potentially against their alignment and will.

In The Elder Scrolls series of role-playing video games, the Wild Hunt is a ritual performed by the Bosmer (wood elves) for war, vengeance, or in times of desperation. The elves are transformed into a horde of horrific creatures that kill all in their path. The Daedric Lord Hircine also performs a Wild Hunt ritual more similar to the Wild Hunt of folklore. This ritual was renamed to the "Great Hunt" with the release of The Elder Scrolls V: Skyrim.

The Wild Hunt is heavily featured and elaborated on in the Obsidian Entertainment video game, Pentiment.

In Assassin's Creed Valhalla it was featured in the seasonal themed update "Oskoreia Festival".

In Limbus Company, the Wild Hunt appears in the third part of the sixth main chapter of the game. It is composed of multiple versions of the chapter's minor antagonists, those being the residents and staff of Wuthering Heights, the chapter's literary source, led by an alternate, parallel world version of the playable character Heathcliff. In the story, his motive for creating the Wild Hunt is to take revenge on the residents of Wuthering Heights across all other alternate worlds, while also hunting down and killing every other version of himself in order to ensure the happiness of every Catherine.

In the action RPG game Genshin Impact, the Wild Hunt appears as an enemy type in the region of Nod-Krai. They are said to be former humans that were cursed and transformed into a powerful manifestation of the Abyss, and are led by Rerir, one of the Five Sinners of Khaenri'ah.

== See also ==
- Angels of Mons
- Four Horsemen of the Apocalypse
- Herne the Hunter
- Hemann
- The Lampades
- Hyakki Yagyō
- List of ghosts
- Mallt-y-Nos, a Welsh version of the legend
- Moss people, wood spirits serving as typical prey of the wild hunt in parts of Germany.
- Nightmarchers
- Valkyrie
- Türst
- Flying Dutchman
- Flying Canoe
