= Uladzimir Karatkievich =

Belarusian writer

- Уладзімір Сямёнавіч Караткевіч
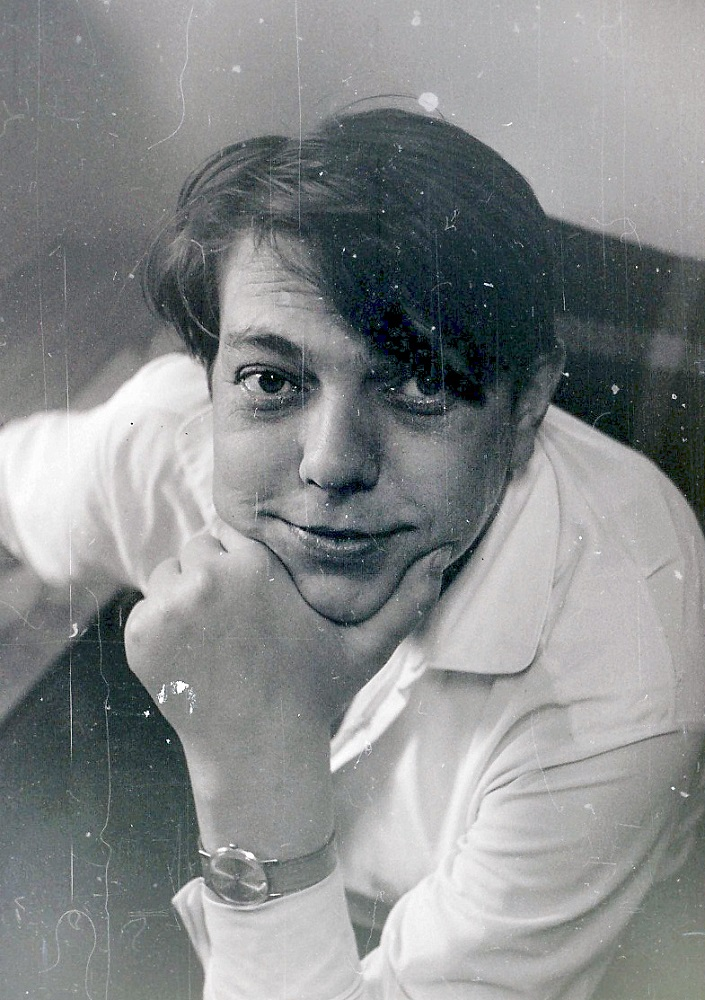
- Uladzimir Karatkievich in 1968
- Born: 26 November 1930; Orsha, Byelorussian Soviet Socialist Republic
- Died: 25 July 1984 (aged 53); Minsk, Byelorussian Soviet Socialist Republic
- Resting place: Eastern Cemetery, Minsk, Belarus
- Citizenship: Soviet Byelorussia
- Education: Kiev State University
- Occupations: Writer, poet, publicist
- Writing career
- Years active: 1951–1984
- Genres: Historical fiction, mystery
- Notable work: King Stakh's Wild Hunt

Uladzimir Karatkievich (Belarusian: Уладзімір Сямёнавіч Караткевіч; Russian: Владимир Семёнович Короткевич; 26 November 1930 – 25 July 1984) was a Belarusian Soviet writer, publicist, poet, translator, dramatist, and screenwriter, recognized as a classic of Belarusian literature. He is considered one of the most prominent figures in 20th-century Belarusian literature and was the first Belarusian writer to explore the genre of historical mystery.

Karatkievich's works are characterized by a romantic focus, a high level of artistic sophistication, patriotic fervor, and a humanistic tone. He significantly enriched Belarusian literature with thematic and genre diversity, imbuing it with intellectual and philosophical depth. Among his most famous works are the novellas King Stakh's Wild Hunt (Belarusian: Дзікае паляванне караля Стаха) and The Grey Legend (Belarusian: Сівая легенда), the novels Ears of Rye Under Your Sickle (Belarusian: Каласы пад сярпом тваім), Christ Landed in Hrodna (Belarusian: Хрыстос прызямліўся ў Гародні), and The Black Castle Alshanski (Belarusian: Чорны замак Альшанскі), and the essay Land Beneath White Wings (Belarusian: Зямля пад белымі крыламі).

== Origins ==
Przyjaciel coat of arms, associated with the Hryniewicz family.

Uladzimir Karatkievich's mother, Nadzeia Vasileuna (Belarusian: Надзея Васілеўна), came from the noble Hryniewicz family (Belarusian: Грыневічы). The earliest documented ancestors were the brothers Ilya Chwiedarowicz and Panka Chwiedarowicz, who in 1551 received a confirmation charter from Grand Duke of Lithuania Sigismund II Augustus confirming their ownership of estates in the Mstsislaw Voivodeship of the Polish-Lithuanian Commonwealth.

Panka's descendant, Tomasz Hryniewicz, was active in local public life in the second half of the 18th century and owned estates in the region. His grandson, Tomasz (Fama Michajłowicz) Hryniewicz (Belarusian: Тамаш (Фама Міхайлавіч) Грыневіч, 1817–1863), was the last verified landowner of the family; he owned the estate Verkhnia Toshchytsa (Belarusian: Верхняя Тошчыца) in the Rogachev Uezd, Russian Empire. He took part in the 1863–1864 uprising and was executed in Rogachev.

This episode inspired Karatkievich to depict an ancestor in the epilogue of the Russian-language novella Prehistory (Russian: Предыстория) and in the prologue of his novel Leonids Will Not Return to Earth (Belarusian: Леаніды не вернуцца да Зямлі). In the latter, the protagonist, Andrei Hrynkevich, is depicted as descending from the Hryniewicz family.

Accounts of Karatkievich's paternal noble origins, known from his personal recollections, differ from information in available records. The paternal ancestors were peasants from the village of Barsuki (Belarusian: Барсукі), located in what is now the Orsha District, Belarus. In official documents, they were recorded as "Karotki," while the family used the form "Karatkievich." His father, Siamion Timafeevich Karatkievich (Belarusian: Сямён Цімафеевіч Караткевіч), later used the surname "Karatkievich" in official service.

== Biography ==
=== Early life and family ===
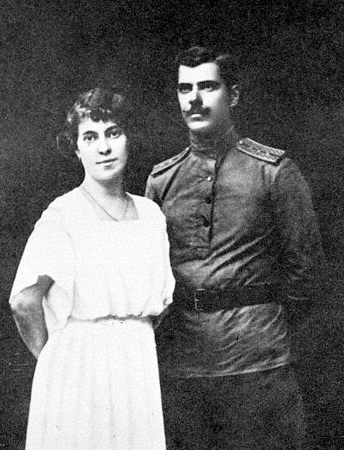
Parents of Uladzimir Karatkievich, 1915

Uladzimir Karatkievich was born on 26 November 1930 in Orsha into an educated family. His father, Siamion Timafeevich (1887–1959), worked as a budget inspector in the Orsha district financial department and had previously served as a scribe in the Imperial Russian Army. His mother, Nadzeia Vasileuna (1893–1977), was a graduate of the Mariinskaya Gymnasium in Mogilev and worked as a rural schoolteacher before dedicating herself to managing the household. Karatkievich had two siblings: Valery (1918–1941) and Natalia (1922–2003). During his childhood, Karatkievich was strongly influenced by his maternal grandfather, Vasily Hrynkevich (Belarusian: Васіль Грынкевіч, 1861–1945), a former provincial treasurer and a storyteller. One such story was the legend of Mother of the Wind (Belarusian: Маці Ветру), which described events of the Krychaw Uprising of 1743–1744 and later appeared in his writings. Vasily Hrynkevich also served as a model for the character Danila Zahorski-Vezha in Karatkievich’s novel Ears of Rye Under Your Sickle. Many of the stories and legends shared by his grandfather inspired Karatkievich's future literary works.

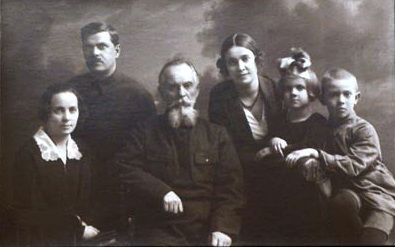
Family portrait, 1928: Karatkievich’s aunt, father, grandfather, sister, and brother Valery

Karatkievich learned to read at the age of three and developed a fascination with history, particularly the history of Belarus. His creative talents manifested early, including writing, drawing, and music. By the age of six, he had written his first poems and later attempted short stories, which he illustrated himself. One of his favorite books as a child was Alfred Brehm’s Life of Animals.

Karatkievich also showed an interest in theater and had some understanding of Yiddish. His sister, Natalia Kuchkouskaya, recalled:

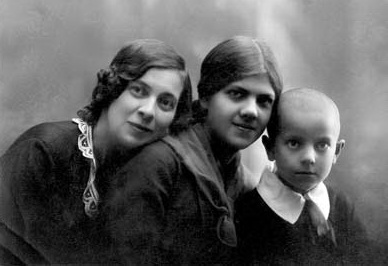
With his mother and sister, 1937

"Occasionally, a Jewish theater would visit our town. Since the Yiddish language was heard daily on the streets of Orsha, we could easily follow the repertoire without a translator. The performances were based on famous works by Sholem Aleichem, such as 'Wandering Stars', ' Tevye the Dairyman', 'Motl the Cantor's Son' and we greatly enjoyed them."

In 1938, Uladzimir Karatkievich began school in Orsha, completing three grades before the outbreak of World War II. During the summer of 1941, he traveled to Moscow to visit his sister, who was studying at a university there. The sudden onset of war interrupted his stay, forcing him to remain in the city. He was subsequently evacuated to the Ryazan region and later to the Ural area near Kungur. During this time, he made several attempts to escape from his boarding house to join the front. For a long period, he had no information about his parents' whereabouts. Eventually, through his maternal aunt Yauheniya Vasilieuna, who lived in the Far East, he discovered that they were in Orenburg.

In August 1943, after significant challenges, Uladzimir and his sister reached Orenburg, where he resumed his studies and completed the sixth grade. Later, he and his mother moved to the recently liberated Kiev, where they briefly stayed with his aunt Yauheniya and her husband, who had also relocated to the city. Decades later, in the autumn of 1972, Karatkievich revisited these memories in his autobiographical novella The Chestnut Leaves (Belarusian: Лісце каштанаў), inspired by his wartime experiences.

=== Student years and literary beginnings ===
In 1949, Uladzimir Karatkevich graduated from secondary school and enrolled in the Russian Department of the Faculty of Philology at Taras Shevchenko Kiev State University, graduating in 1954. He later completed postgraduate studies at the same university. During his student years, Karatkevich distinguished himself as one of the most talented students. He was an avid reader, exploring works by classic authors of world literature, as well as Ukrainian, Russian, Polish, and Belarusian writers. His interests extended beyond literature to history, particularly the history of Belarus. He became familiar with numerous publications on the uprising of 1863–1864.

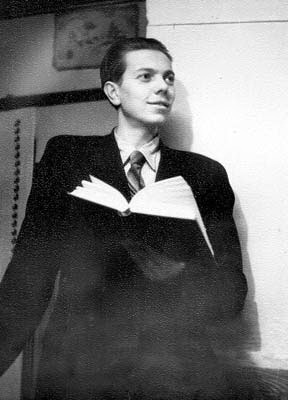
Uladzimir Karatkevich during his student years

In Kiev, Karatkevich continued writing poetry in Belarusian and Russian, attempting also to compose in Ukrainian and Polish. His student research papers delved into literary topics, including the works of Pushkin and Bahdanovich. During this time, he conceived a major historical work to depict the events of the 1863–1864 uprising. In the summer of 1950, after his first year of studies, Karatkevich drafted the initial version of his famous novella The Wild Hunt of King Stakh in his hometown of Orsha.

In 1951, his poems There Will Be a Canal (in Russian) and To Yakub Kolas (in Belarusian) were published in the local newspaper Leninski Pryzyu in Orsha. The summer of 1952, inspired by a trip to Vyazynka—the birthplace of Yanka Kupala—he wrote an essay titled Vyazynka and sent it, along with a letter, to Kupala’s widow, Uladzislava Lutsevich. Around this time, he also submitted a selection of his early works, including fairy tales, poems, and short stories, to Yakub Kolas for feedback.

One of Karatkevich's classmates and friends, Florian Nyauvazhny, noted that Karatkevich was the soul of their group and that his peers admired his courage and principles. Karatkevich reflected on his student years and his deep affection for Ukraine in works such as the novella Spring Awakens Under the Snow (1957), the essay The Chosen One (1982), and essays on Taras Shevchenko (And There Will Be People on Earth, 1964), Lesya Ukrainka (Saxifraga, 1971), and Kiev (My Fair City!, 1982).

In 1954, Karatkevich completed his university studies. His diploma thesis, titled Fairy Tale, Legend, Tradition, sparked mixed reactions but earned the highest grade thanks to the efforts of Academician A. Bialetski and Professor A. Nazarouski. In spring 1955, he passed his candidate exams and began writing a dissertation on the 1863 uprising, which he never finished. Around the same time, the idea of a novel on this subject began to take shape.

After graduating, from 1954 to 1956, Karatkevich worked as a teacher of Russian language and literature in a rural school in the village of Lisavychi in Kiev Oblast, Ukraine. From 1956 to 1958, he taught in Orsha. Later, he pursued studies at the Higher Literary Courses (1958–1960) and the Higher Screenwriting Courses (1962) at the Institute of Cinematography in Moscow (now the Gerasimov Institute of Cinematography). There, he transitioned to becoming a professional writer.

== Career ==
His first published work (a poem) was in 1951, which was followed by three collections of verses. Later, he turned to prose and subsequently published a large number of short stories in collections entitled Chazenia, The Eye of the Typhoon, From Past Ages, and others. He also wrote the novels Unforgettable and The Dark Castle Olshansky. The novel King Stakh's Wild Hunt (Дзікае паляванне караля Стаха, 1964) is probably his most popular work. His novels deal predominantly with Belarus's historical past, including the January uprising of 1863 – 1865.

Karatkievich also wrote a number of plays, essays, articles, screenplays for short and feature films, and detective and adventure stories. Karatkievich's literary works are marked by romanticism, rich imagery, and emotionalism. A recipient of several national literary awards, he has strongly affected the further development of historical themes in Belarusian literature.

== Bibliography ==
=== Novels ===
- (1962) Belarusian: Леаніды не вернуцца да Зямлі (Leonids Will Not Return to Earth)
- (1965) Belarusian: Каласы пад сярпом тваім (Ears of Rye Under Thy Sickle)
- (1972) Belarusian: Хрыстос прызямліўся ў Гародні (Christ Landed in Grodno)
- (1979) Belarusian: Чорны замак Альшанскі (The Black Castle Alshanski)

=== Novellas ===
- (late 1940s – early 1950s) Russian: Предыстория (Prehistory)
- (1964) Belarusian: Дзікае паляванне караля Стаха (The Wild Hunt of King Stakh)
- (1989) Belarusian: У снягах драмае вясна (Spring Sleeps in the Snow)
- (1961) Belarusian: Цыганскі кароль (The Gypsy King)
- (1961) Belarusian: Сівая легенда (The Grey Legend)
- (1981) Belarusian: Зброя (The Weapon)
- (1978) Belarusian: Ладдзя Роспачы (The Boat of Despair)
- (1967) Belarusian: Чазенія (Chazenia)
- (1973) Belarusian: Лісце каштанаў (Chestnut Leaves)
- (1988) Belarusian: Крыж Аняліна (The Cross of Anielin)

=== Short stories ===
- (1946) Russian: Рябина (Rowanberry)
- (1946) Russian: Богун-трава (Bogun Grass)
- (1950) Russian: Любовь Моав (Love of Moab)
- (1950) Russian: Собачья радость (A Dog's Joy)
- (1950) Russian: Бетховен (Beethoven)
- (1950) Russian: Профорг Королев (Trade Union Organizer Korolev)
- (1950) Russian: Это была старая-старая комната… (It Was an Old, Old Room...)
- (1950) Russian: Скрипка поет (The Violin Sings)
- (1950) Russian: Клен (Maple)
- (1950) Russian: Руки (Hands)
- (1950s) Russian: Девушка из Быхова (The Girl from Bykhov)
- (1950s) Russian: Когда бароны поняли… (When the Barons Understood...)
- (1950s) Russian: Письмо из развалин Пиллен (A Letter from the Ruins of Pillen)
- (1950s) Russian: Ягица, трепетная моя лань!.. (Jagitsa, My Trembling Doe!)
- (1952) Belarusian: Дзядуля (Grandfather)
- (1952) Belarusian: Паляшук (The Poleshuk)
- (1950s) Belarusian: Венус паўночная (Northern Venus)
- (1956) Belarusian: Нямыя браты (Silent Brothers)
- (1958) Belarusian: Завеі (Blizzards)
- (1958) Belarusian: Карней — мышыная смерць (Karney – Death of Mice)
- (1958) Belarusian: Лятучы галандзец (The Flying Dutchman)
- (1958) Belarusian: Лясная гісторыя (A Forest Story)
- (1959) Belarusian: Госць прыходзіць на золкім світанні (A Guest Comes at a Gloomy Dawn)
- (1959) Belarusian: Подыхі продкаў (The Breaths of Ancestors)
- (1959) Belarusian: Аліва і меч (The Olive and the Sword)
- (1959) Belarusian: Пасмяротная гісторыя аднаго цецерука (The Posthumous Story of a Grouse)
- (1959) Belarusian: Белае Полымя (White Flame)
- (1959) Belarusian: Як звяргаюцца ідалы (How Idols Are Overthrown)
- (1959) Belarusian: Лісты не спазняюцца ніколі (Letters Never Arrive Late)
- (1959–1960) Belarusian: Ідылія ў духу Вато (An Idyll in the Spirit of Watteau)
- (1960) Belarusian: У шалашы (In the Hut)
- (1960) Belarusian: Блакіт і золата дня (The Blue and Gold of the Day)
- (1961) Belarusian: Маленькая балерына (The Little Ballerina)
- (1962) Belarusian: Вось і ўсё (That's All)
- (1962) Belarusian: Як поле перайсці (How to Cross a Field)
- (1962) Belarusian: Кніганошы (Book Carriers)
- (1963) Belarusian: Барвяны шчыт (The Scarlet Shield)
- (1963) Belarusian: Залаты бог (The Golden God)
- (1964) Belarusian: Сіняя-сіняя (Blue-Blue)
- (1969) Belarusian: Краіна Цыганія (The Land of Gypsies)
- (1970) Belarusian: Былі ў мяне мядзведзі (I Had Bears Once)
- (1970) Belarusian: Вока тайфуна (The Eye of the Typhoon)
- (1970) Belarusian: Вялікі Шан Ян (The Great Shang Yang)
- (1973) Belarusian: Калядная рапсодыя (Christmas Rhapsody)

=== Essays ===
- (1972) Ukrainian: Земля під білими крилами (The Land Under White Wings)
- Belarusian: Вільнюс — часцінка майго сэрца (Vilnius — A Part of My Heart)
- Belarusian: Вязынка (Vyazynka)
- Belarusian: Званы ў прадоннях азёр (Bells in the Depths of Lakes)
- Belarusian: Казкі Янтарнай краіны (Tales of the Amber Land)
- Belarusian: Мой се градок! (My Se Hradok!)
- Belarusian: Рша камен… (Rsha Stone...)
- Belarusian: Абдуванчык на кромцы вады (The Dandelion at the Water's Edge)
- Belarusian: Людзям простым к добраму навучанню (To Simple People for Good Teaching)
- Belarusian: Гэта было 10-га сакавіка 1864 года… (It Happened on the 10th of March 1864...)
- Belarusian: З вадой і без вады (With Water and Without Water)
- Belarusian: Коласаўцы (Kolasa’s People)
- Belarusian: Мова (што я думаю пра цябе) (Language (What I Think About You))
- Belarusian: Наш агульны клопат (Our Common Concern)
- Belarusian: Родная мова (The Native Language)
- Belarusian: Ці дажывем да ста год, або пасмяротнае рыданне (Will We Live to Be a Hundred, or a Posthumous Lament)

=== Poetry Collections ===
- (1958) Belarusian: Матчына душа (Mother's Soul)
- (1960) Belarusian: Вячэрнія ветразі (Evening Sails)
- (1969) Belarusian: Мая Іліяда (My Iliad)
- (1986) Belarusian: Быў. Ёсць. Буду. (Was. Is. Will Be.)
- (1987) Belarusian: Паэзія розных гадоў (Poetry of Different Years)

=== Tales ===
- (1952) Belarusian: Лебядзіны скіт (The Swan Hermitage)
- (1952) Belarusian: Вужыная каралева (The Snake Queen)
- (1952) Belarusian: Аўтух-дамоўнік (Autukh the House Spirit)
- (1952) Belarusian: Казка пра Пятра-разбойніка (The Tale of Peter the Robber)
- (1952) Belarusian: Надзвычайная котка (The Extraordinary Cat)
- (1952) Belarusian: Мужык і дзіва аднавокае (The Peasant and the One-Eyed Wonder)
- (1952) Belarusian: З вобразаў казак (From the Images of Fairy Tales)
- (1973) Belarusian: Чортаў скарб (The Devil's Treasure)
- (1973) Belarusian: Верабей, сава і птушыны суд (The Sparrow, the Owl, and the Bird Trial)
- (1977) Belarusian: Пасварыліся — памірыліся (Quarreled — Reconciled)
- (1977) Belarusian: Бліны на дрэве, грушы на вярбе (Pancakes on a Tree, Pears on a Willow)
- (1977) Belarusian: Скрыпка дрыгвы й верасовых пустэчаў (The Violin of the Swamp and Heather Wastelands)
- (1977) Belarusian: Кацёл з каменьчыкамі (The Pot with Pebbles)
- (1980) Belarusian: Нямоглы бацька (The Helpless Father)
- (1980) Belarusian: Вясна ўвосень (Spring in Autumn)
- (1980) Belarusian: Жабкі і Чарапаха (The Frogs and the Tortoise)
- (1981) Belarusian: Пра Пана Галавана (About Pan Galavan) (co-written with Aleh Loyka)

=== Legends ===
- (1956) Belarusian: Маці Ветру (The Mother of the Wind)
- (1961) Belarusian: Легенда аб бедным д’ябле і аб адвакатах Сатаны (The Legend of the Poor Devil and the Advocates of Satan)

== Sources ==
- Верабей, А. Л. (2005). Уладзімір Караткевіч. Жыццё і творчасць (PDF). Беларуская навука. p. 271. ISBN 985-08-0666-4.
- Макаревич, Александр Николаевич; Ефимова, Маргарита Борисовна (2008). Беларуская дзіцячая літаратура. Вышэйшая школа. pp. 459–481. ISBN 978-985-06-1440-7.
