= Maksim Łužanin =

Belarusian writer

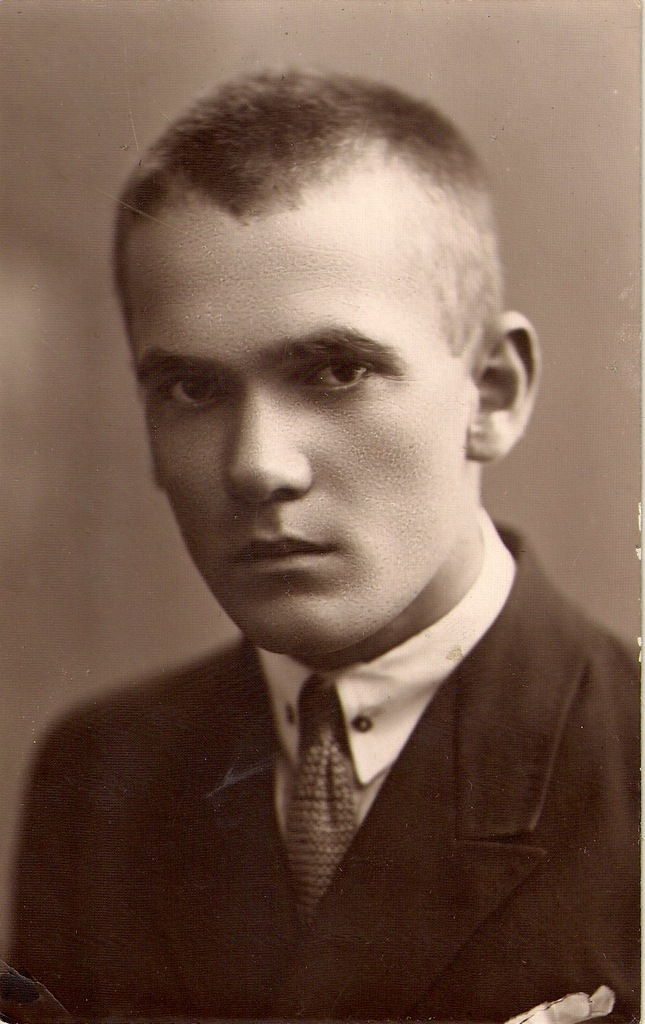
Maksim Łužanin

Maksim Łužanin (born Alaksandar Amvrośjevič Karataj, Belarusian: Максім Лужанін, Maksim Luzhanin (Алякса́ндар Амвро́сьевіч Карата́й), 2 November 1909, Prusy – 13 October 2001, Minsk) was a Belarusian prose writer, poet, screenwriter, translator, essayist, and a literary critic. In 1969, he was awarded for the Honored Artist of the Byelorussian SSR and in 1975, Łužanin was awarded with the honorary badge Meritorious Activist of Culture of Polish People's Republic.

== Biography ==
He was born on 20 October 1909 in the village Prusy, modern-day Salihorsk District, Minsk Region in Belarus.

His notable poems include Kroki (Shari, 1928) and Adnahałosna (1931). Łužanin's poems were written in Russian and Polish languages. In 1928, he studied at Minsk Belarusian Pedagogial College.

In 1933, he met his wife Jaŭhienija Pflaumbaum in Siberia.

He studied at the literary-linguistic department and graduated at Belarusian State University. He participated in the literary association Maładniak and Uzvyšša. He worked at the magazine company "Uzvyšša" magazine in 1930 until 1931 and from 1931 until 1933, he was a broadcaster at the Belarusian radio.

Łužanin was arrested by OGPU (Soviet secret police) in 1933, charged with membership in a counter-revolutionary organization and sentenced to 2 years of exile to Mariinsk (now in Kemerovo Oblast). He was released a few months later.

He worked as an editor of the main edition of the literature on mechanical engineering in Moscow, Soviet Union. He was in rehab by 1956. During World War II, he was taken into red army until 1944. He later worked as a deputy of the Culture Department in the Russian newspaper Zvezda and executive of the magazine Vožyk at National Academy of Sciences of Belarus. For 12 years from 1959 until 1971, he worked as a member and editor-in-chief of the film studio Belarusfilm. In 1968, he attended at the 22nd session of the UN General Assembly. His stories were adapted upon the screenplay Paŭlinka (1951) and The People's Poem (1952).

He died at his home in Minsk, aged 91 on 13 October 2001.
