= Walter Map =

Welsh writer and courtier (1130 – c. 1209/10)

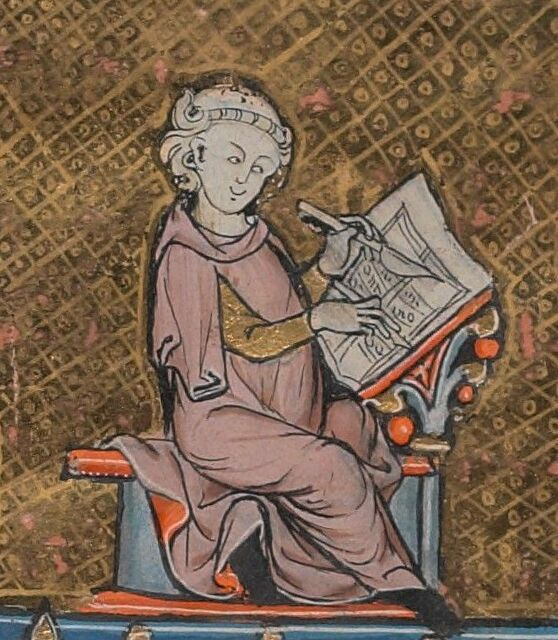
- Miniature, 1290s
- Born: c. 1130; Welsh Marches, Wales
- Died: Between 1209 and 1210
- Occupations: Clergyman, writer

Walter Map (Latin: Gualterius Mappus; 1130 – c. 1209/1210) was a medieval writer. He wrote De nugis curialium, which takes the form of a series of anecdotes of people and places, offering insights into the history of his time.

Map was a courtier of King Henry II of England, who sent him on missions to Louis VII of France and to Pope Alexander III. Map became the Archdeacon of Oxford in 1196.

== Life ==
Map claimed Welsh origins and called himself a man of the Welsh Marches (marchio sum Walensibus). He was probably born in southwestern Herefordshire. Medievalist Joshua Byron Smith suggests that Map may have begun his studies at St Peter's Abbey in Gloucester before continuing at the University of Paris, apparently around 1154, when Gerard la Pucelle was teaching there. After his return from France, Map was employed as a clerk by Gilbert Foliot, the Bishop of Hereford, who was a former Abbot of St Peter's. When Foliot was translated to the Diocese of London in 1163, Map followed him.

Map then became one of the clerks of the royal household and by 1173 he was an itinerant justice. As a courtier of King Henry II of England, he was sent on missions to Louis VII of France and to Pope Alexander III, and attended the Third Lateran Council in 1179, encountering a delegation of Waldensians. On this journey he stayed with Henry I of Champagne, who was then about to undertake his last journey to the Levant.

Map held a prebend in the Diocese of Lincoln by 1183 and was Chancellor of the Diocese by 1186. He later became Precentor of Lincoln, a canon of St Paul's, London, and of Hereford, and Archdeacon of Oxford in 1196.

Map was a candidate to succeed William de Vere as Bishop of Hereford in 1199, but was unsuccessful. He was once again a candidate for a bishopric in 1203, this time as Bishop of St David's, but was not chosen. He was still alive on 28 May 1208 but died sometime between 1209 and 1210. His death is commemorated at Hereford Cathedral on 1 April.

== Writings ==
Map was a man of the world, with a large circle of courtly acquaintances, including Gerald of Wales. Robert R. Edwards writes that "Map had a contemporary reputation as a wit and story teller." His only surviving work, De Nugis Curialium (Trifles of Courtiers) is a collection of anecdotes and trivia, containing court gossip and a little real history, and written in a satirical vein. "In its form hardly more than the undigested reminiscences and notes of a man of the world with a lively sense of humour, ... it is, indeed, in some sense a keen satire on the condition of church and state in the writer's own day ... [and] of considerable interest; especially noticeable are his accounts of the Templars and Hospitallers, and his sketch of the English court and kings from the reign of William II to his own time."

Along with William of Newburgh, Map recorded the earliest stories of English vampires. The French-language Prose Lancelot cycle claims "Gautier Map" as an author, though this is contradicted by internal evidence; some scholars have suggested that he wrote a Lancelot romance, now lost, that was the source for the later cycle. Others say that, since Map's supposed patron was the King of England, it would have been more likely for him to have written an English tale about King Arthur, Gawain or some other “English” hero, rather than a French one. Map was also said to have written a quantity of Goliardic poetry, including the satirical Apocalypse of Golias.
