= Nightmarchers =

Mythical ghosts of Hawaiian warriors

In Hawaiian mythology, Nightmarchers (huakaʻi pō) or Spirit Ranks (ʻoiʻo) are the deadly ghosts of ancient tribal Hawaiian warriors. The nightmarchers are the vanguard for a sacred king, chief, or chiefess.

On the nights honoring the Hawaiian gods Kāne, Kū, Lono, or on the nights of Kanaloa, they are said to come forth from their burial sites or to rise up from the ocean, and to march in a large group to ancient Hawaiian battle sites or other sacred places. The legend says the night marchers are normal-size warriors, dressed for battle, carrying spears, clubs, and some are beating war drums and blowing tones from conch shells, to announce the advancing of their march. According to the myth, they are suspended in air; their feet do not touch water or ground as they traverse through the night, and they leave no evidence of their visitations.

They march in darkness after sunset and march as a group continuously until just before sunrise. Anyone living along their path may hear chanting, sounds of blown conch shell tones, and marching noises in the night. The following signs are a foul and musky “death-like” odor, and torches getting brighter and brighter as the night marchers get closer. Nightmarchers might appear during the day if they are to escort a dying relative to the spirit world.

Ancient Hawaiian beliefs state that any mortal looking upon or being seen in defiance toward the marchers will die violently. Barriers placed in the path of night marchers will not deter them. Some people maintain that if the mortal lies motionless, face down on the ground, they are showing proper respect, fear, and deference to the night marchers, and they will be spared. Additionally, mortals can avoid harm or death from night marchers by being fortunate to have an ancient ancestor marcher present to recognize them. As they encounter the mortal, they will call out "Naʻu!", which means "mine" in Hawaiian. No one in the warrior procession will harm them.

Legend says planting living ti (Cordyline sp.) shrubs around one's home is said to keep away all evil spirits and will cause the huakaʻi pō to avoid the area. The Nightmarchers are said to walk through houses with doors and backdoors placed in a straight line.

The ceremony and conduct of the march are customized to the tastes of its honored warrior leader. A Hawaiian King or Chief is known to be fond of music would be honored with much drumming and chanting. If the King or Chief enjoyed peace and quiet, the march would be as silent as possible. Further, if the King or Chief did not like to walk around much, he would be carried in a sling by warriors.

In ancient Hawaiian lore, the laws declared body parts of a King or Chief to be sacred, and not to be seen by a mortal. The punishment for looking at these parts is always instant death, usually by bolts of intense light and flaming heat originating from several of the warrior's eyes aimed toward the mortal. The violating mortal is incinerated instantly and the bodily remains dissipate as vapors.

If a King’s or Chief’s face was not supposed to be observed, the King or Chief would lead the assembled night marchers from the front. If his back was not to be looked upon, he would be in the back of the assembled group. However, for some Chiefs, no part of them was forbidden to look at by mortals. These Chiefs would march among their warriors in the group.

Some marches are joined by the Hawaiian gods. The torches are said to burn brighter in these marches. The largest torches are carried with one at the front, one in the back, and three within the group. The number five is significant in Hawaiian mythology. In the night marchers with Hawaiian gods present, there are six gods, three male, three female. The Goddess named Hiʻiaka-i-ka-poli-o-Pele, (commonly shortened to Hiʻiaka), is often within the night marchers. The composition of night marchers is extremely varied.

== In popular culture ==
In the 2005 Lilo & Stitch: The Series episode "Belle", Lilo Pelekai seeks to prove that Nightmarchers exist. Nightmarchers are also featured in the 2021 Netflix film Finding ʻOhana.
