= List of legendary creatures (K) =

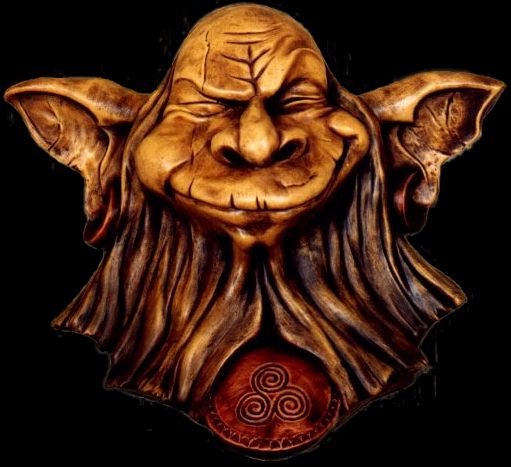
Depiction of a "Korrigan", small elf of the Celtic forests

1. Kabouter (Dutch) – Little people that live underground, in mushrooms, or as house spirits
2. Kachina (Hopi and Puebloan) – Nature spirit
3. Kahaku (Japanese) – Little people and water spirits
4. Kajsa (Scandinavian) – Wind spirit
5. Kalakeyas (Hindu) – Descendants of Kala
6. Kallikantzaroi (Greek) – Grotesque, malevolent spirit
7. Kamaitachi (Japanese) – Wind spirit
8. Kamatayan (Philippine) – Philippine counterpart of Death
9. Kami (Japanese) – Nature spirit
10. Kamikiri (Japanese) – Hair-cutting spirit
11. Kanbari-nyūdō (Japanese) – Bathroom spirit
12. Kangla Sha (Meitei mythology) – Dragon Lion in the Kangla Palace
13. Kanbo (Japanese) – Drought spirit
14. Kanedama (Japanese) – Money spirit
15. Kappa (Japanese) – Little people and water spirit
16. Kapre (Philippine) – Malevolent tree spirit
17. Karakoncolos (Bulgarian and Turkish), also in Bosnia and Herzegovina and Serbia known as Karanđoloz – Troublesome spirit
18. Karakura (Turkish) – Male night-demon
19. Karasu-tengu (Japanese) – Tengu with a bird's bill
20. Karkadann (Persian) – One-horned giant animal
21. Karkinos (Greek) – Giant crab
22. Karura (Japanese) – Eagle-human hybrid
23. Karzełek (Polish) – Little people and mine spirits
24. Kasa-obake (Japanese) – Animated parasol
25. Kasha (Japanese) – Cat-like demon which descends from the sky and carries away corpses
26. Kashanbo (Japanese) – Kappa who climb into the mountains for the winter
27. Katawa-guruma (Japanese) – Woman riding on a flaming wheel
28. Katsura-otoko (Japanese) – Handsome man from the Moon
29. Katallan (Albanian) – Man-eating giant
30. Kaukas (Lithuanian) – Nature spirit
31. Kawa-uso (Japanese) – Supernatural river otter
32. Kawa-zaru (Japanese) – Smelly, cowardly water spirit
33. Kayeri (Cuiva) - Mushroom-like monster
34. Ke'lets (Chukchi) – Ogre or evil spirit
35. Keelut (Inuit) – Hairless dog
36. Kee-wakw (Abenaki) – Half-human half-animal cannibalistic giant
37. Keibu Keioiba (Meitei) – Man with the body of a human but the head of a tiger
38. Kekkai (Japanese) – Amorphous afterbirth spirit
39. Kelpie (Irish and Scottish) – Malevolent water horse
40. Ker (Greek) – Female death spirit
41. Kesaran-pasaran (Japanese) – Mysterious, white, fluffy creature
42. Keukegen (Japanese) – Disease spirit
43. Keythong (Heraldic) – Wingless griffin
44. Khalkotauroi (Greek) – Bronze-hoofed bulls
45. Khyah (Nepalese) – Fat, hairy ape-like creature
46. Kigatilik (Inuit) – Night-demon
47. Kholomodumo (Sotho) – Gluttonous monster that was one of the first beasts of creation
48. Kijimuna (Ryukyuan) – Tree sprite from Okinawa
49. Kijo (Japanese) – She-devil
50. Kikimora (Slavic) – Female house spirit
51. Killmoulis (English and Scottish) – Ugly, mischievous mill spirit
52. Kinnara (Hindu) – Human-bird hybrid
53. Kin-u (Japanese) – Bird
54. Kirin (Japanese) – Japanese Unicorn
55. Kishi (Angola) – Malevolent, two-faced seducer
56. Kitsune (Japanese) – Fox spirit
57. Kitsune-Tsuki (Japanese) – Person possessed by a fox spirit
58. Kiyohime (Japanese) – Woman who transformed into a serpentine demon out of the rage of unrequited love
59. Klabautermann (German) – Ship spirit
60. Knocker (folklore) (Cornish and Welsh) – Little people and mine spirits
61. Knucker (English) – Water dragon
62. Kobalos (Greek) – Goblin like thieves and tricksters
63. Kobold (German) – Little people and mine or house spirits
64. Kodama (Japanese) – Tree spirit
65. Kofewalt (Germanic) – House spirit
66. Ko-gok (Abenaki) – Hideous monster
67. Kokakuchō (Japanese) – Ubume bird
68. Komainu (Japanese) – Protective animal
69. Konaki-jiji (Japanese) – Infant that cries until it is picked up, then increases its weight and crushes its victim
70. Konoha-tengu (Japanese) – Bird-like creature
71. Konrul (Turkic) – Bird that is reborn
72. Koro-pok-guru (Ainu) – Little people
73. Korrigan (Breton) – Little people and nature spirits
74. Koshchei (Russian) – Villainous figure that is unkillable, usually by hiding "his death" inside objects to protect it
75. Koto-furunushi (Japanese) – Animated koto
76. Kraken (Scandinavian) – Sea monster
77. Krasnoludek (Slavic) – Little people nature spirits
78. Krasue (Southeast Asian) – Vampiric, floating head
79. Krampus (Germany) – Christmas Devil who punishes badly-behaved children
80. Kratt
81. Kting Voar (Southeast Asian) – Snake eating cattle
82. Kuarahy Jára (Guaraní) – Forest spirit
83. Kubikajiri (Japanese) – Female corpse-chewing graveyard spirit
84. Kuchisake-onna (Japanese) – Vengeful ghost of a woman mutilated by her husband
85. Kuda-gitsune (Japanese) – Miniature fox spirit
86. Kudan (Japanese) – Human-faced calf which predicts a calamity before dying
87. Kui (Chinese) – One-legged monster
88. Kujata (Arabian) – Cosmic bull
89. Kukudhi (Albanian) – Female demon who spreads sickness
90. Kukwes (Mi'kmaq) – Large, hairy, greedy, human-eating bipedal monsters whose scream can kill
91. Kulshedra (Albanian) – Drought-causing dragon
92. Kumakatok (Philippine) – Death spirits
93. Kumiho (Korean) – Fox spirit
94. Kun (Chinese) – Giant fish
95. Kupua (Hawaiian) – Shapeshifting tricksters
96. Kurabokko (Japanese) – Guardian spirit of a warehouse
97. Kurage-no-hinotama (Japanese) – Jellyfish which floats through the air as a fireball
98. Kurma (Hindu mythology) – Second avatar of Vishnu in the form of a Turtle
99. Kurupi (Guaraní) – Wild man and fertility spirit
100. Kushtaka (Tlingit) – Shapeshifting "land otter man"
101. Kye-ryong (Korean) – Chicken-lizard hybrid
102. Kyourinrin (Japanese) – Animated scroll or paper
103. Kyūbi-no-kitsune (Japanese) – Nine-tailed fox
104. Kyūketsuki (Japanese) – Vampire king
