= Dando's dogs =

Mythical creature in English folklore

Dando's Dogs also known as the Devil's Dandy Dogs, are mythical creatures in English folklore, originating in Cornwall. They are hounds that take part in the Wild Hunt. They are associated with Black Dogs, a generic term for canine apparitions.

The legend involves a sinful priest named Dando, who was a capable huntsman. After a Sunday hunt, Dando drinks all the alcohol that his companions give him. Dando calls for more. He exclaims that if the drink he wants cannot be found on Earth, they should go to Hell to get it. A strange huntsman comes forward and offers Dando a drink, but seizes some of Dando's game from the hunt. A drunken Dando tries to stop the huntsman, shouting, "I'll go to Hell after them, but I'll get them from thee."

In another version, a strange huntsman offers Dando a flask. Dando drinks it, but wants more and says that "I'll gallop to Hell for more".

In both versions, the huntsman whisks Dando away to Hell, while Dando's dogs give futile chase. It is said that on early Sunday mornings, "Dando's Dogs" can be heard, either pursuing game or searching for Dando.
