= Uzuh =

Uzuh (also known as Uzuğ or Uğuz) is a mythical race of giants in Turkish folklore.

== Mytholohu ==
An Uzuh is a hairy, human-like giant that is as tall as a house or tree. An Uzuh is very strong, able to uproot trees and carry heavy loads; its chest so large that it can generate storms simply by blowing. When an Uzuh speaks or sings, it can be heard far away. They live in tribes deep in the forests in towns. There are good and bad Uzuh tribes.

The bad Uzuh stay in the forest away from people. They are also called the "Forest Uzuh". They normally do not harm people, but if a bad Uzuh encounters a young man in a forest, it will take him home and enslave him for some time. The man is often maltreated by his Uzuh master, and when is eventually set free, often emerges emaciated.

The good Uzuh visits people and helps them with their everyday work or troubles. Each household has its own devoted Uzuh. The good Uzuh will often inflict harm on rival households and their Uzuh.

== Sources ==
- Türk Mitolojisi Ansiklopedik Sözlük, Celal Beydili, Yurt Yayınevi
