= Augenbrand =

Mythical black dog

In the legends of the Canton of Jura, Switzerland, Augenbrand is a black dog with fire eyes that prowls near the old Soyhières bridge over the Birs (now destroyed), where he searches for his master, Count Rodolphe de Sogren, who was murdered in 1233. He is reputed to pursue wayward travelers.

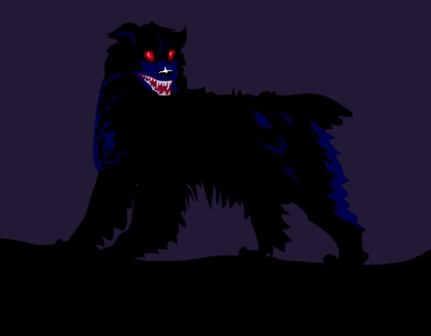
Black dog with red eyes, close to Augenbrand's description

== Etymology and terminology ==
This dog's fiery eyes earned him the name Augenbrand: their glow is unmistakable.

Rodolphe de Sogren was Count of the Château de Soyhières (Soyhières was formerly called Saugern in German, a name close to Sogren).

== Mentions ==
In 1855, Augenbrand was mentioned in the Canton of Jura legends:

[...] dwarves or fairies had been heard mowing loudly on summer nights in the Lady's meadow, under the forest at Donzel, at the very foot of the castle. Many had seen the fiery-eyed black dog, Augenbrand, searching for his master, Count Rodolphe de Sogren, murdered in 1233.

— Société jurassienne d'émulation

The same dog is also mentioned in the Swiss Archives of Folk Traditions (Schweizerische Gesellschaft für Volkskunde in German).

It is also said that many people had seen a black dog with fiery eyes, named Augenbrand, searching for his master Count Rudolf of Sorgen, who was murdered in 1233.

— Archives suisses des traditions populaires:

== See also ==
- Black dog (folklore)
- Barghest
- Canton of Jura

== Bibliography ==
- Société jurassienne d'émulation, Porrentruy, V. Michel, February 1855
- Archives suisses des traditions populaires, vol. XXV, Schweizerische Gesellschaft für Volkskunde, 1925
