= Murder of Ruth Osborne =

1751 unofficial witch trial and murder of English woman

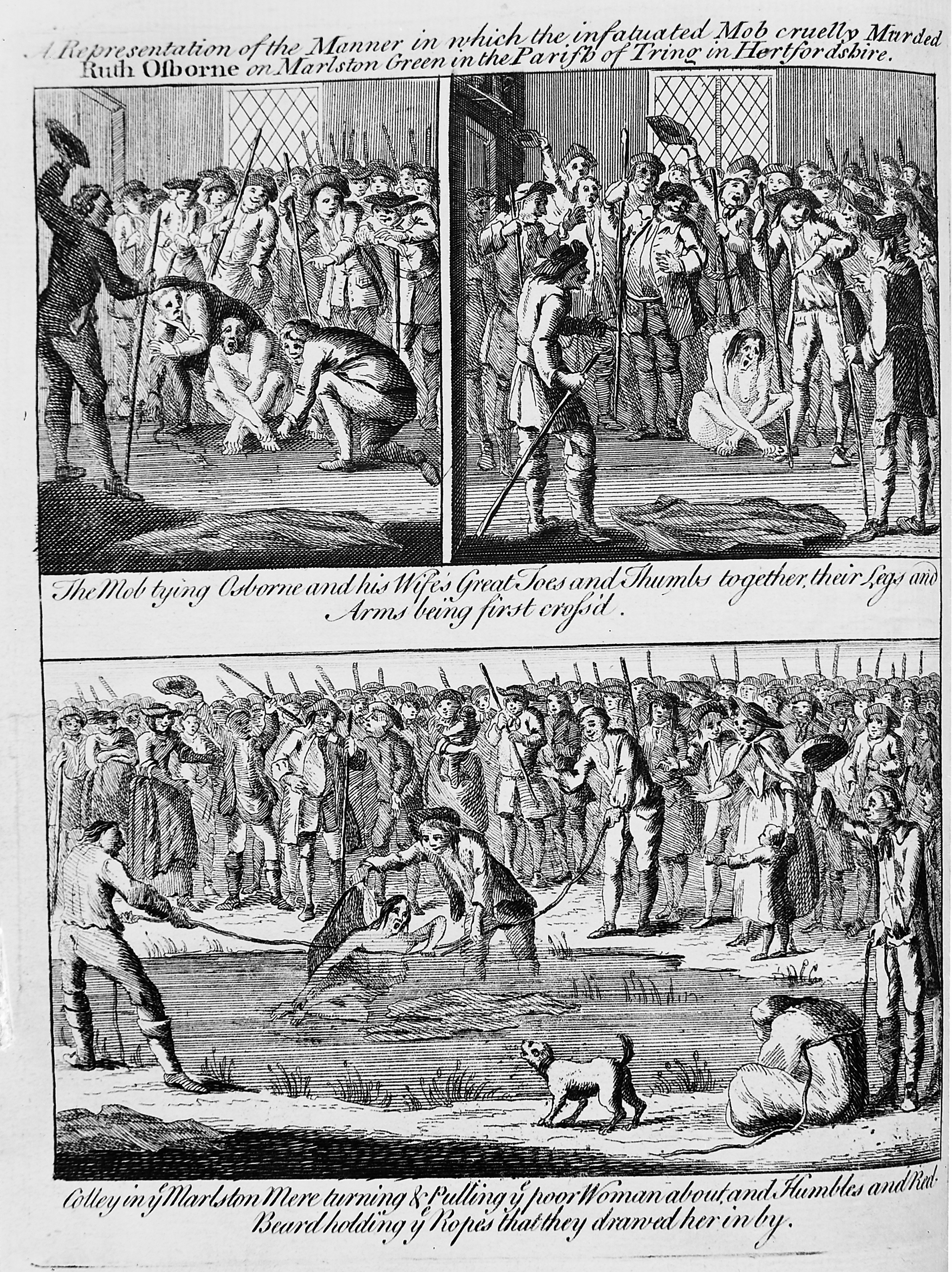
- The frontispiece of The Remarkable Confession and Last Dying Words of Thomas Colley (1751), depicting Osborne's murder
- Location: Long Marston, Hertfordshire, England
- Date: 22 April 1751
- Victims: Ruth and George Osborne
- Motive: Accusations of witchcraft
- Verdict: Guilty
- Convictions: Murder

On 22 April 1751, Ruth Osborne (née Haggenson), a 69-year-old English woman who was accused of being a witch, was drowned in a pond in Long Marston, Hertfordshire when she was subject to an unofficial witch swimming alongside her husband, the 56-year-old labourer John Osborne, who survived. The murder made her the last alleged witch to be killed in England.

The Osbornes, living in Gubblecote near Tring, were on poor relief. Ruth Osborne had in 1745 asked farmer John Butterfield for buttermilk; Butterfield refused and later blamed the death of his calves and his own fits on alleged witchcraft by Ruth Osborne and her husband. These accusations were repeated about the local area, and from 14 April 1751 town criers were paid in Hemel Hempstead, Winslow and Leighton Buzzard, to summon a crowd to Tring for 22 April to have the couple swum as accused witches. Initially being protected at Tring's workhouse, the Osbornes were quietly moved to the vestry of Tring church (Note: It is unclear which church in the area the couple hid within, as testimony only refers to 'Tring church'.) in the morning of 22 April.

A crowd of thousands gathered outside the workhouse that day; they rioted, bringing down part of the workhouse before forcing its master John Tomkins to take them to the Osbornes in the church. The pair were found and were stripped before being taken to the village pond at Long Marston. They were tied up, brought out into the middle of the pond, and put into the water, with chimney sweep Thomas Colley playing a significant role in holding Ruth Osborne underwater. Though it was determined that she had floated, she died minutes after being brought back to the bank of the body of water. John Osborne survived.

Though the crowd surrounding the murder numbered in the thousands and the incident was carried out by several ringleaders, only Colley was tried for Ruth Osborne's murder. At the Hertfordshire assizes that began on 29 July 1751, Colley was sentenced to death for the murder. Following a procession from Hertford County Gaol, he was hanged and then gibbeted at Gubblecote Cross on 24 August 1751. 19th-century folklore purported that the gibbet was haunted by a phantom black dog.

== Background ==
Belief in witchcraft in England was in decline before the 18th century, though this decline continued through the 19th century. The final English official executions for witchcraft occurred in 1684, with the last indictment for the act taking place in 1717. However, killings still occurred due to suspected witchcraft such as in St Albans in 1700 and in Frome in 1731. The Witchcraft Act was repealed in 1736, some fifteen years prior to Ruth Osborne's murder. Witch swimming, a popular form of trial in which a person would be thrown into the water and then judged guilty of witchcraft if they floated or innocent if they sank, was one practice which continued after the 1736 repeal.

=== Witchcraft rumours against the Osbornes ===
Osborne was born in 1682. There is little that is known about her early life. By 1751, she lived in the small settlement known as Gubblecote near Tring, Hertfordshire with her husband John Osborne, a labourer born 1695. Over the course of several years, rumours spread among the local community that the pair were Jacobites, or witches, and particularly that she had bewitched her brother from a neighbouring parish, Haggenson. These rumours impacted their ability to find work and as such they used poor relief.

Ruth Osborne asked for buttermilk at the farm of John Butterfield in 1745, though Butterfield refused this and told her to leave, stating that "he had not enough for his hogs". She responded negatively, stating that "the pretender would have him and his hogs too". Later, Butterfield blamed the deaths of some of his calves on Osborne bewitching them; he would later be forced to stop farming altogether, instead taking up the operation of an alehouse at Gubblecote Cross named the Black Horse from 1751. He suffered from repeated fits and continued to blame these on Osborne; use of a cunning woman was recommended to him by several of his customers including a Thomas Colley. Upon his questioning of such a woman from Northamptonshire, famous for curing disease, she confirmed to Butterfield that he was under a spell from "two of his neighbours, a man and a woman"; he believed these were the Osbornes. The cunning woman attempted to heal Butterfield to no effect. The Gentleman's Magazine later reported that she "ordered 6 men to watch [Butterfield's] house day and night with staves and pitchforks, and other weapons, at the same time having something about their necks, which, she said, was a charm that would protect them from being bewitched themselves". Following this, the idea was tabled that the Osbornes should be tried at a witch swimming. At the time of the murder, Ruth Osborne was aged 69 and John Osborne was 56.

=== Preparations ===
Daniel Nichols, a man from Long Marston, was paid by an unknown individual to bring a text to the town crier of Hemel Hempstead, William Dell, who was paid a fourpence to cry it on 14 April which was market day at Hemel. It was also cried at Winslow and Leighton Buzzard, likely on the next Wednesday and Saturday. These towns are between three and five hours' walk from the Tring area.

This is to give notice that on Munay next there is to be at Long Marston in the parish of Tring two hill [sic] disposed persons to be ducked by the neighbours consent.

This announced that on Monday 22 April, a man and woman were to be "publickly duck'd at Tring".

As such, the Osbornes began to be subject to increasing hostility, and so requested of Tring's overseer of the poor Matthew Barton, whom they knew, that they be brought into the local workhouse for safety. He did so on 20 April. Crowds gathered around the workhouse by 21 April; its master John Tomkins anticipated violence, and so had Barton take them to the vestry of a Tring church in the early morning of 22 April.

=== Workhouse riot and apprehension of John and Ruth Osborne ===
Back at the workhouse, its master John Tomkins would later testify that;

the mob [...] broke the workhouse windows, pulled down the pales, and demolished part of the house; and seizing the governor, threatened to drown him and fire the town, having straw in their hands for that purpose.

This crowd consisted of an estimate of several thousand people. Tomkins alleged that every window of the workhouse was smashed, and that they took down a whole end of the workhouse, before threatening to kill him and burn the workhouse down. This forced Tomkins to take them to the church where the Osbornes were being held. By this point, the crowd numbered around 4,000 people, opposed only by Sebastian Grace who was a blacksmith and constable of Tring.

The crowd stormed the church and apprehended the Osbornes there, before escorting them to a location for the swimming. The landlord of the local Half Moon pub, Bolos Molongs, stated that Ruth Osborne was taken to his house for around 45 minutes from around 3 pm. They stripped the pair of their clothes, partially stripping Ruth Osborne. They then dragged the pair two miles, taking them to the village pond at Long Marston near Gubblecote, known as Wilston Wear.

== Murder ==
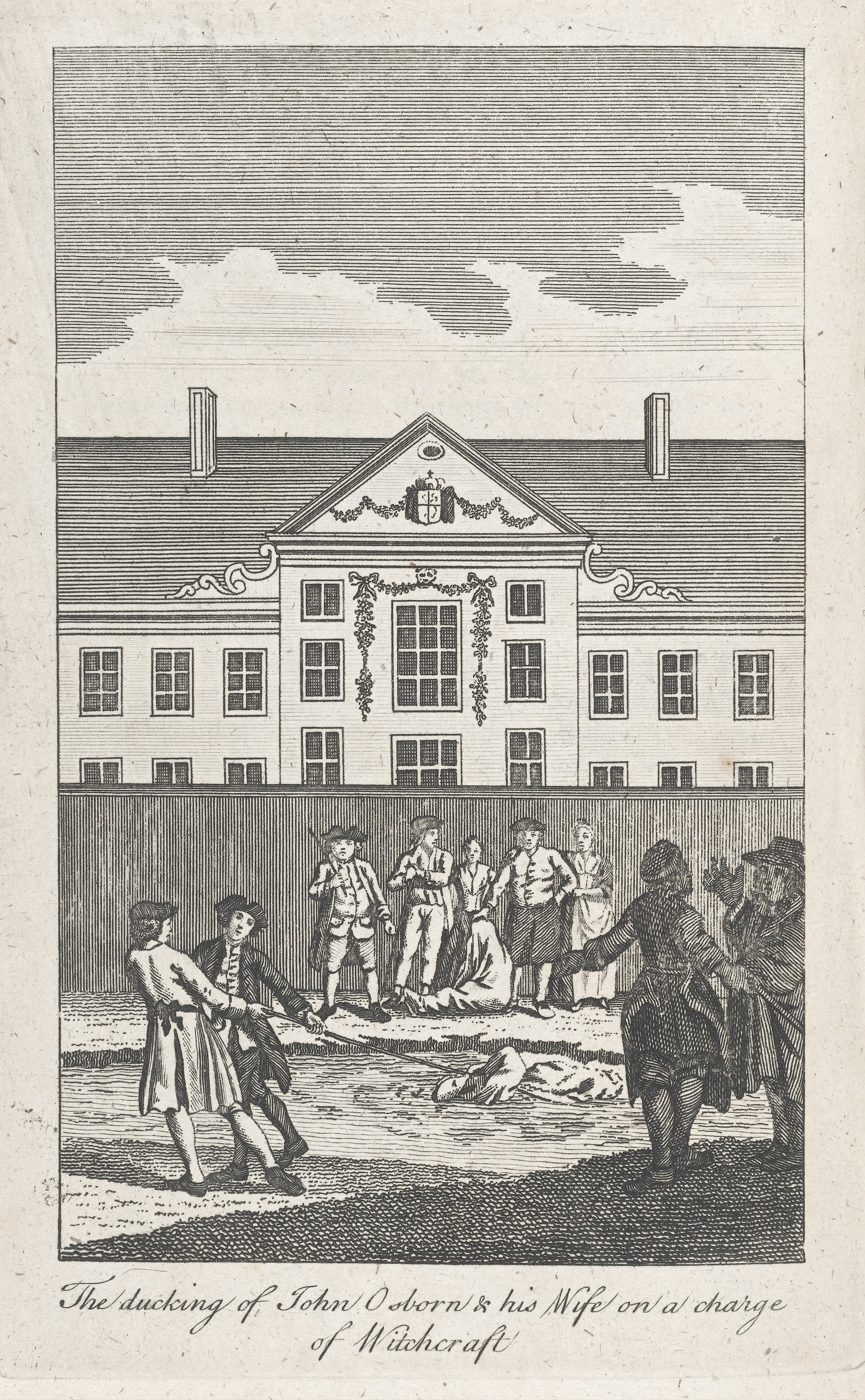
A 1795 depiction of the ducking of John and Ruth Osborne

At the pond, they tied Ruth Osborne's thumbs to her toes, covered her in a sheet, put a rope under her armpits, and threw her into the water. They then drew her across the pond using the rope. After this, one individual carried her to the middle of the body of water and was laid there until it was expected that she had drowned, and then she was taken back to the bank.

While Ruth Osborne was on the bank, John Osborne underwent a similar ordeal. Though it was later incorrectly published in The Gentleman's Magazine that he had died, he in fact survived.

Following a gap of half an hour, someone carried her back into the water; she was "turned about" by Thomas Colley. Tring farmer John Holmes later testified and was corroborated in stating that Colley was "turning and prodding her with a stick and at one time she managed to get her head above water, she cried and grabbed the stick, but he wrenched it from her and left her lying in the water." Colley used the stick to push her under the water multiple times before confirming that she had floated. Ruth Osborne was then dragged onto the bank of the body of water. Having "been suffocated with Water and Mud" from the ordeal, she died minutes later. Colley addressed the crowd to request money in exchange for providing them the entertainment.

== Aftermath ==
Molongs later stated that about an hour after the Osbornes had left the Half Moon alive, Ruth Osborne's body was returned to his house and her body placed in a bed there. Colley was arrested soon following the drowning, and was found to be drunk, later confessing to this. He was taken to Tring, and then to Hertford's County Gaol. Aside from Colley, other rioters went to Buckinghamshire to escape, as the constables would be unable to pursue them there. Only a few were ever trialled.

=== Coroner's inquest ===
John Osborne gave evidence to a coroner's inquest into the incident at Tring on 21 May; it was written that "he knew only two persons who were concerned with the riot and ducking them, who were Thomas Colley who is since committed to Hertford jail and Francis Hopton of Ivinghoe [...] who seized them in the vestry in order to be ducked." Though The Gentleman's Magazine falsely reported that a coroner's inquest had indicted several individuals for Ruth Osborne's murder, only Thomas Colley was indicted in the coroner's inquest. It was noted, however, that other ringleaders were known.

On 25 April, another inquest was held at the Half Moon by the Hertfordshire coroner serving King George II, Samuel Atkinson. He looked over Ruth Osborne's body there. A surgeon, John Foster, examined her body; he found that she had no wounds aside from a graze on one of her breasts, contradicting other evidence of beatings against her while she was in the water. He said that the cause of death was "being suffocated with water and mud and suffering to be on the cold ground for a considerable time". Atkinson also heard sworn statements from 25 men from nearby parishes.

Three justices of the peace – Rowland Johnson, Reverend Sir Gilbert Williams, and George Carpenter Esquire – instructed the High Sheriff to summon a jury.

=== Trial ===
On 31 July 1751, at the Hertfordshire assizes in Hertford, which had begun on 29 July, Colley was tried for murder. Lord Justice Thomas Lee and a grand jury led by foreman Fagin Slale found against Colley. Colley testified that the money he collected was instead "for the great pains I had taken at the Pond to save both the Woman and the Man". He had an interest in witchcraft, and said he had been inspired by a public ducking of two women that had occurred sixteen or seventeen years prior in Bedfordshire, in which one woman drowned and the other "swam like a Cork"; he said that they had "murdered the supposed Witch; and no Harm coming upon it, he thought he might lawfully serve [the Osbornes] in the same Manner." Historian Owen Davies has put forward that Colley and the other ringleaders had thought swimming witches was a lawful procedure, as they would not have advertised it otherwise.

The jury found Colley guilty of murder without leaving the courtroom to discuss the verdict. Condemned to death and gibbeting, he would wait nearly a month for his execution, an abnormally long time for this sentence. Justice Johnson wrote of his support for the gibbeting sentence:

Common People knowing little or nothing of History, and the Records of Times past, are strongly instigated to commit Disorders of this kind, unless restrained by Examples of punishment inflicted on such [?] within their own memorys on such offenders, which serve as Marks to deter them from attempting violence of such fatal consequence, and to prevent their splitting on the same Rack.

Daniel Nicholls who had paid the crier, and William Dell who was the Hempstead crier himself, were indicted. Nicholls was seen as an innocent servant to the crime, while Dell appeared unaware of the effect of the words he had cried at the time. As such, they were acquitted. Five others were indicted for "pulling down the workhouse". Two other men aside from Colley were indicted for murder; William Umbles and Charles Young (also known as Edward Leigh or Redbeard). The fates of these men are unknown. John Butterfield was never indicted, and does not appear in records after this.

== Execution and gibbeting of Thomas Colley ==
On 23 August, the day prior to his execution, Colley was given the sacrament. He also signed a solemn declaration of his faith in relation to witchcraft. He was then taken thirty miles from Hertford to his place of execution. This was a slow procession consisting of a guard of 108 men, seven officers and two trumpeters. It generally followed the route of what are now the A414 and A41 roads. On the way, Colley lodged at a gaol in St Albans. At 5 am the next day, he was put into a chaise pulled by a single horse, next to his executioner. They passed through Hemel Hempstead. The route and number of troops was by Brian P. Block's assessment an intentional warning from the authorities to the locals against murdering suspected witches. The procession entered Tring, where Colley was allowed to speak with his wife and daughter. Here, it was reported that one of the troops escorting Colley accidentally fired his pistol. When passing Butterfield's pub, Colley accused the landlord of inciting the people.

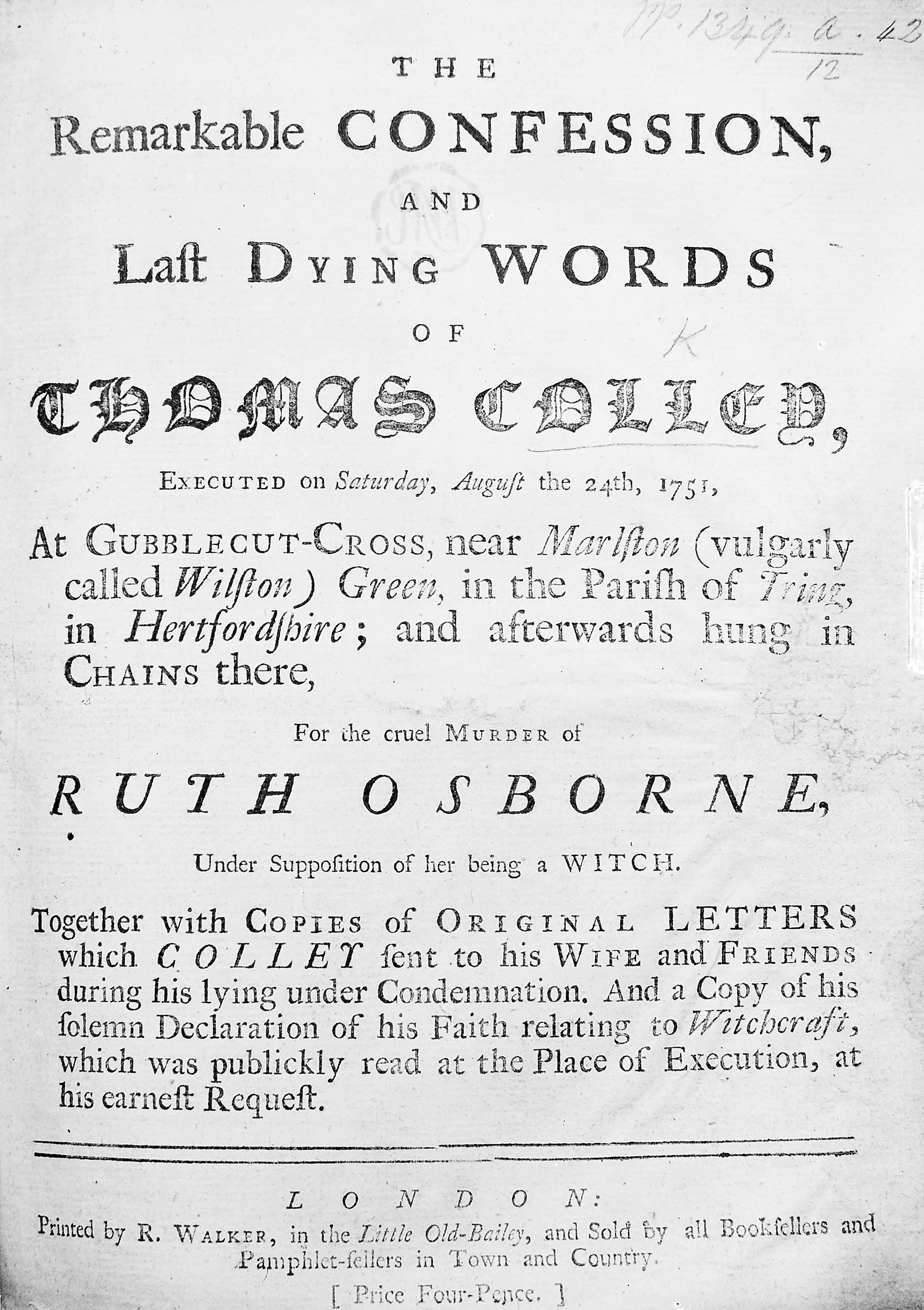
The title page of The Remarkable Confession and Last Dying Words of Thomas Colley (1751)

They arrived at his place of execution, Gubblecote Cross, a crossroads nearby the murder site, at 11 am on Friday 24 August 1751. An estimated 5,000 people came to view the execution; The Gentleman's Magazine reported that "The infatuation of the greatest part of the country people was so great they would not be spectators at his death (perhaps from a consciousness of being present at the murder as well as he); yet many thousands stood at a distance to see him go, grumbling and muttering". Colley's alleged last words, very likely not to have been written by him, were read by the minister on his behalf:

Good people! I beseech you all to take warning by an unhappy man's suffering; that you be not deluded into so absurd and wicked a conceit, as to believe that there are any such things upon earth as witches. It was that foolish and vain imagination, heighten'd and inflamed by the strength of liquor, which prompted me to be instrumental (with others as mad-brained as myself) in the horrid and barbarous murder of Ruth Osborne, the supposed witch, for which I am so deservedly to suffer death. I am fully convinced of my former error, and with the sincerity of a dying man declare that I do not believe that there is such a thing in being as a witch; and pray God that none of you, thro' a contrary persuasion, may hereafter be induced to think, that you have a right in any shape to persecute, much less endanger the life of a fellow creature. I beg of you all to pray to God to forgive me, and to wash clean my polluted soul in the blood of Jesus Christ, my saviour and redeemer, so exhorteth you all, the dying Thomas Colley.

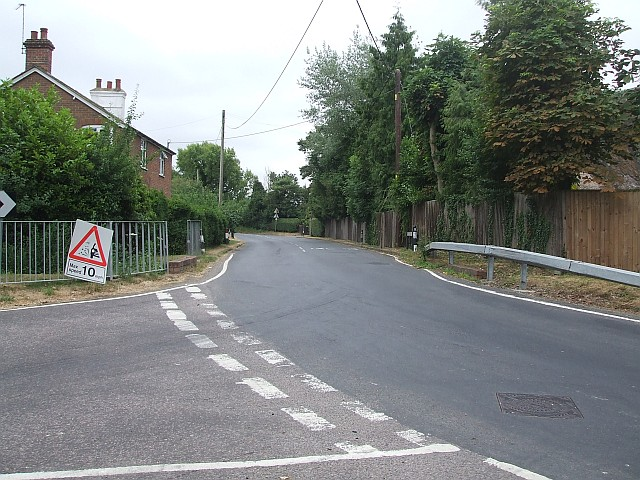
Gubblecote Cross, the site of Colley's execution and gibbeting, in 2010

Then, Colley was hanged. He was then gibbeted in the same location; local residents had been able to petition that the gibbet not be erected at the murder scene. Colley's gibbet cage came to a cost of £5 exactly, with the total cost of execution at £26 7s 5d.

=== Black dog of Tring ===
Colley's gibbet became known in local folklore as a locus for the alleged haunting of a phantom black dog; in the 19th century a schoolmaster stated that he had seen such a dog when coming back in his gig one night. He wrote; "when we came near the spot, where a portion of the gibbet had lately stood, we saw on the bank of the roadside [...] a flame of fire as large as a man’s hat [...] I then saw an immense black dog lying on the road just in front of our horse [...] The dog was the strangest looking creature I ever beheld." He said it was "as big as a Newfoundland, but very gaunt, shaggy, with long ears and tail, eyes like balls of fire, and large, long teeth, for he seemed to grin at us". He further noted that it "looked more like a fiend than a dog".

=== Present murder site ===
The exact site of Ruth Osborne's murder in Long Marston is no longer known, as the pond in which she was drowned dried up and dissipated long ago. Papers relating to the murder were as of 2003 kept in the Rare Documents section at Stanford University.

== Sources ==
- Block, Brian P. (8 March 2003). "The Witch, the Innkeeper and the Chimney Sweep". Justice of the Peace. 167 (10): 171–174 – via HeinOnline.
- Stratford, Elaine (30 September 2025). "Shamed: Swimming Witches". The Drowned: Elements of Loss and Repair. Palgrave Series in Elemental Thinking. Singapore: Springer Nature. pp. 91–131. doi:10.1007/978-981-96-8857-9. ISBN 978-981-96-8856-2.
- Tarlow, Sarah (1 December 2014). "The Technology of the Gibbet". International Journal of Historical Archaeology. 18 (4). doi:10.1007/s10761-014-0275-0. ISSN 1092-7697. PMC 4372825. PMID 25834380.
