= Kallikantzaros =

Malevolent goblin in Southeastern European and Anatolian folklore

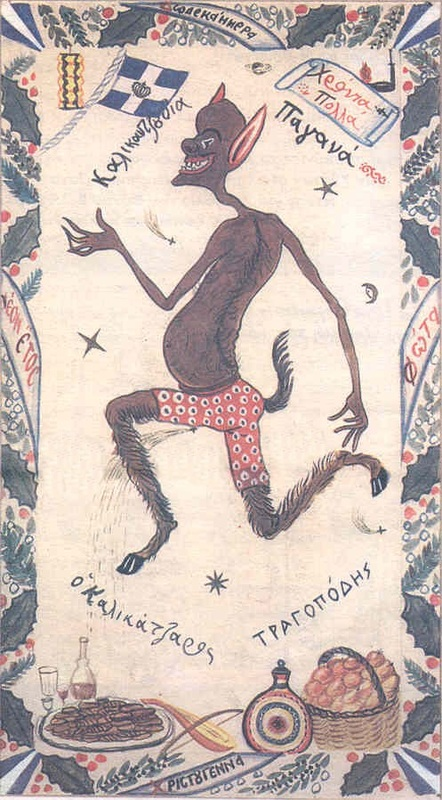
- Kallikantzaros with goat legs (Note: Inscription states explicitly "τράγοποδης [goat-legged]". Above it reads χρόνια πολλά which is a holiday greeting.) urinating on the Christmas pastries on a tray. —Greek primer illustration

Creature information
- Other name(s): karakoncolos, karakondžula, karakondzhol
- Grouping: Folklore
- Sub grouping: Goblin

Origin
- Country: Greece, Bulgaria, North Macedonia, Serbia, Turkey, Cyprus, Bosnia and Herzegovina, Albania
- Region: Southeastern Europe
- Details: Shape-shifting

The kallikantzaros (Greek: καλικάντζαρος, romanized: kalikántzaros) is a malevolent creature in modern Greek folklore.

Kallikantzaroi are believed to dwell underground spending most of the time trying to saw down the giant tree that supports the earth, but come to the surface during the twelve days of Christmas, from 25 December to 6 January (to Theophany/Epiphany).

Its equivalents occur in Bulgarian (karakondžul, караконджул), Serbian (karakondžula, караконџула)), Bosnian, Albanian (karkanxholl), Cypriot, and Turkish folklore (karakoncolos).

== Nomenclature ==
=== Forms ===
Alternate spellings in Greek include kalikántzaros καλικάντζαρος, kalikántzaros καληκάντζαρος, kallikantzaros καλλικάντζαρος.

Locally skalikántzaros σκαλικάντζαρoc on Zakynthos island, kalkántaros καλκάντζαρος on Lesbos, kalikáttaros καλικάτταρος in Cyprus, (Note: Also καλκάτταροc, κολικάνтсарос, citing Ἐφ. τῶν Φιλομ. α. a. Ο..) kalikántaros, skalikántzaros καλικάνζαρος, σκαλικάντζαροc on Cythera, (Note: Also kalitsággaros καλιτσάγγαρος in Pyrgos on Tinos, citing Ἐφ. τῶν Φιλομ. 1861, p. 1859.) and other forms as well. (Note: In Arachoba forms with "e" in the penultimate vowel position ("-epos") is common: σκαλ(ι)κάντσερος, καλ(ι)κάντσερος, diminutive cκαλ(ι)καντσέρι.)

=== Etymology ===
Kallikantzaroi can be seen as "faithful reproductions of the satyrs and sileni that attended Dionysos". The Greek term kallikantzaros can be broken down into kalos καλός "good, beautiful" and kántzaros κάντζαρος, possibly derived from kéntauros κένταυρος "centaur", but this "beautiful centaur" speculation has been met with many objections.

Adamantios Koraïs proposed that kántzaros derives from kántharos κάνθαρος "scarab beetle". Franz Boll (1909) backed the kantharos derivation, noting that the "holy kantharos" had entered mystical literature as the name of a demon or god, so that it has been invoked in a magic papyrus as "the lord of all". (Note: ὁ τῶν ὅλων δεσπότης, citing Wessely, Charles ed. (1893) Neue griechische Zauberpapyri, Wien, p. 37, v. 527.) It has been noted that kantharos can also mean a type of vase used strictly in Dionysian festivities, and that the Rhodian subtype of kallikantzaros is in fact called "kantharos".

As Elderkin explains, the "beetle-cup" kantharos was—like the Egyptian scarab or beetle itself—"very probably a mystic symbol of resurrection and immortality". Even Saint Ambrose of Milan has referred to Christ as "beetle on the cross" (scarabaeus in cruce). Kantharos and Kanthara were mystical names for Dionysos and his consort Persephone. "Good kantharoi" would then be a euphemism for the two gods.

John Cuthbert Lawson (1910) rejected the kantharos theory and favored the centaur explanation. Ginzburg (2004) also belittles Koraïs' and Boll's hypothesis as a "cockroach" theory, though that is not the correct insect.

Bernhard Schmidt (1871) opted that the word defies explanation in Greek. (Note: Schmidt (1871), p. 143, also note 1.) The form karkántsalos καρκάντσαλος attested among the Greek population of Stenimachos (Asenovgrad, Bulgaria) and glossed as "mischievous demon", (Note: Explained as Greek: ἀλιτήριος δαίμων, citing Ἐφημ. τῶν Φιλομ. 1861, p. 1555. Pandor. XI, φ. 260, p. 473.) suggests the Albanian term karkantšolji, (Note: Schmidt transliterates as Albanian: каркандс◌̈ о´л-ι but substitutes Cyrillic letters with Greek.) meaning "gypsy ghost", borrowed from Turkish kara-kondjolos ("werewolf, vampire", from kara "black" and koncolos "bloodsucker, werewolf"). The Turkish-Albanian origin was endorsed by Albanologists such as Maximilian Lambertz (1973).

== Greek folklore ==
It is believed that kallikantzaroi stay underground, sawing the trunk of the tree that holds the Earth, so that it will collapse, along with the Earth. However, according to folklore, when the final part of the trunk is about to be sawed, Christmas dawns and kallikantzaroi are able to come to the surface. They forget the tree and come to bring trouble to mortals, by playing pranks. They come down the chimney, urinate on the fireplace, befoul the food, water, or wine, spoil the milk, break furniture, devour the Christmas pork, and terrorize people.

Finally, on the Epiphany (6 January), the sun starts moving again, and they must return underground to continue their sawing. They see that during their absence the world tree has healed itself, so they must start working all over again. This is believed to occur annually.

=== Appearance ===
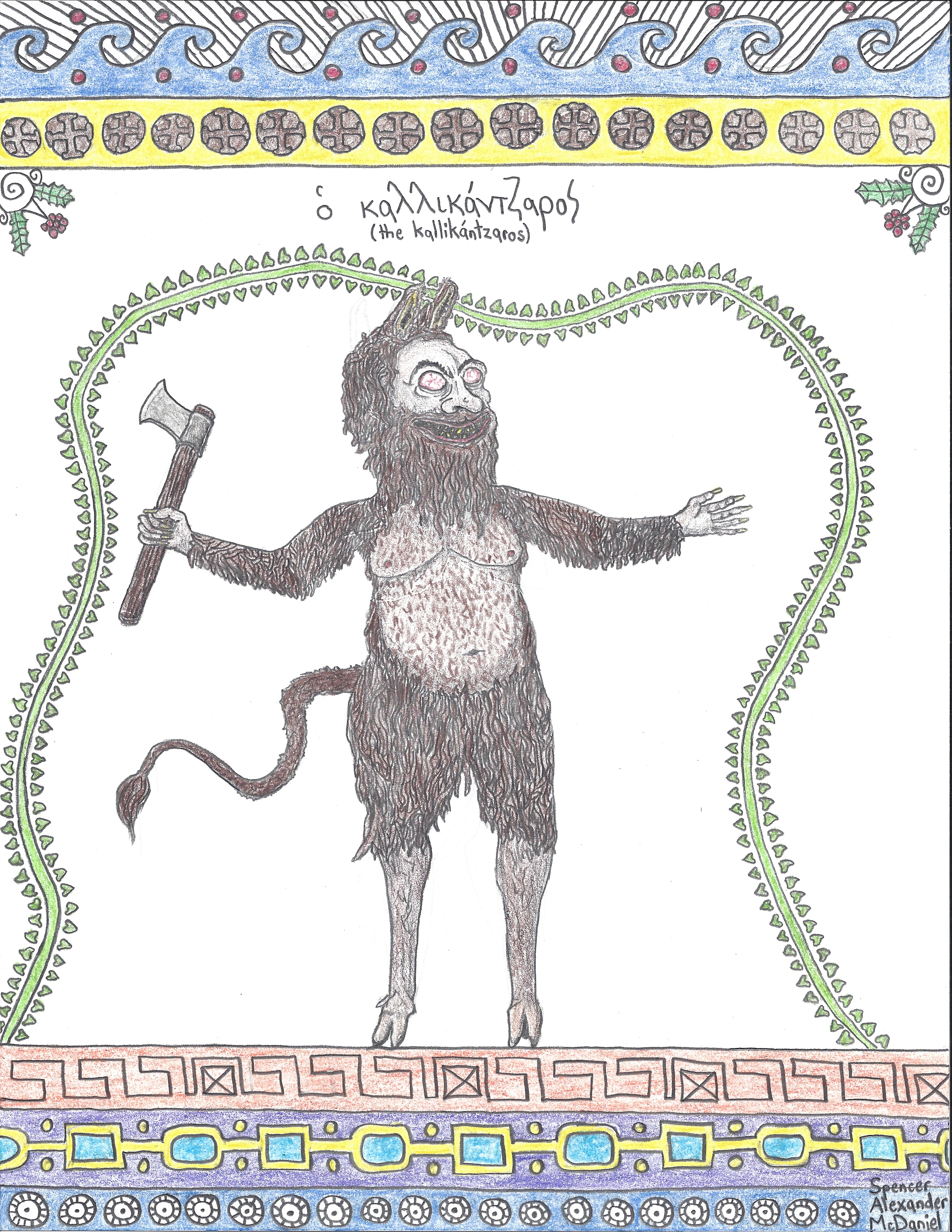
Pencil illustration from 2020 depicting a hairy kallikantzaros with goat legs, donkey ears, burning red eyes, and a long tail

There is no standard description of the appearance of kallikantzaroi; there are regional variations as to how their appearance is described (cf. § Lore below). Sometimes they are said to be enormous, and sometimes diminutive. (Note: German: "zwergen- oder riesenhaft".) They may be black and hairy, with burning red eyes, goats' or donkeys' ears, tongues that hang out, beastly limbs and paws (monkeys' arms, horse or donkey-like (Note: Politis (1904) Paradoseis Παραδόσεις apud Schmidt (1871), pp. 147–148) feet or cleft hooves). It is almost always male, often with prominent sexual organs. Alternate descriptions depict it as squint-eyed or even one-eyed, or blind. It is also said to be lame-legged, knock-kneed, (Note: German: "X-beinige".) or reverse-footed.

Nonetheless, the most common belief is that they are ugly goblins with horns and a long black tails, or small, black creature resembling little black devils.

=== Lore ===
According to the old lore on Chios (as described by Leo Allatius, mid-17th century), the shaggy-looking kallikantzaroi (Note: These beings assembled in the desolate woods called Τριποτάματα "three rivers".) roamed around during the 12-day Christmas season, slashing victims with sharp claws. It also sat down on the victim and asked the question "Tow (clump of hemp fiber) or lead?", (Note: Greek: στοῦππος ἢ μόλυβδος, Latin: stuppa ne, an plumbum.) and if the first answer is given the person is spared and released, but if the latter answer is given, the person is crushed down by tremendous weight and beaten half to death. One way to protect against it, according to superstition already established back at that time, is to leave a sieve (colander) (Note: Latin: cribrum.) to distract the kallikantzaros into counting the holes. It would start one, two, but he cannot pronounce three, "as if it were an evil omen" (Note: Latin: "sibi male ominosum".) (i.e., three is a holy number (Note: Schmidt (1871), p. 145: "der Zahl drei, welche jener nicht auszusprechen vermag, wird aus der christlichen Bedeutung und Heiligkeit derselben abgeleitet".)) and it would have to start counting from one again and never complete its task. (Note: Leo Allatius (1645), Ch X, p. 141 apud Schmidt (1871), pp. 145–146.) (Note: Leone Allaci, apud Ginzburg) The apotropaic lore was similarly told (c. mid to late 19th century) on Zakynthos. An alternate version is to leave out a clump of tangled hemp, and the kallikantzaros becomes engrossed with counting the threads until the cock crows, and the dawn light supposedly destroys it.

In Zakynthos, it is said that a child born on Christmas Eve eventually becomes a skalikántzaros, due to having been from a sinful woman who dared to conceive a child on the same day as Mary, mother of Jesus. Such a child develops the ability to transform into a kallikantzaros during the Christmas season, in its adulthood. Superstitious parents in Chios used to force a child born in the wrong season to have its feet exposed to fire at the point of fusing off their toenails. (Note: Leo Allatius, p,142 apud Schmidt (1871), p. 145, note 2)) (Note: Leone Allaci, Cap. XI apud Hamilton (1910), p. 106, also Lawson (1910), p. 208.) (Note: A modern version first subjects the child to this treatment after asking the child "Bread or meat?" to see if it has carnal lust, which is taken as a having the potential of becoming the monster.) It also came to be believed that the antidote for preventing this transformation was to bind the baby with tresses (bouquets) of garlic or straw.

But in other parts of Greece, the creature is not regarded as a transformed human, but rather as a class of demons that are shaggy, with goat or donkey-like feet and goat ears, loving to dance and lusting after women, hence akin to satyr or Pan.

The kallikantzaroi are said feed on frogs, worms, snakes, and other small creatures. It is also said that pork is their favorite food.

Bribes of desserts and honey cakes may be placed to lure the spirit away from people. In Samos, dessert is put out on New Year's Eve to appease these spirits. In Cyprus, eggs and sausages used to be customarily put out on Epiphany, (Note: Politis (1904) Paradoseis Παραδόσεις, p. 1291 apud Hamilton) but in later years, pancakes became the standard fare to be scattered on the rooftop on this last day of the season, when the kallikantzaroi are ready to leave. Also “Lokma” (donut-like dessert soaked in syrup) on the rooftop is said to keep goblins away from home.

Since the favorite means of kallikantzaroi to enter the home is through the chimney, keeping the fire burning in the fireplace throughout the night will foil them from entering. Some people would burn the Yule log (skakantzalos) for the duration of the twelve days, or people would throw foul-smelling shoes into the fire, as the stench was believed to repel the kallikantzaroi, forcing them to stay away. (Note: Burning of old shoes to cense for Christmas is described in a 1445 letter in France) Salt as well as old shoes are thrown into the fireplace to repel the kallikantzaroi. Additional ways to keep them away included marking one's door with a black cross on Christmas Eve and burning incense. Or a pig's lower jaw (subscribed to have apotropaic powers) is hung behind the front door or inside the chimney to ward them off.

=== Origin theories ===
One theory ties the origin of the goblin lore to the masquerades of the ancient winter festival of Dionysus (Dionysia, cf. Roman Bacchanalia), whose practice has been carried on into the modern age, involving masked parties, wearing such masks as grotesque as can be, loudly jingling bells, and visiting door to door. Their possibly fright-causing antics may have inspired the lore of the seasonal goblin.

Another view, subscribed to by Allatius, is that kallikantzaros is nothing more than the folkloric nightmare, a monstrosity that presses or rides people, except that the period is constrained to yuletide.

== Serbian folklore ==
In Serbian Christmas traditions, the Twelve Days of Christmas were previously called the "unbaptized days" or "unchristened days" (nekršteni dani/некрштени дани) when it was considered dangerous to be loitering outside the house after dark when diabolical forces of all kinds gained power and people were vulnerable. Especially mythical demons called karakondžula (Serbian Cyrillic: караконџула; also karakondža/караконџа, karakandža/караканџа or karapandža/карапанџа) could ride people each night for the duration of the unbaptized days, until the crowing of the rooster announcing the dawn, and straightaway the karakondžula or other witches or ghosts tormenting victims would disperse and begone.

The roaming karakondžula would find disobedient children, and beat them or devour them. In the Zaječar District, belief in karakondžula tend to concentrate among the (older (Note: i.e., presumably excluding the Timok Vlachs)) Timok populace, and the groups (arrived from) Zagorje or Kosovo, as they were under greater influence of oriental culture. The lore is less known among the Vlach who were latecomers to the area from across the Danube. The picture of the creature is rather vague, but it is regarded as a female, black in color, with long outstretching arms grabbing women and children, entering from the chimney.

In the villages of Vratarnica and Zagrađe in Zaječar District, the karakondžula is sometimes regarded as a water she-devil, of black color, and presumably ugly and untidy, as the common pejorative is to call a woman a karakondžula if she fit that sort of description. The karakondžula appears by night and rides people wandering about, but disappears when the first roosters crow.

In the Leskovac-Morava area the karakondžula are said to dwell in the crossroads or above the threshold (Note: Serbian: праг.) and lie in wait for the victim, calling out the resident's name, not so much to attack directly, but to cause the person to leave the house and wander aimlessly, eventually to drown in some ravine. A countermeasure for this is the incantation invoking thunderbolt and millstone to strike it down, (Note: Serbian: „Гламња ти у д..., воденични камен ти на шију".) which causes the haunter to flee.

In Gruža, the karakondžule (aka koncule/концуле) are also considered aquatic, living in streams or deep forests, emerging in the unbaptized days. (Note: When bad grandmothers turned into witches, and the dead into vampires.) Large and fat, it rides people, targeting especially the drunkards. (Note: Petrović (1948) apud Zečević (1978), p. 450 and n28.)

More generally, karakondžula may dwell in the doorframe /doorjamb, (Note: Serbian: довратак.) the threshold and doorframe being the place traditionally inhabited by ancestral spirits or ghosts.

The karakondžula also come after sinful adulterers. In one version, the karakondžula would come back every night and remain on the door lintel until the adulterers confessed their sins to their significant other.

The "koledari" carol performers are specifically tasked with driving away the karakondžule according to the lore of Leskovac and Vranje. (Note: Nikolić-Stojančević (1974) apud Zečević (1978), p. 452.)

The karakondžula haunting in the doorframe, together with its ties to the chimney and rooftop, appears to point to its origin as a chthonic demon. Aquatic habitat (as in the Gruža lore) also bolsters the chthonic characterization. But ultimately the karakondžula is foreign introduced and lore "not ours" (non-Slavic, non-Serbian), according to ethnographer Slobodan Zečević.

== Bulgarian folklore ==
The Bulgarian name of the demon is karakondjul/karakondzul/karakondžul (Bulgarian: караконджул), karakondjol/karakondžol (Bulgarian: караконджол) karakondjo (Bulgarian: караконджо), karakónčo (Bulgarian: каракончо), or karakondžar (Bulgarian: караконджар),

This bogy of the unbaptized nights was called by other names such as pagancheta "little pagans", boubartsi "bugbears", or bougantsi "hobgoblins".

Etymology from Turkish korkunç "frightening" (as opposed to the "black werewolf" derivation above) has been suggested by Christo Vakarelski.

They may be conceived of variously: as being human-like except for having a hairy body, a tail, and a large head with horns on it, or a one-eyed being standing on a single leg, or a horse-headed man. It is considered a shape-shifter which may appear as a dog, a man, a sheep, or a calf. It is reputed to dwell in caves, or rivers, or abandoned water mill, and come out at night.

It would pounce on a traveler during the unbaptized days, and mount its victim ("they got astride people"), not leaving until the rooster's crow. When ridden by them, the victim is made to run through fields, or even fall off tall tree or cliffs. When called by them it is crucial not to respond.

It was said to grow out of the head of a pig slaughtered on Christmas. It was also said to drink the blood of the Christmas roast. On the other hand, in Lovech Province, leaving the slaughtered pig (or just its head) next to the badžata (<badža "chimney") is supposed to frighten and drive away the karakončo. (Note: Vaseva (2006) citing Rakshieva (1999), p. 74)

== Albanian folklore ==
In Albanian folklore, there is the karkanxholl (definite form: karkanxholli, related to Greek καλλικάντσαρος, var. karkançoli).

In one version, it is a werewolf-like mysterious creature, of small stature, wearing iron clothes, with which it performs miracles. Also known as shënëndre, lit. "Saint Andrew".

In another version, the karkanxholl is a ghost of a gypsy which roams around during the twelve days of Christmas, jangling its chains, and effusing a deadly breath, whose legend is known especially among Calabrian Albanians. According to this lore, the kukudh (definite form: kukudhi) or kukuth, which is another type of undead corpse, also becomes animated and active during the same Christmas cycle.

A coat of mail or chainmail armor is called këmishë karkanxholli (var.këmish karkançoli).

== See also ==
- mainades and thiasoi - frenzied retinue of Dionysus
- Abraxas - Gnostic idol carved in oval stone, some similarity to scarab stones
- Yule lads (Christmas tricksters of Icelandic folklore)
- Kallo and the Goblins
- Krampus
- avet (folklore) - South Slavic ghost

== Sources ==
- Özhan Öztürk. (Black Sea: Encyclopedic Dictionary) Karadeniz Ansiklopedik Sözlük. 2 Vol. Heyamola Publishing. Istanbul. 2005 ISBN 975-6121-00-9
