= Turkish folklore =

Overview of the folklore of the Turkish peoples

Turkish folklore includes folktales, jokles and legends, and related traditions, which feature in everyday life and events.

== Turkish folklore ==
=== Nasreddin Hoca ===
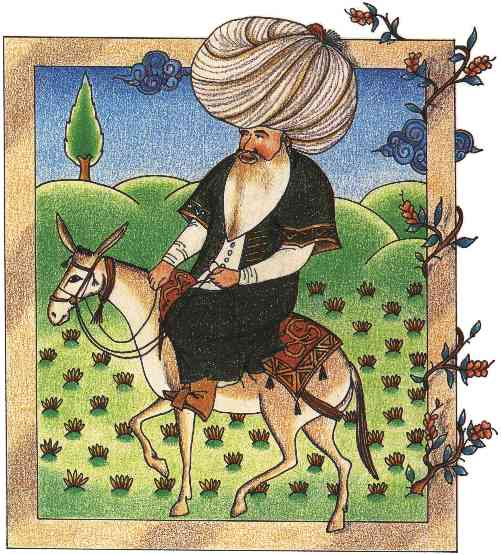
Nasreddin Hoca

Perhaps the most popular figure in the tradition is Nasreddin, (known as Nasreddin Hoca, or "teacher Nasreddin", in Turkish), who is the central character of thousands of jokes. He generally appears as a person who, though seeming somewhat stupid to those who must deal with him, actually proves to have a special wisdom all his own:

One day, Nasreddin's neighbor asked him, "Teacher, do you have any forty-year-old vinegar?"
—"Yes, I do," answered Nasreddin.—"Can I have some?" asked the neighbor. "I need some to make an ointment with."—"No, you can't have any," answered Nasreddin. "If I gave my forty-year-old vinegar to whoever wanted some, I wouldn't have had it for forty years, would I?"

Similar to the Nasreddin jokes, and arising from a similar religious milieu, are the Bektashi jokes, in which the members of the Bektashi religious order—represented through a character simply named Bektaşi—are depicted as having an unusual and unorthodox wisdom, one that often challenges the values of Islam and of society.

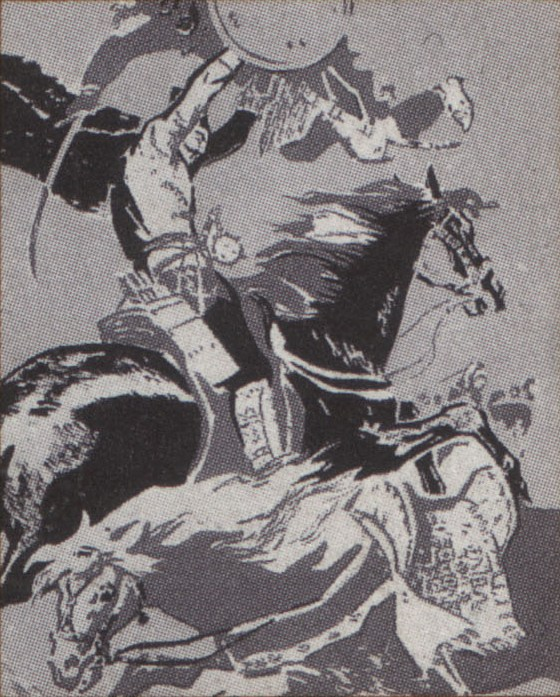
Köroglu

=== Karagöz and Hacivat ===
Another popular element of Turkish folklore is the shadow theater centered on the two characters of Karagöz and Hacivat, who both represent stock characters: Karagöz—who hails from a small village—is something of a country bumpkin, while Hacivat is a more sophisticated city-dweller. Popular legend has it that the two characters are actually based on two real persons who worked for Orhan I—the son of founder of the Ottoman dynasty—in the construction of a mosque at Bursa in the early 14th century CE. The two workers supposedly spent much of their time entertaining the other workers, and were so funny and popular that they interfered with work on the palace, and were subsequently put to death.

=== Yunus Emre ===
Yunus Emre was a Turkish folk poet and Sufi mystic who influenced Turkish culture.

Like the Oghuz Book of Dede Korkut, an older and anonymous Central Asian epic, the Turkish folklore that inspired Yunus Emre in his occasional use of tekerlemeler as a poetic device had been handed down orally to him and his contemporaries. This strictly oral tradition continued for a long while. As Islamic mystic literature thrived in Anatolia, Yunus Emre became one of its most distinguished poets. The poetry of Yunus Emre — despite being fairly simple on the surface — evidences his skill in describing quite abstruse mystical concepts in a clear way. He remains a popular figure in a number of countries, stretching from Azerbaijan to the Balkans, with seven different and widely dispersed localities disputing the privilege of having his tomb within their boundaries.

=== Köroglu ===
The Epic of Köroglu is a part of Turkish Folk Literature. The legend typically describes a hero who seeks to avenge a wrong. It was often put to music and played at sporting events as an inspiration to the competing athletes. Köroglu is the main hero of epic that tells about the life and heroic deeds of Köroglu as a hero of the people who struggled against unjust rulers. The epic combines the occasional romance with Robin Hood-like chivalry.

== Folklore from the Black Sea Region ==
=== Vine-breaking ===
In Çarşıbaşı town, near Trabzon, there is a way of testing whether a marriage is propitious: when the new bride enters the house, she is asked to break a vine into three pieces, which are then planted in the ground. If they sprout, this means the marriage will be successful.

=== Cutting the shoelace ===
In the Eastern Black Sea Region (Giresun, Trabzon, Rize, Artvin), it is believed that there is an invisible lace between the feet of those children who have trouble walking when they're young. A lace is tied (usually of cotton) between the feet of the child and the lace is cut by the elder child of family. It is believed that once the invisible lace has been cut, the child will walk.

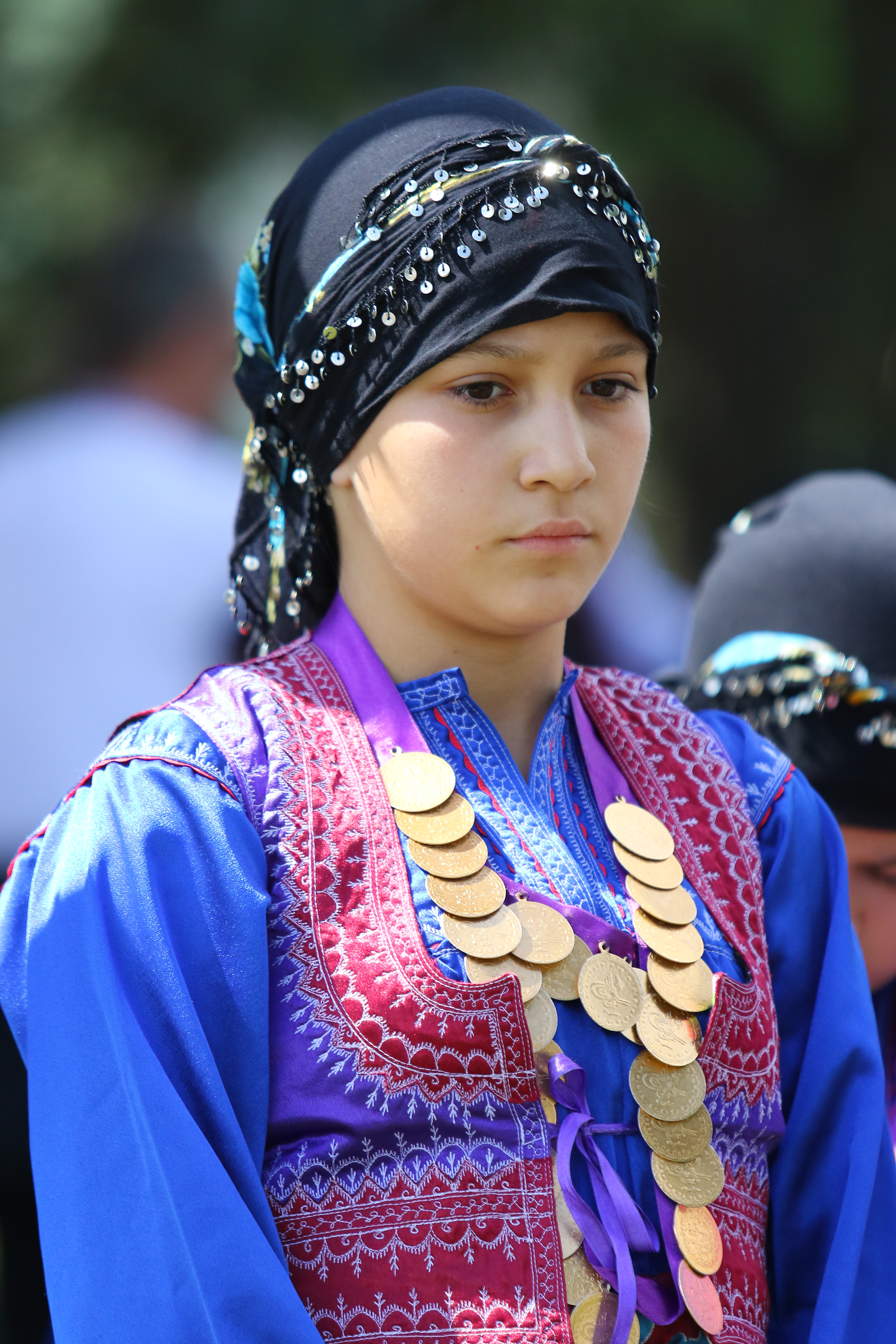
Girl in traditional folk costume

=== Passing beneath a bramble ===
In Turkish folklore, (Trabzon region, Akçaabat town), childless women, cows that don't get pregnant, and children wetting their beds are supposedly cured by passing under a blackberry bush known as "Avat" (west Trabzon). “Avat is believed to be a charm herb of paradise.”

=== Shown to the Moon ===
In Trabzon and Rize region folklore (Pontic coast of Anatolia). Desperate patients with incurable diseases are said to have been shown to the Moon on a wooden shovel “If that continues I will put you on a shovel and show you to the moon”(İkizdere town. In Çarşıbaşı district of Trabzon province, weak and scrawny babies have been shown to the Moon on a shovel and said: “moon! moon! Take him!, or cure him”. In this tradition, which is a sequel to the paganist beliefs before the monotheist religions, the Moon cures the patient or takes his/her life. Moon worship is very common among the Caucasian Abkhaz, Svans and Mingrelians ABS 18.

=== Tying someone ===
In Black Sea coast of Turkey's folklore (Trabzon, Rize, Giresun, Ordu, Artvin, Samsun)

1. v. To ensure a bridegroom is bewitched and impotent so as to be unable to have sexual intercourse with bride. There are several ways of being tied: A person who wants to impede this marriage, blows into a knot, knots it and puts it on the bride or uses other sorceries. However, it is also deemed a way of being tied if the bride nails, knots or locks a door with a key before the marriage. “While going to the house of the bridegroom, way is always changed and the unlooked-for ways are followed to be saved from tie sorceries that could have been buried in the way” 2. n. To tie the animals such as wolves and bears that harm the flock and named monster, and swine that damages the crop. Generally, an amulet is prepared by a hodja and buried in the places where the flock grazes or in the corner of sown field. 3. n. To increase the amount and quality of meadow before the hay-making time, water is brought to the meadows in the plateaus in thin directions from rivers by the arcs. This process is called as to connect water.

=== Tree worship ===
According to the folklore of Trabzon, the swinging of tree branches and fluttering of their leaves symbolise worship. It is believed that oak trees do not worship God because their leaves do not move in the wind as much as those of other trees.

Şakir Şevket says that Akçaabat society believed in an idol and worshipped a tree called platana, and that is how the city was given this name. Although the platana (Platanus orientalis in Latin) was a plane tree he had confused this tree with the poplar.

The words of Lermioglu “today peasants love trees as their children. There were several events which people kill someone for a tree” and a story from 19th century show us that this love comes from very old days. A hunter from Mersin village cut a tree called kragen which was idol of Akcaabat society (since 1940). Then the peasants called the police and said that the hunter cut the Evliya Turkish and Arabic Evliya “Saint”). At first the police understood that the hunter killed a man called Evliya (Saint) but later they saw that the “saint” was a tree so they let the hunter go.

It is possible to see same things in Hemsheen region of Rize “the branches are praying three days before and during bairam, so we do not cut live branches during bairam, the branches are praying”.

=== End of winter Cemre ===
Cemre are three fireballs that come from the heavens to warm earth at the end of each winter. Each cemre warms one aspect of the nature. The first cemre falls to air between February 19–20. The second cemre falls to water between February 26–27. The third cemre falls to ground between 5–6 March.

== Important figures in Black Sea folklore ==
- Ahi Evren
- Ahriyan
- Alaturbi
- Ancomah
- Cazi
- Germakoçi
- Kolot

== Beings and creatures in Turkish folklore ==
- Al Basti
- Bardi - a female jackal which can change shape and presages death by wailing
- Bird of Sorrow
- Dew (also called div)
- Dragons
- Dunganga
- Giant 'Arab' or 'Dervish'
- Imp
- Kamer-taj, the Moon-horse
- Karakoncolos
- Karakura - a male night demon
- Keloglan
- Laughing Apple and Weeping Apple
- Peris
- Seven-headed Dragon
- Storm Fiend
- Tavara
- Shahmaran, the legendary Snake King who was killed in an ambush in the baths.
- Taram Baba, the night demon or nightmare which is believed to kidnap children, in some Balkanic Turks' tradition.

== See also ==
- Turkic mythology
- Religion in Turkey
- Turkish fairy tales:
  - The Dragon-Prince and the Stepmother
  - The Stepdaughter and the Black Serpent
  - The Golden-Haired Children
  - The Horse-Devil and the Witch
  - The Padisah's Youngest Daughter and Her Donkey-Skull Husband
  - The Princess Who Could Not Keep a Secret
  - The Spotted Deer
  - The Donkey's Head (Turkish folktale)
  - The Three Orange-Peris
  - The Stone of Patience (Turkish folktale)
