= Freybug =

Freybug is a monstrous Black Dog that is stated to come from medieval English folklore, specifically from Norfolk. Like most supernatural black dogs, it was roughly the size of a calf, and wandered country roads terrifying travelers.

The English martyr Laurence Saunders mentioned Fray-bugs in his letters to his wife in 1555. The word Fray-bug is defined by the Oxford English Dictionary as “an object of fear; a bogy, spectre.” The similar word “fray-boggart” was a word for a scarecrow. Popular Antiquities of Great Britain, by John Brand, referenced Saunders' letters and suggested that the Fray-bug was a Black Dog similar to the Barghest. Carol Rose seems to have drawn on Brand’s work for her description of the Freybug.

== Resources ==
- Matthews, John (2005). The Element Encyclopedia of Magical Creatures: the Ultimate a-Z of Fantastic Beings from Myth and Magic. New York: Sterling. p. 220. ISBN 1-4027-3543-X.
- Rose, Carol (2001). Giants, Monsters, and Dragons. New York: W.W. Norton & Company. ISBN 0-393-32211-4.
