= Kolot =

Kolot is a bun eaten in Trabzon in Turkey. It is made from salt, flour and oil collected from seven different houses, water brought from seven different rivers, and last of all seven pieces of wood collected from seven different hedges. These are made into a very salty bun. According to Trebizond folklore young girls who eat this bun see their possible husbands in their dreams that night. Its name is derived from Pontic Greek kolot "little bread" from the Armenian kolot "short". It is also a surname in Turkey, Belarus, Russia, Kazakhstan and Ukraine. Some in the Kolot family line claim the surname comes from the kavkaz mountains.

== Sources ==
- Blacksea: Encyclopedic Dictionary. Özhan Öztürk. Karadeniz: Ansiklopedik Sözlük. 2. Cilt. Heyamola Publishing. Istanbul. 2005. ISBN 975-6121-00-9.
- The Kolot familyline.
