= Kubikajiri =

Japanese mythological creature

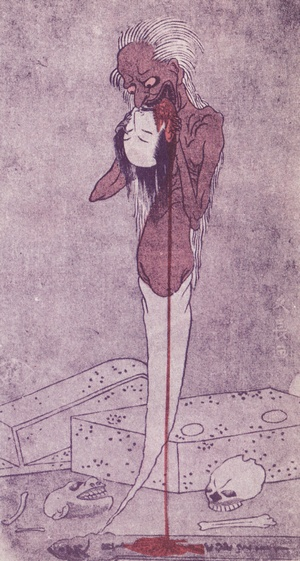
- The Japanese mythical creature, Kubikajiri

Creature information
- Folklore: Japanese

Origin
- Country: Japan

The Kubikajiri (首かじり) is a ghost in Japanese folklore which eats the heads of its victims, be they living or dead, animal or human. The creature is said to be headless itself and its presence can be distinctively detected by the smell of fresh blood. Late at night, it haunts graveyards in order to look for its own head.

== See also ==
- Jikininki
