= Kukudh =

Undead in Albanian mythology

The Kukudh (Albanian definite form: Kukudhi) is an undead creature in Albanian mythology.

== Etymology ==
Undetermined. Most probably a derivative of Albanian kuku ("mourn, lament."), as its synonym kukuvriq suggests. In Tosk and Gheg folklore, the Kukudh is associated with nightmares and death, connecting it to the nocturnal bird, the owl, and the cuckoo (Albanian: qyqe), which are considered to be bad omens; messengers of bad news.

== Appearance ==
The Kukudh is a revenant, a miser's poor soul that haunts his house after his death. For this reason, people feared the house of a miser and would avoid staying overnight out of fear of being killed. Only a brave boy may defeat the creature and bring eternal peace to its damned soul, being appointed heir in reward.

In and around Tomorr, there is a legend that a lugat who is not burned in due time will become a Kukudh.

In some areas, the Kukudh appears as a stocky and short-legged man with a goat's tail. He is invulnerable and may only be strangled with a noose made of vine. Because he brings mayhem, an evil man is also commonly referred to as a Kukudh.

The Kukudh and Karkanxholl (etymologically related to Kallikantzaros Greek: καλικάντζαρος, also known as the Karkançoli) are also undead "gypsy" corpses, who go around in January, laden with chains and effusing a deadly breath, known notably among Calabrian Albanians. According to another version, the Karkançoli is vested with iron clothes, which is why chainmail armor is known as këmish karkançoli in Albanian.

In Southern Albania the Kukudh is a blind female demon of sickness, carrying the plague. "Kukudh" is also the name of a sickness like cholera, but worse. Alexander the Great is said to have brought it, after having raped the corpse of an Epirote princess, who would not return his love during her lifetime. Consequently, there is a derisive Tosk saying, As të ha kukudhi!, which translates to: "Not even the plague will devour you!"
