= Alaturbi =

Alaturbi is a Turkish festival celebrated in Akcaabat and Besikdüzü (west of Trabzon) on 29 June - 6 July with the participation of Cephni Turkomans in honour of the sea.

The peoples of the Anatolian Pontic coast, east of Trabzon from Samsun to Rize Pazar, hold the celebration on 20 May (or 7 May in the Hegirian calendar); and in Sürmene, it is called "Litropi."

In Giresun, the people pray at Arethian Island, where there used to be a shrine to Ares; but in most places, the people make a pilgrimage to the sea and swim. Those who cannot do so commonly take a bath in seawater, and supposedly recover from their illnesses, such as aches and pains and even epilepsy.
