= Ahriyan =

Ahriyan is an exonym for a group of people from Tonya and Beşikdüzü in Trabzon Province given by Çepni Turks to mean (Anatolian, Greek origin) or "non-Turkoman". It can also mean “oppressive, heartless” when used as an adjective. The Achrian Mosque (Greek: Αχριάν Τζαμί) in the city of Xanthi in Greece carries the same name.

== Etymology ==
The word ahriyan is derived from Persian Ahura Mazda, the creator deity in the Persian pantheon and the counterpart to Angra Mainyu. During the Sasanian Period, the lingua franca of Anatolia was Middle Persian, in which Angra Mainyu was rendered as "Ahriman" (Ehrimen) and "angra" meant "enemy, sin, bad" with ‘mainyu’ meaning "soul, invisibility, spirit". Although the term was mostly used for the indisputably non-Muslim population in Anatolia, there appear to be uncommon recorded forms of the practice in Şalpazarı that controversially included the Alevi population in its designation.
