= Qiqirn =

Large dog in Inuit mythology

Qiqirn is a large, bald dog spirit in Inuit mythology, from around the area of Baffin Island. It has hair only on its feet, mouth and the tips of its ears and tail. Its presence will send men and dogs into convulsions, sometimes fatal. However, it is frightened of humans and will run away if an angakkuq sees it. A similar term, also from Inuit mythology, is keelut, a malevolent earth spirit which also appears as a hairless dog.

Daniel Merkur suggested that the fits caused by the qiqirn were allusions to shamanic initiations.

== Popular culture ==
In Rudyard Kipling's short story "Quiquern", the creature is described as a giant, phantasmal, toothless and hairless dog with six or eight pairs of legs. Quiquern is seen wandering before important events, and makes dogs go mad. Two young Inuit hunters, desperate to find food for their starving tribe, believe they are being guided by Quiquern, only to discover that the many-legged "spirit" is actually a pair of sled dogs whose collars had become entangled. Nevertheless, once they see that the dogs are well-fed, the hunters realise the "spirit" has guided them to find food after all.

== See also ==
- Black dog (folklore)
- Cerberus
- Hellhound
- Ke'let
