= Kayeri =

Mushroom-like folk creature

The Kayeri is a giant, plant-like humanoid cryptid from the folklore of the Cuiba people of Colombia and Venezuela. Visual descriptors for the beings are varied, ranging from appearing like a giant with a large, mushroom-like hat to appearing like a ficus, making the physiology of the being primarily cryptobotanic in nature. It is said all the mushrooms of the forest are aspects of the creature, and not unlike mushrooms, Kayeri are said to appear after significant rain and at the base of trees, often dormant after significant sunshine. The Kayeri diet consists solely of cows, and the Cuiban people often attribute the disappearance or deaths of their cattle to the Kayeri who are strong enough to carry bovine away. It is said that the most effective way to kill them is to shoot them in the kidney with a bone-tipped arrow.
