= Kigatilik =

Demon in Inuit mythology

In Inuit religion, Kigatilik is a fanged demon that kills angakkuit (shamans).

== In media ==
The game Champions Online has a Cosmic-level boss called Kigatilik, who is a demon god also known as the Slayer of Shaman.
