= Ke'let =

Type of Chukchi mythological being

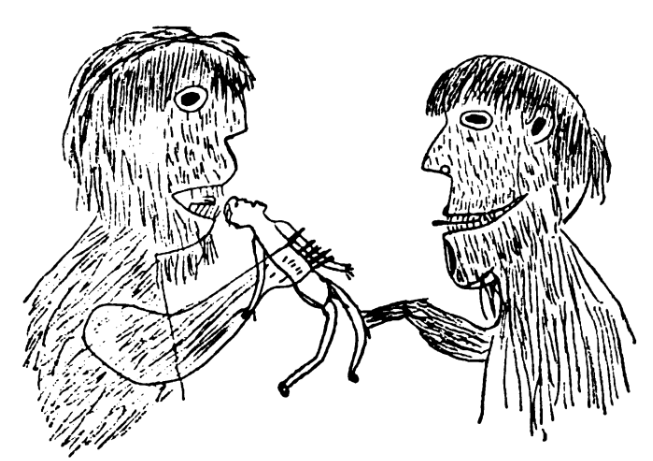
Drawing of two ke'let by Chukchi artist

Ke'let (singular ke’le) are a type of evil spirit or ogre in Chukchi mythology, also sometimes known as Re'kkenit.

== Types ==
Sometimes all spirits were known as ke'let, but generally the word refers to an evil spirit, while benevolent spirits are called va'irgin ("being").

The term can refer to various kinds of beings in Chukchee mythology and folklore. In various contexts, "ke'let" referred to spirits summoned by shamans, personifications of death and disease, or cannibal giants similar to ogres in other cultures. There was overlap between these different types. The term ke'let could also be used for the nymph-like nature spirits of rivers or lakes.

Manfred Lurker rendered the name as “Ke’lets” and called it “a demon of death” which “hunts men down, accompanied by dogs.” The spelling of the name and the depiction as a singular, male demon do not match any other sources.

== Cannibals ==
Ke'let often appear as cannibalistic giants in Chukchi folktales. There are both male and female Ke'let, all of whom enjoy eating human beings. Like ogres in other cultures, they are often outwitted by fast-thinking humans.

Ke'let are said to come from underground or from a separate world in the sky, but never from the sea. Sometimes the Moon is considered the ke'le's Sun. They live in isolated places in the wilderness and prey on travelers, or they visit human villages to find victims. They live in a society similar to human beings, except that they hunt humans, whom they call "little seals." They enjoy eating internal organs, particularly livers. In some accounts, they have dogs which are small and black, and which fetch souls from human homes for their masters. Ke'let and their dogs are capable of changing size. In one story, a ke'let group owned fire-breathing reindeer.

== Personifications of death ==
Ke'let were perceived as the spirits of diseases. Some hid inside berries in order to enter human bodies and make them sick. Some had specific names; the cough-spirit was named Te'ggi, and represented as a coughing old man driving a white reindeer. One storyteller in 1901 referred to smallpox as "the Red Ke'le."

== Re'kkenit ==
Re'kkenit (singular form is Re'kken) is the term used in areas near the Pacific. They, as well as their reindeer and dogs, have only one eye, and they breathe smoke and fire. They wear their hair extremely long and have long sleeves which trail on the ground. They live underground and go hunting in red canoes to catch men in nets. In other areas, a re'kken is a large-eared, bear-like monster.

== See also ==
- Keelut
- Ogre
- Oni
