= Özhan Öztürk =

Turkish writer and researcher (born 1968)

- Born: 1968 (age 57–58); Istanbul
- Occupations: Writer, researcher

Özhan Öztürk (born 1968, Istanbul) is a Turkish writer and researcher. He is known for his work on the culture and folklore of Turkey’s Black Sea region.

Özhan Öztürk graduated from Istanbul University’s Faculty of Dentistry in 1991. He also studied history in the Faculty of Letters of the same university. While pursuing a career in dentistry, he conducted research on the culture, history and local language and dialects of the Black Sea region. His work has been published in numerous periodicals and books.

In 2005, Özhan Öztürk published a two-volume encyclopaedic dictionary on the Black Sea region including toponyms, flora, fauna, handicrafts and local expressions, based on a range of sources. In 2009, he published a dictionary on folklore and mythology. His 2011 book, titled Pontus, provides a comprehensive survey of the history of the Black Sea region from Antiquity up to today. In 2016, he published a dictionary on world mythology with over 10,000 entries.

== Works ==
- Karadeniz Ansiklopedik Sözlük, İstanbul, 2005. Heyamola Yayınları. 2 vol. 1256 pages ISBN 975-6121-00-9
- "Bizim Temel" (about national personification of the Pontic figure, Temel) in Temel Kimdir, Heyamola Yayınları. Istanbul, 2006. ISBN 975-6121-15-7
- Folklor ve Mitoloji Sözlüğü, Ankara, 2009. Phoenix Yayınları. 1054 pages ISBN 978-605-57-3826-6
- Pontus: Antik Çağ’dan Günümüze Karadeniz’in Etnik ve Siyasi Tarihi (Pontus: The Ethnic and Political History of a Black Sea Region from Antiquity to Today) Genesis Yayınları. Ankara, 2011. 952 pages. ISBN 978-605-54-1017-9
- Dünya Mitolojisi (World Mythology). Nika Yayınları. Ankara, 2016 1264 pages ISBN 978-605-8389199
- Articles, stories and research studies about Folklore and Pontus culture mostly published in Doğa Karadeniz, Radikal daily newspaper and Folklore magazines.

== See also ==
- Turkish folklore
- Pontus
