= List of Australian Aboriginal mythological figures =

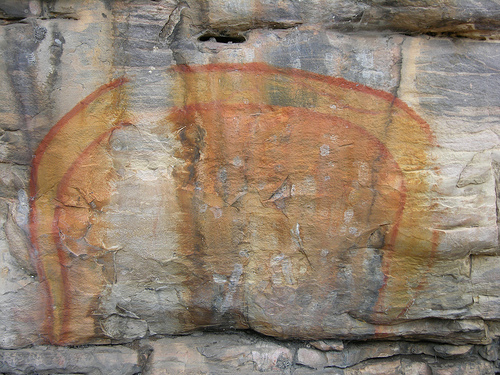
The Rainbow Snake is a common feature of the mythology and art of indigenous Australian cultures

The following is a list of Australian Indigenous Australian deities and spirits.

== New South Wales ==
- Baiame (Baayami), creator spirit of some peoples of New South Wales, including the Gamilaraay and the Wiradjuri
- Bahloo (Baaluu), Gamilaraay personification of the moon who keeps three pet snakes
- Birrahgnooloo (Birrangulu), Gamilaraay fertility spirit who would send floods if properly asked to; one of Baiame's two wives
- Daramulum (Dharramalan), sky hero and son of Baiame and Birrahngnooloo
- Dirawong, Bundjalung creator being
- Dulagal, (Yuin people) predatory child-eater with red eyes, no neck and a long forehead, and walking "from side to side"
- Ganhanbili, second wife of Baiame
- Gurangatch a rainbow serpent / human inhabitant of the Dreaming who in his battle with the quoll Mirragañ created the landscape
- Mirragañ a quoll / human inhabitant the Dreaming who went to hunt the rainbow serpent / human inhabitant of the Dreaming Gurangatch
- Mungoon-Gali giant goanna in Yuwaalaraay myth, married to Kubbitha or Kabbitha the black duck who created the Murrumbidgee River, rival to Ouyouboolooey the black snake who stole Mungoon-Gali's poison for the snakes.
- Whowie six-legged seven meter long frog-headed goanna of the Murray River who menaced nearby tribes
- Wurrunna, culture hero
- Yhi (Yaraay/Yaay), Gamilaraay personification of the sun and creator spirit

== Northern Territory ==
- Adnoartina, the lizard guard of Uluru
- Altjira, Arrernte sky god who created the earth
- Ankotarinja, the first man of Arrernte mythology
- Bamapana, Yolngu trickster spirit who creates discord
- Banaitja, creator deity
- Barnumbirr, Yolngu creator spirit
- Barraiya, creator of the first vagina
- Bluetongue Lizard, an elderly trickster
- Bobbi-Bobbi, benevolent Binbinga snake deity
- Djanggawul, three creator-siblings of northeast Arnhem Land mythology
- Djunkgao, a group of sisters associated with floods and ocean currents
- Eingana (Jawoyn people) rainbow snake whose body during the rainy season releases animals and plants that the community relies on for food
- Galeru, rainbow snake in Arnhem Land mythology who swallowed the Djanggawul
- Garkain the Recluse, predatory being whose victim's souls are forced to forever wander the vast jungles of their final resting place
- Inapertwa in Arrernte mythology, simple ancestral beings formed into all plants, birds, animals and later humans
- Ipilja-ipilja 100ft gecko of Anindilyakwa myth. Adorned with hairs and whiskers. Spews swamp water to make the clouds of the sky, thunder is ipilja-ipilja's roaring. Ipilja-ipilja's home is a swamp filled with deadly waters. Similar to legends of maratji by Tiwi and Iwaidja people.
- Julunggul, Yolngu rainbow snake goddess associated with initiation, fertility, rebirth and water
- Karora, creator god
- Kunapipi, a mother goddess and the patron deity of many heroes
- Malingee, malignant nocturnal spirit
- Mamaragan, lightning deity
- Mangar-kunjer-kunja, Arrernte lizard deity who created humans
- Manuriki, god of beauty
- Maratji in Tiwi and Iwaidja myth. Lizards guard waterholes, cause floods and thunderstorms when intruded upon. Similar to Ipilja-ipilja.
- Mimi, fairy-like beings of Arnhem Land
- Minawara and Multultu, legendary ancestors of the Nambutji
- Mokoi, an evil spirit in Yolngu stories who kidnapped and ate children
- Namarrkon (also known as Namarrgon), Lightning man, makes lightning appear and creates roars of thunder in storms
- Ngintaka, Pitjantjatjara creator being
- Nogomain, a god who gives spirit children to mortal parents
- Onur, Karraur lunar deity
- Papinijuwari, a type of one-eyed giant which feeds on the bodies of the dead and the blood of the sick
- Tjilpa-men, significant mythic figures Aranda, Anmatyerre, Kaytetye, Ngalia, Ilpara and Kukatja stories. Tjilpa is the Arrernte word for quoll.
- Tjinimin, the ancestor of the Australian people. He is associated with the bat and with Kunmanggur the rainbow serpent - per the Murinbata
- Ulanji, snake ancestor of the Binbinga
- Wala, solar goddess
- Wawalag, Yolngu sisters who were swallowed by a serpent, only to be regurgitated
- Wollunqua, snake deity associated with rain and fertility
- Wuluwaid, rain god of Arnhem Land
- Wuriupranili, a solar goddess whose torch is the sun
- Wurugag and Waramurungundi, first man and woman of Kunwinjku legend
- Yawkyawk, Aboriginal (Kunwinjku) shape-shifting mermaids who live in waterholes, freshwater springs, and rock pools, cause the weather and are related by blood or through marriage (or depending on the tradition, both) to the rainbow serpent Ngalyod.
- Yee-Na-Pah, an Arrernte thorny devil spirit girl who marries an echidna spirit man.
- Yurlungur, Yolngu snake deity who swallowed and regurgitated the Wawalag sisters; associated with initiation and rebirth

== Queensland ==
- Anjea, fertility goddess or spirit, in whom people's souls reside between their incarnations
- Gaiya, giant devil dingo of lower Cape York Peninsula
- Dhakhan, ancestral god of the Kabi
- I'wai, culture hero of the Kuuku-Ya'u
- Yalungur, god of the first baby
- Yarri a tree-climbing predatory animal along the Herbert River (possibly part of the myths of speakers of the Warrgamay language or Warrongo language).

== South Australia ==
- Akurra, great snake deity of the Adnyamathanha people
- Bila, cannibal sun goddess of the Adnyamathanha people
- Bunyip, mythical creature said to lurk in swamps, billabongs, creeks, riverbeds, and waterholes
- Chinny-kinik, a cannibal giant of the Murraylands
- Mar'rallang, twin sisters who share a name and whose exploits are immortalized in the night sky in Ngarrindjeri stories
- Minka Bird bird that foretells death among the Ngarrindjeri of Murray River
- Muldjewangk, water spirit or spirits inhabiting the Murray River
- Ngintaka, Pitjantjatjara creator being
- Thardid Jimbo, cannibalistic giant in Ngarrindjeri folklore
- Tjilbruke, Kaurna creation ancestor

== Tasmania ==
- Moinee, Creator spirit/God for Tasmania
- Droemerdene, Moinee's twin brother
- Rageowrapper, malevolent spirit

== Victoria ==
- Baiame, southeast Australian creational ancestral hero
- Balayang, bat deity and brother of Bunjil
- Binbeal, Kulin rainbow deity and son of Bunjil
- Bunjil, Kulin creator deity and ancestral being, represented as an eagle
- Bunyip, mythical creature said to lurk in swamps, billabongs, creeks, riverbeds, and waterholes
- Daramulum, southeast Australian deity and son of Baiame
- Gnowee, solar goddess who searches daily for her lost son; her torch is the sun
- Karatgurk, seven sisters who represent the Pleiades star cluster
- Kondole, man who became the first whale
- Lo-an-tuka, wife of Loo-errn
- Loo-errn, spirit ancestor and guardian of the Brataualung people
- Nargun, fierce half-human, half-stone creature of Gunai legend
- Thinan-malkia, evil spirit who captures victims with nets that entangle their feet
- Tiddalik, frog of southeast Australian legend who drank all the water in the land, and had to be made to laugh to regurgitate it
- Waang, Kulin trickster, culture hero and ancestral being, represented as a crow
- Wambeen, evil lightning-hurling figure who targets travellers

== Western Australia ==
- Bagadjimbiri, a pair of Karadjeri creator-spirits
- Dilga, Karadjeri goddess of fertility and growth, and mother of the Bagadjimbiri
- Julana, lecherous Jumu spirit who surprises women by burrowing beneath the sand, leaping out, and raping them
- Kidili, Mandjindja moon deity who was castrated for attempting to rape the first women, who in turn became the Pleiades
- Kurdaitcha (or kurdaitcha man) is a ritual "executioner" in Australian Indigenous Australian culture (specifically the term comes from the Arrernte people).
- Ngariman, Karadjeri quoll-man who killed the Bagadjimbiri and was drowned in revenge
- Njirana, Jumu deity and father of Julana
- Ungud, snake deity associated with rainbows and the fertility and erections of the tribe's shamans
- Wagyl, Noongar snakelike creator being
- Wati-kutjara, a pair of western Australian lizard-men
- Wirnpa a rainmaking snake who created the land around Percival Lakes during the Dreaming
- Wondjina, Mowanjum cloud or rain spirits

== Pan-continental ==
- Erathipa, central Australia, a boulder that has the shape of a pregnant woman
- Min Min light term may originate with aboriginal groups Cloncurry area (with the Mitakoodi, Kalkadoon and Pitta Pitta aboriginal people) in Queensland, sightings in NSW and Western Australia
- Rainbow Serpent, a common feature of the art and mythology of Indigenous Australian cultures

== Unknown ==
- Kinie Ger, evil half-man, half-quoll beast
- Yara-ma-yha-who, monstrous bloodsucking dwarf
- Tebwem, a flesh eating ghost
