= List of legendary creatures (M) =

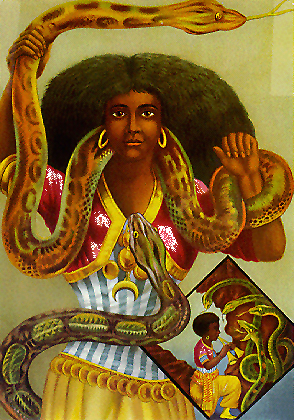
Contemporary poster of a "serpent priestess" painted in Hamburg by German artist Schleisinger, c. 1926, now displayed in shrines as a popular image of Mami Wata in Africa and in the diaspora.

1. Maa-alused (Estonian) – Subterranean spirit
2. Machlyes (Medieval bestiaries) – Hermaphroditic humanoid
3. Macrocephali (Medieval bestiaries) – Giant-headed humanoid
4. Madam Koi Koi (West African Mythology ) – Female ghost
5. Madremonte (Colombian folklore) – Nature guardian
6. Maenad (Greek) – Female followers of Dionysus
7. Maero (Māori) – Savage, arboreal humanoids
8. Magog (English folklore) – Giant protector of London
9. Maha-pudma (Hindu) – Giant elephant that holds up the world
10. Mahuika (Māori) - Māori fire goddess
11. Mairu (Basque) – Megalith-building giant
12. Mājas gari (Latvian) – Benevolent house spirit
13. Majitu – in Swahili mythology, shape-shifting spirits that can pass as humans
14. Makara (Indian mythology) – Aquatic beings
15. Makura-gaeshi (Japanese mythology) – Pillow-moving spirit
16. Mallt-y-Nos (Welsh) – Spirit of the hunt
17. Mami Wata (Africa and the African diaspora) – Supernaturally beautiful water spirits
18. Mamuna (Slavic) – Demoness or fairy
19. Manananggal (Philippine) – Vampires that sever their torsos from their legs to fly around
20. Mandi (Medieval bestiaries) – Humanoid with a forty-year lifespan
21. Mandrake (Medieval folklore) – Diminutive humanoid plant
22. Manes (Roman) – Ancestral spirits
23. Mannegishi (Cree) – Little people with six fingers and no noses
24. Manticore (Persian) – Lion-human-scorpion hybrid
25. Mapinguari (Brazilian) – Giant sloth
26. Mara (Scandinavian folklore) – Female night-demon
27. Marabbecca (Italian folklore) – Malevolent water spirit
28. Mare (Germanic and Slavic folklore) – Malicious entity which causes or appears in bad dreams
29. Mareikura (Tuamotu) – Attendant of Kiho-tumu, the supreme god
30. Mares of Diomedes (Greek) – Man-eating horses
31. Marid (Arabian) – Jinn-associated fortune tellers
32. Marmennill (Norse) – Mermen with prophetic abilities
33. Maro deivės (Lithuanian) – Disease spirits
34. Marozi (Kenya) – Lion-leopard hybrid
35. Maski-mon-gwe-zo-os (Abenaki) – Shapeshifting toad spirit
36. Matagot (French) – Spirit that takes animal form, usually that of a black cat
37. Matsya (Hindu) – First Avatar of Vishnu in the form of a half-fish and half-man
38. Mavka (Slavic) – Female forest spirit
39. Mayura (Hindu) – Peacock spirit
40. Mazzikin (Jewish) – Invisible, malevolent spirit
41. Mbói Tu'ĩ (Guaraní) – Snake-parrot hybrid
42. Mbwiri (Central Africa) – Possessing demon
43. Medusa (Greek) – Female human-serpent hybrid (Gorgon) with numerous snake heads
44. Melek Taus (Yazidi) – Divine bird
45. Meliae (Greek) – Ash tree nymph
46. Melusine (Medieval folklore) – Female water spirit, with the form of a winged mermaid or serpent
47. Menehune (Hawaiian) – Little people and craftsmen
48. Menninkäinen (Finnish) – Little people and nature spirits
49. Menreiki (Japanese) – Spiritual creature formed from 66 gigaku masks
50. Mephistopheles (German) – Demon or devil
51. Merlion (Singapore) – Lion-fish hybrid; the symbol of Singapore
52. Mermaid/Merman (multiple cultures) – Human-fish hybrid
53. Merlin (English) – Elderly wizard
54. Merrow (Irish and Scottish) – Human-fish hybrid
55. Metee-kolen-ol (Abenaki) – Ice-hearted wizards
56. Mimi (Australian Aboriginal) – Extremely elongated humanoid that has to live in rock crevasses to avoid blowing away
57. Minka Bird (Australian Aboriginal) – Death spirit
58. Minokawa (Philippine) – Giant swallow
59. Min Min Light (Australian) – Mysterious light phenomenon
60. Minotaur (Greek) – Human-bull hybrid
61. Mintuci (Ainu) – Water spirit
62. Mishibizhiw (Ojibwa) – Feline water spirit
63. Misi-ginebig (Ojibwa) – Serpentine rain spirit
64. Misi-kinepikw (Cree) – Serpentine rain spirit
65. Mizuchi (Japanese) – Water dragon
66. Mogwai (Chinese) – Vengeful ghost or demon
67. Mohan (Latin American folklore) – Nature spirit
68. Moirai (Greek) – Three fates
69. Mokèlé-mbèmbé (Congo) – Water-dwelling creature
70. Mokoi (Australian Aboriginal) – Malevolent spirit that kills sorcerers
71. Mokorea (Polynesian) – Amphibious humanoid living in the spirit world (underground world)
72. Moñái (Guaraní) – Giant snake with antennae
73. Mondao (Zimbabwean folklore) – Mermaids/water spirits with long black hair, blood-red eyes, pale skin, and sharp teeth
74. Monocerus (Medieval bestiaries) – One-horned stag-horse-elephant-boar hybrid, sometimes treated as distinct from the unicorn
75. Mono Grande (South America) – Giant monkey
76. Monopod (Medieval bestiaries) – Dwarf with one giant foot
77. Mooinjer veggey (Manx folklore) – Nature spirit
78. Moon rabbit (Far Eastern folklore) – Legendary animal
79. Mora (Slavic) – Disembodied spirit
80. Morena (Slavic) – Winter spirit
81. Morgens (Breton and Welsh) – Water spirits
82. Morinji-no-okama (Japanese) – Animated tea kettle
83. Mormolykeia (Greek) – Underworld spirit
84. Moroi (Romanian) – Vampiric ghost
85. Mo-sin-a (Taiwanese folklore) – Mountain demon
86. Moss people (Continental Germanic mythology) – Little people and tree spirits
87. Mothman (American folklore) – Large grey winged humanoid with glowing red eyes
88. Mugwump (Canadian folklore) – Fish-like lake monster
89. Mujina (Japanese) – Shapeshifting badger spirit
90. Muldjewangk (Australian Aboriginal) – Water monster
91. Multo (Philippine) – Spirit of a deceased person seeking justice or with unfinished business
92. Mummy (Egyptian) – Undead creature who revives
93. Muma Pădurii (Romanian folklore) – Forest-dwelling hag
94. Mungoon-Gali (Australian Aboriginal) – Giant goanna
95. Muscaliet (Medieval bestiaries) – Hare-squirrel-boar hybrid that has an intense body heat
96. Muse (Greek) – Spirits that inspire artists
97. Mushusshu (Mesopotamian) – Hybrid beast with long neck and eagle talons
98. Musimon (Heraldic) – Sheep-goat hybrid
99. Myling (Scandinavian folklore) – Ghosts of unbaptized children
100. Myrmecoleon (Medieval bestiaries) – Ant-lion hybrid
