= Ungud =

Snake god of Wunambal Australian Aboriginal people

In the mythology of the Wunambal people of northwestern Australia, Ungud is a snake god who is sometimes male, sometimes female and sometimes androgynous. He is associated with rainbows by the fact Ungud may be a symbolic representation of rainbows and the fertility and erections of the tribe's shamans. In the beginning, when only the sky and the earth existed, Ungud lived underground as a giant python. Ungud is associated with earth and water and is credited with causing rain to fall and also has connections with monsoons. At night, Ungud and Wallanganda, the sky deity (associated with the Milky Way), created living beings through their dreams. The Mother Goddess Kunapipi who is also at times is called the Old Woman is connected to Ungud. The Rainbow Serpent made paths for her to walk around creation. Both The mother goddess and Rainbow serpent are the embodiment of creative powers that live within the earth. Through Ungud Dreaming itself into new forms natural species making it part of what life is based on becoming an archetype of life.

Only a few places in Australia is the Rainbow Serpent has any real impact outside of rites and precautions to avoid attacks that being tribes along the Northern coast which it does affect how the tribes organize socially

== See also ==
- Dhakhan
- Galeru
