= Mangar =

Mangar may refer to:

- Mangar (fish), a species of fish native to the Middle East
- Mangar Bani, an archaeological site and hill forest in Faridabad district, Haryana, India
- Mangar people, an ethnic group of Nepal
- Mangar language (Nepal), a Sino-Tibetan language of Nepal
- Mangar language (Nigeria), a variety of the Ron language of Nigeria
- An evil wizard in Bard's Tale (1985), a computer game series
- Mangar International Limited, a manufacturer of patient lifting and handling equipment, founded by David Garman

== See also ==
- Mangar-kunjer-kunja, a deity in the Australian aboriginal mythology of the Aranda people
