= Tityrus =

Tityrus may refer to:

- Tityrus, the shepherd in Virgil's Eclogues, or Virgil himself
- Tityrus, a pseudonym used by Edmund Spenser for Geoffrey Chaucer in The Shepheardes Calender
- Tityrus, the pseudonym of J.A.H. Catton, editor of the Athletic News
- Tityrus, an alternative name for the Musimon, an ovine beast in Medieval heraldry and Greek legend
- Tityrus, a legendary Aetolian man and father of a woman named Helen
- Tityrus, a taxonomic synonym for the plant genus Narcissus
