= Isles of Sea and Sky =

2024 puzzle video game

- Developer: Cicada Games
- Publishers: Cicada Games; Gamera Games
- Producer: Dan Collver
- Designer: Jason Newman
- Programmer: Jason Newman
- Artist: Jason Newman
- Composer: Craig Collver
- Engine: GameMaker
- Platform: Windows
- Release: 22 May 2024
- Genre: Puzzle
- Mode: Single-player

Isles of Sea and Sky is a 2024 puzzle video game. The player explores a series of islands and is presented with block-pushing puzzles in the style of Sokoban. The game is nonlinear and uses an open world setting: the player can explore the world and approach puzzles in an open-ended order, and puzzles are not necessarily solvable when the player first encounters them, requiring abilities and tools unlocked later. Developed by three-person indie studio Cicada Games and published by Gamera Games, the game was first funded via Kickstarter in 2020 before being released for Windows in May 2024.

The game received generally favorable reviews. Reviewers praised its puzzle design, and compared its structure to Metroid and The Witness. The open world aspects, and particularly the gating of certain puzzles behind progression milestones, received mixed feedback. The visual style was described as reminiscent of Game Boy Color games, in particular The Legend of Zelda: Link's Awakening, and drew positive feedback. The game was a finalist for "Excellence in Design" at the 2024 Independent Games Festival, and was listed by multiple publications as one of the best puzzle games of 2024.

== Gameplay ==
The player character pushes a block. Various puzzles are on the current screen, and collected and uncollected items can be seen.

Isles of Sea and Sky is a single-player block-pushing puzzle game in the style of Sokoban. Similarly to Sokoban, the player solves puzzles by pushing items into specific locations. The items to be pushed vary throughout the game, such as inert blocks or creatures that roll when pushed, and the target locations are holes in the ground. However, it is an open world game where the player can approach puzzles in any order, and in particular, the player does not necessarily have the tools to solve any given puzzle when first encountering it, with traversal and puzzles gated behind items in the style of Metroid. Collectible stars are the main measurement of progression, as they grant access to new areas and islands. Within islands, collectible metals and orbs unlock certain puzzles. For example, on one island, collecting enough orbs causes boulders that normally block the player to change into golems that can be pushed. Other items unlock abilities or traversal methods, such as diving fins that allow the player to traverse submerged paths.

The game is presented in top-down 2D. The player character moves through a series of discrete screens, and reaching the edge of a screen causes a transition to the next screen. Most screens have multiple puzzles. There are controls for moving in four directions, to undo the last move, and to reset the current screen. Interacting with in-game elements is performed by pushing them as there are intentionally no dedicated controls for that purpose. The game does not have instructions or tutorials, instead opting to have the player discover mechanics via trial and error. It also lacks text or dialogue.

The player character begins the game washed ashore on an island with no memories. The main quest involves unlocking a large door by obtaining the powers of four island guardians. To this end, they explore a series of islands. There are four main islands, with one themed around each of earth, water, fire, and air. Each has distinct mechanics based on its corresponding element, such as slippery ice, flowing water, or volcanic heat.

== Development and release ==
Isles of Sea and Sky was developed by Cicada Games, an indie studio consisting of designer, programmer, and artist Jason Newman, producer Dan Collver, and composer Craig Collver. Newman had previously developed Triga (2022), but Isles of Sea and Sky was his first large commercial venture. The game was first funded in a 2020 crowdfunding campaign on Kickstarter. Until 2023, the game's name was Akurra, referencing the Akurra mythology of the Aboriginal South Australians; Newman changed it to Isles of Sea and Sky after concluding that the original name was culturally insensitive. Before its release, the game was showcased at BitSummit 2023 and the 2024 Independent Games Festival. It was published by Cicada Games and Gamera Games, and was released on 22 May 2024 for Windows.

Isles of Sea and Sky was made in the GameMaker engine. According to Newman, the game started out as a clone of Chip's Challenge, with the island-based structure being added later as a way to connect the puzzles with an overworld. Newman cited Super Metroid and Mega Man Legends as inspiration for the structure, and The Legend of Zelda: Oracle of Seasons and Oracle of Ages as inspiration for the visual style.

A content update titled the "Mysterious Update" was released on 30 July 2025, adding puzzles combining mechanics from the islands, metapuzzles, and a new island. A port for Nintendo Switch and Nintendo Switch 2 was announced on 30 September 2026, with a release date of 8 October 2026.

== Reception ==
Reception

Aggregate score
Aggregator	Score
Metacritic	85/100

Review scores
Publication	Score
Edge	8/10
Touch Arcade	5/5
Vandal	8/10

Isles of Sea and Sky received "generally favorable" reviews according to review aggregator Metacritic.

The puzzle design was praised. Vandal's Juan Rubio described solving the puzzles as enjoyable. Katharine Castle of Eurogamer described the game as "exceedingly good", complimenting its layering of puzzle mechanics. Writing for Rock Paper Shotgun, Sin Vega described it as "the only sokoban game I've ever enjoyed", owing to a perceived lack of frustration. Reviewer Mikhail Madnani of Touch Arcade cited the open structure as making the game approachable despite its depth.

Polygon's reviewer Grayson Morley described an open world Sokoban-like game as inherently dissonant, and found the experience of not knowing whether they had the tools available to solve a puzzle frustrating. Nevertheless, Morley described the game as making them reflect on the philosophy of moving on from a challenge. Similarly, Rubio commented that not knowing if a puzzle was solvable was confusing and described traversing the world looking for a puzzle to solve as frustrating. Jenni Lada of Siliconera and Castle of Eurogamer compared the lack of tutorials and structure of discovery to The Witness.

Reviewers complimented the art and visual style. Rubio described the game as capturing the Game Boy Color's aesthetic and successfully using an 8-bit color palette. Writing for Digital Trends, Giovanni Colantonio called it "a pixel-perfect homage to Link's Awakening" and cited the game's evocation of nostalgia and sense of exploration. Edge magazine complimented the contributions of the puzzle design and graphic style to a sense of adventure, calling it "a bona fide adventure" and an "enveloping puzzle space". Rebekah Valentine of Kotaku complimented "the way it tells a story entirely wordlessly through those puzzles".

Isles of Sea and Sky was a finalist for "Excellence in Design" at the 2024 Independent Games Festival, and was shortlisted for best game at the 2024 GameMaker Awards. Shacknews, Digital Trends, GamesRadar, and Le Monde listed it among the best puzzle games of 2024.
