= Ipilja-ipilja =

Giant gecko in Australian Aboriginal mythology

The ipilja-ipilja, or ipilya, is a giant gecko in the mythology of the Anindilyakwa people of Australia. He is considered to be the creator of rain and thunder.

The ipilja-ipilja lives with his family, all giant geckos, in the Numarika swamp at the mouth of the Angoroko River of Groote Eylandt. The swamp is considered sacred, and it is believed that anyone who drinks water from the swamp will die. Because of this, the ipilja-ipilja is greatly feared. The wife of the ipilja-ipilja is called the guruina, and together they have a single child.

The geckos are all "highly colored," with the ipilja-ipilja being about a hundred feet long and adorned with long hair and whiskers. At the beginning of the monsoon season, the ipilja-ipilja eats the grasses on the edge of the swamp and drinks a large quantity of the swamp water. He then spews the mixture into the sky. The water turns into clouds, and the grass binds the clouds together. The ipilja-ipilja, pleased with his efforts, lets out a roar that becomes thunder. Thus, thunderstorms are created. After the monsoon season, the ipilja-ipilja retires into the swamp. There, except to punishing intruders in his swamp, the ipilja-ipilja rests until the arrival of the next monsoon season.

Similar stories can be found on Melville Island and Bathurst Island, where colorful lizards known as the maratji are said to guard their waterholes. Whenever they are being intruded upon, the annoyed maratji will cause floods and thunderstorms. The stories of the ipilja-ipilja and maratji are similar with that of the Rainbow Serpent, a deity popular on the Australian mainland but are not found on Groote Eylandt or Melville Island. It is thought that the myth of the ipilja-ipilja serves as a local replacement for the Rainbow Serpent.

Guernea ipilya, an amphipod discovered in the Great Barrier Reef, is named after the ipilja-ipilja.

== Bibliography ==
- Buchler, Ira R. (1978). The Rainbow Serpent: A Chromatic Piece. The Hague: Mouton. ISBN 978-90-279-7680-2. OCLC 561922860.
- Mountford, Charles Pearcy (1958). The Tiwi: Their Art, Myth, and Ceremony. London: Phoenix House. OCLC 3427317.
- Pianka, Eric R.; Vitt, Laurie J. (2003). Lizards: Windows to the Evolution of Diversity. Berkeley: University of California Press. ISBN 978-0-520-24847-2. OCLC 47791058.
- Thomas, James Darwin; Barnard, J. L. (1991). "Guernea ipilya and G. yamminye, new species (Crustacea: Amphipoda: Dexaminidae), from the Great Barrier Reef, Australia". Memoirs of the Museum of Victoria. 52 (2). Museums Victoria: 299–310. doi:10.24199/j.mmv.1991.52.07. ISSN 0814-1827. Archived from the original (PDF) on 2021-08-21.
