= Malingee =

Spirit from Australian Aboriginal mythology

Malingee is a nocturnal malignant Australian Aboriginal spirit. In Aboriginal mythology, they prefer to avoid humans, but when provoked, they will slay mercilessly with a stone knife or axe. Malingees have knees of stone that knock together, making a scraping sound, and have eyes that smolder like the coals of a cold fire. These features were supposed to make it possible for humans to detect and avoid nearby Malingees.

== See also ==
- List of Australian Aboriginal deities
