= Ngarutjaranya =

Highest mountain in South Australia

- Location within South Australia

Highest point
- Elevation: 1,435 m (4,708 ft)AHD
- Prominence: South Australia's highest mountain
- Coordinates: 26°19′13″S 131°44′38″E

Geography
- Location: Anangu Pitjantjatjara Yankunytjatjara; South Australia, Australia
- Parent range: Musgrave Ranges

Climbing
- Easiest route: Hike

Mount Woodroffe, also known as Ngarutjaranya (officially Mount Woodroffe/Ngarutjaranya), is a mountain in the Australian state of South Australia, located in the Anangu Pitjantjatjara Yankunytjatjara lands in the state's northwest. It is South Australia's highest peak, at 1,435 metres (4,708 ft).

== Cultural significance ==
The name of the mountain comes from the Pitjantjatjara language. In Pitjantjatjara mythology, the mountain embodies the mythological creature Ngintaka.

== Geography ==
Mount Woodroffe is located in the far northwest of South Australia, in the Musgrave Ranges. The mountain range rises some 700–800 metres from the surrounding plains and comprises massifs of granite and gneiss.

== History ==
William Ernest Giles was the first European man to pass through the area and camped to the south of Woodroffe on September 7, 1873. William Christie Gosse had previously named it Mt Woodroffe on July 20 that same year. Woodroffe was named after George Woodroffe Goyder, Surveyor-General of South Australia and an early Australian explorer.

In the 1960s, Mount Woodroffe was considered as a potential site for the proposed Anglo-Australian Telescope (AAT). It lost out due to its remoteness compared to Siding Spring in New South Wales, where the AAT sits today amongst other astronomical observatories.

== Access ==
Access is limited as a permit is required to enter the Anangu Pitjantjatjara lands. As of October 2024, it is confirmed Mount Woodroffe cannot be climbed anymore as no more permits to climb it are issued by the APY lands (Aṉangu Pitjantjatjara Yankunytjatjara).

== See also ==
- List of mountains in Australia
