= Ngariman =

In Karajarri mythology, Ngariman is a quoll-man who killed the Bagadjimbiri, two dingo spirits and sons of Dilga, an earth goddess. In revenge, she drowned Ngariman with her milk by flooding the cavern where he killed her sons.

== Sources ==
- Piddington, Ralph (1932) "Karadjeri Initiation" in Oceana, Volume 3, Issue 1, September 1932, Pages 46-87
- "Bagadjimbiri" A Dictionary of World Mythology: 1St American Ed by Arthur Cotterell. Oxford University Press, 1980. pp. 270-271

== See also ==
- Kinie Ger
