= Bila (sun) =

Personification of the Sun among the Adnyamathanha people

Bila (also occasionally rendered Belah) is the personification of the Sun among the Adnyamathanha people. She is a solar goddess, as befitting the general trends among Australian aboriginal peoples, which largely perceive the Sun as female.

Bila is said to be a cannibal, roasting her victims over a fire, the origin of sunlight. To do this, she sent black and red dogs to drag her victims, resulting even in an entire village being slaughtered. In a myth, the Lizard Men Kudnu ("Goanna") and Muda ("gecko") were appalled by these acts and attacked, prompting her to flee and cast the world in darkness. He then used a boomerang, catching her and making her move in a slow arc across the sky as it returned, it illuminating the world. For this act of heroism, lizards like goannas and geckos are respected by the Adnyamathanha.

A similar, albeit likely unrelated, myth occurs in Woodlark Island.

== See also ==
- List of solar deities
