= Bluetongue Lizard =

Figure of some Indigenous Australian mythology

Bluetongue Lizard is an old man in the Australian Aboriginal mythology of the Warlpiri people. He is a trickster and a powerful sorcerer, as well. The myth involving him is the wellspring of the Warlpiri fire ceremonies. He is often regarded as a deity, but this notion is not exactly true.

== Story ==
Bluetongue Lizard had two sons, and the three of them camped in the Place of Fire, which was known as Warlukurlangu. He pretended he was blind so his sons would hunt for him. However, once they were gone, he would leave to hunt his own food, which he ate on the spot. The place he went hunting was Ngama, also known as the Cave of the Rainbow Snake. There, he gained his sorcery skills. One day, the two sons went hunting and killed a kangaroo, which they presented to their father to eat. The two sons did not know this kangaroo was sacred and used to speak to Bluetongue Lizard, telling him secrets. Upon learning of the kangaroo's slaying, Bluetongue Lizard was filled with rage and summoned a magic fire, sending it after his sons. The fire followed them wherever they went. It would die down at night, but start up again in the morning, driving Bluetongue Lizard's sons around all of the Tjukurrpa. Finally, the sons stopped at the Ngarra salt lake and drowned there, too fatigued to go on.

== Effect ==
The Warlpiri people recapture the spirit of Bluetongue Lizard with dramatic fire ceremonies that involve a young male dancer emerging from total darkness into the glow of a ceremonial fire. The dancer selected moves carefully and willingly and then kneels by the fire, shaking his shoulders. He takes brushes from the fire and proceeds to scatter the embers over his back. The Warlpiri elders walk by the youth to coach him in the proper performance of the dance. The Ngarra is one of the most sacred sites of the Warlpiri – so sacred, only men are permitted to go there.

== See also ==
- Rainbow Serpent
