= Bakara Well Cave =

Cave in South Australia

- Location within South Australia Location within Australia
- Location: Murray and Mallee, South Australia, Australia
- Coordinates: 34°36′41″S 139°51′50″E
- Elevation: 60 metres (197 ft)
- Discovery: 1971
- Geology: Limestone

Bakara Well Cave is a limestone doline cave lying approximately 120 kilometres (75 mi) east-northeast from Adelaide in the District Council of Loxton Waikerie in the Murray and Mallee region of South Australia.

The cave consists of a flat-roofed chamber of standing height with short, low tunnels branching off it.

== Exploration ==
Following Wayne Goedecke’s discovery of the cave in 1971, members of the Cave Exploration Group of South Australia completed surveying and mapping in 1976.

== Indigenous legends ==
In a 2024 article for Caves Australia, Karl Brandt proposed the Bakara Well Cave as the lair of Chinny-kinik, the dreaded cannibal giant from Australian Aboriginal mythology.
