= Minawara and Multultu =

Figures in Australian Aboriginal mythology

In Aboriginal mythology, Minawara and Multultu were kangaroo-men and the legendary ancestors of the Nambutji tribe. The two were given powers by Dreamtime; Minawara the power to change fate and Multultu the power to manipulate time. They are able to combine themselves and become an entity called Minultu with the power to change the order of the world.

== Mythology ==
Minawara and Multultu lived peacefully in their village until another member of their tribe violated a sacred oath. This angered the Deities and caused them to send a large flood to the village. The tribe was swept away, and the harshness of the waters killed many of them. Eventually, the tides stopped. Minawara and Multultu survived the disaster.

With their village destroyed, the two began walking through the wreckage left behind. They walked for a long time without food or water to restore their energy. As they walked, the two began to lose their worldliness. Their noses stopped working, blocked by debris and sand. Their eyes could no longer see because they stopped blinking, afraid to fall asleep and wake up to another disaster. Their organs were destroyed, their bones turned to stone, and their skin became as rough as bark. However, none of these changes stopped them from continuing their journey.

Eventually, Minawara, the older and wiser of the pair, felt an instinct to cease their endless wandering. He stopped walking, embraced Multultu, and took his last breath, ending their journey. Minawara and Multultu suddenly found themselves in a void, a formless entity. The entity introduced itself as "Dreamtime" and offered them a choice: end their journey here or begin a new life as new, better, wiser, and stronger versions of themselves. The two took the latter offer, asking for the strength to protect one another. Dreamtime granted them this power, finding them worthy.

Minawara was given the ability to alter fate and Multultu the power to manipulate time. Minawara used his powers to create a force that allowed him to tie himself with Multultu, becoming Minultu, an entity so powerful even Dreamtime was shaken by its presence. Minultu transcends all thought and cannot be explained with logic. It is depicted as a kangaroo with a human body, possessing black and white wings (although some also describe them as red and blue). Minultu is described as a wise, decisive, and responsible being.

With the power to overturn the order of the world, Minawara and Multultu stand on the side of good. They are called both the Guardian of Dreamtime and the Guide to the Dreamtime.
