= Borda (legendary creature) =

Emilia-Romagna legendary creature

The Borda is a legendary creature that belongs to the culture of the Emilia-Romagna and other areas of the Po Valley in Italy.

It is a sort of witch that appears, blindfolded and horrible, both at night and on foggy days and kills anyone who has the misfortune to meet her. It is a personification of the fear related to swamps and marshlands, and to ponds and canals, invoked by adults to scare children and keep them away from such potentially dangerous places.

== Description ==
The Borda, known by this name especially in Modenese, is also known as Bourda in Bolognese, Bùrda in Ferrarese, Bûrda or Burdâna in Emilian. The masculine form takes the name of Bordón in Parma, Bordö or Bordoeu in Milan (meaning Ogre), Bordò in Bormiese (with a generally derogatory connotation). In Milanese, as well as in the dialects Cremasco and Bormiese, the word borda means fog. In Bergamasque the name has the meaning fog as well as that of paper mask.

Some scholars of local folklore trace the etymology of the term Borda to the root "bor-" which can be traced back to Borvo, of Celtic mythology, who presided over thermal and spring waters, and would be found, in a vast area united by an ancient Celtic presence, in toponyms and terms related to the water element. Examples being: the river Bormida, Spa resorts such as Bormio, Bourbon-Lancy, Bourbon-l'Archambault, words in French such as brouillard and brume (meaning fog) or bourbe (slime).

== Origin and diffusion of the myth ==
Italian

Ninna nanna, la Borda
lega i bei bambini con una corda.
Con una corda e con una cordicella,
lega i bei bambini e poi li stringe,
con una corda e con un legaccio,
lega i bei bambini e poi li ammazza.

Emilian-Romagnol

Ninàn, ninàn, la Borda
la liga i bei babèn cun una côrda.
Cun una côrda e cun una curdella,
la liga i bei babèn pu la i asserra,
cun una côrda e cun una ligazza,
la liga i bei babèn pu la i amazza.

English

Lullaby, the Borda
binds beautiful children with a rope.
With a rope and a cord,
binds the beautiful children and then holds them,
with a rope and a string,
binds the beautiful children and then kills them.

Some lullabies in Romagnol are dedicated to the Borda, which kills children who are not good and do not want to sleep by strangling them with a lasso or a rope. Some scholars point out that this peculiar way of killing can be traced back to the human sacrifices practiced in ancient Germanic cults and would be known by the discovery, in some Danish and British peat bogs, of bodies of people suffocated with a rope tied around their neck and then drowned, such as the Tollund Man.

The legend of Borda is central to the novel Mal'aria by Eraldo Baldini, from which the Mal'aria TV miniseries was created.

== See also ==
- Marabbecca
- Grindylow
