= Tjinimin =

In Murrinh-Patha mythology, Tjinimin is the ancestor of the Australian peoples. He is associated with the bat and with Kunmanggur the rainbow serpent.

One story of Tjinimin tells of an argument between him and the Great Rainbow Serpent where Tjinimin wanted to have sex with Great Rainbow Serpent's consorts, the Green Parrot-Girls. Upon losing, Tjinimin hung upside down in a tree and admired the stars, vowing to never have sex again. Soon after, his nose falls off, supposedly explaining to the native culture why bats in the region have such short noses.
