= Wagyl =

Deity of the Noongar people

- Giver of life, or sustenance for life, to the people who are the custodians of its land
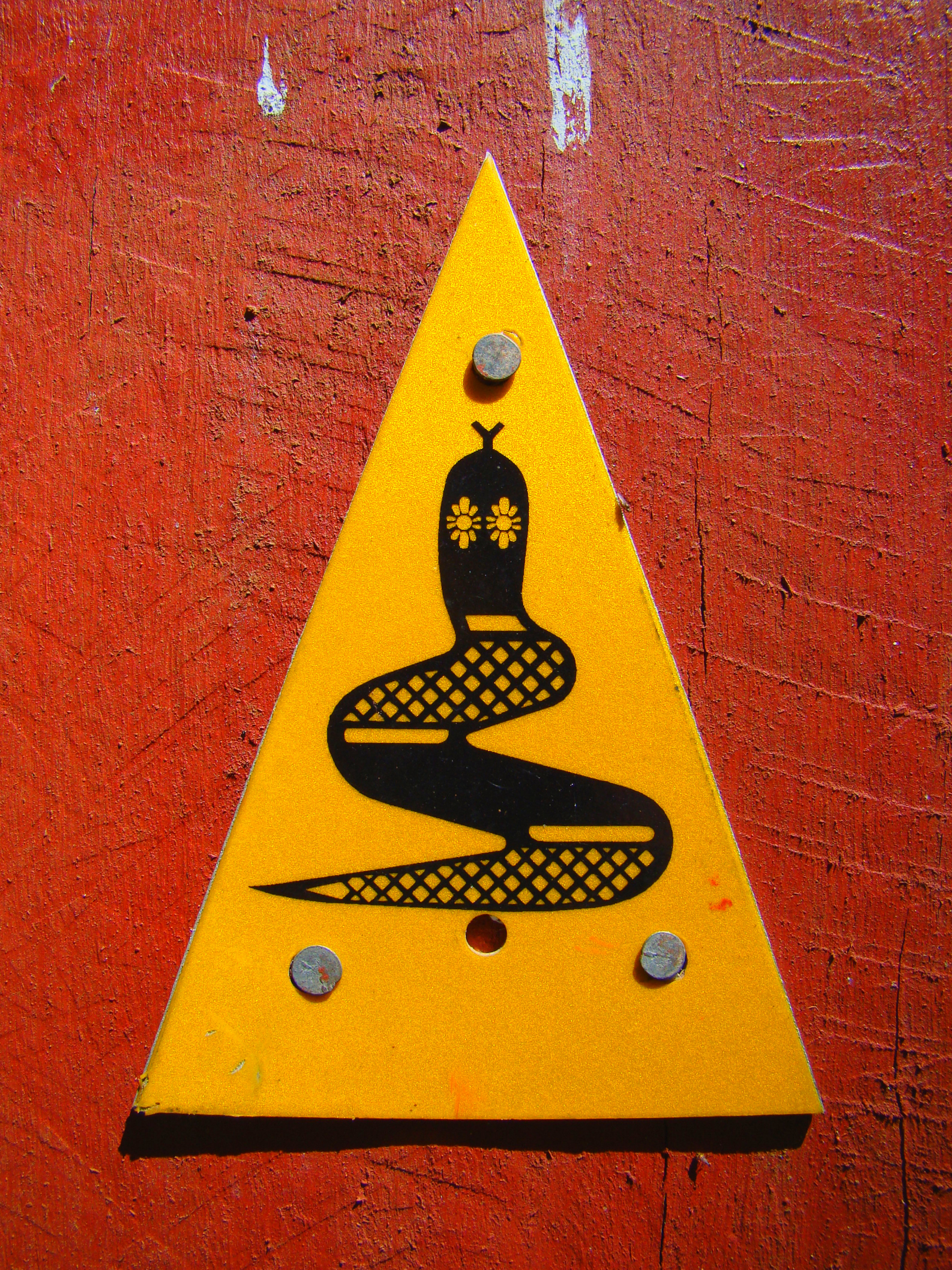
- A track marker from the Bibbulmun Track featuring a symbol of the Wagyl
- Other names: Waugal; Waagal
- Gender: Male; Female
- Region: Southwest Western Australia
- Ethnic group: Noongar

Equivalents
- Australian Aboriginal: Rainbow Serpent

The Wagyl (also written Waugal, Waagal, and variants) is the Noongar manifestation of the Rainbow Serpent in Australian Aboriginal religion and mythology, from the culture based around the south-west of Western Australia. The Noongar describe the Wagyl as a snakelike Dreaming creature responsible for the creation of the Swan and Canning rivers and other waterways and landforms around present day Perth and the south-west of Western Australia.

The Wagyl stories may represent the survival in oral tradition of extinct Australian megafauna, as there was a python-like snake, Wonambi naracoortensis, with a length of five to six metres (16 to 20 ft).

== Name ==
Due to the Noongar language having several dialects, the Wagyl is referred to by different groups by different names. Varieties include Waugal, Waagal, Wargyl, Waakal, Waakle, Woggal, Wogal, Waagle, Warrgul and Warkal. In the Wiilman Noongar dialect, the Wagyl is called the Ngunnunguddy Gnuditj (meaning 'hairy-faced snake').

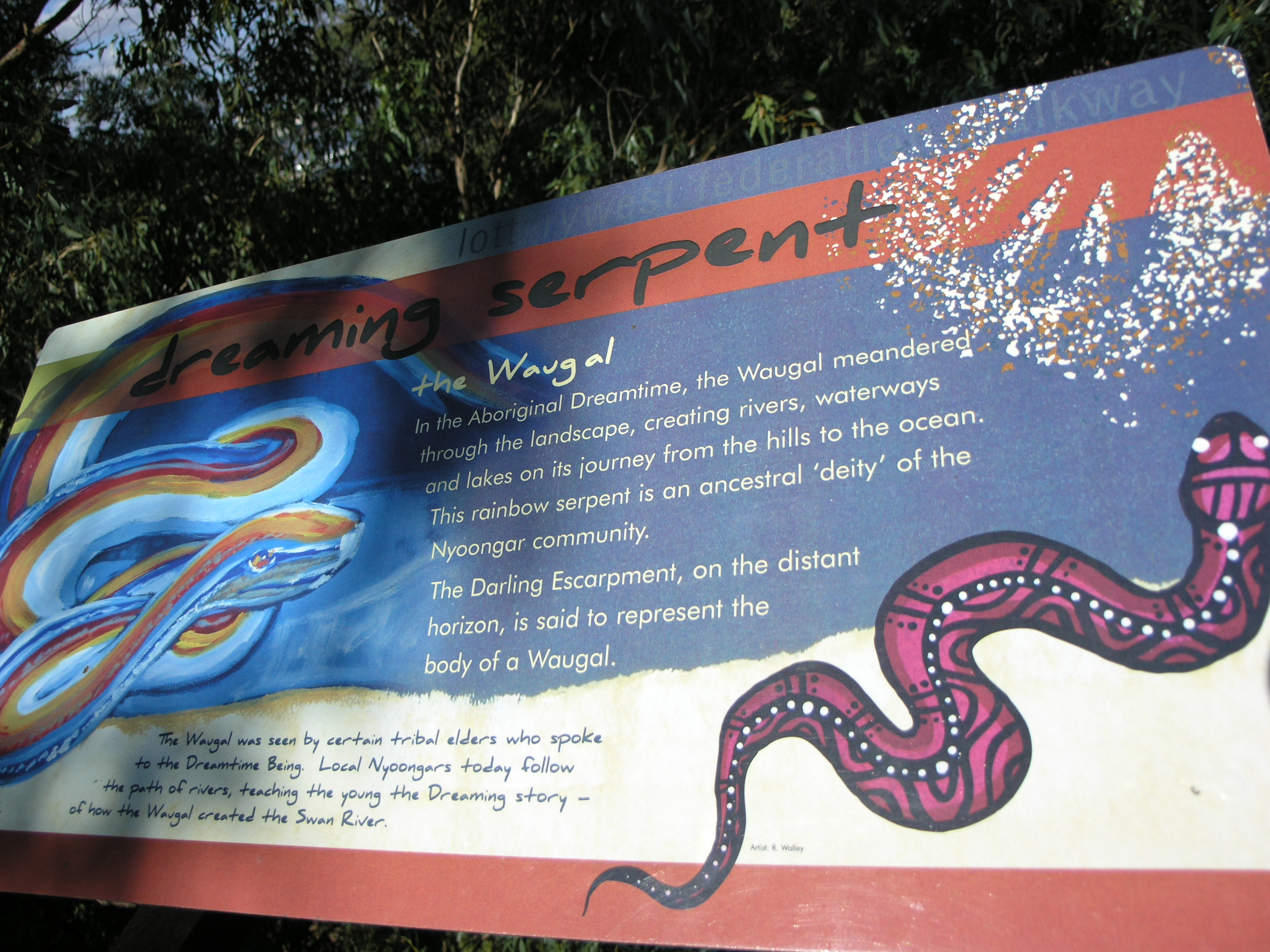
A sign depicting the Wagyl at Kings Park, Perth

== Mythology ==
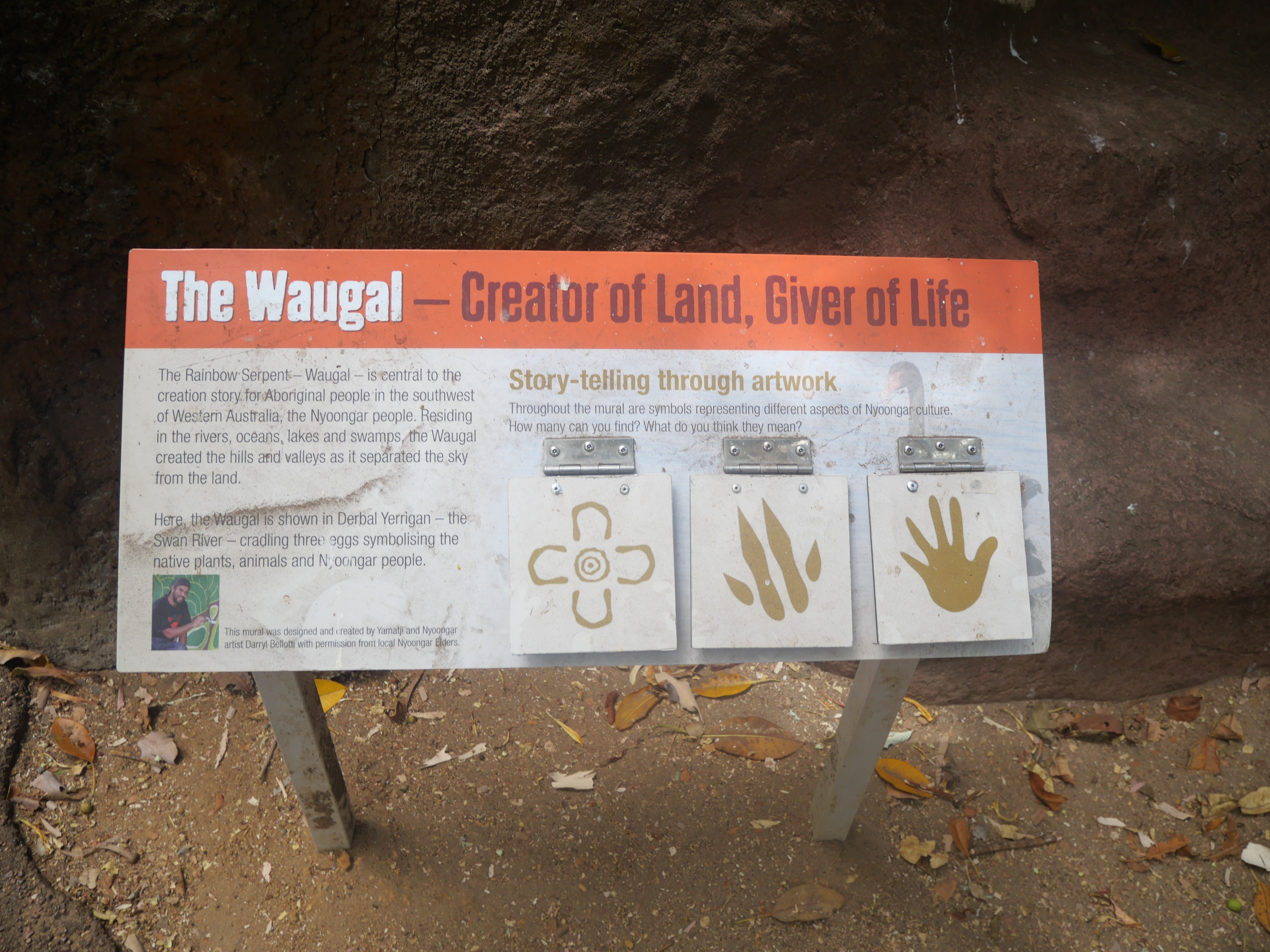
Information on the Wagyl at Perth Zoo

In Noongar mythology, stories about the Wagyl vary among the 14 different Noongar groups. Some groups state that the Wagyl is the ruler of the Earth and sky, and that it inhabits water sources. In contrast, others say it is simply the creator and maintainer of fresh water sources. However, in all Noongar groups it is a central figure and responsible for giving life or sustenance for life to the people who are the custodians of its land.

The Wagyl is said to be responsible for shaping and creating the Swan River, creating the sharp bends at Belmont and Maylands, as well as the Canning River. When it reached the area around Fremantle, it fought with a crocodile and used its tail to separate the salt and fresh water of the ocean and river from each other. The Wagyl is also said to have rested at the base of Mount Eliza in Perth, which is seen as a sacred site. Furthermore, the Wagyl has significant connection to the Busselton wetlands.

Many local landscape features between the Porongarups and off the coast of Fremantle are said to have been created by the Wagyl. Indeed, porongarup means 'spirit gathering place', from borong, 'spirit', gar, 'gathering' and up, 'place'. The Wagyl was delegated to protect the rivers, lakes, springs and the wildlife, and Wagyl sacred sites tend to be natural suntraps, located beside bodies of water. In turn, the Noongar people were appointed by the Wagyl as the guardians of the land, and the Wagyl was seen by certain tribal elders who spoke to the dreamtime being.

The Darling Scarp is said to represent the body of the Wagyl, which meandered over the land creating the curves and contours of the hills and gullies. The being is strongly associated with rivers, lakes like Galup, and is supposed still to reside deep beneath springs. As the Wagyl slithered over the land, his track shaped the sand dunes, his body scoured out the course of the rivers; where he occasionally stopped for a rest, he created bays and lakes. Piles of rocks are said to be his droppings, and such sites are considered sacred. As he moved, his scales scraped off and became the forests and woodlands of the region.

During a serious drought, Noongar elders ventured to the coast of the Indian Ocean to pray to the Wagyl to end the drought. The Wagyl then came out of the ocean and created the Peel inlet where she gave birth to her young. After they matured, they went east from the inlet and formed the Serpentine, Murray and Harvey rivers. However the Wagyl went out to look for her young and created Lake Clifton and Lake Preston. Thinking they went south, it ventured south and created the flat land around the Leschenault Estuary at Australind. Meanwhile, the young eventually starved and eventually dissolved into water and resupplied underground water reservoirs. This then ended the drought.

Due to its deep association with the water, it is said that when the water is murky and dark the Wagyl was swimming and that one shouldn't swim in that water.

=== Specific variations ===
Lands of the Noongar people

==== Ballardong people ====
The Ballardong people also believe the Wagyl is the creator of the rivers, lakes and swamps around York, where it travelled along the Avon River to Guildford, going also through Toodyay valley. In the Dreamtime story of Wave Rock, the Ballardong people believe that the Wagyl shaped the rock's formation. Another rock believed by the Ballardong to have been shaped by the Wagyl is Boyagin Rock, where it is seen as the winter home, the last resting place of the Wagyl.

==== Mooro people ====
In the Mooro clan's Karda myth, the Wagyl prevents crocodile from entering the Swan River after his tail was torn off by shark, which eventually formed Rottnest and Garden Island. Following this, the crocodile was told by the Wagyl to go back to Two Rocks and talk with yonga ('kangaroo') and bibyur ('scrub turkey').

In the Charnok Woman myth, the Charnok Woman collects spirit children following the path created by the Wagyl across a valley created by the Wagyl and is known as the Swan River. The path led her north to where the Wagyl was creating lakes.

In the Mooro myth of two lost boys, two boys were brought to Mindarrie by two tribal elders to learn the law. After the elders went out to hunt, the boys ventured off to discover what had caused a loud noise, only to find the Indian Ocean. Thirsty, they drank from the water to find it was salty. Figuring the water further out was sweeter, they ventured out into the water only to be swallowed up by the Wagyl. The Wagyl then ventured back to the coast where it spat the boys out as two tuart trees.

==== Wiilman people ====
For the Wiilman people, the Wagyl travelled from the north to Collie, where it created hills and rivers along the way. It then went to Bunbury and Australind where it formed the Leschenault Estuary. It then came back to Collie via the Collie River to Minninup pool. He then gave to the Wiilman people law and language before the Wiilmans danced and sang for the Wagyl as a farewell. The Wagyl then went back to Minninup pool which is its resting place to the Wiilman people. They also believe that if its resting place is harmed, all the water in the world would dry up.

=== Post-European settlement ===
One of the earliest description of the Wagyl by European settlers was by Francis Armstrong of the Perth Gazette in 1836, where he described stones believed by the Noongars to be eggs of the Wagyl.

When the Government of Western Australia wanted to redevelop land around the Old Swan Brewery in the 1980s, conflicting attitudes around the Wagyl arose. The area is known as Goonininup in Noongar, and is seen in some stories as a resting point of the Wagyl.

== Characteristics ==
The Wagyl is often characterised as being green and smokish grey in colour, while also blending into the ocean. It is also characterised as being either female or male. Like the Rainbow serpent, it is depicted as a snake or serpent.

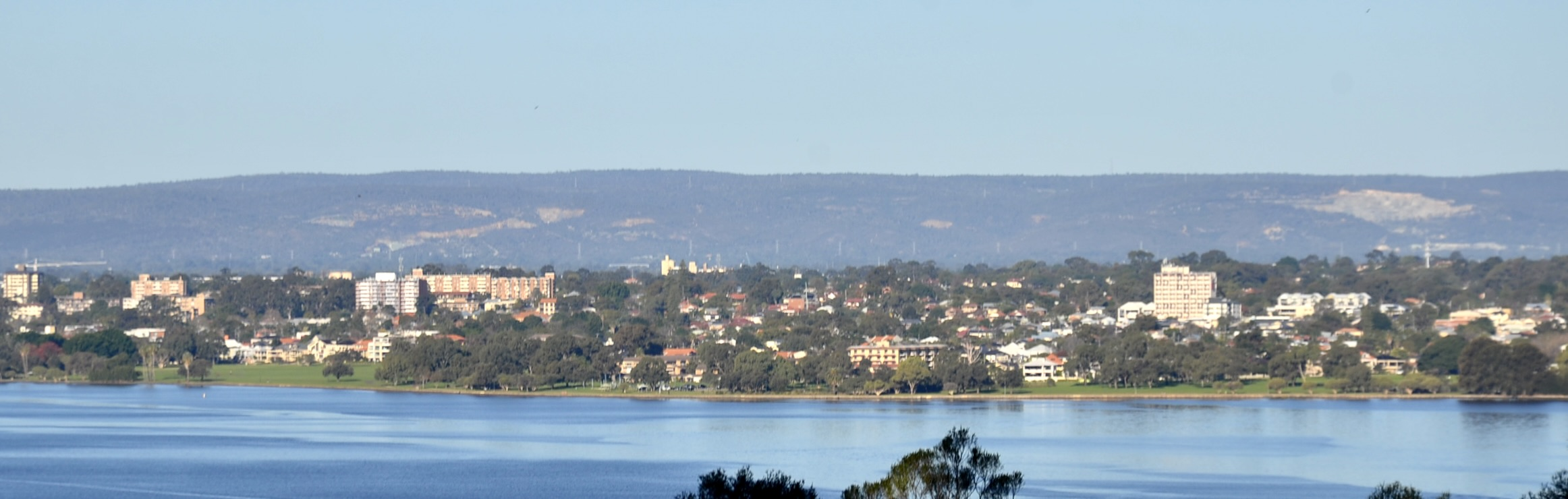
The Darling Scarp as seen from Kings Park. It is seen as being the body of the Wagyl.

== Influence on modern culture ==
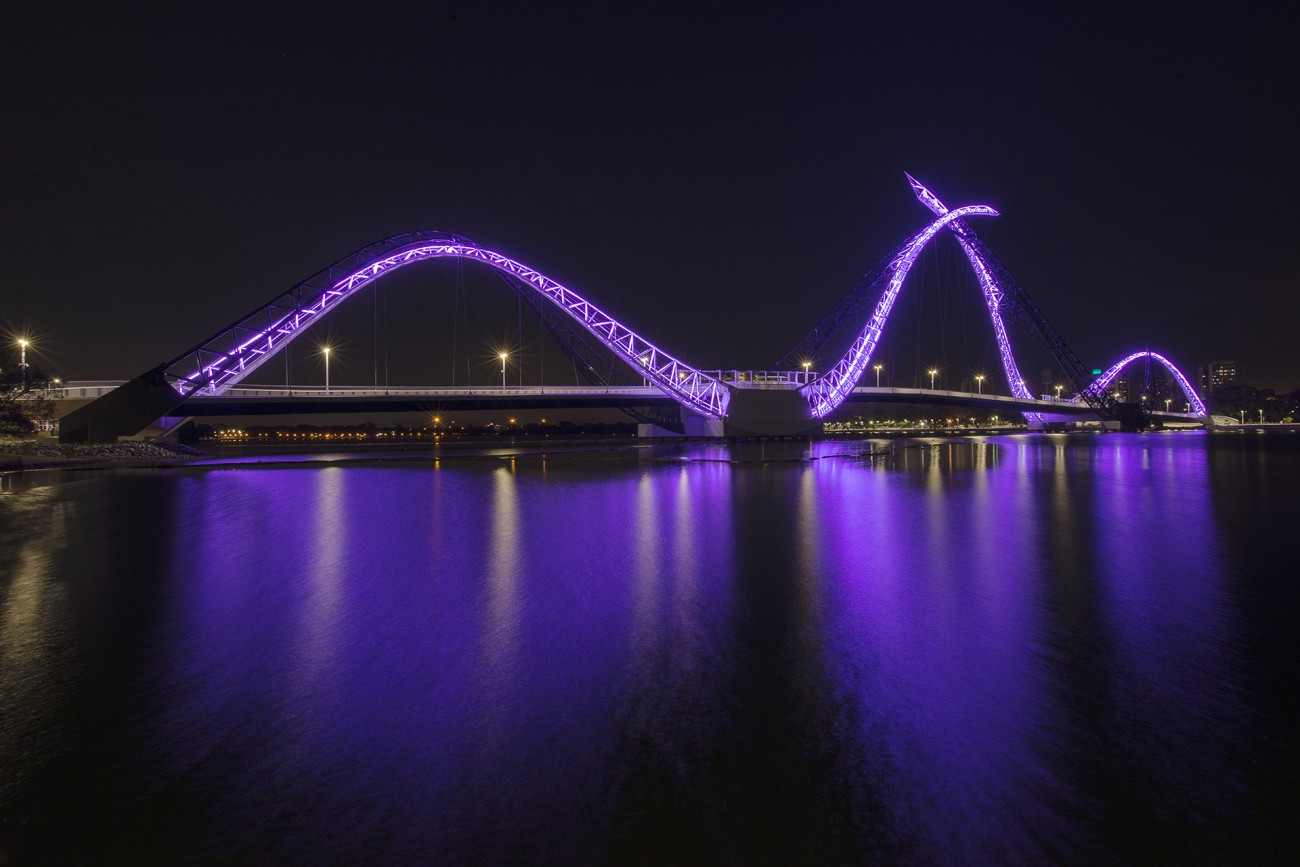
Matagarup bridge during Queen Elizabeth II's Platinum Jubilee

The Wagyl is depicted in the 1982 play Kullark by Jack Davis. The design of Matagarup Bridge in Perth over the Swan river is sometimes interpreted as representing the Wagyl.

The French one-man band Waagal takes its name from the serpent. Erwann Texier-Harth, the individual behind Waagal, incorporates the Aboriginal didgeridoo into many of his pieces.

=== In art ===
The Waugal Aboriginal Corporation is an Aboriginal art organisation based in Pinjarra. It received A$6,400, equivalent to A$9,480 in 2022, of funding to hold an exhibition at the Mandurah Performing Arts Centre as part of NAIDOC Week in 2006.

On 13 November 2020, a mural in Guildford depicting the Wagyl was unveiled by Western Australian Minister for Water Dave Kelly as part of the Splash of Colour program launched in 2017.

On 20 July 2023, a mural depicting the Wagyl was unveiled at a water pump station in Gosnells by the Minister for Water Simone McGurk. The project was led by Nerolie Bynder in partnership with the Water Corporation, and local schools and artists. The mural is also part of the Splash of Colour program launched in 2017. The murals were praised by Chris Tallentire.

== See also ==
- Aboriginal mythology
- Burlong Pool
- Bibbulmun Track
- Wirnpa

== General references ==
- Western Australia. Dept. of Conservation and Land Management (1998), Sharing the dreaming : Nyoongar Aboriginal stories of the dreaming : the wagyl, Dept. of Conservation & Land Management
- Flannery, Tim (2002) The Future Eaters: an Ecological History of the Australian Lands and People ISBN 0-8021-3943-4
