= Mann Ranges =

Mountain range in South Australia and the Northern Territory

- Location within Australia

Highest point
- Elevation: 1,050 m (3,440 ft)
- Coordinates: 26°03′42″S 130°07′21″E

Geography
- Location: Central Australia

The Mann Ranges are a mountain range in central Australia. It is located in the far northwest of South Australia, with a small section running over the border into the Northern Territory. It is part of the geological region known as the Musgrave Block, which also includes the Petermann and Musgrave Ranges. Mountains in this region were formed in the Petermann Orogeny (600–550 million years ago).

This area is part of the traditional country of the Pitjantjatjara nation. They associate it with the Dreaming of Wati Ngiṉṯaka, a major creation spirit. He is said to have created the landforms while travelling through the area in the Dreamtime, and his route forms a network of songlines that are spiritually important to native people. The largest communities in the area are Kaṉpi and Nyapaṟi.

The first European person to visit the area was William Gosse in 1873. With the help of local Aboriginal people, Gosse and his team explored the Mann Ranges after seeing the range from the top of Uluṟu. From the Mann Ranges, he went west to the Tomkinson Ranges, but turned back rather than trying to cross the Great Victoria Desert. He came back to the Mann Ranges and then went eastward to the Musgrave Ranges.
