= Dirawong =

Creature of Australian Aboriginal mythology

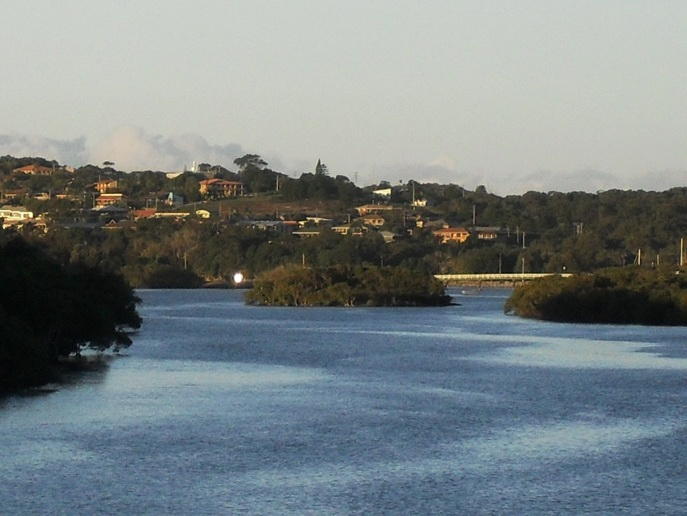
Snake Island in the middle of the river; on the right is Pelican Island and in the background is Goanna Headland.

In Australian Aboriginal mythology (specifically Bundjalung, from the northern New South Wales coast and South-East Queensland) Dirawong is a goanna Ancestral Being who taught humans how to live on the land, as well as important ceremonies and rituals. Dirawong is known as a benevolent protector of its people from the Rainbow Serpent. Dirawong's gender is ambiguous.

Dirawong and the Rainbow Serpent together created parts of the Richmond River, Goanna Headland, Snake Island, and Pelican Island. In Aboriginal mythology, a deposit of red ochre on top of Goanna Headland is believed to have originated from the wound where the Rainbow Serpent bit Dirawong during the Dreaming.

Dirawong is also believed to have been transformed into, and still resides within, the Goanna Headland.

Dirawong is associated with rain, and there is a rain cave on Goanna Headland where the elders of the Bundjalung people went in the past to organise ceremonies for rain. Dirawong is also associated with birds and snakes.

== Dirawong and the Rainbow Serpent ==
Bundjalung oral literature tells of a fight between Dirawong and the Rainbow Serpent, which created the Bungawalbin River, the Evans River, Pelican Island, Snake Island, other islands in the Evans River, and also an island at an unknown location in the Pacific Ocean.

In the Bundjalung story, a weeum ("cleverman", "man of high degree of initiation" or "man with great powers") named Nyimbunji from the area known as Bungawalbin calls on Dirawong to help protect a yabbra (bird) from the Rainbow Serpent.

Dirawong chases the Rainbow Serpent from inland eastward towards the coast, forming parts of the Richmond River as they go. At Maniworkan (or the town of Woodburn, New South Wales) they leave the Richmond River and kept on going east. Halfway down the Evans River, Dirawong catches the Rainbow Serpent. The Rainbow Serpent turns around and bites Dirawong on the head. Dirawong then withdraws from the battle in order to eat some herbs to recover from the snakebite. A deposit of red ochre at Goanna Headland is said to originate from the wound where the Rainbow Serpent bit Dirawong.

Meanwhile, Rainbow Serpent reaches Evans Head. Dirawong is nowhere to be seen, so Rainbow Serpent decides to go back west. He then goes into the Evans River and coils himself around, creating Snake Island. As he turns, his body makes a larger island in the river, now known as Pelican Island.

When Rainbow Serpent spots Dirawong heading towards him, he quickly turns, and this time keeps going until he reaches Burraga (the Tasman Sea), Here he transforms himself into an island so Dirawong cannot recognise him.

When Dirawong reaches the coast at Evans Head, he lies down next to the coast, facing the Burraga, waiting for Rainbow Serpent to come back.

== See also ==
- List of Australian Aboriginal mythological figures
- Dirawong Reserve
