= Anjea =

Fertility goddess in Australian Aboriginal mythology

In Australian Aboriginal mythology, Anjea is a fertility goddess or spirit. People's souls reside within her in between their incarnations. She picks them up at their resting places in the sand, which are marked with twigs. The twigs are arranged in the ground so as to form a circle, and they are tied together at their tops, so that the resulting structure resembles a cone. The spirits are taken away for several years, but Anjea eventually creates new children from mud, and places them in the wombs of future mothers.
