= Thardid Jimbo =

Character in Australian Aboriginal mythology

Thardid Jimbo is a character in the Australian Aboriginal religion and mythology of the Ngarrindjeri people. He was a cannibal giant, ultimately defeated by the resourcefulness of the family of a hunter he had killed.

== See also ==
- Chinny-kinik, a cannibal giant from Australian Aboriginal mythology
