= Wambeen =

Evil god in Arrernte Australian Aboriginal mythology

Wambeen is an evil god of Australian Aboriginal mythology, specifically that of the Arrernte people. Known for his lightning hurling figure, like many other subjects of ancient tales, Wambeen prefers travelers for his victims. Said to come down to earth to smite wanderers, he was recognized only by his smell of evil.
