= Bagadjimbiri =

In Karajarri mythology, the Bagadjimbiri are two brothers and creator spirits. They arose from the ground as dingos and made water-holes, sex organs (from a mushroom and another fungus) for the androgynous first people, and invented circumcision. Taking human form, the Bagadjimbiri began an argument with Ngariman, a quoll-person. Ngariman was annoyed by the Bagadjimbiri's laughter. He killed the brothers underground, but was drowned by Dilga, their mother, who flooded the underground murder-spot with her milk, which also revived her sons. The Bagadjimbiri eventually turned into snakes and went to live in the sky as clouds.
