= Muscaliet =

Mythical animal

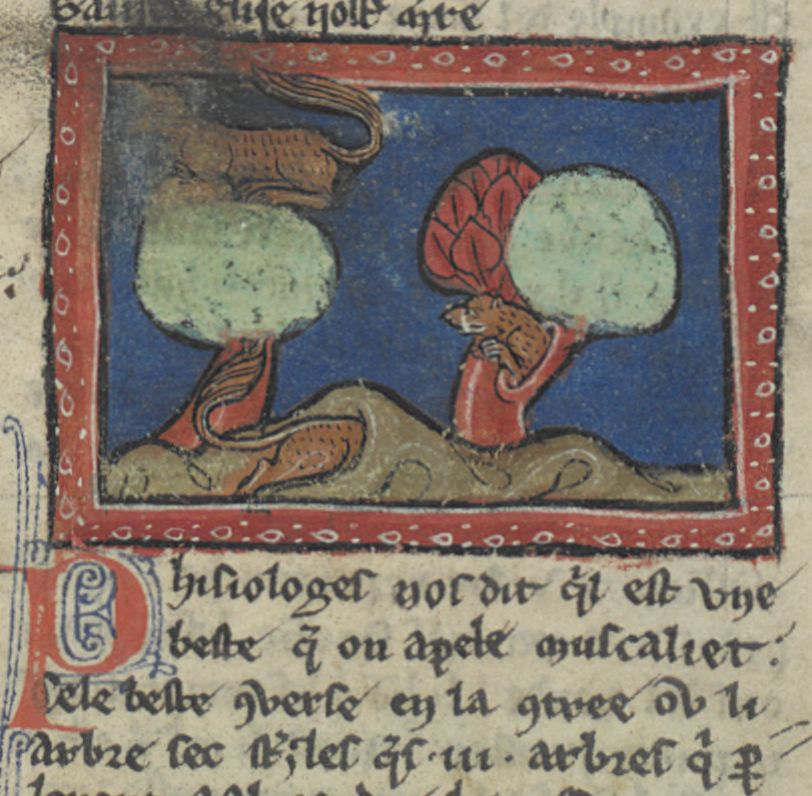
Illustration from de Beauvais's bestiary

The muscaliet is an animal from Medieval bestiaries. Pierre de Beauvais's 13th century Bestiaire includes a description of the animal, comparing it in various aspects to hares, squirrels, weasels, moles and pigs. De Beauvais also describes the muscaliet as nesting beneath the trees it climbs, damaging them through its body heat.
