= Dhakhan =

Ancestral spirit in Gubbi Gubbi mythology

In Gubbi Gubbi mythology, Dhakhan is an ancestral spirit. He is described as a giant serpent with the tail of a giant fish. He often appears as a rainbow, as this is his way of travelling between the watering holes which are his homes. He is also the creator of the snakes and serpents that live within the waterholes.

== See also ==
- Rainbow serpent
