= Kondole =

In the Australian Aboriginal mythology of the Ramindjeri subgroup of the Ngarrindjeri people, Kondole was a mean and rude man. One night, the performers during a ceremony needed someone to keep a fire going; Kondole was the only one with fire, and he hid in the bush. The men argued with him, and one got frustrated and threw a spear into Kondole's skull. All the men then turned into animals, including kangaroos, possums, fish and birds. Kondole became a whale and the hole in his head from the spear became his blowhole. Kondole was the first whale according to Aboriginal myth.

Ian Milne wrote the book Kondole the Whale based on this story in 1992
