= Wollunqua =

God in Warramunga Australian Aboriginal mythology

Wollunqua, also written Wollunka or Wollunkua, is a snake-god of rain and fertility in Australian Aboriginal mythology of the Warramunga people of the Northern Territory of Australia, a variation of the "Rainbow Serpent" present in the mythology of many other Aboriginal Australian peoples. The snake, which emerged from a watering hole called Kadjinara in the Murchison Ranges, is said to be many miles long. When speaking of the Wollunqua snake in public, the name urkulu nappaurinnia is used, because if they were to call it too often by its real name they would lose control and it would come out and devour them all. It can place the rainbow in the sky at will.

Wollunqua is a totemic ancestor of the Warramunga people, specifically the Uluuru moiety of the tribe. Amongst the Warramunga tribe, the snake totems are of considerable importance, the great majority of individuals of the Uluuru moiety belonging either to the Wollunqua, Thalaualla (black snake), or Tjudia (deaf adder) totems; but at the same time the Wollunqua is undoubtedly the most important, and is regarded as the great father of all of the snakes.

Wollunqua originated at a certain spot in the Wingara time, and wandered about over the country. He started from the watering hole Kadjinara in the upper part of a rocky gorge in the Murchison Range, and travelled thence away out to the west. A different tradition says that he stood up and tried to go down into the earth so as to return to Thapauerlu, but could not do so until he reached a place called Ununtumurra, where at last he succeeded, and, diving down, travelled back underground to Thapauerlu, where he has lived ever since.

Setting out towards the east, he travelled at first underground, coming up at various spots where he performed ceremonies and left behind large numbers of spirit children, forming local totemic centres when he passed on. There are eleven spots which are especially associated with him in connection with his wanderings. The first is called Pitingari. Here, there is a water-hole where the old Wollunqua is reported to have come out of the earth and looked around. Still travelling on underground, the Wollunqua reached and halted at a place called Antipataringa. From Antipataringa the Wollunqua, still travelling underground, went on to Tjunguniari, and there he came out and walked about amongst the sand-hills, or rather, the head end of the body came out, for he was so long that although he had travelled very many miles away from his home at Kadjinara, his tail end still remained there. The last place on his wanderings, Ununtumurra, is especially important in the Wollonqua ceremonies.
