= Ulanji =

Mythological character

In Binbinga mythology, Ulanji is a snake-ancestor of the Binbinga.

== Myth ==
He bit the heads off of flying foxes and took out two of their ribs and their heart. Ulanji emerged from the ground at a place called Markumundana. He walked along to a large hill, Windilumba, where he made a spring, and a nearby mountain. He crossed what became known as the Limmen Creek, and made a range of hills and a valley, with many water-holes filled with lilies in them.

He left behind numbers of Ulanji spirits, which emanated from his body, wherever he performed ceremonies. After travelling widely, and making many mungai (totem animal) spots, he finally went into the ground at a water-hole called Uminiwura.

The Binbinga believe that both men and women can see the spirit children at the mungai spots.
