= Wuluwaid =

Australian Aboriginal rain god

In the Australian Aboriginal mythology of the Yolngu, Wuluwaid (or Wuluwait) is a rain god. He is a god from northern Arnhem Land and is known to work with Bunbulama as a rainmaker. He is also recorded by Charles Mountford and Ainslie Roberts as a boatman who ferries the souls of the dead to Purelko, the Aboriginal afterlife.

== Sources ==
The Dreamtime (1965) Ainslie Roberts and Charles P Mountford, Adelaide, Rigby Pty Ltd.
