= Loo-errn =

Australian Aboriginal spirit

In the Australian Aboriginal mythology of the Aboriginal people of south-eastern Australia, Loo-errn (Looern, Lohan, Lo-an) is the spirit ancestor and guardian of the Brataualung people, and is also described as an ancestor of the Bunurong people. Loo-errn had his home at Yiruk/Wamoon, and controlled the land between Hoddle's Creek and Yiruk/Wamoon, known as Marr-ne-beek.

The myth of Loo-errn holds that if any one not belonging to his country passed through it without his consent, he died an awful death as soon as he arrived at the end of his journey. Loo-errn was great and very powerful.

The Loo-errn myth stretches from Coorong, South Australia, to Wilsons Promontory, and is described thus: Loo-errn and his wife Lo-an-tuka were sitting and eating their usual meal of eel when a black swan feather fell from the sky and alerted Looern to the presence of the two Koonawara sisters (black swans) whom he decided to follow to try and kill to eat. When he followed them onto Wathaurong country, the Elders warned the sisters to stay away from him but he cursed them and turned the sisters into nasty beings. When the Elders then banished Looern, he chased the sisters across the sky and each time he landed he created granite formations such as the You Yangs (Wurdi Youang) and the formations north and west of Anakie, both south of the Parwan, as well as several other locations extending to Wilsons Promontory.
