= Penile subincision =

Body modification involving the slitting open of the underside of the penis

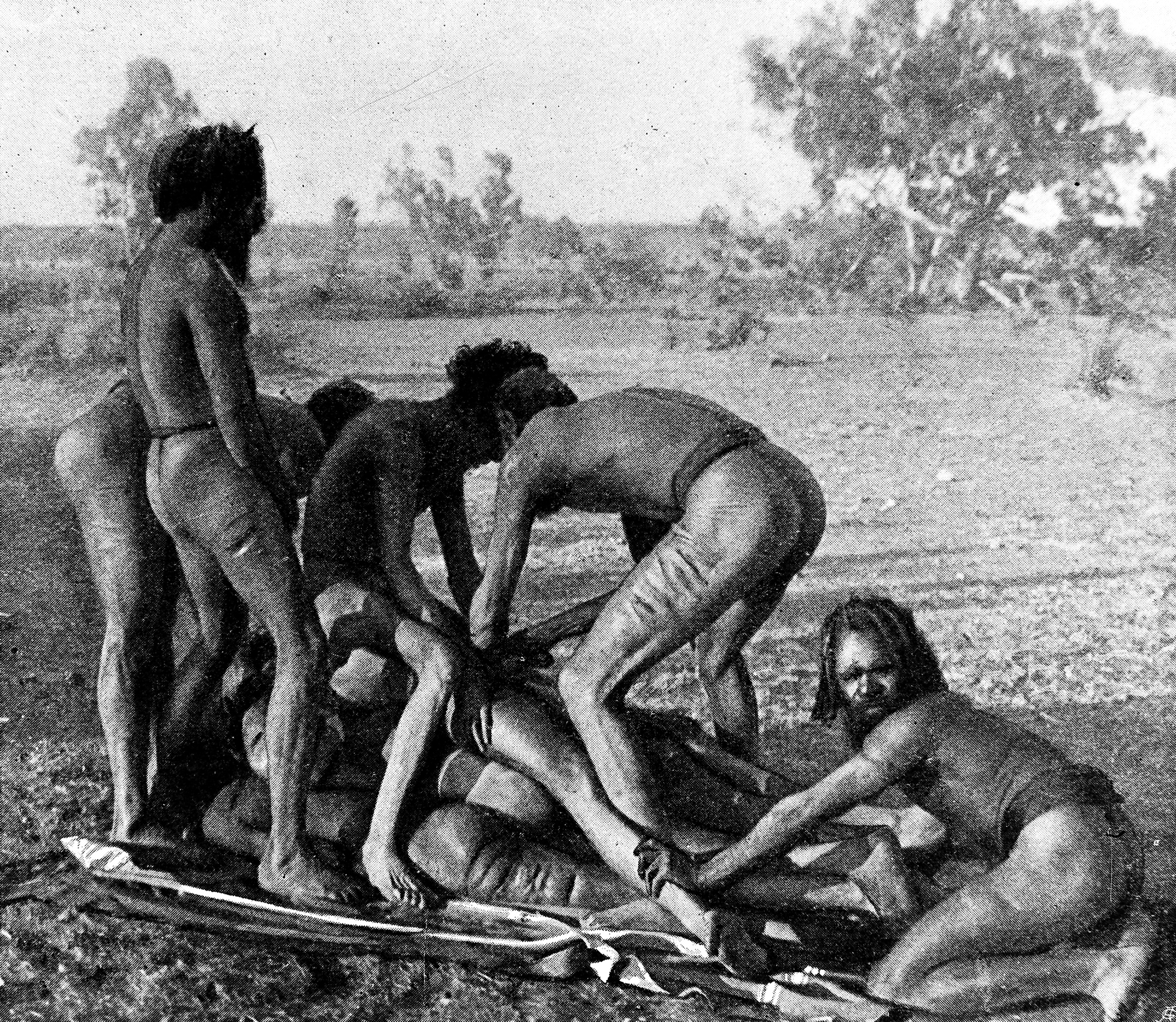
Operation of subincision, Warrumanga Tribe, Central Australia

Penile subincision is a form of genital modification or mutilation consisting of a urethrotomy, in which the underside of the penis is incised and the urethra slit open lengthwise, from the urethral opening (meatus) toward the base. The slit can be of varying lengths.

Subincision was traditionally performed around the world, notably in Australia, but also in Africa, South America, and the Polynesian and Melanesian cultures of the Pacific, often as a coming of age ritual.

Disadvantages include the risks inherent in the procedure itself, which is often self-performed, and increased susceptibility to sexually transmitted infections (STIs). The ability to impregnate (specifically, getting sperm into the vagina) may also be decreased.

Subincisions can greatly affect urination, often resulting in hypospadias requiring the subincized male to sit or squat while urinating. The scrotum can be pulled up against the open urethra to quasi-complete the tube and allow an approximation to normal urination, while a few subincized men carry a tube with which they can aim.

== Cultural traditions ==
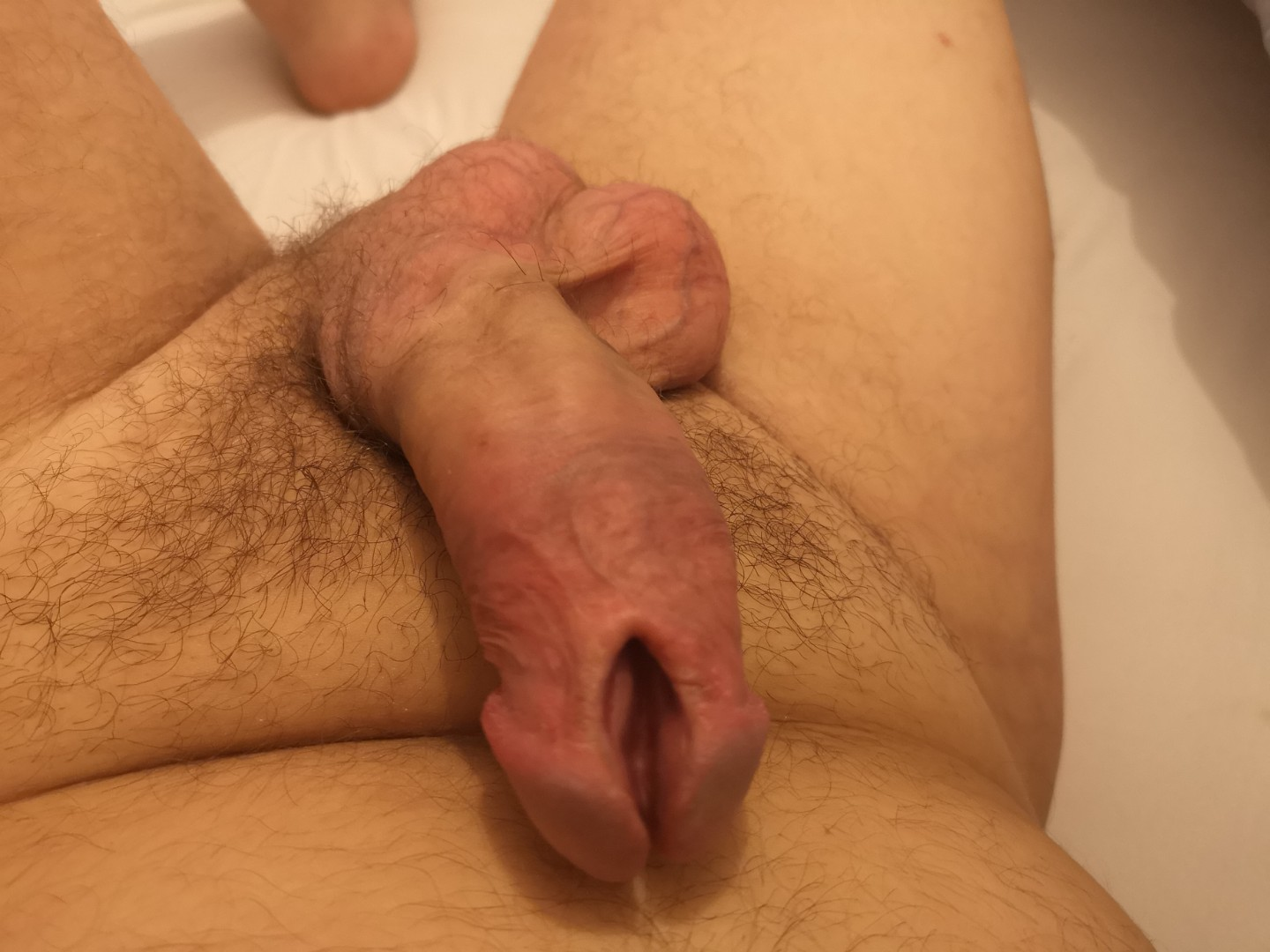
Start subincision

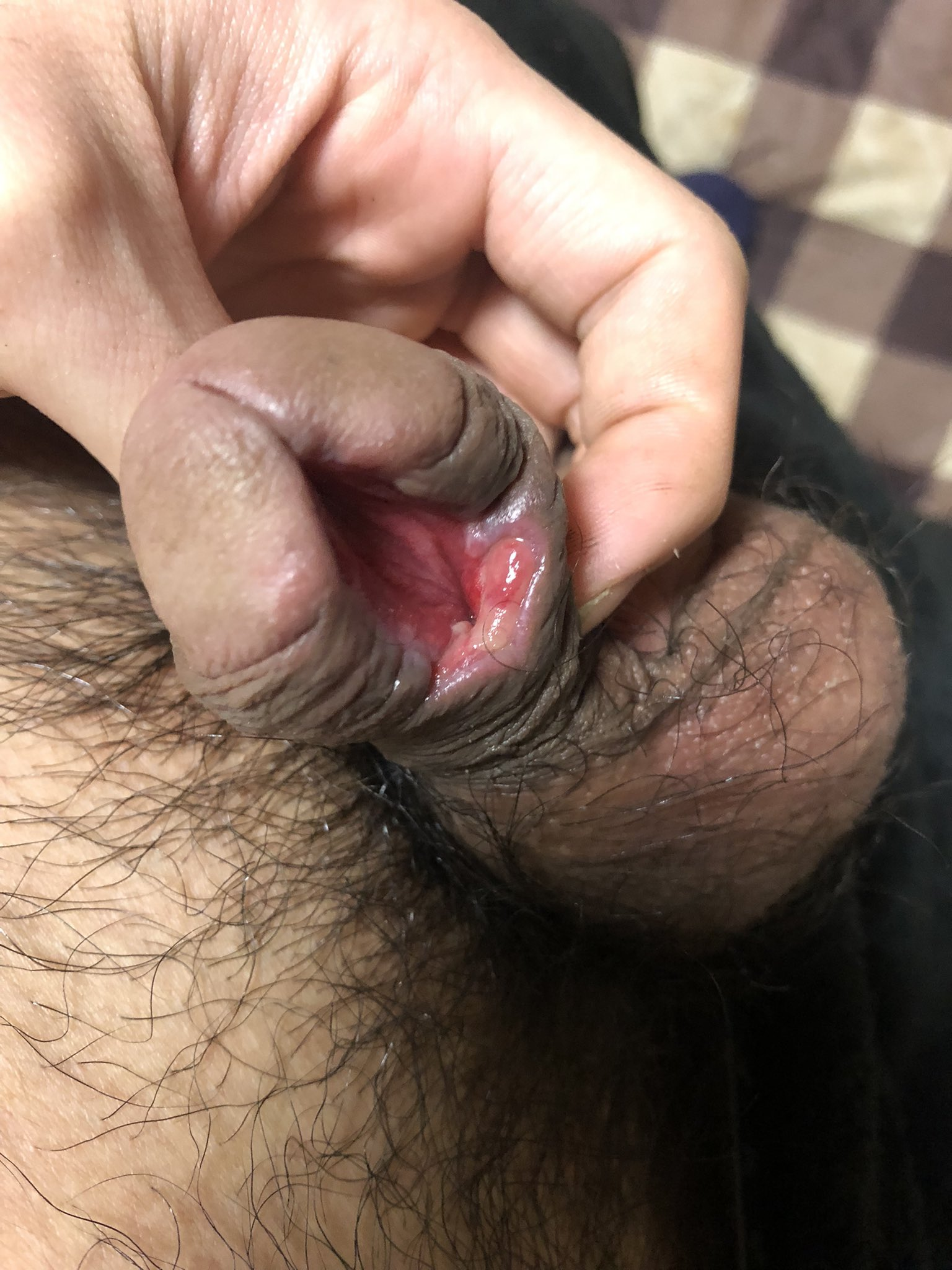
Subincision

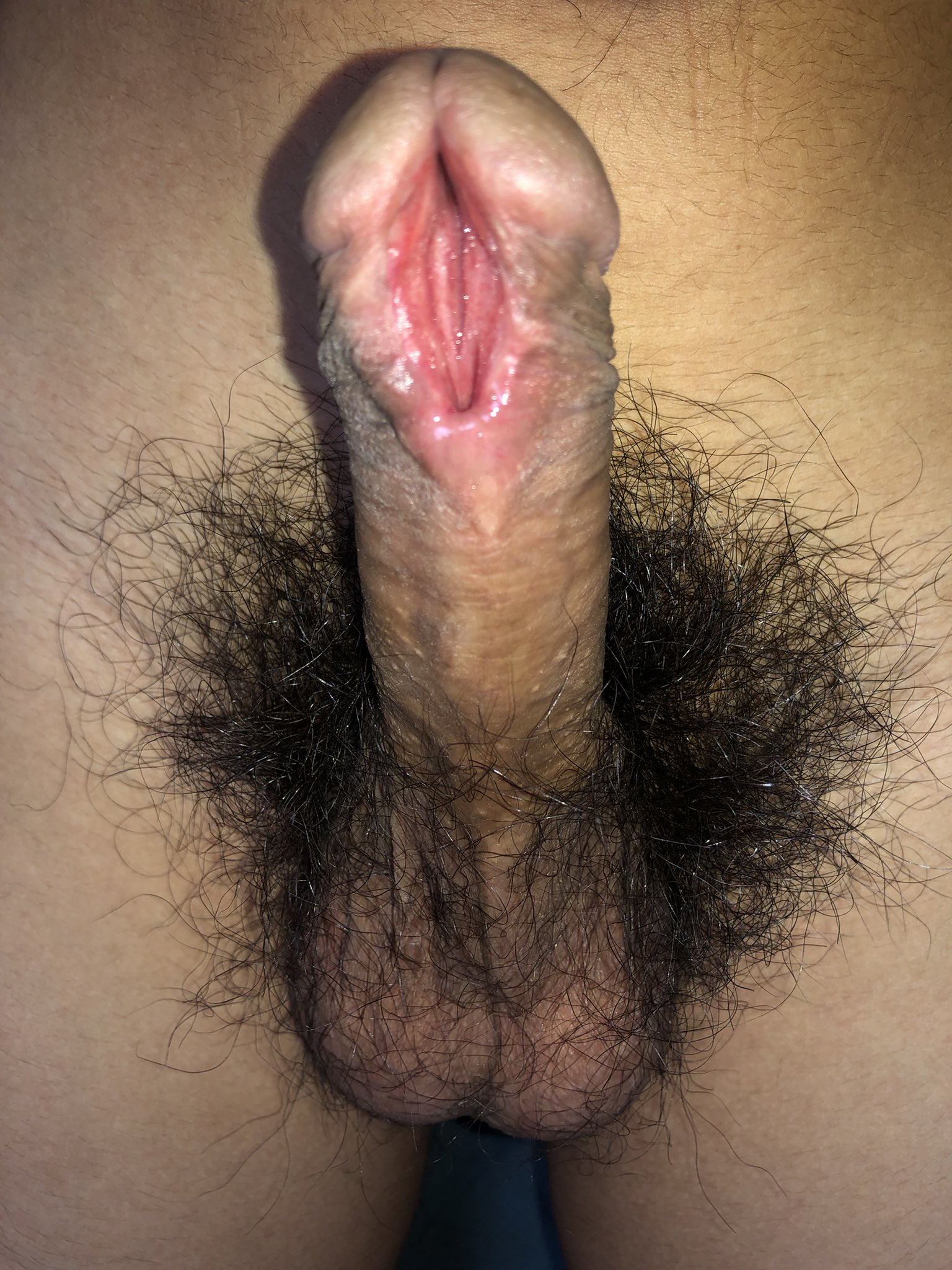
Subincision erection

Subincision (like circumcision) is well-documented among the peoples of the central desert of Australia such as the Arrernte and Luritja. The indigenous people of Australia who practice subincision also perform circumcision as a prerequisite. The Arrernte word for subincision is arilta, and occurs as a rite of passage ritual for adolescent boys. The Arrernte believe that the procedure was given to them by Mangar-kunjer-kunja, a lizard-man spirit being from the Dreamtime. Some academics theorize that a subincized penis is thought to resemble a vulva, and the bleeding is likened to menstruation. This type of modification of the penis was also traditionally performed by the Lardil people of Mornington Island, Queensland. The young men who underwent the procedure were the only ones to learn a simple ceremonial language, Damin. In later ceremonies, repeated throughout adult life, the subincized penis would be used as a site for ritual bloodletting. According to Ken Hale, who studied Damin, no ritual initiations have been carried out in the Gulf of Carpentaria for half a century, and hence the language has also died out.

Another indigenous Australian term for the custom is mika or the terrible rite.

Samburu herd-boys of Kenya are said to perform subincisions on themselves (or sometimes their peers) at age seven to ten. In Samoa, subincision of the foreskin, skin located along the tip of the penis, was ritually performed upon young men, as in Hawaii, where subincision of the foreskin is reported to have been performed at age six or seven.

== See also ==
- Body modification
- Meatotomy
- Modern primitive
