= Yee-Na-Pah =

Yee-Na-Pah is a figure in Arrernte mythology. She is a mountain devil spirit girl who marries an echidna spirit man called In-Nard-Dooah.
