= Akurra =

Deity for the Aboriginal people of South Australia

In the mythology of the Aboriginal people of South Australia (specifically, the Adnyamathanha people from the Flinders Ranges), Akurra is a great snake deity, sometimes associated with the Rainbow Serpent. Adnyamathanha elders describe it as a giant water snake with a beard mane, scales and sharp fangs, whose movements shaped the land. Akurra is associated with the power of the shaman, and nobody else may go near him with impunity.

Akurra is also connected with water and rain. According to one Adnyamathanha story, at times of severe drought the shamans would travel to the cave in which Akurra lived, draw the entire snake out and take his kidney fat, which they heated over a fire, allowing the melted fat to fall over the heated coals. A very strong wind would begin as the smell of burning fat rose into the sky, the clouds would open and the rain would come in a downpour, revitalising the whole land.
