= Pitapita =

Aboriginal Australian people

The Pitapita or Pitta Pitta are an Aboriginal Australian people of the state of Queensland.

== Language ==
They spoke Pitapita, one of the Karnic languages, which remains the best described dialect of an eastern group that comprised also Rangwa, Kunkalanya, Ngulupulu and Ringa-Ringa. It is otherwise closely related to the Western group consisting of Wangkajutjuru/Wangka-Yutjurru and Lhanima.

== Country ==
The Pitapita's precise geographical borders are not known, since the earliest detailed account of them, by Walter Roth, included numerous subtribes and hordes in a somewhat confusing presentation. (Note: "The tribes indigenous to the Boulia district can therefore only be located within certain limits, as follows:—The Boinji, Dungadungara, Tunnateunnea, Bingo-Hingo, &c., in the neighbourhood of Marion Downs, the Pitta-Pitta at Boulia, the Ooloopooloo at Bedouri, the Eukkia and Tinka-Tinki at Cooraboolka, the B, ungo-Eungo in the country between Herbert and Roxburgh Downs, the Koonkoolenya at Mooraboola, the Kwokwa and Weelko at PilJiou Creei, the Tellunga along Noranside and the Burke River, the Tunda at Booloo-Booloo, Warenda, Muckunda Creek, and Tooleybuck, the Karanya at Cluny, the Tuntauntaya at Breadalbane, the Ulaolinya at Carlo (vel Mungerebar) and Upper Mulligan River, the Miorli at Springvale, the Lakes, Cork, and Middle Diamantina River, the Wonkajera in the neighbourhood of Glenormiston (vel Idamea) and Herbert Downs, &c.." (Roth 1897, p. 41)) Norman Tindale remarked that the precise tribal distribution was impossible to determine on the basis of Roth's data but that their area was in the present day Shire of Boulia, extending from Fort William in the north, through Boulia and some 50 miles south of the district, suggesting a territorial range of roughly 2,700 square miles (7,000 km^{2}).

Their land was adjacent to the Wanggamala people.

== History of contact ==
Opening up the country to white settlement led to the displacement of numerous tribes in the area from their traditional grounds, and "with privation, disease, alcohol and lead", whole communities were annihilated. By the time of his sojourn at Boulia, Roth goes on to estimate that, as with most tribes in the area, the Pitapita were suffering from a rapid demographic collapse, and he stated that no more than 200 probably remained in the whole of the district.

== Native title ==
In 2012 a Federal Court awarded the Pitapita native title rights to 30,000 square kilometres (12,000 sq mi) of land in the Boulia region.

== Social organisation and rites ==
The Pitapita practised both circumcision and subincision as part of their initiatory rites.

== Alternative names ==
- Bitta Bitta
- Pittapitta
- Wangkahicho
- Wangkahichs (typo)
- Wangkapit:a

Source: Tindale 1974, p. 184

== Some words ==
- amma (mother)
- apari (father)
- munga (tame dog)
- punamya (wild dog) (Note: Editor's note. Throughout Roth's grammar of Pitapita, he only cites the word 'piouli' for the Pitapita term for dog. (Roth 1897, pp. 7, 9, 11, 14–16, 19, 25, 29))
- tita (white man)

Source: Eglinton 1886, p. 364

== Sources ==
- "AIATSIS map of Indigenous Australia". AIATSIS. 14 May 2024.
- Bowern, Claire (2004). "The origins of tense-based case marking in Pitta-Pitta and Wangkajutjuru". Australian Journal of Linguistics. 24 (2): 163–183. doi:10.1080/0726860042000271816. S2CID 62763157.
- Eglinton, Ernest (1886). "On the Hamilton River, and near Boulia. The Bitta Bitta tribe" (PDF). In Curr, Edward Micklethwaite (ed.). The Australian race: its origin, languages, customs, place of landing in Australia and the routes by which it spread itself over the continent. Vol. 2. Melbourne: J. Ferres. pp. 364–365.
- Roth, W. E. (1897). Ethnological Studies among the North-West-Central Queensland Aborigines (PDF). Brisbane: Edmund Gregory, Government Printer.
- Tapp, Virginia (29 August 2012). Pitta Pitta people awarded native title for Boulia land. ABC rural.
- Tindale, Norman Barnett (1974). "Pitapita (QLD)". Aboriginal Tribes of Australia: Their Terrain, Environmental Controls, Distribution, Limits, and Proper Names. Australian National University Press. ISBN 978-0-708-10741-6.
