= Yalungur =

Bird in Australian Aboriginal mythology

In the Australian Aboriginal mythology of the Bullanji people, Yalungur is a great bird, an eagle or hawk. He was castrated either by Gidja or by Gidja's brother Mali so that Gidja could create the first woman.
