= Mar'rallang =

Name shared by twin sisters in Australian Aboriginal mythology

In the Australian Aboriginal religion and mythology of the Ngarrindjeri people, Mar'rallang was the name shared by twin sisters who lived together. They both married the same man.

Having heard of a young hunter by the name of Waiyungari, both Mar'rallang and her twin (also Mar'rallang) set out to meet him. While he is hunting game, the eldest of the sisters is hides in a bush and imitates the cry of a female emu. Attracted by the noise, the hunter discovers her laughing at him. A few days later, the younger sister plays the same trick. Falling under the charm of the two sisters, the hunter marries them against his uncle's advice. The uncle, upset, seeks advice from Nebalee, a wise man of heaven and brother of the Great Spirit. He is given the advice to separate his nephew from the two women.

To separate them, the man chooses to use the fire. One night, taking advantage of their sleep, he sets fire to their encampment. Awakened by noise and smoke, the young hunter and his wives quickly find themselves encircled and trapped by the flames. Seeing no escape, the hunter confides his spear to his wives and asks Nebalee to save the two Mar'rallang, making fun of his own fate. Nebalee replies by raising his spear (on which Mar'rallang and Mar'rallang were standing) towards the sky. The husband sees his wives disappear, but before he sinks into unconsciousness because of the smoke, he hears a voice say to him "take your place among the stars to remind people to think of others before thinking about oneself".

It is not known which stars the narrative is attached to, but the hunter hero is associated with Mars.

== Sources ==
- Hamacher, Duane (8 November 2017). "Stars that vary in brightness shine in the oral traditions of Aboriginal Australians". The Conversation.
- Stephen Robert Chadwick; Martin Paviour-Smith, The Great Canoes in the Sky: Starlore and Astronomy of the South Pacific, Springer, Nov 2016, p.233 (ISBN 978-3-3192-2623-1), « The Love Story of Wy-Young-Gurrie », p. 20–22

== Bibliography ==
Alexander Wyclif Reed, Aboriginal Stories, Reed, 1994, 230 p. (ISBN 978-0-7301-0481-0), « The Husband and wives who became stars », p. 60 (en) David Unaipon, Legendary Tales of the Australian Aborigines, Melbourne University Press, 2001, 232 p. (ISBN 978-0-5228-4905-9), « Love Story of the Mar'Rallang », p. 74
