= Ngiṉṯaka =

Lizard in Australian Aboriginal mythology

Ngiṉṯaka (Aboriginal pronunciation: [ŋiɳʈaka]), also spelled Ngintaku, is a mythological giant perentie lizard from Aṉangu and Pitjantjatjara Aboriginal religion. It is associated with Angatja, an area along an important songline.

Ngiṉṯaka is one of the two major reptile Ancestral Beings associated with Uluru, the other being Milpali.

== Myth ==
Ngiṉṯaka's songline, known as Inma Ngiṉṯaka, tells of his journey of creation over 500 km. The song’s stanzas follow his travels through the land, where he is portrayed with human characteristics.

In the myth, Ngiṉṯaka travels from his home near the Western Australia border to the camp of another lizard tribe, near Oodnadatta, in search of a better grindstone. He steals the Anangu grindstone and carries it home while being chased by the Anangu people. Along his journey, he digs up tjanmatjas (bush onions), creating large boulders. As he travels, he creates many landforms in the Musgrave and Mann Ranges and vomits up various grass seeds and vegetable foods. It is colored black and white as a form of camouflage to hide from predators.

== Geography ==
According to mythology, Ngarutjaranya, the highest mountain in South Australia, is also Ngiṉṯaka as he rears up to look over the country. He is returning to his home in the west.
