= Chinny-kinik =

Cannibal giant in Australian Aboriginal mythology

Chinny-kinik was a dreaded cannibal giant from Australian Aboriginal mythology said to have terrorised the Yenpulla plain east of the Murray River in South Australia. Two of his uncles, members of the local clan whose numbers had been decimated, tracked him to a sinkhole in an area called Pekarra and discovered the entrance to a vast cave.

With Chinny-kinik sheltering inside from a cold wind, they stacked the entrance with bundles of firewood and set them alight. The uncles added logs to the blaze to block the entrance and seal the cannibal giant’s doom.

== Localisation ==
Renowned naturalist and conservationist, Tom Bellchambers, who recorded the story in 1921, narrowed the cave’s possible location to an area between the river towns of Swan Reach and Morgan and some distance back from the river.

In a 2024 article for Caves Australia, Karl Brandt proposed the Bakara Well Cave, discovered in the early 1970s and lying around twenty-five kilometres directly east of Swan Reach, as the cannibal giant’s lair. The location may have been originally recorded as ‘Pekarra’ instead of ‘Bakara’ as according to Early Forms of Aboriginal English in South Australia, 1840s-1920s, some Aboriginal speakers did not distinguish between the sounds ‘p’ and ‘b’.

== See also ==
- Thardid Jimbo, a cannibal giant from Australian Aboriginal mythology
