= Erathipa =

Boulder in Australian Aboriginal mythology

In Australian Aboriginal mythology, Erathipa is a boulder with an opening on one side, believed to contain the souls of dead children, watching for young women to rebirth the children in their wombs. This myth has been kept by the Arrernte people.

When women who do not want children go near the rock, they pretend to be old, and walk as if leaning on a stick, crying; "Don't come to me, I am an old woman!"

The idea implicit in all these rites, is that certain stones have the power to make sterile women fruitful, either because of the spirits of the ancestors that dwell in them, or because of their shape [like a pregnant woman], or because of their [autogenic] origin.

— David Adams Leeming, World of Myth: An Anthology
