= Marabbecca =

Legendary creature

The marabbecca is a legendary creature that originates from Sicily. The creature, whose name is likely of Arab origin, lives in wells and reservoirs, takes the appearance of a woman or amphibian and only moves at night. It is believed to have been invented by Sicilian parents to prevent their children from playing near wells.

== See also ==
- Borda
