= Maithakari =

Aboriginal Australian people of Queensland

The Maikathari (Mayi-Thakurti) were an Aboriginal Australian people of the state of Queensland.

== Country ==
The Maithakari had, according to ethnologist Norman Tindale, approximately 3,400 square miles (8,800 km^{2}) of tribal territory extending from the Williams River and Cloncurry. Running north, its boundaries touched Canobie on the Cloncurry River, and extended east to where Julia Creek joins the Cloncurry, and also to Mount Fort Bowen. They were also present at Dalgonally.

== Social organisation and rites ==
They did not practise either circumcision or subincision.

== Alternative names ==
- Maiðakuri
- Maiðakui
- Maidhagudi, Maitakudi
- Mayatagoorri
- Mythugadi
- Majadhagudi
- Mythuggadi
- Mythaguddi, Mitagurdi, Mittagurdi, Mitagurdi, Mitakoodi, Mittakoodi
- Mitrogoordi, Mitroogoordi

== Sources ==
- Armit, W. E. (1886). "The Mouth of the Leichardt River" (PDF). In Curr, Edward Micklethwaite (ed.). The Australian race: its origin, languages, customs, place of landing in Australia and the routes by which it spread itself over the continent. Vol. 2. Melbourne: J. Ferres. pp. 300–305.
- Howitt, Alfred William (1904). The native tribes of south-east Australia (PDF). Macmillan.
- Palmer, Edward (1884). "Notes on some Australian tribes". Journal of the Anthropological Institute of Great Britain and Ireland. 13: 276–347. doi:10.2307/2841896. JSTOR 2841896.
- Palmer, Edward (1886). "The Cloncurry River" (PDF). In Curr, Edward Micklethwaite (ed.). The Australian race: its origin, languages, customs, place of landing in Australia and the routes by which it spread itself over the continent. Vol. 2. Melbourne: J. Ferres. pp. 330–339.
- Roth, W. E. (1897). Ethnological Studies among the North-West-Central Queensland Aborigines. Brisbane: Edmund Gregory, Government Printer.
- Sharp, Lauriston R. (March 1939). "Tribes and Totemism in North-East Australia". Oceania. 9 (3): 254–275. doi:10.1002/j.1834-4461.1939.tb00232.x. JSTOR 40327744.
- Tindale, Norman Barnett (1974). "Maithakari (QLD)". Aboriginal Tribes of Australia: Their Terrain, Environmental Controls, Distribution, Limits, and Proper Names. Australian National University Press.
