= Barraiya =

God in Australian Aboriginal mythology

Barraiya is a god in Australian Aboriginal mythology who created the first vagina with a spear so that Eingana could give birth.
