= Dilga =

Goddess of fertility and growth in Australian Aboriginal mythology

In Australian aboriginal mythology (specifically: Karadjeri), Dilga is a goddess of fertility and growth, and the mother of the Bagadjimbiri. She avenged their deaths at the hands of Ngariman by drowning him in her milk, which resurrected her children.
