= Nogamain =

- God of creation
- Abode: Sky
- Ethnic group: Murrinh-Patha

In Murrinh-Patha mythology, Nogamain is a sky-dwelling god who gives spirit children to mortal parents. He is a "pure spirit" who exists independently from the "dreamtime and created himself from nothingness. Nogomain is a Creator god who is often described in a similar way to Djamar. In some myths he has no family, in others he has a wife and a son who is symbolized by a hunting spear. He is sometimes referred to as the man in the moon.
