= Papinijuwari =

In Tiwi mythology, Papinijuwaris are one-eyed giants who live in a large hut where the sky ends. Shooting stars are said to be Papinijuwaris stalking across the heavens with a burning firestick in one hand and a fighting club in the other. Papinijuwaris feed on the bodies of the dead and the blood of the sick. They are able to locate sick people by smell, and upon finding a victim will make themselves invisible and suck the person's blood without leaving a wound. As the sick person weakens, the Papinijuwari makes itself small enough to enter the body through the mouth and drinks up the rest of the blood from the inside.
