= Bamapana =

Australian Aboriginal trickster god

In Yolngu mythology, Bamapana is a trickster god who causes discord. He is obscene and profane and once committed incest, thus breaking a strict taboo.
