= Thinan-malkia =

Evil spirit in Australian Aboriginal mythology

Thinan-malkia is an evil spirit in Australian Aboriginal mythology that captures victims with nets that entangle their feet.
