= Musimon =

Charge in European heraldry

A heraldic depiction of a Musimon

The musimon (also known as the tityrus or tytron) is a charge in European heraldry. It is a cross between a goat and a sheep; it has the feet and body of a goat, the head and beard of a ram, and two horns from each for a total of four—two curved and two straight.

Musimon can also refer to the real animal known as the European mouflon (Ovis aries musimon), a wild short-fleeced mountain sheep found on the islands of Corsica and Sardinia and parts of mainland Europe.

== See also ==
- Polycerate
