= Mungoon-Gali =

Folk tale villain

Creature information
- Grouping: Legendary creature
- Sub grouping: Reptile
- Folklore: Australian Aboriginal mythology

Origin
- Country: Australia
- Habitat: Bush

Mungoon-Gali, also transcribed as Mungoongarlee, is a giant goanna from Yuwaalaraay Folklore who terrorised the local people with his venomous bite and voracious appetite. Afraid the tribes would soon be wiped out by the constant attacks, Ouyouboolooey the black snake offered to steal the hidden poison bag from Mungoon-Gali for in those days, it was lizards instead of snakes that were venomous. He waited until the goanna was resting after a large meal before offering to reveal the tribes’ secret plot in exchange for being allowed to hold the poison bag for his own safety. Mungoon-Gali, reluctant but determined to learn of the plot against him, took the poison bag from his mouth and handed it Ouyouboolooey who placed it in his own and fled, easily outpacing the still sluggish reptile. On returning to the tribes, Ouyouboolooey refused to destroy the bag and instead retreated into the bush which explains how snakes become venomous and lizards, like the ferocious Mungoon-Gali, lost their bite.

In another story, Mungoon-Gali and his tribe of giant goannas lived in the Riverina during a time of great drought. While the other animals in the region died of thirst, the goannas drunk from a secret water supply hidden among the mountain rocks. Kubbitha, a black duck and the youngest wife of Mungoon-Gali, was determined to find the water so one day, instead of digging for roots, she followed the tracks of the goannas into the mountains. She reached a high plateau but was forced to rest in a cave due to the heat and exhaustion. After being awakened by a friendly mountain spirit, Kubbitha followed his advice and plunged her yam stick into the very heart of the mountain. A great stream poured forth, ending the drought and forming the Murrumbidgee River.

In Yuwaalaraay, mangun.gaali refers to the lace monitor.

== See also ==
- Whowie, a fearsome creature from Australian Aboriginal mythology resembling a giant six-legged goanna
