= Muldjewangk =

Creature in Australian Aboriginal mythology

The Muldjewangk or Mulyawonk is a water-creature in Ngarrindjeri mythology that inhabited the Murray River, particularly Lake Alexandrina. It was used as a deterrent for Aboriginal children who wished to play near the riverside after dark. Sometimes they are portrayed as evil merfolk, and other times as a gargantuan monster. Accounts are inconsistent as to whether there are many of the creatures, or a single "The Muldjewangk".

One legend tells of a Muldjewangk who attacked a steamboat owned by European settlers. The captain saw two great hands grasping the hull of the boat so he grabbed his gun. Aboriginal elders on board warned the captain not to shoot, but their pleas fell on deaf ears. The elders warned the captain that he would suffer as a result of his actions. Soon after, the captain broke out in weeping red blisters over his body, and took six months to die.

The Muldjewangk pesters Ngurunderi (see Murray River) and his wives when they settle on the banks of Lake Alexandrina by wrecking their fishing nets.

Large clumps of floating seaweed are said to hide Muldjewangks and are to be avoided. Large footprints have also been seen. Some elders now say the Muldjewangks no longer inhabit the river system.

== See also ==
- Bunyip - another aquatic monster from Indigenous Australian mythology
