= Eingana =

Aboriginal creator snake goddess

Eingana is a creator goddess in Australian Aboriginal mythology (specifically: Jawoyn). Otherwise known as the "Dreamtime Snake", she is the mother of all water animals and humans. She is a snake goddess of death who lives in the Dreaming. She has no vagina; she simply grew in size and, unable to give birth to the life inside her, had the god Barraiya open a hole with a spear near her anus so that labour could commence. Eingana holds a sinew that is attached to every living thing; if she lets go of one, the attached creature dies.

== Extract ==
Eingana made everything, Eingana had everything inside herself that first time, Eingana is a snake. She swallowed all the blackfellows. She took them inside herself, down under the water. Eingana came out. She was big with everything inside her. She came out of a big waterhole near Bamboo Creek. Eingana was rolling about, every way on the ground. She was groaning and calling out. She was making a big noise with all the blackfellows, everything inside her belly. No one can see Eingana. In the rain time, when the flood water comes, Eingana stands up out of the middle of the flood water. She looks out at the country, she lets go all the birds, snakes, animals, children belonging to us.
