= Minka Bird =

The Minka or Minka Bird is a bird, sometimes described as an owl, that featured in the stories of the Ngarrindjeri people of the Murray River in South Australia. The mulduwanke is a similar owl or bird of the Ngarrindjeri, but instead of foretelling death it stole children. Both were believed to live in dark recesses.
