= Kinie Ger =

Australian Aboriginal mythological monster

In the traditional stories of Southeastern Australia, Kinie Ger is an evil half-man, half-quoll beast that hunts and kills the innocent with his spear, until he is himself killed in an ambush.

== The myth ==
The Kinie Ger was a monster from Australian Aboriginal mythology. It was described as half human and half quoll (a marsupial predator related to the Tasmanian devil). It was a ruthless killer with the head and body of a quoll but the limbs of a man. It wandered around killing innocent people, birds and animals and was the terror of the bush. In the myth, the creature was stated to have been killed by the owl and the crow who ambushed him when he came to drink at a water hole. Supposedly when the creature was finally defeated, it shrank down and became the first quoll, the founding father of the quoll race.

== Bibliography ==
Unaipon, David (1929). Aboriginal Legends No. 1, Kinie Ger, the native cat
