= Kunapipi =

Goddess in Australian Aboriginal mythology

Kunapipi, also spelt Gunabibi, ('womb') is a mother goddess and the patron deity of many heroes in Australian Aboriginal mythology.

== Story ==
Kunapipi gave birth to human beings as well as to most animals and plants. Now a vague, otiose, spiritual being, "the old woman" (Kadjeri) once emerged from the waters and travelled across the land with a band of heroes and heroines, and during the Dreaming she gave birth to men and women as well as creating the natural species. She could transform herself either into a male or female version of the Rainbow Serpent.

== Origins and diffusion ==
The Kunapipi cult seems to have arisen among tribes in the Roper and Rose River areas. In the Alawa version, she is said to have emerged from the waters. From there, it is thought to have gradually spread north-east into Arnhem Land, where it existed as a complementary masculine form with Djanggawul, a female figure. According to Tony Swain, Kunapipi traditions, especially regarding her northern origins, reflect the impact of Sulawesi/Macassar influences, via contacts with trepang traders, and possibly the pre-Islamic rice mother cult, which survived down to modern times among the Toraja and Bugis.

== Sources ==
- Berndt, R. M. (1974). Australian Aboriginal Religion. Vol. 3. Brill. ISBN 9004037276.
- Swain, Tony (February 1991). The Earth Mother from Northern Waters. Vol. 30. History of Religions. pp. 223–260. JSTOR 106295.
