= Mokoi =

Evil spirit in Yolngu Australian Aboriginal mythology

In Australian Aboriginal mythology (specifically: Yolngu), Mokoi (lit. "evil spirit") is an evil spirit who killed sorcerers who used black magic. Also known to kidnap children at night to eat them. The Murngin believed that death was rarely caused by old age and instead it was the work of a mokoi, who would bring about some sort of disease or fatal accident. The legend say he gave his life for the devil. He's in his debt and he's helping him. His main task is to kill magicians who take pleasure in black magic. He does this because the magicians take a pact and it leads to death. He eats the children to extract their elixir of life. He needs the elixir to strengthen himself, which is paradoxical because he's dead. Another thesis is, that he kills the children to lure the parents into the woods to inflict them harm.

== Sources ==
https://www.godchecker.com/australian-aboriginal-mythology/MOKOI/
