= Wirnpa =

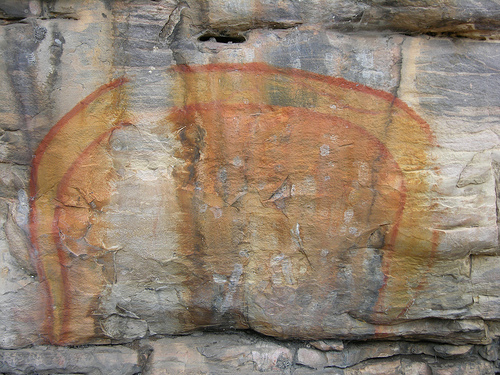
Australian Aboriginal rock painting of "The Rainbow Serpent".

Wirnpa is a rainmaking snake who according to Western Desert Australian Aboriginal legend created the land around the Percival Lakes in Wirnpa country, Australia in the Dreaming and whose image was used to repel outsiders.
