= Mangar-kunjer-kunja =

Creator deity in Arrente religion

In Arrernte religion and mythology, Mangar-kunjer-kunja is a lizard Ancestral Being who created humans. He found the first aboriginal beings, Rella manerinja, on one side of a hill; they were fused together and he separated them with a knife and cut holes for their mouths, ears and noses, then gave them the knife, spear, shield, fire, boomerang and the tjurunga, and lastly gave them a system of marriage.
