= Rainbow Serpent =

Creator god and common motif of Aboriginal Australia

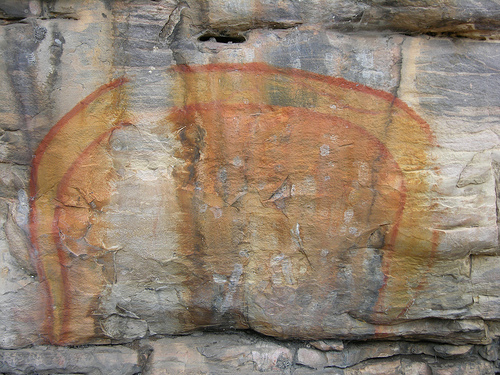
Australian Aboriginal rock painting of the "Rainbow Serpent"

The Rainbow Serpent or Rainbow Snake is a common deity, often seen as the creator god, known by numerous names in different Australian Aboriginal languages by the many different Aboriginal peoples. It is a common motif in the art and religion of many Aboriginal Australian peoples. Much like the archetypal mother goddess, the Rainbow Serpent creates land and diversity for the Aboriginal people, but when disturbed can bring great chaos.

There are many names and stories associated with the serpent, all of which communicate the significance and power of this being within Aboriginal mythology, which includes the worldview commonly referred to as The Dreaming. The serpent is viewed as a giver of life through its association with water, but can be a destructive force if angry. The Rainbow Serpent is one of the most common and well-known Aboriginal stories and is of great importance to Aboriginal society.

Not all of the myths in this family describe the ancestral being as a snake. Of those that do, not all of them draw a connection with a rainbow. However, a link with water or rain is typical. The rainbow is associated with a waterhole in a wide range of regions across Australia, in various states and in much of the state of Western Australia. When the rainbow is seen in the sky, it is said to be the Rainbow Serpent (Dhakkan) moving from one water-hole (or panhole) to another (as in Kabi Kabi lore). Thus a reliable watering hole (or rather, "rock hole") is regarded as being the permanent dwelling of a rainbow serpent, an understandable piece of folklore where so many water-holes dry up in the drought.

The Rainbow Serpent Festival is an annual festival of music, arts and culture in Victoria.

== Names ==
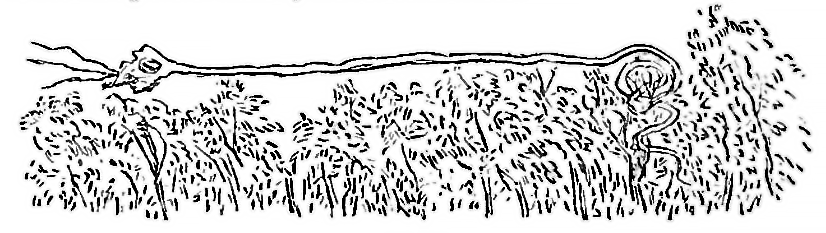
Myndie drawn by an aboriginal. —Smyth (1878) The Aborigines of Victoria

The Rainbow Serpent is known by different names by the many different Aboriginal cultures.

Yurlunggur is the name of the "rainbow serpent" according to the Murngin (a Yolngu group) in north-eastern Arnhem Land, also styled Yurlungur, Yulunggur, Jurlungur, Julunggur or Julunggul. The Yurlunggur was considered "the great father".

The serpent is called Wititj (var. Witij) and depicted in bark paintings or print by artists of the Galpu clan (Note: Artist: Djalu Gurruwiwi) in the Dhuwa Moiety of the Dhangu people (or other clans of the in the Dhuwa moiety of the Yolngu peoples). (Note: Galwanuk Liyagalawumirr clan of the Dhuwa moiety.)

Kanmare is the name of the great water serpent (with a mane-like head of hair) in Queensland (Note: The first example in the 1926 rainbow serpent paper by Radcliffe-Brown.) among the Pitapita people of the Boulia District; it is apparently a giant carpet snake, and recorded under the name Cunmurra further south. (Note: Given as Cunmurra in Duncan-Kemp (1933), in here reminiscences at "Mooraberrie homestead, 138 miles (222 km) west of Windorah"; Mooraberrie Station being approximately 180 miles (290 km) south of Boulia.) (Note: Roth (1897) cited in Radcliffe-Brown (1926), p. 19) (Note: Johnston (1943), p. 289 citing Roth (1897) and Duncan-Kemp (1933).) The same snake is called Tulloun among the Mitakoodi (Maithakari). Two mythical Kooremah (or Kuremah) of the Mycoolon (Maikulan) tribe of Queensland, are cosmic carpet snakes 40 miles long, residing in watery realm of the dead, or on the pathway leading to it; this is probably equivalent to the rainbow snake also. (Note: Radcliffe-Brown (1926), p. 20, citing Palmer.)

Approximate loci of Rainbow Serpent nomenclature (tribe) in Australia

Other names include:

- Numereji by the Kakadu (Gaagudju)
- Ngalyod (Note: Or Ngalmudj.) by the Kunwinjku
  - Yingarna, the original (female) Rainbow Serpent, whose son is Ngalyod, though these names may be used interchangeably
- Bolung (Note: Styled "Boluŋ" in Elkin (1952), p. 246.) in the Northern Territory, by the Dangbon/Dalabon/Buan and Rembarrnga
  - Langal (secret name of Bolung)
- muitj (var. Moitt, Muit) in Central Arnhemland by the Rembarrnga, etc.
- Kulunada, by Anmatyerr people of the Central Desert region of the Northern Territory
- Kunmanggur by the Murinbata
- Wollunqua by the Warumungu
  - Wonungur (N and NW Territories)/ Wonungar
  - Worombi
- Wanampi by the Aṉangu
- Andrénjinyi by the natives of Pennefather River, North Queensland
- Taipan by the Wikmunkan
- Yero (Daintree and Bloomfield Rivers, Northern Queensland)
- Goorialla by the Lardil people
- Dhakkan (or Takkan) by the Kabi Kabi (Gubbi Gubbi)
- Galeru (or Galoru, Kaleru) by the Wandjina (Kimberley Region)
- Ungud (or Ungur) by the Wandjina (Kimberley Region)
- Wanamangura by the Thalanyji (Talainji)
- Wagyl by the Noongar
- Kajura by the Ingarda
- Wonambi (Ooldea Region, SA; also Lake Darlot, WA)
- Kurrea said to inhabit Boobera Lagoon, NSW
- Myndie (Note: Under the dominion of creator-being Pund-jel (Bunjil).) by the Aboriginal peoples of Victoria near Melbourne

== Development of concept ==
Although the concept of the Rainbow Serpent has existed for a very long time in Aboriginal Australian cultures, it was introduced to the wider world through the work of anthropologists. Kenneth Maddock suggests that the name Rainbow Serpent or Rainbow Snake appears to have been coined in English by Alfred Radcliffe-Brown, an anthropologist who noticed the same concept going under different names among various Aboriginal Australian cultures, and called it "the rainbow-serpent myth of Australia". Radcliffe-Brown's position was that the "rainbow-serpent is not confined in Australia to any particular ethnological province, but is very widespread and may very possibly be practically universal". Charles P. Mountford, rather than the one myth, preferred to speak of "rainbow serpent myths" of Australia, though it is recognized they are not all independent, but share common motifs.

It has been suggested that the Serpent's position as the most prominent creator God in the Australian tradition has largely been the creation of non-Aboriginal anthropologists.

== Characteristics ==
The rainbow serpent is in the first instance, the rainbow itself. (Note: Or at least in some instances, identified with the rainbow (or otherwise associated with the rainbow).) It is said to inhabit particular waterholes, springs etc., because such bodies of water can exhibit spectral colors by diffracting light, according to one explanation. Likewise, the rainbow quartz crystal and certain seashells are also associated with the Rainbow Serpent, and are used in rituals involving the rainbow serpent. (Note: Quartz crystal and "elongated pieces of pearl-shell, pindjauandja" used by medicine men of Forrest River District, in rites involving the rainbow serpent.) The underlying reasons are likewise explainable, since quartz acts as a prism to diffract light into different colours, while the mother of pearl exhibits an iridescence of colours. (Note: The Serpent is also identified with a prismatic halo around the moon that can be regarded as a sign of rain.)

The Dreaming (or Dreamtime or Tjukurrpa or Jukurrpa) stories tell of the great spirits and totems during creation, in animal and human form that moulded the barren and featureless earth. The Rainbow Serpent came from beneath the ground and created huge ridges, mountains, and gorges as it pushed upward. The Rainbow Serpent is understood to be of immense proportions and inhabits deep permanent waterholes and is in control of life's most precious resource, water. In some cultures, the Rainbow Serpent is considered to be the ultimate creator of everything in the universe.

In some cultures, the Rainbow Serpent is male; in others, female; in yet others, the gender is ambiguous or the Rainbow Serpent is hermaphroditic or bigender, thus an androgynous entity. Some commentators have suggested that the Rainbow Serpent is a phallic symbol, which fits its connection with fertility myths and rituals. When the Serpent is characterized as female or bigender, it is sometimes depicted with breasts, as in the case of the Kunmanggur serpent. Other times, the Serpent has no particular gender.

The serpent is sometimes ascribed with a having crest or a mane or on its head, or being bearded as well.

While it is single-headed, the Yurlunggur of Arnhem land may possess a double-body.

In some stories, the Serpent is associated with a large fruit bat, sometimes called a "flying fox" in Australian English, engaged in a rivalry over a woman. Some scholars have identified other creatures, such as a bird, crocodile, dingo, or lizard, as taking the role of the Serpent in stories. In all cases, these animals are also associated with water. The Rainbow Serpent has also been identified with, or considered to be related to, the bunyip, a fearful, water-hole dwelling creature in Australian mythology.

Unlike many other deities, the Rainbow Serpent does not have a human form and remains in the form of animal. While each culture has a different interpretation on gender and which animal the deity is, it is nonetheless, always an animal.

The oftentimes inconsistent Rainbow Serpent (in contrast to the unyielding sun) replenishes the stores of water, forming gullies and deep channels as the Rainbow Serpent slithers across the landscape. In this belief system, without the Serpent, no rain would fall and the Earth would dry up. In other cultures, the serpent stops rainfall: the Numereji serpent's iwaiyu (its soul or shadow) cast upon the sky becomes the rainbow, and the serpent ascends to stop the rain, the Andrénjinyi is said to halt the rain caused by enemies.

The Rainbow Serpent is sometimes associated with human blood, especially circulation and the menstrual cycle, and is considered a healer, because of this the Rainbow Serpent is also representative of fertility.

Thunder and lightning are said to stem from when the Rainbow Serpent is angry, causing powerful storms and cyclones that will drown those who have upset her. Other punishments carried out by the Rainbow Serpent included being turned into either a human or to stone.

In the documentary film Crookhat and the Kulanada, directed by Anmatyerr man David Tranter, the three subjects relate stories of the serpent (Kulanada) guarding a waterhole fed by a spring in the Central Desert.

== Serpent stories ==
Stories about the Rainbow Serpent have been passed down from generation to generation. The serpent story may vary however, according to environmental differences. Peoples of the monsoonal areas depict an epic interaction of the sun, Serpent, and wind in their Dreamtime stories, whereas those of the Central Desert experience less drastic seasonal shifts and their stories reflect this. It is known both as a benevolent protector of its people (the groups from the country around) and as a malevolent punisher of law breakers. The Rainbow Serpent's mythology is closely linked to land, water, life, social relationships, and fertility. The Rainbow Serpent often takes part in transitions from adolescence to adulthood for young men and swallows them to vomit them up later.

The most common motif in Rainbow Serpent stories is the Serpent as creator, with the Serpent often bringing life to an empty space.

One prominent Rainbow Serpent myth is the story of the Wawalag or Wagilag sisters, from the Yolngu people of Arnhem Land. According to legend, the sisters are travelling together when the older sister gives birth, and her blood flows to a waterhole where the Rainbow Serpent lives. In another version of the tale, the sisters are travelling with their mother, Kunapipi, all of whom know ancient secrets, and the Serpent is merely angered by their presence in its area. The Rainbow Serpent then traces the scent back to the sisters sleeping in their hut, a metaphor for the uterus. The Rainbow Serpent enters, a symbolic representation of a snake entering a hole, and eats them and their children. However, the Rainbow Serpent regurgitates them after being bitten by an ant, and this act creates Arnhem Land. Now, the Serpent speaks in their voices and teaches sacred rituals to the people living there.

Wollunqua is the Warumungu people's version of the Rainbow Serpent, telling of an enormous snake which emerged from a watering hole called Kadjinara in the Murchison Ranges, Northern Territory.

Another story from the Northern Territory tells of how a great mother arrives from the sea, travelling across Australia and giving birth to the various Aboriginal peoples. In some versions, the great mother is accompanied by the Rainbow Serpent (or Lightning Snake), who brings the wet season of rains and floods.

From the Great Sandy Desert area in the northern part of Western Australia comes a story that explains how the Wolfe Creek Crater, or Kandimalal, was created by a star falling from heaven, creating a crater in which a Rainbow Serpent took up residence, though in some versions it is the Serpent which falls from heaven and creates the crater. The story sometimes continues telling of how an old hunter chased a dingo into the crater and got lost in a tunnel created by the Serpent, never to be found again, with the dingo being eaten and spat out by the Serpent.

The Noongar people of south-western Western Australia tell of how Rainbow Serpents, or Wagyls, smashed and pushed boulders around to form trails on Mount Matilda, along with creating waterways such as the Avon River. Some Aboriginal peoples in the Kimberley region believe that it was the Rainbow Serpent who deposited spirit-children throughout pools in which women become impregnated when they wade in the water. This process is sometimes referred to as "netting a fish".

A more child-friendly version of the Rainbow Serpent myth tells of how a serpent rose through the Earth to the surface, where she summoned frogs, tickled their bellies to release water to create pools and rivers, and is now known as the mother of life. Another tale is told in Dick Roughsey's children's book, which tells how the Rainbow Serpent creates the landscape of Australia by thrashing about and, by tricking and swallowing two boys, ends up creating the population of Australia by various animal, insect, and plant species.

== Iconography ==
The Serpent has been depicted in rock art in various forms, generally snake-like but sometimes with heads resembling various marsupials (macropods), flying foxes, or in some cases birds. Unlike a plain ordinary snake in rock art, the rainbow serpent may be depicted with appendages such as animal legs and feet or an unusual tail.

The Rainbow Serpent is also representative of Yams and water-lilies. Heavy rainfall brought an abundance of both to the land and there is rock art depicting the serpent as a "Yam Serpent". Other rock art depicts the Rainbow Serpent with a flying fox head or like attributes. On the Arnhem Plateau in Australia, there is also early art depicting the serpent as an urchin or "seaweed like." It is believed that early painting of the serpent had similar characteristics to that of a seahorse, for example, a curved body, long nose, and curved tail. All depictions of the Rainbow Serpent in rock art are very detailed and similar across Australia. The main regional differences found between the serpent rock art are in the tail of the serpent and the head of the serpent; some have 3 tails and others, a crocodile's tail.

== Possible origins in nature ==
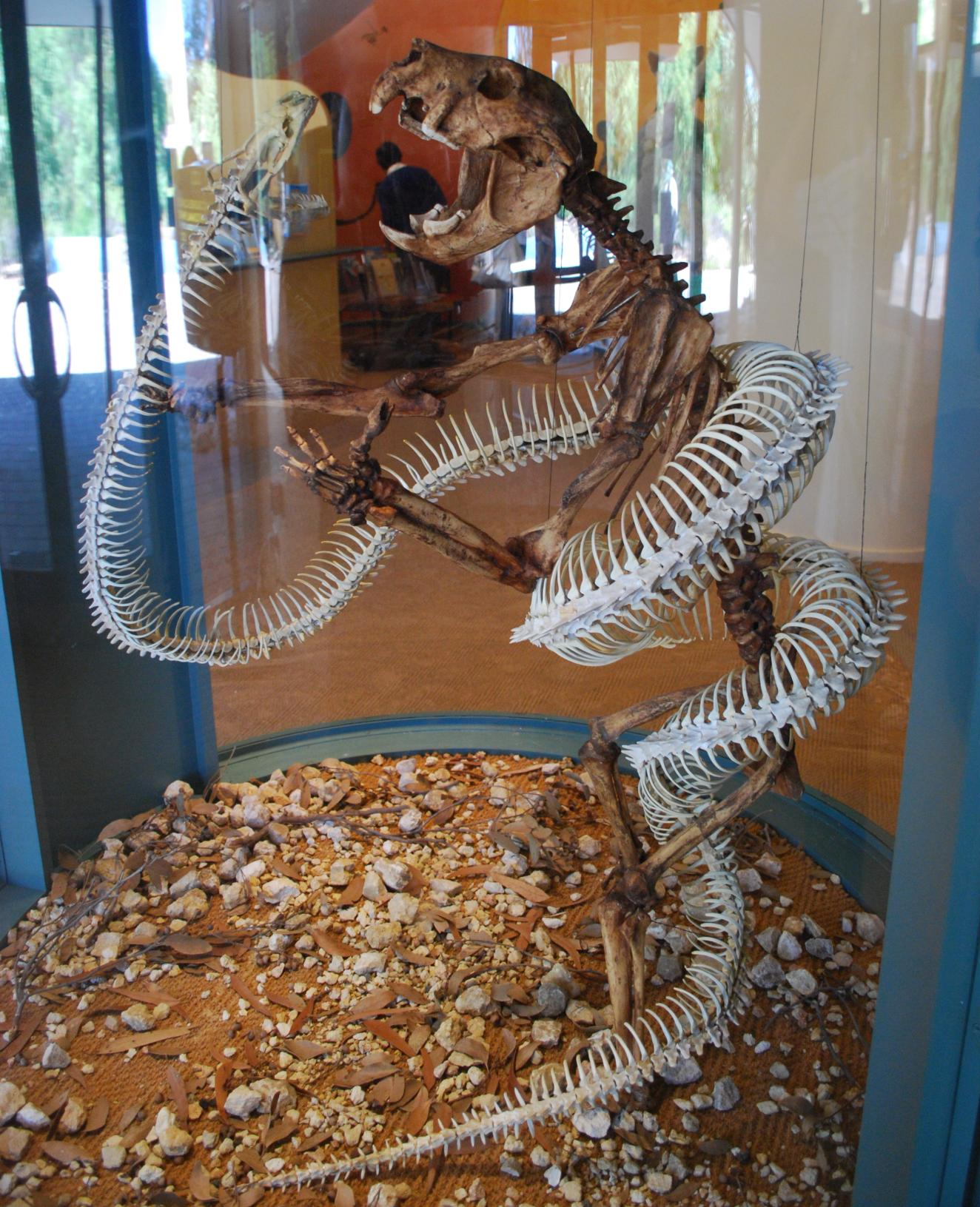
Wonambi naracoortensis and Thylacoleo

Various species/taxa of snakes in the natural world have been proposed as the model for the rainbow serpent.

One suggestion is that it is modelled on the "rock python", regarding the rainbow serpent in the myth of the Wawilak sisters among the Yolngu people. (Note: Knight, Chris (1983). Levi-Strauss and the Dragon: Mythologiques Reconsidered in the Light of an Australian Aboriginal Myth, p. 22. Quoted in Dooley (1995), pp. 67–68.) In some tellings of the sisters myth, the encounter with the Yurlunggur serpent occurs in its water-hole called the Mirrimina well, glossed as 'rock python's back'. Specifically, the banded rock python (aka Children's python; Liasis childreni syn. Antaresia childreni) has been identified with the Yurlunggur by one researcher. This species is of brown colour (cf. Yurlunggur described as "giant copper snake") flecked with darker patches and having a ventral side that is opalescent white.

Another suggestion is the Oenpelli rock python (aka Oenpelli python), which is called nawaran in the native Kunwinjku language, according to whose lore grew into the Ngalyod serpent. This snake is also brown with darker blotches with iridescent scales.

Another candidate is the water python (Liasis fuscus), which is a particularly colourful snake. (Note: Other suggestions from a televised source include the scrub or amethystine python, the taipan, and the file snake.)

The carpet snake (Morelia spilota variegata) is considered a form that the Rainbow Serpent can take by the Walmadjari people in northern Western Australia. The Kanmare or Kooremah of Queensland are also considered enormous carpet snakes, as already mentioned.

There are also some geologist that study and look at the Rainbow Serpent art in Australia who see many similarities between the Serpent and seahorses or pipefish. It's also been described as looking like a sea urchin or seaweed. Considering that the Aboriginal peoples are in Australia and surrounded by lush rainforest, tropical ocean, and great diversity, the origins of the Serpents form are varied.

Paleoherpetology

In Queensland, a fossil of a snake was found, and they believe that it came from the prehistoric family of large snakes that may have inspired the original Rainbow Serpent.

Wonambi is a genus that consisted of two species of very large snakes. These species were not pythons, like Australia's other large constrictors of the genus Morelia, and are currently classified in the extinct family Madtsoiidae that became extinct elsewhere in the world 55 million years in the past.

== Role in traditional culture ==
In addition to stories about the Rainbow Serpent being passed down from generation to generation, the Rainbow Serpent has been worshipped through rituals and has also inspired cultural artifacts such as artwork and songs, a tradition which continues today.

There are many ancient rituals associated with the Rainbow Serpent that are still practiced today. The myth of the Wawalag sisters of Arnhem Land in the Northern Territory marks the importance of the female menstruation process and led to the establishment of the Kunapipi blood ritual of the goddess, in which the Indigenous Australians allegorically recreate the Rainbow Serpent eating the Wawalag sisters through dance and pantomime, and can be regarded as a fertility ritual.

Female menstruation is sacred to many Indigenous Australian cultures because it distinguishes the time when a female is capable of bringing life into the world, putting a woman on the same level of creative abilities as the Rainbow Serpent. It is for this reason that men will attempt to mimic this holy process by cutting their arms and/or penises and letting their blood run over their own bodies, each other's bodies, and even into a woman's uterus. Men will sometimes mix their blood with a women's menstrual blood, letting them flow together in a ceremonial unification of the sexes.

The Rainbow Serpent is also identified as a healer and can pass on its properties as a healer to humans through a ritual.

== Parallels ==
The notion of "rainbow serpent" occurs world-wide, and the folkloristic motif-index A791.2. "Rainbow as snake" has been assigned to it. The rainbow serpent myth exists in West African among the Dahomeans (i.e., Fon people of present-day Benin Republic, cf. Ayida Wedo) and the Yoruba (cf. Oshunmare); in South America among Ashluslay people of the Gran Chaco, the Cumaná tribe (a speaker of the Chapacuran language family) of East Bolivia; and the Omagua people (of Brazil's Amazon basin). Parallels are also known among the native North Americans and Persians.

Robert Blust has documented beliefs about the rainbow in tribal societies around the world that closely resemble the Rainbow Serpent myth of Australia.

== Influence in modern culture ==
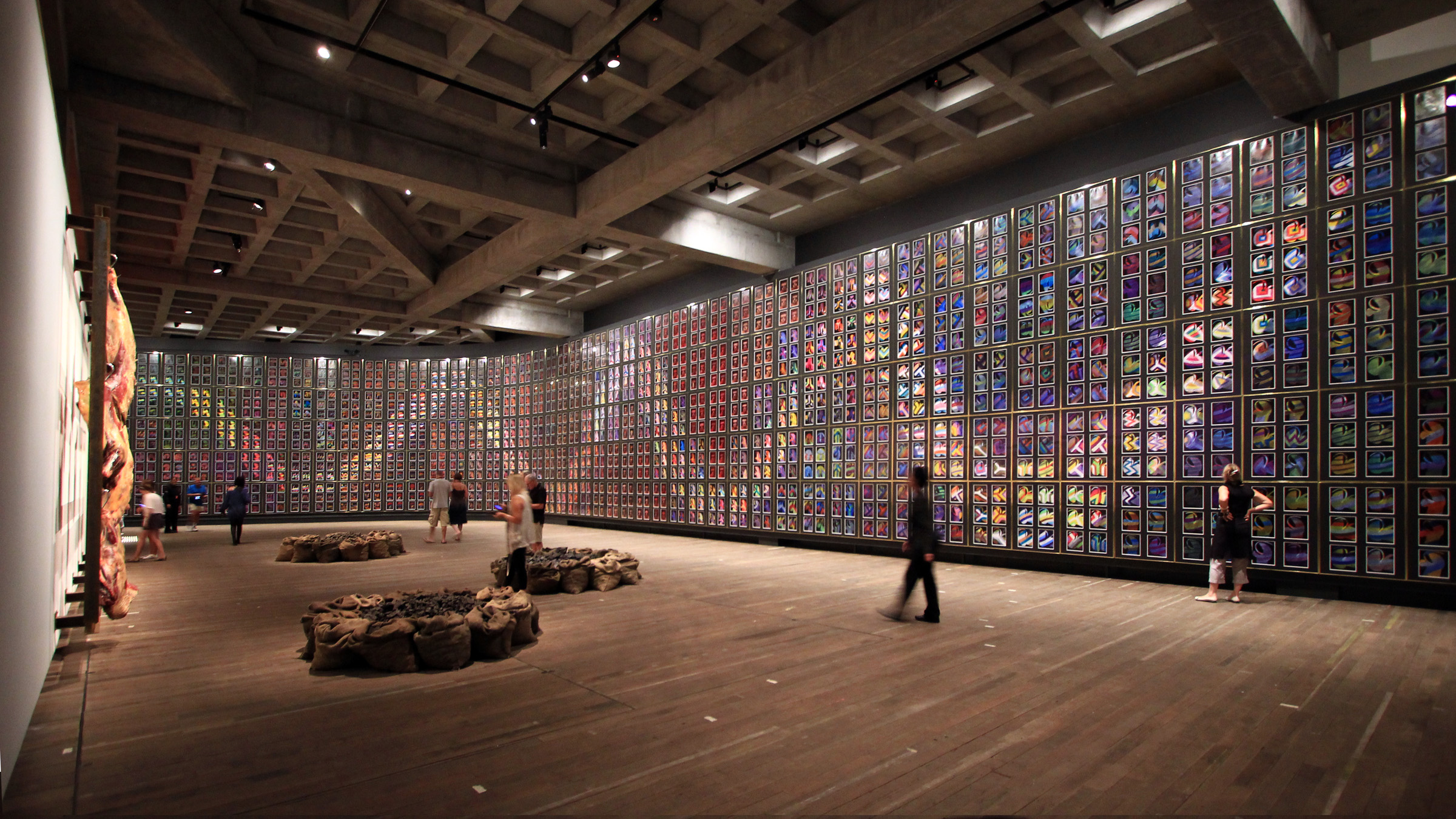
Sidney Nolan's Snake (1970–72), held at the Museum of Old and New Art in Hobart, is a giant Rainbow Serpent mural made of 1620 painted panels.

The Rainbow Serpent, in addition to the continuation of traditional beliefs is often referenced in modern culture by providing inspiration for art, film, literature, music, religion, and social movements. For example, The Rainbow Serpent Festival, an annual music festival in Australia, and the Rainbow Serpent Project, a series of films which document the filmmaker's journey to various sacred sites around the Earth, are both inspired and named after the creature.

Many Aboriginal Australian artists continue to be inspired by the Rainbow Serpent and use it as a subject in their art. An artist by the name of Belle Parker created a painted in the year 2000 called 'The Journey'. This painting combined the Rainbow Serpent with the Christian cross. She even won the Blake prize for this piece.

The Rainbow Serpent has also appeared as a character in literature. The Lardil people's Dreaming story of the Rainbow Serpent was retold in Dick Roughsey's award-winning Australian children's book The Rainbow Serpent; the Rainbow Serpent has also appeared as a character in comic books such as Hellblazer. The Rainbow Serpent, under the name Yurlungur, has featured as a demon or persona in several titles of the Megami Tensei series of Japanese role-playing games. The Rainbow Serpent has also appeared as an antagonistic character in the novel Eyes of the Rainbow Serpent.

The Rainbow Serpent can still serve a cultural role today, particularly for Aboriginal Australians. Some New Age religions and spirituality movements around the world have now also adopted the Rainbow Serpent as an icon.

Similarly, the Rainbow Serpent can inspire social movements. Art historian Georges Petitjean has suggested that the identification of the Rainbow Serpent with various genders and sexualities helps to explain why the rainbow flag has been adopted as the symbol of lesbian, gay, bisexual, (although this is just speculation and quite possibly untrue). Politically, for example, the Rainbow Serpent was adopted as the symbol of an anti-uranium mining campaign in Australia, using the notion that the mining would disturb the Serpent and cause it to seek revenge as a metaphor for environmental destruction.

== See also ==
- Serpent (symbolism)
- Australian Aboriginal mythology § Rainbow Serpent — Australian myths
  - Wirnpa — rainmaking serpent
  - Eingana – Aboriginal creator snake goddess
- Snake Worship § Rainbow serpents of Africa — African myths
  - Oshunmare

== Bibliography ==
- Brandenstein, Carl Georg von (1982), "Ch. 8. The Rainbow Mystery", Names and Substance in the Australian Subsection System, University of Chicago Press, pp. 62ff, ISBN 9780226864815
- Elkin, A. P. (December 1930), "The Rainbow-Serpent Myth in North-West Australia", Oceania, 1 (3): 349–352, doi:10.1002/j.1834-4461.1930.tb01655.x, JSTOR 40327333
- Elkin, A. P. (September 1961), "Maraian at Mainoru, 1949: II. An Interpretation", Oceania, 32 (1): 1–15, doi:10.1002/j.1834-4461.1961.tb00441.x, JSTOR 40329294
- Elkin, A. P.; Berndt, Catherine; Berndt, Ronald Murray (1950), Art in Arnhem Land, University of Chicago Press
- Elkin, A. P. (June 1952). "Cave-Paintings in Southern Arnhem Land". Oceania. 22 (4): 245–255. JSTOR 40328350.
- Lowenstein, John (1961), "Rainbow and Serpent", Anthropos, 56: 31–40
- Mountford, Charles P. (1978). "The Rainbow Serpents of Australia". In Buchler, Ira R.; Maddock, Kenneth (eds.). The Rainbow Serpent: A Chromatic Piece. Chicago: Mouton/Aldine. pp. 23–97. doi:10.1515/9783110807165.23. ISBN 9789027976802.
- Radcliffe-Brown, Alfred Reginald (1926). "The Rainbow-Serpent Myth of Australia". Journal of the Royal Anthropological Institute. 56: 19–25. doi:10.2307/2843596. JSTOR 2843596. (alt url @ books.google)
- Róheim, Géza (1951). "Mythology of Arnhem Land". American Imago. 8 (2). The Johns Hopkins University Press: 181–187. ISSN 0065-860X. JSTOR 26301306. PMID 14837890.
  - —— (2021). "Mythology of Arnhem Land". In Dundes, Alan (ed.). Princeton University Presse. Princeton University Press. pp. 139–147. ISBN 9780691234212.
- Roth, Walter Edmund (1903), "Superstitiion, Magic, and Medicine", Bulletins of North Queensland Ethnography, 5
- Taçon, Paul S. C.; Wilson, Meredith; Chippindale, Christopher (October 1996), "Birth of the Rainbow Serpent in Arnhem Land Rock Art and Oral History", Archaeology in Oceania, 31 (3, The Creation of Time): 103–124, doi:10.1002/j.1834-4453.1996.tb00355.x, JSTOR 40387039
- Taylor, Luke (June 1990), "The Rainbow Serpent as Visual Metaphor in Western Arnhem Land", Oceania, 60 (4, Special 60th Anniversary Issue): 329–344, doi:10.1002/j.1834-4461.1990.tb01559.x, JSTOR 0332450
- Warner, William Lloyd (1937), A Black Civilization: A Social Study of an Australian Tribe, Harper & Brothers
