= Wati-kutjara =

Mythological characters

In Western Australian Aboriginal mythology, the Wati kutjara (also Wati kutjarra or Wadi Gudjara) are two young lizard-men (totem: goanna) who, in the Dreaming, travelled all over the Western Desert. In English, their songline is often called the Two Men Dreaming. The Wati kutjara are ubiquitous in the mythology of the Western Desert; Their journey extends for thousands of kilometres, stretching from the Kimberley to South Australia.

== Narratives ==
Wati kutjara is one of the most important Dreamings around Balgo; in Kukatja narratives, the Wati kutjara are often likened to the wind, whose form they adopt when in danger. The men's first action is to sing about their names in order to establish their own identity. Then they decide to travel about, and eventually decide to head south-east in order to enlighten the people there who do not possess the rituals known to the Dreaming heroes. As they travel, they sing of the animals, plants and geographic features that they encounter, naming them and calling them into being. Filled with magical power, these two unmarried brothers eventually travelled all over the Western Desert destroying many dangerous evil spirits. They also created sacred objects.

The Wati kutjara feature in innumerable stories, whose details vary from region to region. In one recension, they are credited with castrating the Man in the Moon Kidili by throwing a magical boomerang, because he tried to rape the first woman. In other versions, the Wati kutjara are the ones attempting to seduce the same group of women.

== Art and literature ==
- Locations and events associated with the Wati kutjara are frequently the subject of Aboriginal Art from Balgo and its outstations.
- James Cowan's book Two men dreaming draws upon Wati kutjara narratives, although the place-names appear to have been disguised. (Note. This was done t protect the region, and the people concerned: author)

== See also ==
- Tingari, another major song-myth cycle from the Western Desert
- Inma board
