= Kidili =

In Australian aboriginal mythology (specifically: Mandjindja), Kidili (or Kidilli) was an ancient moon-man who attempted to rape some of the first women on Earth. The Wati-kutjara wounded him in battle, castrating him with a boomerang, and he died of his wounds in a waterhole. The women he was trying to rape became the Pleiades.
