= Tingari =

The Tingari (Tingarri) cycle in Australian Aboriginal mythology embodies a vast network of Aboriginal Dreaming (tjukurpa) songlines that traverse the Western Desert region of Australia. Locations and events associated with the Tingari cycle are frequently the subject of Aboriginal Art from the region (Perkins & Fink 2000).

== Narratives and itineraries ==
The Tingari Men were a group of ancestral elders who − in the Dreaming − travelled over vast areas of the Western Desert, performing rituals and creating or "opening up" the country (Perkins & Fink 2000:278) They were usually accompanied by recently initiated novices to whom they provided instruction in the ritual and law of the region (Myers 1986:59-64). The adventures of the Tingari groups are enshrined in numerous song-myth cycles which provide explanations for contemporary customs in Western Desert aboriginal life (Perkins & Fink 2000:278; Berndt 1970:222-223; Berndt & Berndt 1996:266-267). Deep knowledge of Tingari business is restricted to men possessing appropriate levels of seniority in Western Desert society, but many stories have "public versions" which do not disclose secret/sacred knowledge.

In the Tingari heartland of the Gibson Desert, three major journey-lines can be discerned (Myers 1986:62). One begins west of Jupiter Well and eventually runs due east, concluding south-east of Lake Mackay; another heads south-west from near Kintore for some 200 km, and then doubles back to end at Lake Macdonald; the third runs from south to north through Docker River and Kintore. At the many sites that make up these songlines, groups of Tingari people held ceremonies, experienced adversity and had adventures, in the course of which they either created or became the physical features of the sites involved. In mythological terms, Tingari exploits often add to or modify features at pre-existing sites, or revive and extend more ancient local Dreamings (Kimber 2000:273). The oral narratives that describe these adventures stretch to thousands of verses, and provide countless topographical details that would assist nomadic bands to navigate and survive in the arid landscape (Petri 1970:263).

In Pintupi narratives, the male Tingari groups are usually followed by groups of women who may be accompanied by children. The more public women's stories usually revolve around the gathering and preparation of bush foods (Perkins & Fink 2000:281-290). However, other narratives relate to a group of powerful ancestor women – the Kanaputa (Ganabuda) or Mungamunga (Berndt 1972:208; Poirier 2005:130) – who often travelled in a Tingari ritual group (Myers 1976:188). These Tingari women were sometimes accompanied by young girls, whom they provided with ritual education (Berndt 1970:225), and were often followed by (or following) groups of Tingari men. Many of the Kukatja stories collected at Balgo relate to the Kanaputa (Berndt 1970:222; Poirier 2005:77-79).

== Art ==
Tingari-related visual designs, such as those used in ceremonial body and ground paintings, are usually considered "dear" rather than "dangerous" by traditional owners, which may explain why so many artists have concentrated on the Tingari in paintings produced for public display and sale by Papunya Tula (Myers 1989:179). Even so, the more esoteric elements of these designs were usually modified or omitted by the artists (Myers 2002:64-66), and this is particularly true of recent works. "Classical" Tingari cycle paintings typically contain a network of roundels (concentric circles, which often signify sites) interlinked by lines (which often indicate travel) (Bardon 1991:66, 85-86, 94, 128; Perkins & Fink 2000:180-181, 229).

== See also ==
- Wati kutjara, another major song-myth cycle from the Western Desert
