= Inma board =

Australian Aboriginal mystic object

Within the context of Australian Aboriginal mythology, an inma board is a sacred soul-board of a number of desert peoples, which are said to connect each individual to his ancestors, and to the song and dreaming of his ancestors, as well as being magic weapons. According to communities of the Western Desert, the sacred inma board called by the ancestors as Wati-kutjara is represented by the dark patches of the Milky Way (pulina-pulina), between the constellations of Centaurus and Cygnus. The inma board was made and flung into the heavens, as sung in the following song verse:

Pulina-pulina kaduana wanala rawu janani warai.
