= Arkaroo =

Serpent in Australian Aboriginal mythology

In the dreamtime of Australian Aboriginal mythology, the Arkaroo is a serpent who drank all the waters of Lake Frome in South Australia, the latter remaining a large salt pan most of the time. Heavily filled and tired, the Arkaroo retracted for a nap into the mountains west, carving by his body the valleys of what is known today as the Gammon Ranges in the northern Flinders Ranges. He was attacked by other mystic beasts and let water on his rests, each position resulting in a waterhole, such as that of Arkaroola Springs and others. Today as in ancient times, rumblings of the Arkaroo can be heard in the mountains, which are scientifically explained by the seismic activity of the ranges.

The Arkaroo has given origin of name to places in this region, namely Arkaroola Village, Arkaroola Creek, Arkaroola Springs and the Arkaroo Rock in Wilpena Pound.
