= Australian Institute of Aboriginal and Torres Strait Islander Studies =

Coordinates: 35.2926°S 149.1185°E

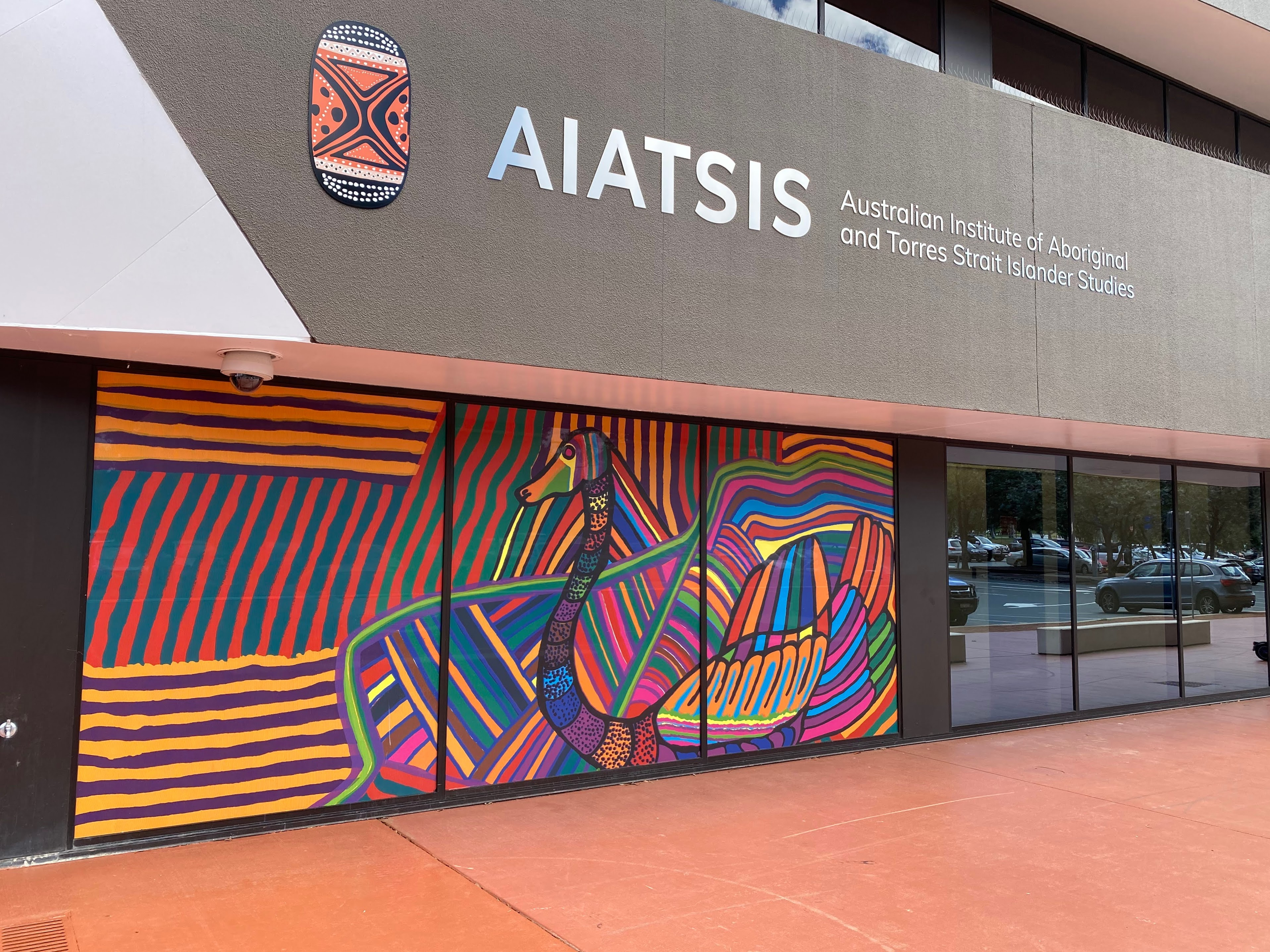
- The AIATSIS building in 2023
- Established: 1964
- Location: Acton, Australian Capital Territory, Australia
- CEO: Leonard Hill
- Chairperson: Jodie Sizer
- Website: aiatsis.gov.au

The Australian Institute of Aboriginal and Torres Strait Islander Studies (AIATSIS), established as the Australian Institute of Aboriginal Studies (AIAS) in 1964, is an independent Australian Government statutory authority. It is a collecting, publishing, and research institute and is considered to be Australia's premier resource for information about the cultures and societies of Aboriginal and Torres Strait Islander peoples.

The institute is a leader in ethical research and the handling of culturally sensitive material. The collection at AIATSIS has been built through over 50 years of research and engagement with Aboriginal and Torres Strait Islander communities and is now a source of language and culture revitalisation, native title research, and Indigenous family and community history. AIATSIS is located on Acton Peninsula in Canberra, Australian Capital Territory.

== History ==
=== The proposal and interim council (1959–1964) ===
In the late 1950s, there was an increasing focus on the global need for anthropological research into 'disappearing cultures'. This trend was also emerging in Australia in the work of researchers of Aboriginal and Torres Strait Islander peoples, leading to a proposal by W.C. Wentworth MP for the conception of an Australian Institute of Aboriginal Studies (AIAS) in 1959.

The proposal was made as a submission to Cabinet, and argued for a more comprehensive approach by the Australian Government to the recording of Australian Aboriginal and Torres Strait Islander peoples and cultures.

In 1960, a Cabinet sub-committee assessed the proposal and formed a working party at the Australian National University (ANU) to consider the viability of the proposal. One of their first actions was to appoint W.E.H. Stanner to organise a conference on the state of Aboriginal Studies in Australia, to be held in 1961 at the ANU.

Academics and anthropologists in the field of Aboriginal Studies attended the conference, and contributed research papers published in a conference report in 1963. No Aboriginal people were present at the conference.

The Prime Minister at the time, Robert Menzies, appointed an Interim Council in 1961. The role of the Interim Council was to plan for a national Aboriginal research organisation and establish how this organisation would interact with existing research and scientific bodies. The Interim Council was also tasked with immediately developing a programme that would identify and address urgent research needs.

The Interim Council consisted of 16 members and was chaired by Deputy Vice-Chancellor of the ANU, Professor A. D. Trendall, officially recognised as the first chair of the institute now known as AIATSIS.

In August 1962, a draft constitution for the institute was submitted to the Menzies government, and rejected. The Interim Council completed a revised constitution in July 1963. Amendments to the document included the change from the title 'director' to 'principal' of the institute.

This version of the constitution would go on to form the basis for the creation of the new Australian Institute for Aboriginal Studies the following year.

=== AIAS early years (1964–1970) ===
The Australian Institute of Aboriginal Studies was established as a statutory authority under an Act of Parliament in June 1964. The mission of the Institute at that time has been described as "to record language, song, art, material culture, ceremonial life and social structure before those traditions perished in the face of European ways".

This notion is also reflected in the Institute's official functions, as recorded in the Reading of the Bill in Parliament. These were:

1. to sponsor and to foster research of a scientific nature on the Australian Aborigines.
2. to treat as a matter of urgency those studies for which the source materials are disappearing.
3. to establish and conduct a documentation centre on the Aborigines, and a library of books, manuscripts and other relevant material, both for the use of scholars and for public education.
4. to encourage co-operation with and between scholars in universities, museums, and other institutions engaged in studies of the Aborigines, and with appropriate private bodies.
5. to publish and to support the publication of the results of research.
6. to co-operate with appropriate bodies concerning the financing of research, the preservation of sites, and the collection of records.
7. to promote as and when necessary the training of research workers.
8. to establish and maintain relations with relevant international bodies.

AIAS had a twenty-two member Council, composed mainly of academics, and had a foundation membership of one hundred. The founding Principal of the newly formed institute was Frederick McCarthy, a professional anthropologist and graduate of Sydney University who had spent nearly 30 years working in the field.

The creation of the AIAS provided an opportunity for greater cross-discipline interaction in fields relating to Aboriginal and Torres Strait Islander studies in Australia.

The Institute's founding principal, Fred McCarthy, was an advocate of film as an important part of research methodology as early as his tenure as curator of anthropology at the Australian Museum in Sydney in the 1940s. This was evident in the contributions he made during his involvement in establishing the AIAS and also as its principal, in continuing to support the development of the AIAS Film Unit and championing ethnographic film in global forums.

In the early years of the AIAS, the Film Unit largely outsourced early filmmaking work to other companies, or worked in collaboration with the Commonwealth Film Unit (as early as 1962). But over the next 30 years, the Film Unit would go on to produce "one of the largest assembly of ethnographic films created in the world".

In keeping with the AIAS official function "to publish and to support the publication of the results of research", a publishing arm of the institute was established in 1964. Publishing under the name Australian Institute of Aboriginal Studies, the publishing arm released a range of papers and research findings, including in the fields of linguistics, demography, physical anthropology, history and musicology.

The early work of the AIAS is credited with increasing interaction between academics in different fields, as well as establishing the foundations for the extensive collections AIATSIS holds today. But before 1970, there had never been an Aboriginal or Torres Strait Islander member on the AIAS Council.

=== Self-determination and the Institute (1970–1989) ===
"Money and other resources are in short supply for Aboriginal control of their livelihood, but not, it seems, for discussing it." – Eaglehawk and Crow letter, 29 March 1974

The 1970s marked a period of change for the AIAS. This began with the appointment of the first Aboriginal member of the AIAS Council in 1970. Phillip Roberts, an Alawa man, served on the council from September 1970 until June 1972.

This was followed in 1971 with a second Aboriginal Council member, Senator Neville Bonner, who served on Council until 1974 and for a second term in the late 1970s. And again in 1972, with the appointment of Dick Roughsey to replace Phillip Roberts at the end of his term.

The appointment of Phillip Roberts to the Council reflected a growing pressure for an increase in Aboriginal representation within the institute. But the move did not allay the belief held by some Aboriginal activists that the AIAS was engaging in 'tokenism' in the extent to which Aboriginal people were involved in the administration of Aboriginal Studies.

The changes to the Institute that would take place in the following decade were also influenced by the shifting social and political landscape in Australia. The Aboriginal rights movement was growing and Aboriginal people were demanding a voice on Council, consultation with communities and an increased focus on projects relevant to the needs of Indigenous people.

In 1972, the Whitlam government was elected. Their policy of self-determination for Aboriginal people echoed calls for greater Aboriginal involvement in the administration and functions of the AIAS. The new government was also responsible for a significant boost to AIAS funding.

The appointment of Peter Ucko in 1972 as Principal of the AIAS has since been described as the beginning of an increase in involvement of Aboriginal people in the workings of the institute.

In his time as Principal, Ucko was responsible for implementing a policy later labelled "Aboriginalisation", which was aimed at opening up the institute to Aboriginal involvement and representation. This policy was influenced by a document circulated in 1974, called the Eaglehawk and Crow letter, which criticised the current model of academic research. The letter asserted that anthropologists "should not pretend that their studies are objective when the overwhelming factor in the lives of Aborigines is our oppression by the society of which the anthropologist is, to a greater or lesser extent, a part of." Its authors called for increased participation of Aboriginal people in the running of the Institute and for greater control over commissioning and funding of research into their cultures.

The policy and structural changes to the Institute continued throughout the 1970s.

The Aboriginal Advisory Committee was established in 1975, and consisted of the six Aboriginal members of the AIAS Council. Early recommendations including increased representation of Aboriginal people on committees and the AIAS Council as well as employment at the institute. The committee was renamed in 1978, to Aboriginal and Torres Strait Islander Advisory Committee.

In 1975–1976, a category of research grants for Aboriginal researchers was introduced. The emergence of Aboriginal and Torres Strait Islander people filling the role of 'cultural practitioner', travelling to the AIAS to provide advice on projects and research being undertaken, was also documented from around 1976 onwards.

The time Peter Ucko spent as Principal of the AIAS saw a phase of "rapid expansion" for the institute.

The AIAS Film Unit that had operated in Sydney until 1973 was re-established in Canberra in 1975. Prominent American-born ethnographic filmmaker David MacDougall was appointed the Director of this new AIAS Film Unit. With his wife and filmmaking partner Judith MacDougall and Kim McKenzie, the Film Unit operated until 1988 when its functions were absorbed back into the institute.

During the MacDougall/McKenzie era, a new style of ethnographic film was explored. One that moved away from film as a scientific record in favour of telling the story of individuals lives. The filmmakers also practised a more collaborative approach to their films, and chose to use translations and subtitles to give direct access to the subjects voice and thoughts rather than the dominant 'voice of god' narration style.

One of the most notable films produced towards the end of this period was Waiting for Harry, a prize-winning film directed by Kim McKenzie with anthropologist Les Hiatt and now considered to exemplify the "style of collaborative filmmaking" the Film Unit favoured in their work.

The power of film to "influence opinion" was becoming increasingly recognised and with this, the lack of representation of Aboriginal people telling their own stories. In 1978, a meeting chaired by prominent activist and academic Marcia Langton expressed these concerns, arguing for greater access to film and video in Aboriginal communities, and training in film production by the AIAS.

By the following year, the AIAS Film Unit had begun to implement a training program and had started employing trainee Aboriginal filmmakers on productions by the early 1980s.

The AIAS began presenting a biennial Wentworth Lecture in 1978, named as a tribute to W.C. Wentworth for his role in establishing the institute. The lecture is presented by prominent person with knowledge or experience relating to issues affecting Aboriginal and Torres Strait Islander peoples in Australia today.

The expansion of the Institute continued into the 1980s. The Aboriginal Studies Press began publishing the Australian Aboriginal Studies Journal in 1983, a peer-reviewed journal aimed at "promoting high-quality research in Australian Indigenous studies".

In 1982, the AIAS established a task force that identified the prevailing need for further 'Aboriginalisation' of the Institute's workforce. At the time, there were four Aboriginal staff members, making up around 7% of the total staff. This was followed in 1985 with the creation of the role of Aboriginal Studies Coordination Officer within the AIAS, whose responsibilities involved improving access for Aboriginal people to the research and resources of the institute.

The After 200 Years project was launched in 1985, aiming to fill some of the gaps in the AIAS photographic collection; particularly images of daily life in the southern, urban parts of Australia. Aboriginal involvement in selecting subject matter, photographing and documenting the collection was a major part of the project. The three-year project culminated in the publication of a book containing hundreds of photographs of Aboriginal and Torres Strait Islander people, and selected by them to represent their community.

The Rock Art Protection Program (RAPP) commenced in 1986 following a request for such an initiative by the then Minister of Aboriginal Affairs Clyde Holding. The aim of the RAPP was to protect Australian Indigenous rock art. Grants were approved by the institute to fund various projects related to rock art protection.

The collections were also expanding, and by 1987 the AIATSIS library encompassed the print collections, a special Bibliographic Section and the Resource Centre (which contained the Institute's audiovisual materials).

Between 1987 and 1989, the survival of the AIAS as an independent statutory body was tied to a proposal for a new statutory commission that would take over all aspects of the Aboriginal Affairs portfolio. This commission would become the Aboriginal and Torres Strait Islander Commission (ATSIC), conceived in an Act of Parliament in 1989. The AIAS would not be folded into this commission; instead it would be recreated under a new Act with a new name.

=== AIATSIS (1989) ===
The Australian Institute of Aboriginal and Torres Strait Islander Studies (AIATSIS) Act was passed by parliament in 1989, replacing the AIAS Act. The newly established AIATSIS had a reduced Council consisting of nine members, with the AIATSIS Act specifying that Aboriginal and Torres Strait Islander people hold a minimum of five of these Council positions.

The new Act also established a Research Advisory Committee, to assess research applications and advise the council.

The Aboriginal Studies Press published their best-selling Aboriginal Australia map in 1996, based on research conducted for the Encyclopaedia of Aboriginal Australia, edited by David Horton.

=== 2001 – present ===
In 2001, the Institute launched a two-year Library Digitisation Pilot Program (LDPP). Among the items digitised, catalogued and made available online were 267 volumes of the Dawn and New Dawn magazines held in the AIATSIS collection. AIATSIS also distributed over 2000 free copies of these magazines on CD-Rom, to Indigenous organisations, schools and libraries in New South Wales. Throughout this period, AIATSIS continued to undertake projects focused on the digitisation of collection materials, including their holdings of the complete back catalogue of Koori Mail. This involved scanning over 35,000 pages from 500 editions of the newspaper, with searchable copies launched on the AIATSIS website in partnership with Koori Mail in 2011.

As part of their research functions, AIATSIS also initiated a number of public programs and research related events during this time that are still run today. The institute has convened the National Indigenous Studies Conference every two years since 2001 and the National Native Title Conference every year since 2002.

The After 200 Years photographic project was revisited in 2014 with an exhibition of images at Parliament House, Canberra, to coincide with AIATSIS' 50-year anniversary.

In 2020, following consultation with the United Ngunnawal Elders Council and the Winanggaay Ngunnawal Language Group, the AIATSIS building in Acton was officially named Maraga, which means a strong shield.

On 2 February 2024, coinciding with its 60th anniversary, AIATSIS opened a new facility in Mparntwe-Alice Springs, building on its long partnership with First Nations Media Australia, which is based in the city. AIATSIS staff, six of whom are Indigenous locals (of seven in total; intended to grow to up to 24) located at the new centre will work closely with local people to take care of the cultural heritage from the region. There is a dedicated ancestry section in the new centre, which before its completion was referred to as AIATSIS Alice Springs Engagement and Digitisation Centre and is now officially known as AIATSIS Central Australia. The centre will be run in collaboration with the Northern Territory Government, and allow access to AIATSIS materials for people living in Central Australia. An exhibition titled To Know, To Respect, To Care is on at the centre until 14 June 2024. The official opening was attended by Linda Burney, the Minister for Indigenous Australians, and NT Minister for Arts, Culture and Heritage Chansey Paech.

== Governance ==
=== Acts of parliament ===
AIATSIS is an Australian Government statutory authority established under the Public Governance, Performance and Accountability Act 2013. As of 2024 it is under the portfolio of the Department of the Prime Minister and Cabinet, and Hon Linda Burney, Minister for Indigenous Australians, is the responsible minister.

The organisation operates under several acts of parliament, the most important of which are the Australian Institute of Aboriginal and Torres Strait Islander Studies Act 1989, which established the purpose and functions of AIATSIS, and a 2016 amendment, the Australian Institute of Aboriginal and Torres Strait Islander Studies Amendment Act 2016.

The main functions of AIATSIS under the Act are:

1. to undertake and promote Aboriginal and Torres Strait Islander studies;
2. to publish the results of Aboriginal and Torres Strait Islander studies and to assist in the publication of the results of such studies;
3. to conduct research in fields relevant to Aboriginal and Torres Strait Islander studies and to encourage other persons or bodies to conduct such research;
4. to assist in training persons, particularly Aboriginal persons and Torres Strait Islanders, as research workers in fields relevant to Aboriginal and Torres Strait Islander studies;
5. to establish and maintain a cultural resource collection consisting of materials relating to Aboriginal and Torres Strait Islander studies;
6. to encourage understanding, in the general community, of Aboriginal and Torres Strait Islander societies.

=== Council ===
The AIATSIS Council is a governing body designed to oversee and steer the functions and direction of the institute. The role and responsibilities of the council are mandated in the AIATSIS Act 1989.

The Council consists of nine members; four are elected by the institute's membership and five appointed by the Minister. According to the AIATSIS Act 1989, one person appointed by the Minister must be a Torres Strait Islander and the four other people appointed by the Minister must be Aboriginal persons or Torres Strait Islanders. The four Council members elected by the Institute's membership must be members themselves.

Chairs past and present include:

- A.D. Trendall, 1961–1966
- Neil William George Macintosh, 1966–1974 (professor of anatomy and anthropologist)
- Les Hiatt, 1974–1982
- John Mulvaney, 1982–1984
- Ken Colbung AM MBE, 1984–1990 (first Aboriginal chair, a Nyoongar elder)
- Marcia Langton AM, 1992–1998 (first Aboriginal woman chair)
- Mick Dodson AM, 1999–2017
- Michael McDaniel, 2017–2019 (held various academic positions, including Director of Indigenous Studies at Macquarie University, Dean of Indigenous Education at Western Sydney University, and pro-vice chancellor, Indigenous leadership and engagement, at the University of Technology Sydney)
- Jodie Sizer, 2019–present (as of February 2024, a Djap Wurrung/Gunditjmara woman from Framlingham in south-west Victoria

=== Committees ===
Various advisory committees exist to assist the Council as well as the chief executive officer (CEO). As of February 2024, these are: Council committees:

- Audit and Risk Committee
- Collections Advisory Committee
- Foundation Board
- Membership Standing Committee

CEO committees:

- Consultative Committee
- Health and Safety Committee
- Indigenous Caucus
- Languages Advisory Committee
- Native Title Research Advisory Committee (NTRAC)
- Publishing Advisory Committee (PAC)
- Research Advisory Committee (RAC)
- Research Ethics Committee (REC)

The Indigenous Caucus is a working group providing a forum for Aboriginal and Torres Strait Islander staff to meet and discuss workplace issues. Membership is voluntary, and the group is consulted on a range of issues, including progress towards cultural competency within the organisation; recruitment; tender and consultancy appointments; planning workshops; leading relevant policy and procedure development; promotion of AIATSIS in relevant forums; providing cultural knowledge on various issues; and running public forums. The Indigenous Caucus was revitalised in 2003–2004 and contributed to the development of policies and procedures in that year, notably AIATSIS' Indigenous Training and Career Development Plan. In 2013, the Indigenous Caucus developed a formal Service Charter and elected an Executive consisting of three members.

The Native Title Research Advisory Committee (NTRAC) provides advice to the CEO on the research program of the Native Title Research Unit.

The Research Advisory Committee (RAC) is responsible for assessing and advising on AIATSIS research projects and programs, including research grants. RAC functions are established in the AIATSIS Act.

The Research Ethics Committee (REC) is responsible for advising AIATSIS on the ethics of the research proposals by staff or grantees of AIATSIS, as well as research carried out through the Institute's external collaborations. The roles in the Research Ethics Committee are based on the National Statement published by the National Health and Medical Research Council.

The Publishing Advisory Committee (PAC) includes members with a range of expertise and credentials (including Indigenous community and language knowledge, research, writing, publishing) and jointly with Aboriginal Studies Press staff, consider and make recommendations to the CEO about manuscripts submitted for publication.

=== Staff ===
Leonard Hill is the Chief Executive Officer of AIATSIS

== Research ==
=== Overview ===
The AIATSIS Act sets the organisation the task of conducting, facilitating and promoting research in Aboriginal and Torres Strait Islander Studies and training Indigenous researchers. For over 50 years, AIATSIS has conducted research across a range of areas of study relevant to Indigenous peoples, culture, heritage, knowledge and experiences. This has led to a diverse research history; from languages and archaeological research, land rights, and political engagement, to contemporary topics in health and commerce.

The AIATSIS collections not only contain priceless records of Australia's Indigenous cultural heritage, but provide a significant national and international research infrastructure for research by, for and about Aboriginal and Torres Strait Islander peoples.

AIATSIS is one of Australia's Publicly Funded Research Agencies (PFRA), alongside organisations such as CSIRO and the Australian Institute of Marine Science. AIATSIS is Australia's only non-science PFRA.

Currently AIATSIS undertakes research in six priority areas.

- Native Title and traditional ownership
- Land and Water
- Governance development and public policy
- Languages and Cultural Expression
- Health and Wellbeing
- Education and cultural transmission

=== Ethical research ===
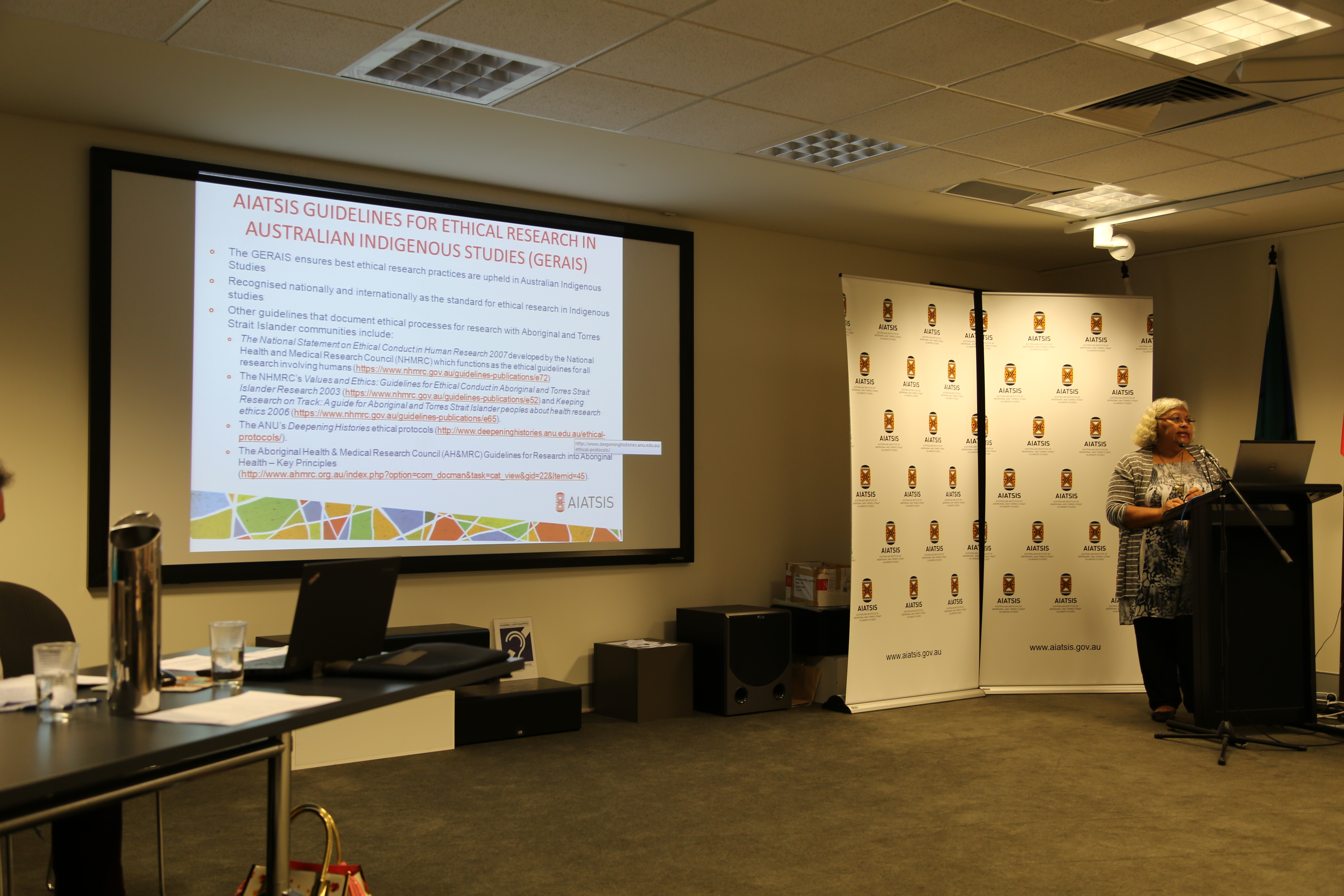
Chrissy Grant, chair of the AIATSIS Research Ethics Committee, running a GERAIS workshop in 2015

The institute is a leader in ethical research and the handling of culturally sensitive material. and holds in its collections many unique and irreplaceable items of cultural, historical and spiritual significance. AIATSIS published the Guidelines for Ethical Research in Australian Indigenous Studies (referred to as GERAIS) in 1999. This was a document considered to be the leading ethics guidelines for conducting research in and with Indigenous communities in Australia. GERAIS was regularly revised and significantly updated in 2012.

GERAIS was replaced in 2020 by AIATSIS Code of Ethics for Aboriginal and Torres Strait Islander Research (the AIATSIS Code), which supersedes GERAIS. Accompanying it is "A Guide to applying The AIATSIS Code of Ethics for Aboriginal and Torres Strait Islander Research". The AIATSIS Code is based on four principles:

1. Indigenous self-determination
2. Indigenous leadership
3. Impact and value
4. Sustainability and accountability

In 2013, AIATSIS was involved in the review of two National Health and Medical Research Council research ethics guidelines relating to Aboriginal and Torres Strait Islander health research.

=== Native title research ===
AIATSIS began undertaking native title research activities through the Native Title Research Unit in 1993, following the 1992 Mabo v Queensland High Court decision. Native Title research at AIATSIS is primarily funded through the Department of the Prime Minister and Cabinet but research has also been conducted in partnership with other departments and organisations, including the Australian National University, the Australian Conservation Foundation, and the Federal Court of Australia.

The Native Title Research Advisory Committee, the Research Advisory Committee, and the AIATSIS Council oversee the work conducted in Native Title and traditional ownership research at AIATSIS.

AIATSIS conducts a range of research projects relating to Native Title and traditional ownership, including Native Title and cultural heritage, Native Title and fresh and sea water, and Prescribed Body Corporates.

The role of Native Title research at AIATSIS is to monitor outcomes of Native Title and through research and study, provide advice on Native Title policy development. The Institute publishes a range of materials relating to Native Title including books, discussion papers, research reports and a Native Title Newsletter.

AIATSIS also provides a Native Title Research and Access Officer, who is responsible for assisting Native Title claimants to access materials from the AIATSIS collections in support of their claim.

Up until 2019, AIATSIS also contributed to Native Title policy and research by co-organising the Annual National Native Title Conference. However, in 2020, during the COVID-19 pandemic in Australia, the conference was cancelled, and in 2021 it merged with the National Indigenous Research Conference, creating a five-day event known as the AIATSIS Summit.

=== Family history research ===
AIATSIS publishes a number of resources for anyone wishing to undertake research into their own family history.

The Family History kit is aimed at providing the basics for tracing Aboriginal and Torres Strait Islander heritage. It contains guides to AIATSIS' own resources, including the Aboriginal and Torres Strait Islander Biographical Index (ABI) and digitised collection materials, as well as guides to external resources that may help with family history research.

General guidance is also provided regarding research resources specific to Indigenous family history research, historical name conventions and usage and confirmation of Aboriginal and Torres Strait Islander heritage.

AIATSIS also provides research support to Link-Up case workers and researchers around Australia, who are assisting members of the Stolen Generations to reconnect with their family and heritage.

== Publishing ==
=== Aboriginal Studies Press ===
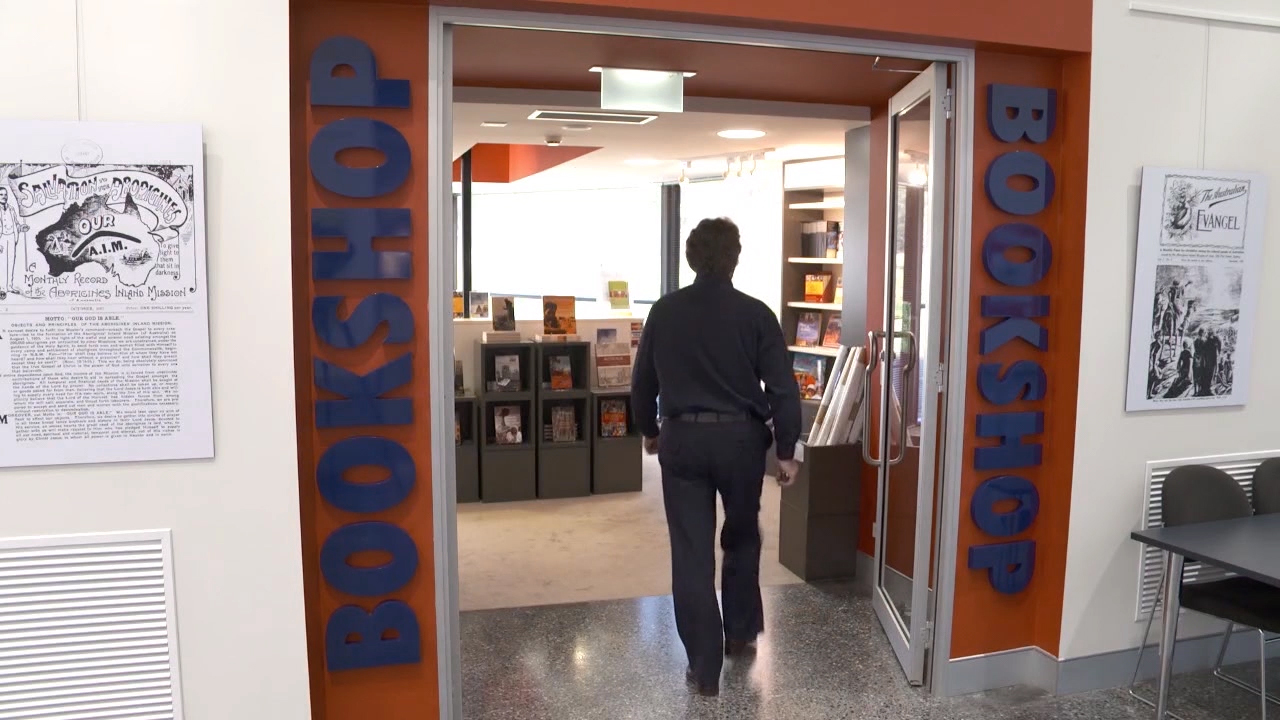
A customer enters the Aboriginal Studies Press bookshop at AIATSIS.

In keeping with its mandated functions, AIATSIS publishes the results of Aboriginal and Torres Strait Islander Studies through their publishing arm, Aboriginal Studies Press (ASP). The Institute began publishing in 1962 with A demographic survey of the Aboriginal population of the Northern Territory, with special reference to Bathurst Island Mission. This and other early publications were released under the imprint Australian Institute of Aboriginal Studies, the former title of AIATSIS. The ASP publishing imprint was trademarked in 2002, but was operating as the publishing arm of AIATSIS as early as the publication of Helen Ross' Just For Living in 1987.

The AIATSIS Research Publications became an imprint in 2011 and its stated purpose is to publish scholarly research that is derived from the AIATSIS Research Program. All Aboriginal Studies Press-branded titles are peer-reviewed and the majority are published concurrently in print and several ebook formats. The first phone app was published in 2013, and was shortlisted for the 2013 Mobile Awards.

Titles published by ASP have included research reports, monographs, biographies, autobiographies, family and community histories, and children's books. Since 2005 the list has aligned more closely with the Institute's research focus. Most publications derive from academic research, some funded by AIATSIS. ASP publishes books by both Aboriginal and Torres Strait Islander and non-Indigenous authors who are writing in the field of Aboriginal and Torres Strait Islander Studies. In some cases Aboriginal authors, like Doreen Kartinyeri and Joan Martin, have chosen to write in collaboration with non-Aboriginal oral historians.

The Publishing Advisory Committee makes recommendations to the AIATSIS Principal and Aboriginal Studies Press about which manuscripts to publish from those submitted. It has relationships with distributors and resellers for both national and international print and ebook distribution.

=== Notable publications ===
Australian Aboriginal Studies (AAS) is a multidiscplinary peer-reviewed journal published biannually by the Aboriginal Studies Press, published since 1983. Each issue contains scholarly articles, research reports and book reviews. Full text is available by subscription or via state libraries in Informit's APAFT (Australian Public Affairs Full Text) database and Indigenous Collection, and it is indexed or abstracted by the following services: AIATSIS Indigenous Studies Bibliography; EBSCO Academic Search Complete and Australia/New Zealand Reference Centre; and ProQuest.

Cleared Out (2005) won two Western Australian Premier's Book Awards and inspired the multi-award-winning documentary film, Contact. The creation of both the book and film reflect strong family and community engagement.

The Little Red Yellow Black Bookoriginally published in 1994 and now in its fourth edition (September 2018) is available online. was shortlisted with its companion website in the Australian Publishers Association Educational Awards, and is a widely recognised as an educational and cross-cultural training resource.

Another widely used resource published by Aboriginal Studies Press is the Aboriginal Australia map, created by David Horton. The Aboriginal Australia map represents the general locations of larger groupings of Aboriginal people, using research that was conducted during the development of The Encyclopaedia of Aboriginal Australia, which was another significant ASP publication. Previous milestone publications included the book After 200 Years, a collaboration showcasing photographs and stories of Aboriginal people as selected by members of those communities. Both books are now out of print and only available in libraries.

=== Stanner Award ===
ASP also publishes the Stanner Award winner for a scholarly manuscript (not fiction or poetry) by an Aboriginal or Torres Strait Islander, which recognises the importance of being published to emerging academics. The prize includes mentoring and editorial support by ASP, as well as publication of the manuscript, A$5,000, and a glass sculpture by Jenni Kemarre Martiniello. The biennial award is named in honour of the anthropologist W. E. H. (Bill) Stanner, who played an important role in establishing the AIAS, and the ongoing development of the institute.

In 1996, Auntie Rita, a biography of Rita Huggins co-written by her and her daughter Jackie Huggins, won the award.

Anna Haebich won the 1999 award for her work Broken circles: Fragmenting indigenous families 1800–2000.

In 2009, architect Paul Memmott won the prize for his work Gunyah, Goondie and Wurley: Aboriginal Architecture of Australia

The 2011 award was won by human rights advocate and lawyer Hannah McGlade in 2011.

=== AUSTLANG ===
The AIATSIS website hosts the AUSTLANG database, an informative source of information on all known Aboriginal Australian languages. With its beginnings on a card file compiled in the 1990s, the Indigenous Languages Database (ILDB) was developed based on the Language Thesaurus maintained by the AIATSIS library since the 1960s. The online version of AUSTLANG was developed in 2005, revised and released to the public in 2008, and after more redevelopment work, a refined version was released in 2018.

== Events ==
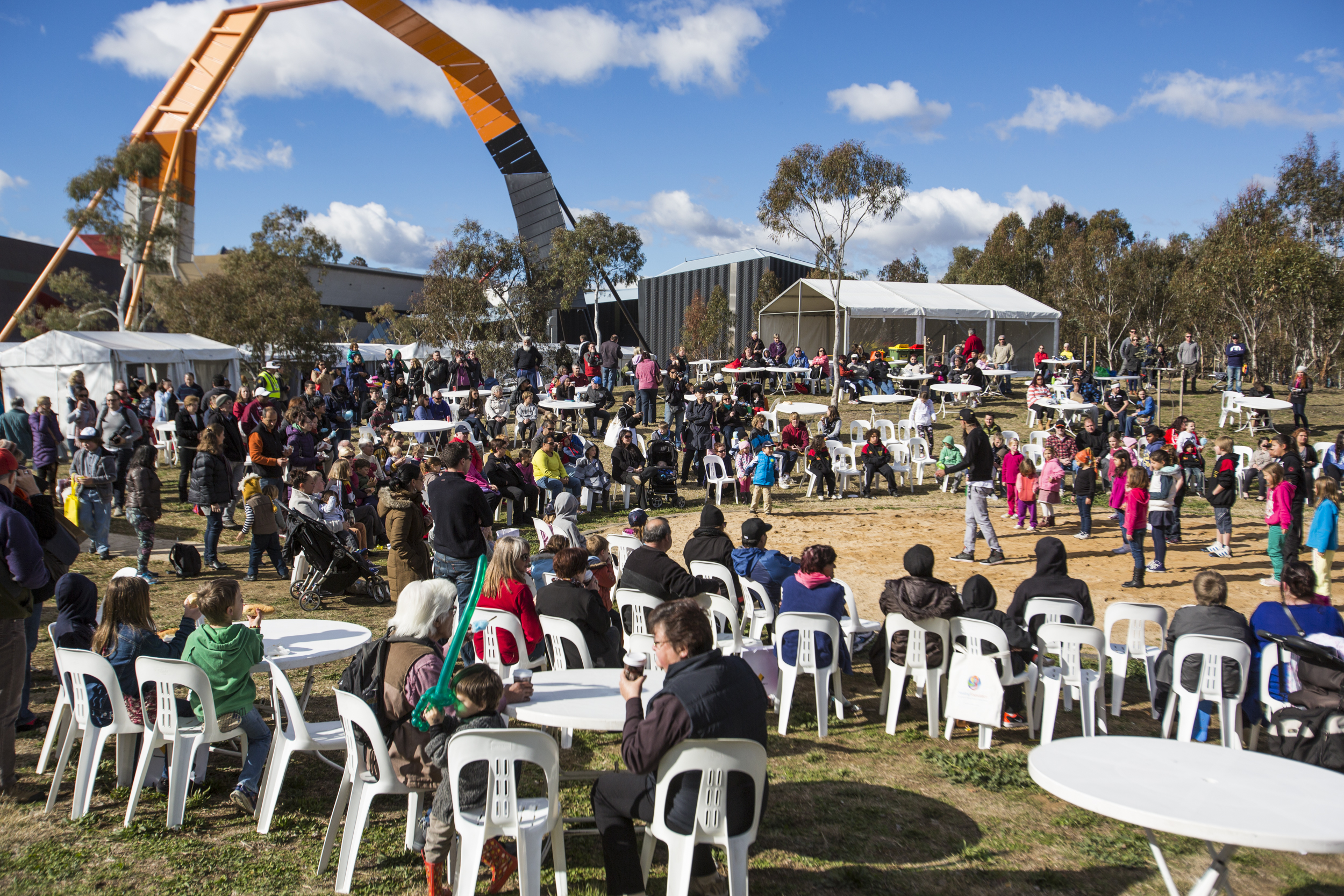
NAIDOC on the Peninsula, 2014

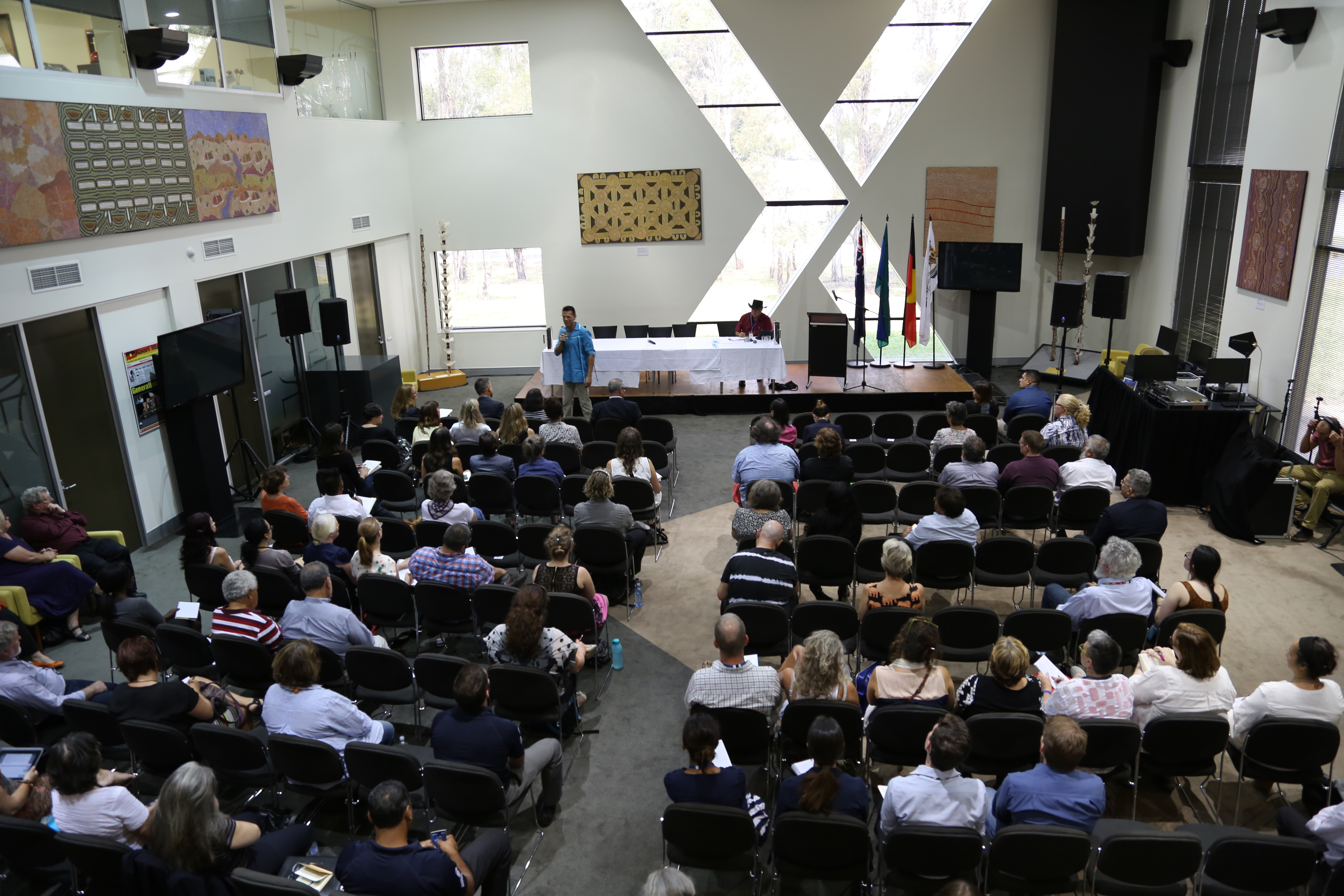
Taiaiake Alfred addresses the audience during a symposium on cultural strength, Stanner Room, AIATSIS, 11 February 2015.

AIATSIS hosts a range of special events and research workshops, symposiums and conferences. These have included:

=== Past events ===
- NAIDOC on the Peninsula was a Canberra-based event that held each year from 2006 until around 2014 on the Acton Peninsula, outside the AIATSIS building. It was a free, community event featuring local and national Indigenous musicians as well as activities for children and families. The aim of the event was to celebrate the cultural heritage of Aboriginal and Torres Strait Islander peoples, and it was held during NAIDOC Week.
- The National Native Title Conference (NNTC) was an annual or biennial conference that is co-convened by AIATSIS and a native title representative body or native title service provider. It was hosted in a different location and focused on a different theme each year.
- The National Indigenous Research Conference (ANIRC) was held every two years as a forum for sharing of multi-disciplinary expertise within the field of Indigenous studies. The program for the conference consisted of debates, panel discussions and presentation of papers.

=== Ongoing events ===
- In 2020, during the COVID-19 pandemic in Australia, the NNTC was cancelled, and in 2021 it merged with ANIRC, creating a five-day event known as the AIATSIS Summit. The inaugural 2021 AIATSIS Summit was held on Kaurna land in Adelaide, South Australia. As of 2024 the AIATSIS Summit, held in June, incorporates a three-day native title component as well as a two-day native title youth forum.
- The Wentworth Lecture, hosted by AIATSIS every two years, was established in 1978, in honour of W.C. Wentworth, who was involved in the establishment of the Institute in 1964. The lecture has been presented by a variety of prominent individuals "as a means to encourage all Australians to gain a better understanding of issues that go to the heart of our development as a nation". It was delivered by Marcia Langton in 2019 and by Greg Lehman in 2023.

== Location and building design ==
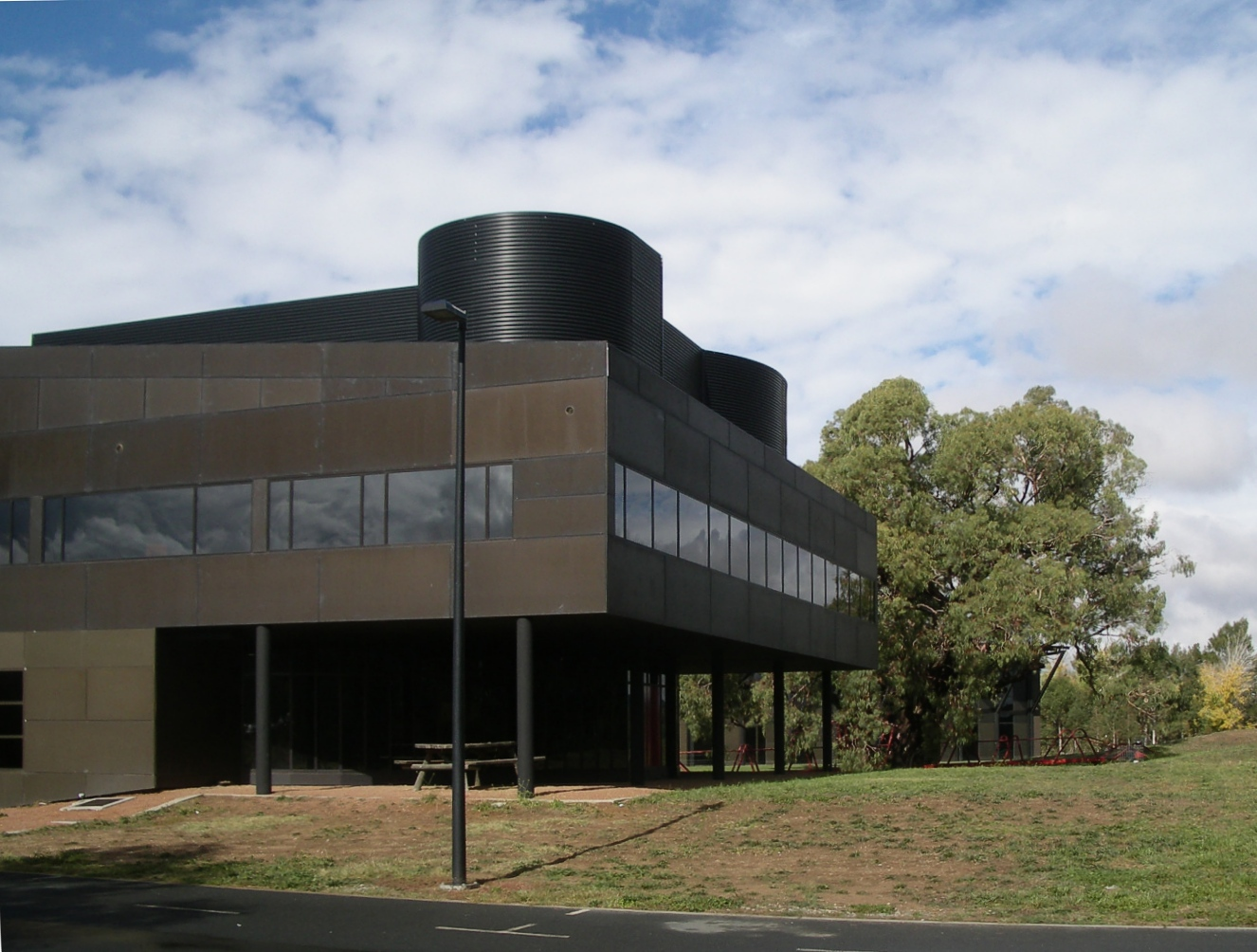
The west wing of the AIATSIS building designed by Ashton Raggatt McDougall, is a black replica of Le Corbusier's iconic Villa Savoye.

=== Canberra ===
AIATSIS is located on the Acton Peninsula in a building that was newly built for the Institute and opened in 2001. The building was officially opened by the Honourable W.C. Wentworth and Ken Colbung. As part of the opening the Ngunnawal people, the traditional owners of the land on which the AIATSIS building stands performed a Welcome to Country and smoking ceremony, and the Anbarra people from North Central Arnhem Land performed a friendship ceremony, known as the Rom ceremony.

The architect, Howard Ragatt of the firm Ashton Raggatt McDougall designed the building for AIATSIS and for its neighbour on the Acton Peninsula, the National Museum of Australia. During design of the AIATSIS building, it was reoriented from original plans to save two apple box trees that were identified as significant to the Peninsula. The building cost $13.75 million and was funded by the Commonwealth Government's Centenary of Federation Grants Program.

The design of the AIATSIS building has been the subject of differing interpretations. The rear of the building has been described as a black copy of pioneer architect Le Corbusier's 1920s Villa Savoye in France. The architect, Howard Raggatt, was quoted as confirming this influence but has also stated that it is designed to be reminiscent of Sidney Nolan's famous paintings of Ned Kelly.

A new building is planned in Canberra, to be located in a precinct to be named Ngurra, on the shores of Lake Burley Griffin, in the Parliamentary Triangle. The new precinct A$316.5 million will also include a new centre for learning and knowledge, and a resting place for ancestral remains of Aboriginal and Torres Strait Islander people from around the nation who are unable to be located in their Country. The name Ngurra occurs in several Aboriginal languages, meaning "home", "camp", "a place of belonging or inclusion". A design competition was held in 2022 to select the architects for the project.

=== AIATSIS Central Australia ===
A new AIATSIS facility known as AIATSIS Central Australia was opened on 2 February 2024 in Alice Springs/Mparntwe, to serve Aboriginal and Torres Strait Islander people in Central Australia. The offices and exhibition spaces were created from two vacant retail premises in Todd Mall.

== Collections ==
=== Overview ===
AIATSIS is considered to be Australia's premier resource for information about the cultures and societies of Aboriginal and Torres Strait Islander peoples.

AIATSIS is the only Commonwealth of Australia institution responsible for collecting and maintaining materials documenting the oral and visual traditions and histories of Australian Aboriginal and Torres Strait Islander people. The Institute identifies its collection as a "keeping place for culturally significant objects" that is "a resource for anybody looking to improve their knowledge of Aboriginal and Torres Strait Islander history and culture". The institute's holdings represent thousands of years of history and more than 500 Australian Indigenous languages, dialects and groups. This collection supports, and is a result of, research in the fields of Aboriginal and Torres Strait Islander Studies.

An independent assessment in 2014 confirmed that AIATSIS holds over 6 million feet of film, over 40,000 hours of audio, 12,800 unpublished manuscripts and record series, 653,000 photographs, and 120,000 print and published materials (3,000 of which are rare books) among other miscellanea. As of 2024 it was estimated that it holds over a million cultural items, which include 42,000 hours of audio, over 700,000 photographs, and around 6 million feet of film.

There are a number of items within the AIATSIS collection that have been both nationally and internationally recognised as significant:

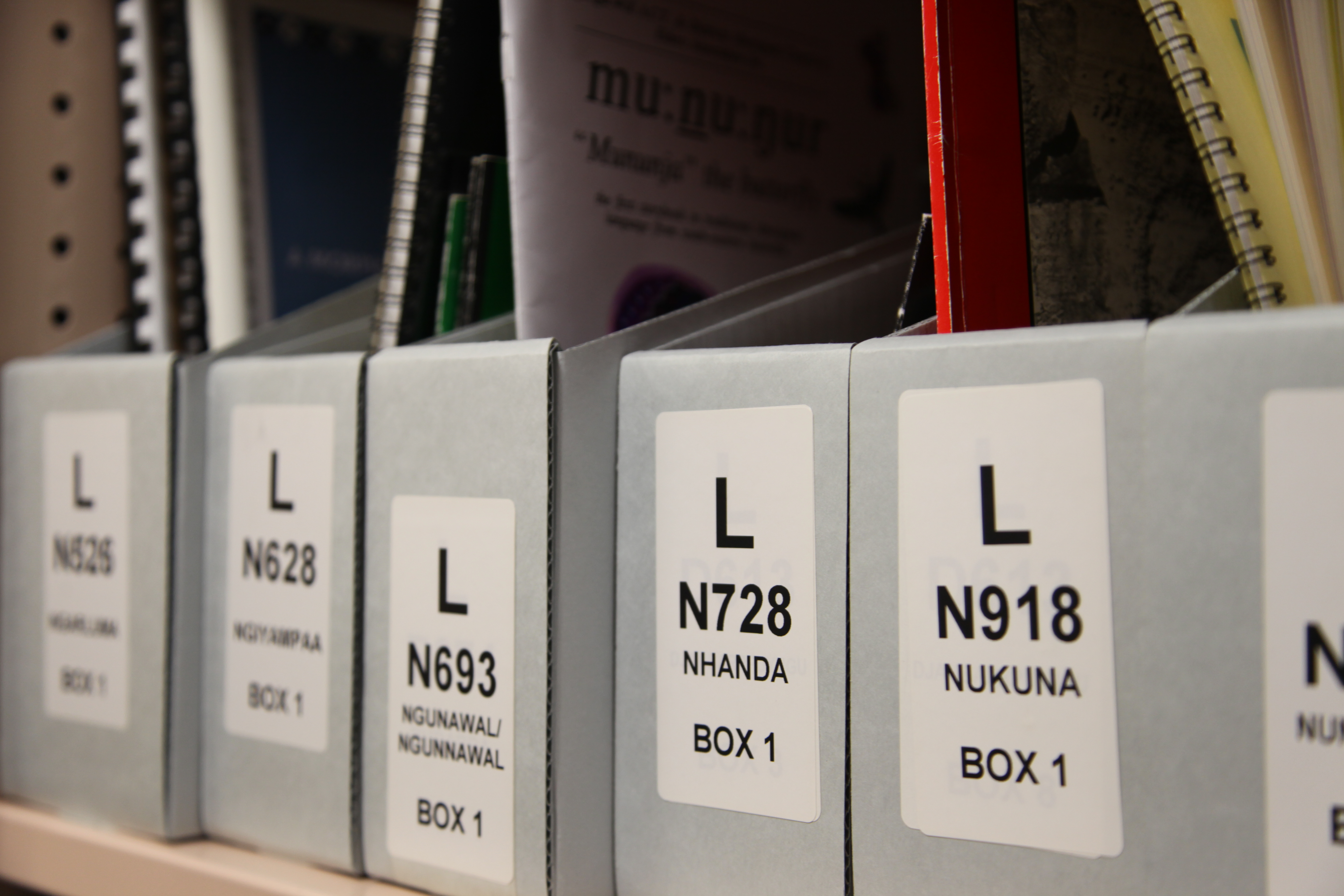
Part of the UNESCO listed Australian Indigenous Language collection held at AIATSIS

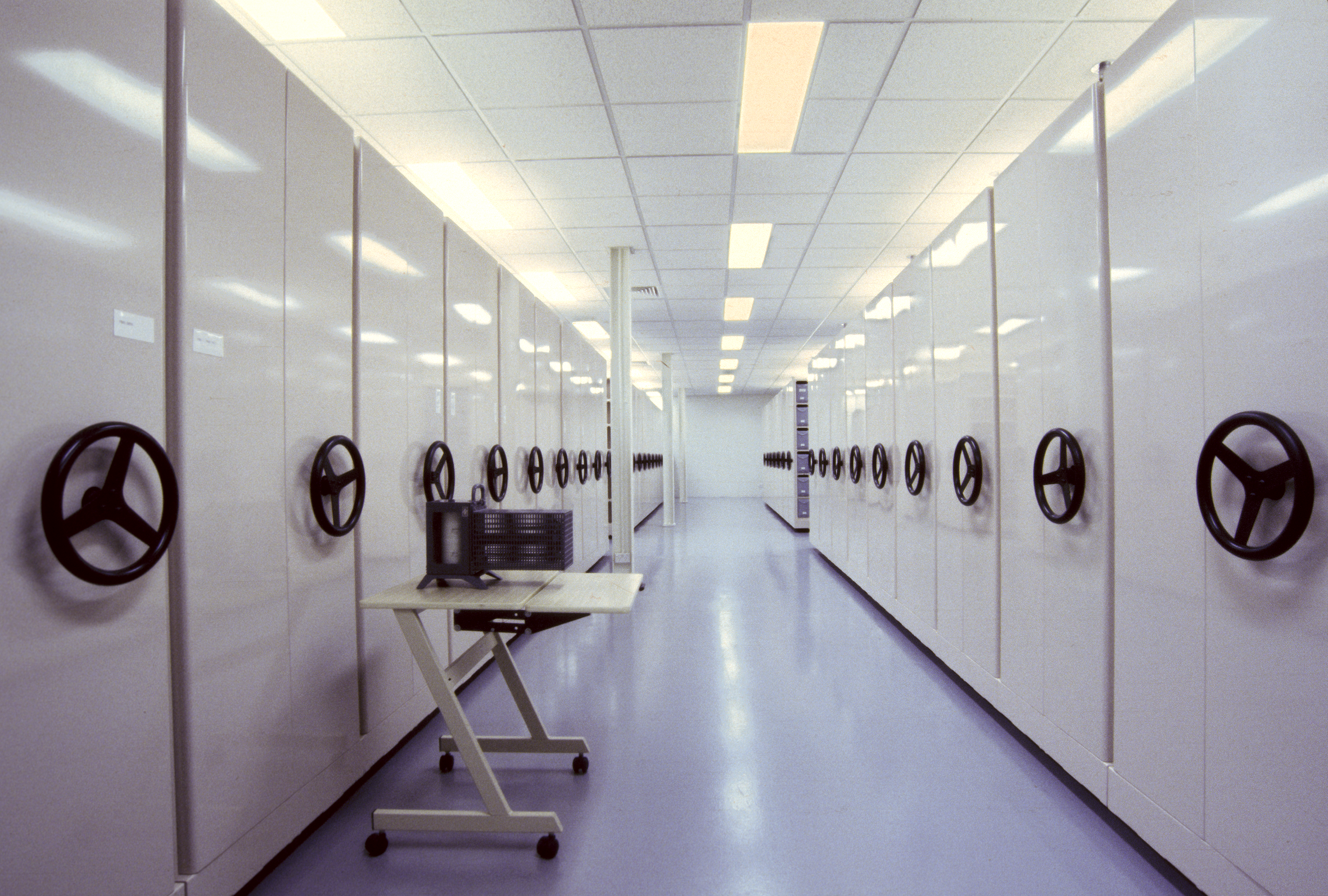
The vaults holding the Manuscript Collection at the Australian Institute of Aboriginal and Torres Strait Islander Studies in Canberra, ACT Australia

- The Australian Indigenous Language Collection – registered in the UNESCO Memory of the World Program. This is a collection of printed materials in Aboriginal and Torres Strait Islander languages that represents 200 of the estimated 250 languages spoken before European colonisation, including 40 endangered languages. It is recognised by UNESCO as the "only one of its kind housed in one location and catalogued as one collection".
- Sorry Books – registered in the UNESCO Memory of the World Program. AIATSIS holds 461 Sorry Books, representing hundreds of thousands of signatures and messages, from the 1998 campaign estimated to have generated around half a million signatures in total. The books are considered to have "powerful historical and social significance as the personal responses…to the unfolding history of the Stolen Generations".
- Luise Hercus (linguist) recordings of Aboriginal languages – added to the National Registry of Recorded Sound in 2012. This collection was made between 1963 and 1999 and includes over 1000 hours of recordings of 40 endangered Aboriginal languages, some of which are no longer spoken.

The Audiovisual Archives also holds copies of the first audio recorded in Australia; a series of ethnographic wax cylinder recordings made in the Torres Strait Islands in 1898. The Cambridge Anthropological Expedition to the Torres Strait, led by Alfred Cort Haddon, recorded songs and speech from Mer/Murray Island, Mabuiag/Jervis Island, Saibai Island, Tudu Island and Iama/Yam Island.

The AIATSIS collection is housed and managed through the Library and the Audiovisual Archive, and is broadly categorised into the following groups:

Art and artefact: a collection of items including ritual objects, folk art, children's art and modern or 'high art' and span from the late 19th century to the present day. This sub-collection comprises around 600 artworks and 500 artefacts, acquired either as a result of AIATSIS-sponsored field research or through donation or purchase.

Books and printed material: a collection of books, pamphlets, serials including magazines and government reports, reference publications such as dictionaries and other published material. This sub-collection holds over 175,680 titles, including 16,000 books and 3740 serials consisting of 34,000 individual issues and is used to support research, especially in Native Title cases and Link-Up services for members of the Stolen Generations.

Film: a collection of historical ethnographic films, documentaries and other published film and video titles, consisting of over 8 million feet of film and 4000 videos. Many of the films in the collection were produced by the AIAS Film Unit, which operated between 1961 and 1991.

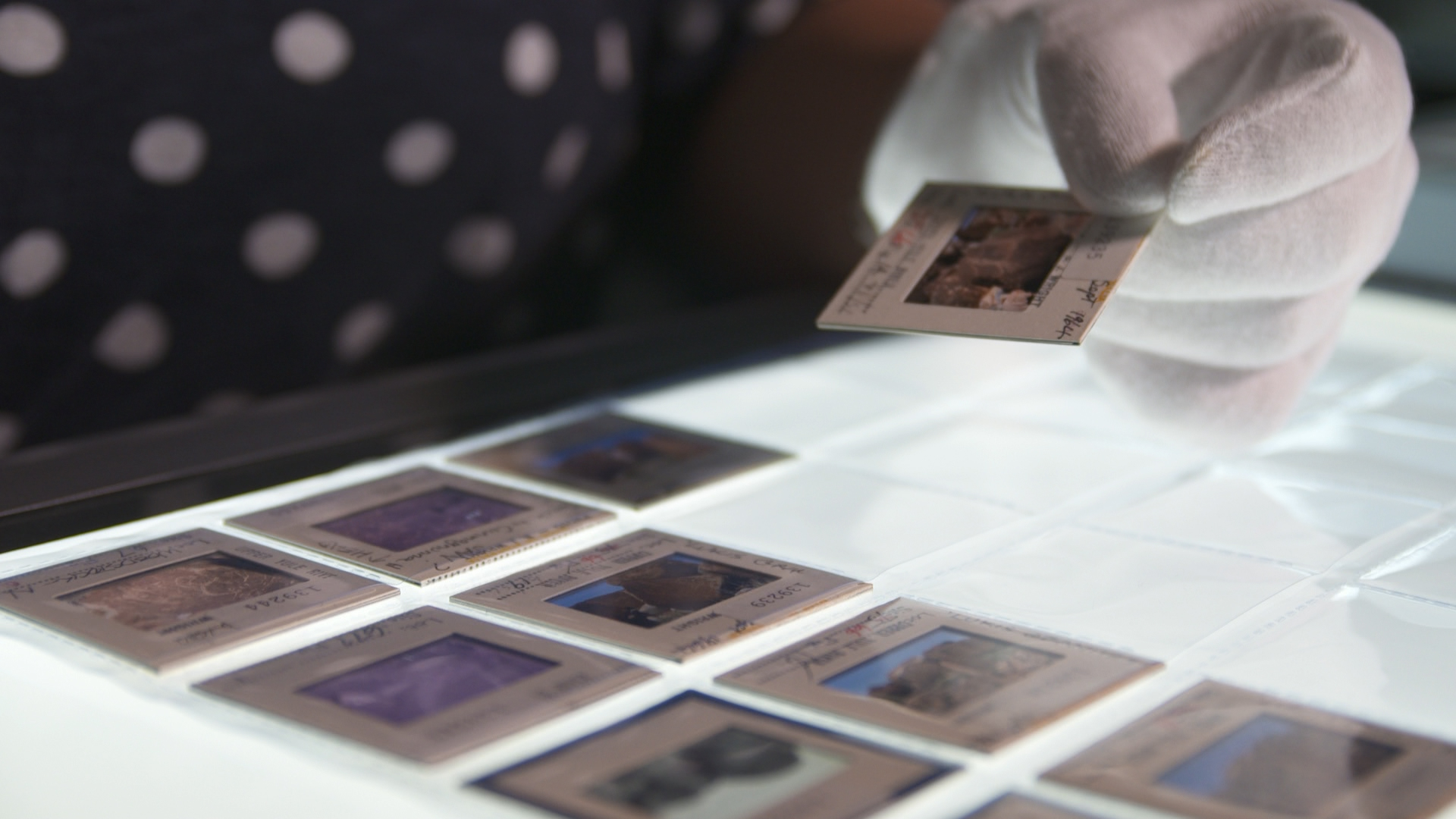
Colour slides from the Wright collection, containing images of Upper Yule River Rock Art

Manuscripts and rare books: a collection of more than 11,700 manuscripts, 2,600 rare books dating from 1766, 2,200 rare pamphlets and 1,700 rare serial titles consisting of 14,650 issues held in secure, environmentally controlled storage. Items are included in this classification on the basis of their age, rarity, value or sensitivity of the content for Aboriginal and Torres Strait Islander people. Among these items are the Sorry Books and the WEH Stanner papers.

Pictorial: this collection contains roughly 650,000 photographs that date from modern day as far back as the late 1800s, and more than 90% of images in the pictorial collection are unique to AIATSIS, making it the most comprehensive record of its kind relating to Australian Aboriginal and Torres Strait Islander people.

Sound: a collection of many unique and unpublished sound recordings totalling approximately 40,000 hours of audio. The recordings represent a breadth of cultural and historical information including languages, ceremonies, music, oral histories and interviews with participants in significant events such as the 1965 Freedom Rides and Prime Minister Kevin Rudd's Apology to the Stolen Generations.

=== Acquisitions ===
Since the establishment of the Institute in 1964, the AIATSIS collection has been developed through acquisition by donation, gift and purchase or, through materials created and collected during the work of ethnographic field researchers and filmmakers funded by the AIATSIS grants program. The collection has also been built through deposits of materials, an arrangement which permits the original owners to assign access and use conditions appropriate to the cultural information contained in the items.

AIATSIS' approach to collection building is based on three primary criteria:

1. Comprehensiveness – the aim is to have the collection be as comprehensive as possible. Given limited resources, the Audiovisual Archive focuses primarily on unpublished audio and visual materials and the Library generally on published materials. Other items are collected where possible.
2. Significance – items that meet this criterion are considered to make 'a lasting contribution to worldwide knowledge', reflect current AIATSIS research areas, valued by a particular Aboriginal or Torres Strait Islander community, are not well represented in other collections, have a link to AIATSIS' own history.
3. Representativeness – when resources are limited, AIATSIS will focus on collecting items that are 'representative of a particular class of creativity, research discipline or mode of cultural production.'

=== Collection management ===
Once material has been acquired by AIATSIS, the Institute faces the challenges of maintaining a cultural resource collection. This is achieved through a collection management plan that involves processes of recording and cataloguing, and appropriate storage and handling to extend the life of physical items and preserving their content through format shifting.

Preservation of physical items in the collection is achieved in two key ways:

1. Assessment and monitoring for contaminants, such as insects and mould, as well as any potential deterioration through environmental factors or physical damage.
2. Storage of collection items in climate-controlled vaults, to maintain their integrity and to minimise contact with deteriorating agents such as moisture and light. The Institute also follows international archiving guidelines for the storage and preservation of materials.

There are a wide variety of analogue photograph, tape and film formats held in the AIATSIS collection, which pose special preservation and future access risks. The age of some of these formats and materials, combined with the varying conditions in which they were stored prior to their acquisition by AIATSIS, heightens the deterioration of the media. Another preservation issue inherent in these analogue materials is the machines that can play back that particular format, as in some cases the material and the playback device are no longer manufactured. To manage these risks and maintain future access to the collection, preservation of the actual content contained in collection items is also achieved through a program of digitisation.

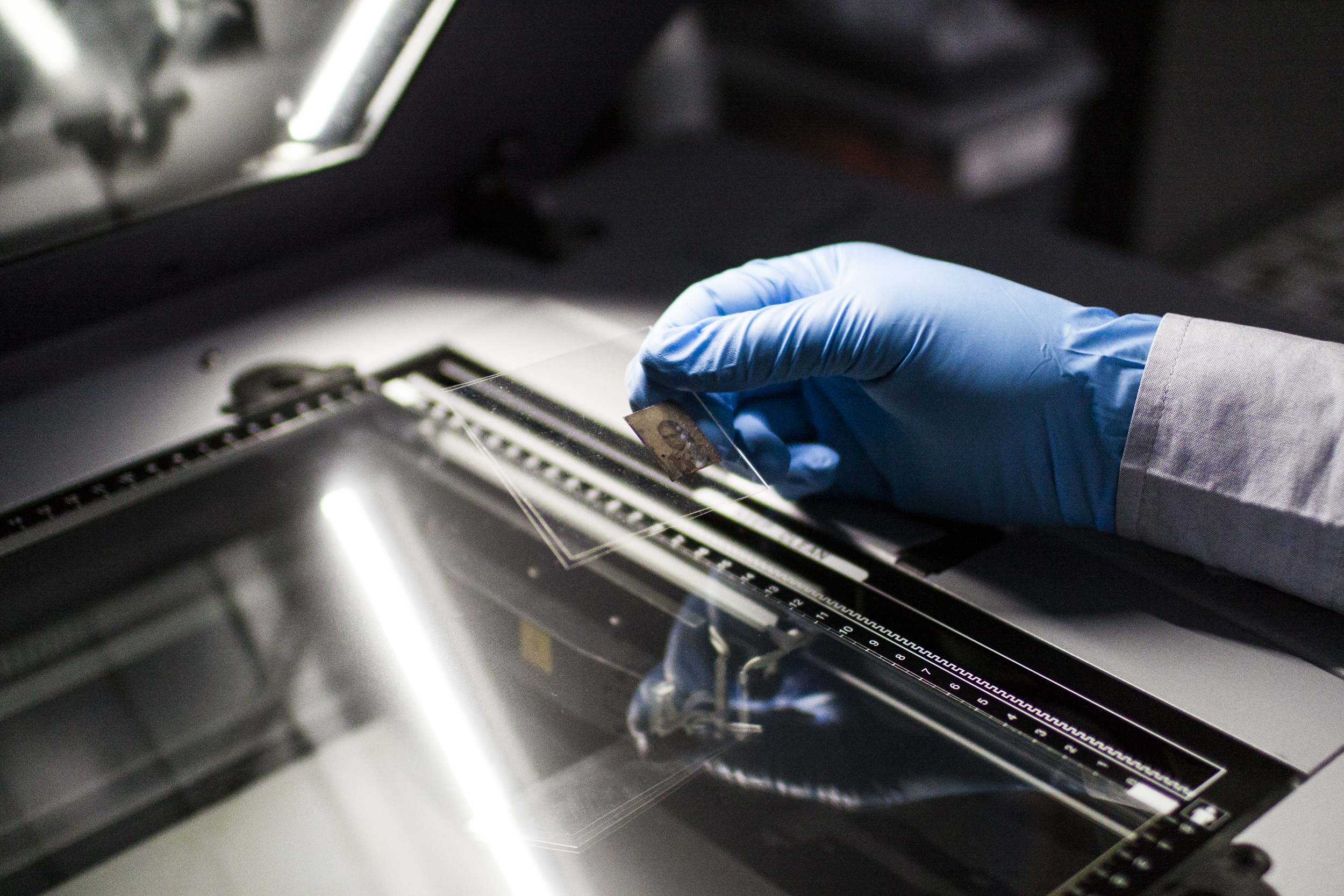
An AIATSIS pictorial technician prepares a tin type photograph for scanning.

Due to the potential issues of long-term archiving and storage of digital items, the opposite process is often employed to ensure access and preservation. In the case of digital publications and manuscripts, the originals will often be printed and incorporated into the print collections as an additional preservation measure.

The AIATSIS collection holds material that is sensitive and/or secret/sacred to Aboriginal and Torres Strait Islander peoples. In accordance with its founding Act, and as part of their collection management plan, AIATSIS adheres to strict protocols when handling and processing these sensitive items. The institute also supports and adheres to the protocols developed by the Aboriginal and Torres Strait Islander Library, Information and Resource Network (ATSILIRN). Restricted visual media such as photographs and printed items are stored separately to the rest of the collection and audio and moving image items are not played until any cultural requirements are checked. Restricted material must also be carefully handled during digitisation, which means that the work is carried out in secured conditions such as enclosed booths and by staff that can meet the protocols of the item being digitised.

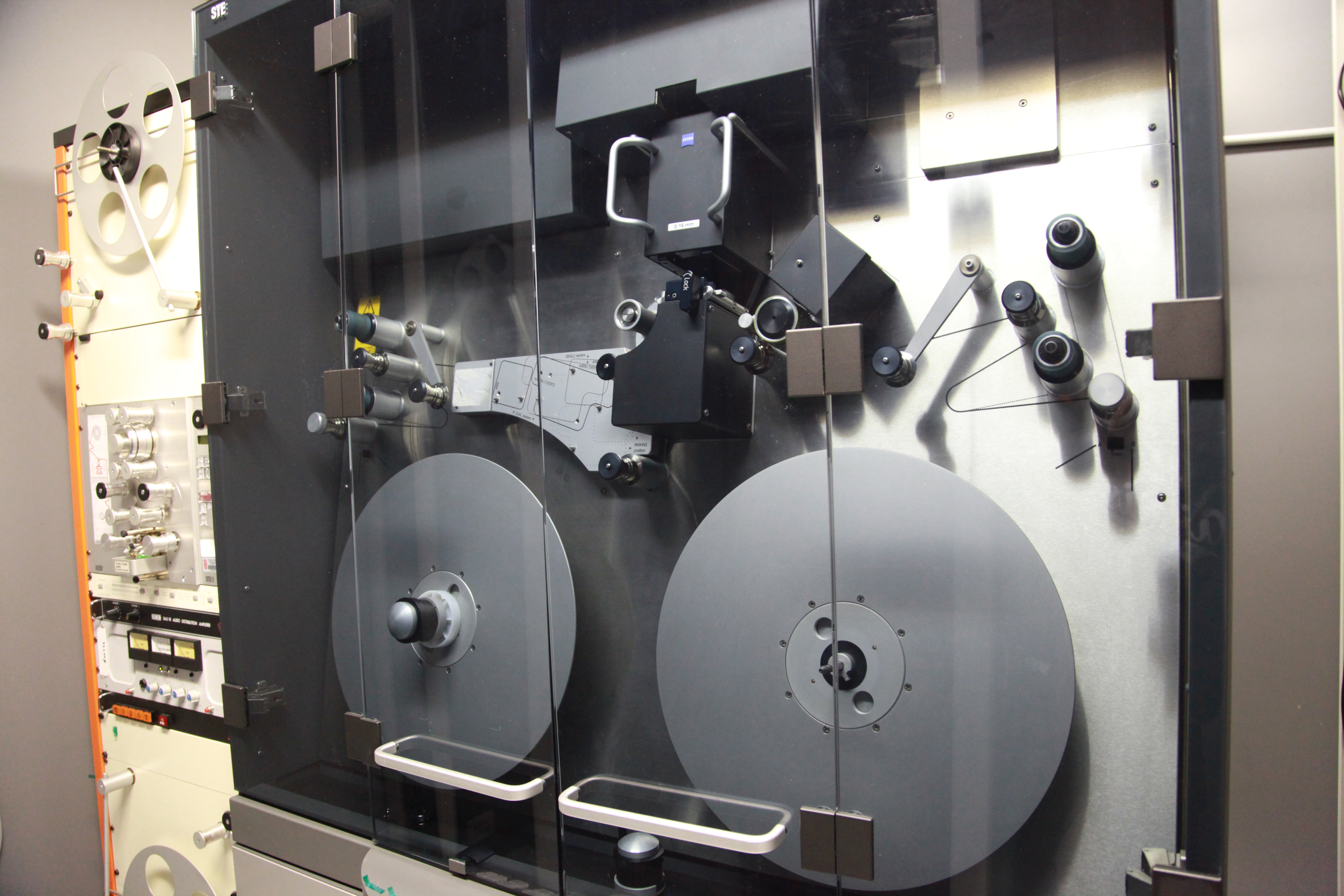
(R-L) The Shadow Telecine for motion picture film and the Sondor Magnetic film dubber, used by the AIATSIS Moving Image Unit to convert film stock to video tape or file

=== Digitisation program ===
AIATSIS launched its Library Digitisation Pilot Program in 2001, before which the Library had no dedicated digitisation equipment or policies for managing digital materials. This two-year program was originally funded by the Aboriginal and Torres Strait Islander Commission (ATSIC), and involved the creation of digital collections across the institution.

Since then AIATSIS has continued to incorporate digitisation of the collection into its management plan, but have publicly stated that an increase in funding is required for the institute to digitise some of the at risk formats held in the collection before those items are lost.

Given these limitations, AIATSIS prioritises the selection of materials for digitisation using factors including significance of the item/s, the level of deterioration, cultural protocols, copyright status, and client demand. One of the identified priorities of the program is to digitise and preserve all of the audiovisual collection currently on endangered magnetic tape formats by the 2025 deadline set by UNESCO.

=== Access to the collection ===
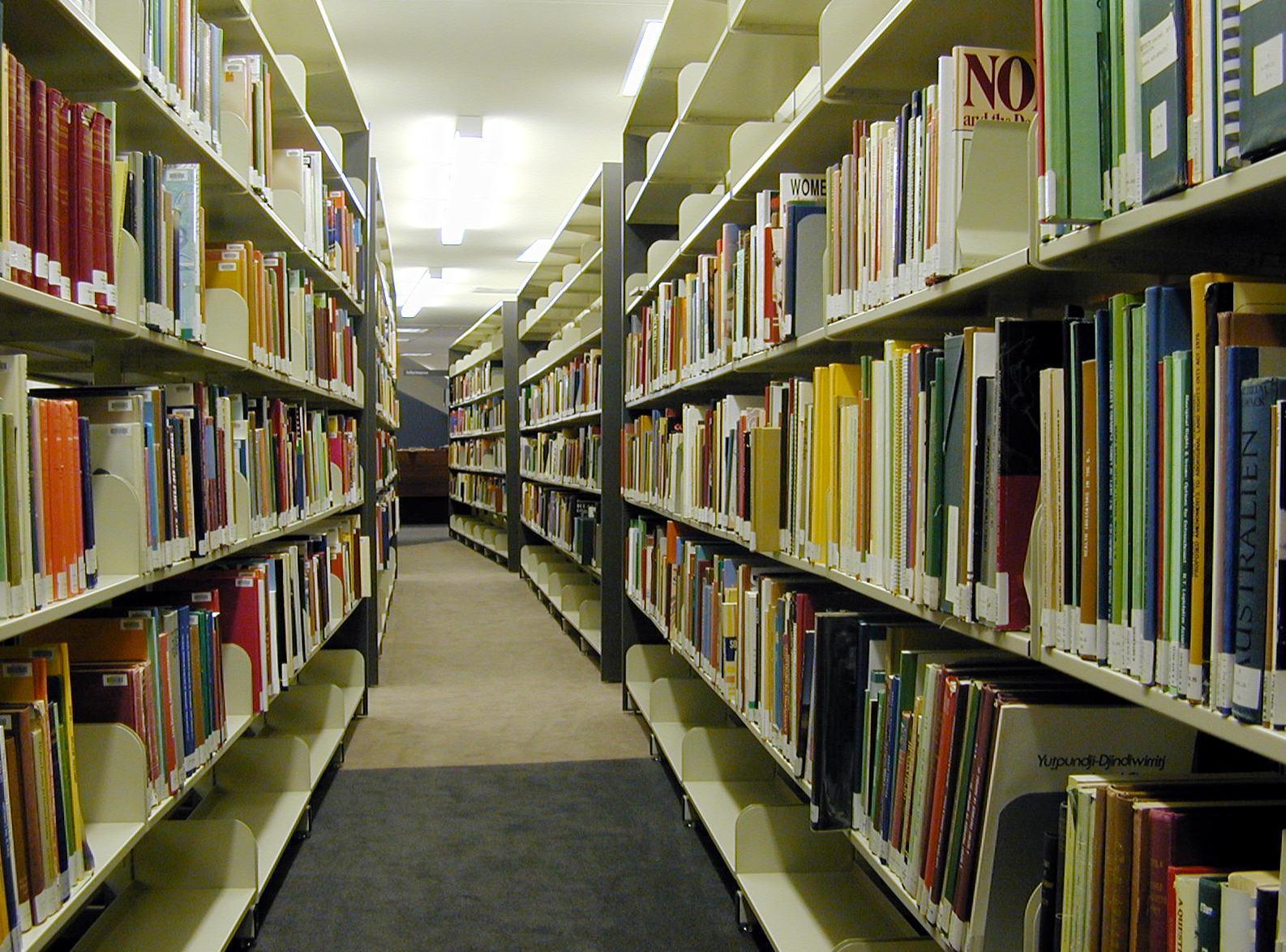
Library stacks showing some of the print collection available at AIATSIS

The collection is housed in the AIATSIS building on Acton Peninsula and is accessible through a number of resources. The AIATSIS Library is open to the public and holds a range of printed materials including manuscripts, journals, readers in different Aboriginal and Torres Strait Islander languages, dictionaries, published books and rare books, maps, and posters.

Access to AIATSIS' print and manuscript collections can be made through the Library's Stanner Reading Room and the film, sound and pictorial collections by appointment through the Access Unit. These physical access points are open limited hours.

The AIATSIS Digitisation Program contributes to increased access to the collection; whether access is through on site resources, the provision of copies of materials or the sharing of the collection online. Due to increasing obsolescence of analogue formats, AIATSIS identifies digitisation as the way to preserve those items for future generations to access. This is considered to be particularly important for facilitating "remote access by Aboriginal and Torres Strait Islander communities" as well as for access by researchers and the general public.

The AIATSIS Access Unit runs a program called Return of Material to Indigenous Communities (ROMTIC), through which Aboriginal and Torres Strait Islander clients are provided with up to twenty copies of collection materials that relate to their language group or family. This service is limited to items that have been preserved, so AIATSIS' digitisation program has allowed an increasing number of digital items available to ROMTIC clients.

AIATSIS also makes the collection available through a series of online exhibitions and digitised collection material published on their website. These showcase different themes or discrete collections of material, including:

- A.M. Fernando Notebooks (London, 1929–1930) – the notebooks of Anthony Martin Fernando, an Aboriginal man living and working in London, written between 1929 and 1930.
- Remembering Mission Days – a collection of material relating to the Aborigines' Inland Mission, including maps showing locations of missions and the magazines Our AIM and Australian Evangelical produced by the Aborigines' Inland Mission of Australia.
- 1967 Referendum – a presentation of images, newspaper clippings, audio material and information about the 1967 Referendum to change the Australian Constitution.
- Freedom Ride – a series of collection items including photographs and diary extracts relating to the 1965 Freedom Ride through country NSW, protesting race relations and living conditions of Aboriginal Australians.
- From Wentworth to Dodson – an interactive timeline that explores 50 years of AIATSIS history from 1964 to 2014.
- Dawn/New Dawn – a complete set of the magazine published by the New South Wales Aborigines Welfare Board.
- Koori Mail – the entire back catalogue of the Aboriginal owned and controlled newspaper, it is a collection spanning over 20 years and representing over 35,000 pages of digitised material.
- To Remove and Protect – a set of Australian legislation from all states and territories that has since been repealed but which allowed control over Aboriginal lives and livelihoods. These provide historical and legal context for the Stolen Generations and Stolen Wages.
- Sorry Books – a selection of messages and signatures from the Sorry Books collection, a series of books containing messages of apology from ordinary Australians, prominent individuals and international visitors to the Stolen Generations.
- Maningrida Mirage – a selection of issues of the Maningrida Mirage newsletter, produced by the Maningrida community between 1969 and 1974.

Access to the AIATSIS collection is also dictated by legislation governing the Institute and in some instances by legal agreements outlining the terms under which collection materials can be used.

The terms for access to the AIATSIS collection are in the first instance set by the AIATSIS Act, Section 41. This section states:

1. "Where information or other matter has been deposited with the Institute under conditions of restricted access, the Institute or the Council shall not disclose that information or other matter except in accordance with those conditions.

2. The Institute or the Council shall not disclose information or other matter held by it (including information or other matter covered by subsection (1)) if that disclosure would be inconsistent with the views or sensitivities of relevant Aboriginal persons or Torres Strait Islanders."

The conditions referred to in Section 41(1) of the AIATSIS Act are usually covered in the agreement that AIATSIS enters into when material is deposited. These agreements, along with the section 41(2) of the Act, can govern the way that unpublished material can be accessed and used.

Access to and use of material in the AIATSIS collection is also subject to the terms set out in the Copyright Act (1968).

When a donation or deposit is being made, AIATSIS requests to be made aware of any sensitive items included in the material. The secret or sacred nature of information contained in many collection items is an important factor in access to the AIATSIS collection. To protect items of high cultural sensitivity and reflect appropriate cultural values, access to items that contain culturally sensitive information are restricted to groups or individuals who have the permission of the relevant Aboriginal or Torres Strait Islander community and the depositor if restrictions have been applied by them.

AIATSIS also acknowledges the United Nations Declaration on the Rights of Indigenous Peoples and in particular Article 31's recognition of the right of Indigenous people to "maintain, control, protect and develop their cultural heritage, traditional knowledge and traditional cultural expressions."

In response to these complex issues AIATSIS developed an overarching Access and Use Policy in 2014, to "manage legal and cultural rights over material while maximising accessibility".

=== Collection resources ===
Since its inception, AIATSIS has developed and maintained a range of resources to enhance discoverability of the collection. One of the most significant of these resources is the Aboriginal and Torres Strait Islander Biographical Index (ABI). The ABI had its beginnings in 1979 as a non-selective biographical register of names, constructed using information on Aboriginal and Torres Strait Islander people from published material in the collection. In the early years of the biographical register, it was hoped it could "provide an important record of the achievements of Aboriginal people, and be a source of pride for generations to come".

Mura is AIATSIS' collection catalogue, which can be searched online. The word mura is a Ngunnawal word meaning "pathway". The index continues to be updated, to access the collection of more than a million items by 2024.

The former Perfect Pictures Database appears to have been superseded by the Photographic Collection, which contains around 400,000 (and growing) digitised images, and more than 700,000 images in total. For copyright and cultural reasons, the images may only be viewed in the Stanner Reading Room, but caption information is available online, and copies of the images may be requested.

AIATSIS also hosts or contributes to other online resources, aimed at facilitating access to and understanding of the collection. These include:

- Trove – the AIATSIS collection can be searched through the National Library of Australia online catalogue and database, Trove.
- Pathways Thesauri – these contains the terms used to describe items in the AIATSIS Collection, split into three entry points: languages, place names, and subject areas of study.
