= The Encyclopaedia of Aboriginal Australia =

1994 encyclopaedia published by the Aboriginal Studies Press

- Author: David Horton
- Subject: Aboriginal Australians
- Genre: Encyclopaedia
- Publisher: Aboriginal Studies Press
- Publication date: 1994
- Publication place: Australia
- Media type: Book and CD-ROM
- Awards: WA Premier's Book Award (1994); NSW Premier's Awards Book of the Year (1995); NSW Premier's Awards Special Award (1995)
- ISBN: 0-85575-234-3 (CD-ROMs 0-85575-261-0 and 0-85575-278-5)
- Dewey Decimal: 994.0049915

The Encyclopaedia of Aboriginal Australia: Aboriginal and Torres Strait Islander history, society and culture, edited by David Horton, is an encyclopaedia published by the Aboriginal Studies Press at the Australian Institute of Aboriginal and Torres Strait Islander Studies (AIATSIS) in 1994 and available in two volumes or on CD-ROM covering all aspects of Indigenous Australians lives and world (such as biography, history, art, language, sport, education, archaeology, literature, land ownership, social organisation, health, music, law, technology, media, economy, politics, food and religion). There are 2000 entries and 1000 photographs, with the CD-ROM having 250 sound items and 40 videos.

A map showing all of the Aboriginal groups, "based on language, history, self-identification, culture, [and] technology" as in the Encyclopaedia, was created by Horton in 1996 (and later updated).

== Description ==
The Encyclopaedia of Aboriginal Australia: Aboriginal and Torres Strait Islander history, society and culture was first published in two volumes, containing 1340 pages of entries and illustrations, in 1994.

According to Horton, The Encyclopaedia of Aboriginal Australia was "the first significant authoritative and comprehensive reference on all aspects of Australian Aboriginal and Torres Strait Islander history, society and culture". It covers all major subject categories, including history, art, economy, food, health, land ownership, language, law, literature, and music, as well as more recent political issues and biographies.

Over 200 contributors wrote articles for the Encyclopaedia, many of them Indigenous writers, activists or scholars. The editor chose to mention white people in the Encyclopaedia only where they had some impact on Aboriginal society. There are about 2000 entries and about 1000 photographs, maps and drawings. Two main themes are attributed to every article: Geographic Region and General subject. Prominent Aboriginal Australians Charles Perkins, David Mowaljarlai, and Galarrwuy Yunupingu all wrote endorsements to be printed on the cover of the book.

The work is aimed at a wide audience, both Indigenous and non-Indigenous, and it is written for general as well as academic readers. Most entries are followed by suggestions for further reading, with each work fully cited in the bibliography.

=== Maps ===
The map, published separately in 1996 (and with further editions in 1999, 2000, 2008 and 2013) delineates about 500 groups, divided into 18 geographic regions. Horton created the original map "by laying a large piece of transparent paper over the top of a large Tindale map" and then searching for further information from various published works, theses and work by linguists. The result of his researches led to the creation of the distinctive "fuzzy borders" of his map, which mostly corresponded with Tindale's boundaries. His original hand-drawn version is dated 1993. This version, which he called the "mud map" was used as a basis for the maps in the printed encyclopaedia. The Australian Surveying and Land Information Group (AUSLIG), a precursor to Geoscience Australia, produced the 1996 version.

== Reviews ==
A 1996 review by an Indigenous reviewer called it a "Dreaming Send", praising the work for representing the Indigenous perspective and for recognising both the diversity as well as the unity among Indigenous Australians. She writes also that it allows white Australians to find information they may not otherwise find, while using a "very concise and easy to absorb style".

Archaeologist Sharon Wellfare said that the "much admired" work was an "invaluable resource", which she had used extensively in teaching Aboriginal Studies in New South Wales public schools. She did have some criticisms, notably that the context in which each entry was written relied on self-identification by the author, which was not always evident, as biographies of authors are not supplied.

The CD-ROM was made available after the launch of the book version in 1994. It was criticised for user-unfriendliness due to the lack of hypertext links. Important details, such as the passing of the Native Title Act 1993, were missing from the CD-ROM as of 1995.

== Awards ==
The Encyclopaedia of Aboriginal Australia won the following awards:

- The Australian Award for Excellence in Educational Publishing
- WA Premier's Literary Award
- AIMIA Award (AMY Award) for Best Multimedia Title 1994
- CACS (Centre for Australian Cultural Studies) Award for "An Outstanding Contribution to Australian Culture 1994"
- NSW Premier's Literary Award 1995 "Book of the Year"
- NSW Premier's Literary Award 1995 "Special Award"
- Print Industry Gold Medal for excellence in printing

== Citations and significance ==
As of May 2020, Google Scholar lists 419 citations of the work, while ResearchGate lists 43.
