= David Horton (writer) =

Australian writer

David Robert Horton (born 1945) is an Australian writer with qualifications and careers in science and the arts. He is known for his compilation of the work The Encyclopaedia of Aboriginal Australia: Aboriginal and Torres Strait Islander history, society and culture in 1994, and its accompanying map of Aboriginal groupings across Australia.

== Early life, education and research ==
Horton was born in Perth, Western Australia, in 1945. He attended John Curtin High School

In 1966 he was awarded Bachelor of Science, majoring in zoology, with Honours at the University of Western Australia, and in 1968 Master of Science (zoology) at the University of New England . He then undertook a Bachelor of Arts at University of New England in Armidale, New South Wales, graduating in 1973.

He earned two doctorates, both at the University of New England: Doctor of Philosophy (PhD) in 1976 and Doctor of Letters (DLitt) in 1997.

He was teaching fellow at New England University from 1967 to 1973, alongside his studies there. After this, as a postdoctoral fellow, he conducted research in biogeography, graduating in 1974 at the University of York in northern England. Horton's research between 1974 and 1984 included scincid lizards and biogeography, archaeozoology (sites from the Cape York Peninsula to south-west Tasmania), Pleistocene extinctions, the role of fire in Australian ecosystems, and the Aboriginal occupation of Australia during the Pleistocene.

== Career ==
Horton has had careers in biology, archaeology and publishing and farming, as well as writing and editing many articles and books.

He joined the then Australian Institute of Aboriginal Studies (AIAS) (former name of the Australian Institute of Aboriginal and Torres Strait Islander Studies) as the institute's osteologist in 1974, the following year taking on the role of paleoecologist. He was acting deputy principal at AIATSIS in 1984, and subsequently appointed manager of the Publications section, until he became Director of Publications in 1988–89 at Aboriginal Studies Press, the publishing arm of AIATSIS, a role he occupied until 1998.

It was while he was director of publishing that he compiled, edited and published the work for which he became known, The Encyclopaedia of Aboriginal Australia, which won two New South Wales Premier's Literary Awards as well as other awards.

During his career, he published about 100 scientific papers as well several books on biology and archaeology.

=== Boards and other ===
He was a member of the International Council for Archaeozoology (IZAC) and of an advisory panel for the New South Wales Premier's History Awards in 1997.

== Writing after retirement ==
After retirement, he devotes his time to being a professional writer and farmer. Between 2008 and 2011, he wrote many opinion pieces for the ABC News website. He also published prolifically on a wide range of topics for the HuffPost until 2011.

Since 2023 he has published two memoirs: Beginning's end: Origins of an English migrant family to Australia in 1929. 176 pages Australian Scholarly Publishing, Arcadia, North Melbourne ISBN 978-1-923267-42-8 An account of his family history up to his birth and early childhood.

Hammering on the mind's door paperback 268 pages Published 2023 by Ginninderra Press ISBN 9781761096297 An account of his school and university years and subsequent career.

And he has published in 2026 a book of poetry: The quiet still centre Australian Scholarly Publishing, Arcadia, North Melbourne ISBN 978-1-923267-60-2

== Recognition ==
The Encyclopaedia of Aboriginal Australia won many awards, including the NSW Premier's Literary Award 1995 "Book of the Year" and NSW Premier's Literary Award 1995 "Special Award".

== Selected works ==
- Recovering the Tracks: The Story of Australian Archaeology. Aboriginal Studies Press. 1991. ISBN 978-0-85575-221-7.
- The Encyclopaedia of Aboriginal Australia: Aboriginal and Torres Strait Islander history, society and culture
- Horton, David R. (1996). The AIATSIS Map of Indigenous Australia. Australian Institute of Aboriginal and Torres Strait Islander Studies. Wikidata Q134423353.
- The pure state of nature : sacred cows, destructive myths and the environment. Allen & Unwin. 2000. ISBN 978-1-74115-408-5.

Beginning's end: Origins of an English migrant family to Australia in 1929. 176 pages Australian Scholarly Publishing, Arcadia, North Melbourne ISBN 978-1-923267-42-8 Hammering on the mind's door paperback 268 pages Published 2023 by Ginninderra Press ISBN 9781761096297 The quiet still centre Australian Scholarly Publishing, Arcadia, North Melbourne ISBN 978-1-923267-60-2

- The watermelon blog: writer, scientist, conservationist, progressive, atheist. 2000–2020. Archived from the original on 1 July 2013 – via Pandora archive.
