= Dreaming (Australian Aboriginal art) =

Term in Australian Aboriginal artwork

In Australian Aboriginal art, a Dreaming is a totemistic design or artwork, which can be owned by a tribal group or individual. This usage of anthropologist W. E. H. Stanner's term was popularised by Geoffrey Bardon in the context of the Papunya Tula artist collective he established in the 1970s.

== Terminology ==
"The Dreaming" or "Dreamtime" is commonly used as a term for the animist creation narrative of Aboriginal Australians for a personal, or group, creation and for what may be understood as the "timeless time" of formative creation and perpetual creating. In addition, the term applies to places and localities on indigenous Australian traditional land (and throughout non-traditional Australia) where the uncreated creation spirits and totemic ancestors, or genii loci, reside.

The term was coined by W. E. H. Stanner in 1956, and popularized from the 1960s. based on the description of indigenous Australian mythology by Lucien Levy-Bruhl (La Mythologie Primitive, 1935).

The term "Dreaming" is based on the root of the term altjira (alcheringa) used by the Aranda people, although it has since been pointed out that the rendition is based on a mistranslation. Stanner introduced the derived term of "dreamtime" in the 1970s.

== Contemporary Indigenous Australian art ==
"A Dreaming" is a story owned by different tribes and their members that explains the creation of life, people and animals. A Dreaming story is passed on protectively as it is owned and is a form of intellectual property. In the modern context, an Aboriginal person cannot relate or paint someone else's dreaming or creation story without prior permission of the Dreaming's owner. Someone's dreaming story must be respected, as the individual holds the knowledge to that Dreaming story. Certain behavioural constraints are associated with dreaming ownership; for instance, if a Dreaming is painted without authorisation, such action can meet with accusations of "stealing" someone else's Dreaming. Geoffrey Bardon's three books on Papunya (1971, 1976, 1978) specifically mention conflict related to possession of a dreaming story. He uses as an example the Honey Ant Dreaming painted in contemporary times on the school walls of Papunya. Before the mural could be painted, all tribes in Papunya: the Pintupi, Warlpiri, Arrernte, and Anmatyerre, had to agree that the honey ant was an acceptable mural, since Papunya is the meeting place for all tribes. After the mural was painted, one of the senior elders, Long Tom Onion, reminded Bardon that he, the elder, had suggested the mural be painted. Later, Bardon realised Long Tom Onion owned that Dreaming. He comprehended the importance of Dreaming ownership among Aboriginal Australians, especially those who retain tribal and traditional connections.

Among the Central Desert tribes of Australia, the passing on of the Dreaming story is for the most part gender-related. For example, the late artist from the Papunya movement, Clifford Possum Tjapaltjarri, painted ceremonial dreamings relating to circumcision and love stories, and lessons for "naughty boys". His daughters Gabriella Possum and Michelle Possum have tended to paint the "Seven Sisters" Dreaming or the Pleiades, as they inherited that Dreaming through the maternal line. Consequently, they have painted their "Grandmother's Country", which is an expression of their inherited ownership of the land through knowledge of the dreamings. Clifford and his daughters have not painted the same subjects; Clifford has never painted the "Seven Sisters Dreaming". By tribal law, his daughters are not allowed to see male tribal ceremonies, let alone paint them.

Dreamings as "property" have also been used by a few Aboriginal tribes to argue before the High Court of Australia their title over traditional tribal land. Paintings of Dreamings, travelling journeys, and ceremonies tend to depict the locations where they occur.

== See also ==
- Anangu
- Embodied imagination
