= Bora (Australian) =

Initiation ceremony of the Aboriginal and Torres Strait Islander people of Australia

Bora is an initiation ceremony of the Aboriginal people of Eastern Australia. The word "bora" also refers to the site on which the initiation is performed. At such a site, boys, having reached puberty, achieve the status of men. The initiation ceremony differs from Aboriginal culture to culture, but often, at a physical level, involved scarification, circumcision, subincision and, in some regions, also the removal of a tooth. During the rites, the youths who were to be initiated were taught traditional sacred songs, the secrets of the tribe's religious visions, dances, and traditional lore. Many different clans would assemble to participate in an initiation ceremony. Women and children were not permitted to be present at the sacred bora ground where these rituals were undertaken.

== Bora terminology ==
The word Bora was originally taken from the Gamilaraay language spoken by the Kamilaroi people who lived in the region north of the Hunter Valley in New South Wales to southern Queensland. It was then adopted broadly to describe similar ritual sites and the ceremonies associated with them performed throughout Eastern Australia. Many other terms exist across Australia to denote similar initiatory rites on a ceremonial ground, such as burbung (Wiradjuri), and kuringal (Yuin). The specific word is said to come from the belt worn by initiated men.

== Bora grounds and mythology ==
The appearance of the site varies among cultures, but it is often associated with stone arrangements, rock engravings, or other art works. In the bora rites of southeastern Australia, two circles were drawn, connected by a pathway, a schema which appears to replicate a sky Bora, or the configuration of a series of positions in the Milky Way. Typically, bora ground comprised a larger circle with a diameter of between 20–30 metres, and a smaller ring around 10–15 metres in diameter. The former was a more public space while the latter was sacred, and restricted to male participants who were either the instructing male elders or the initiants.

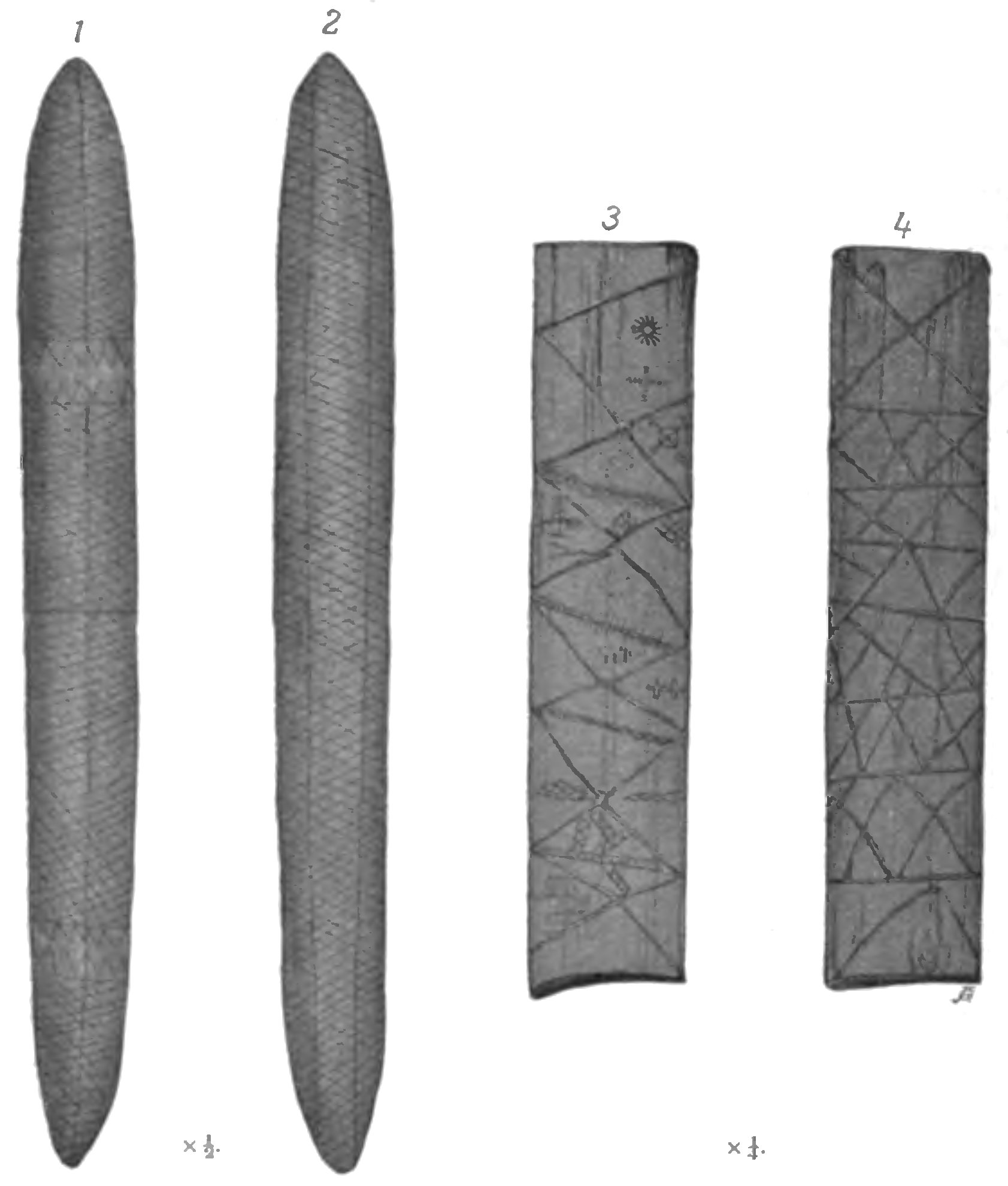
Message stick which was sent when all the tribe was to be collected for great meetings, ceremonial fights, or the Bora ceremonies.

In south-east Australia, the Bora is often associated with the creator-spirit Baiame. In the Sydney region, large earth mounds were made, shaped as long bands or simple circles. Sometimes the boys would have to pass along a path marked on the ground representing the transition from childhood to manhood, and this path might be marked by a stone arrangement or by spirit footprints (mundowa), cut into the rock. In other areas of south-east Australia, a Bora site might consist of two circles of stones, and the boys would start the ceremony in the larger, public, one, and end it in the other, smaller, one, to which only initiated men are admitted. Robert Hamilton Mathews (1897) gives an excellent eye-witness account of a Bora ceremony, and explains the common use of the two circles. One very fine example of a two ring bora ceremonial site used to exist in Alberton, Queensland till it was destroyed, and made way for a pineapple plantation in the late 1950s. The smaller southern ring contained a dolmen-like structure.

The rings are joined by a sacred walkway. While most are confined to south-east Queensland and eastern New South Wales, five earth rings have been recorded near the Victorian town of Sunbury, although Aboriginal use has not been documented.

Bora rings in the form of circles of individually placed stones are evident in Werrikimbe National Park in northern New South Wales.

== Sources ==
- Berndt, Ronald Murray (1974). Australian Aboriginal Religion, Parts 1-4. BRILL Publishers. ISBN 978-9-004-03861-5.
- Eidelson, Meyer (1997). The Melbourne Dreaming: A Guide to the Aboriginal Places of Melbourne. Aboriginal Studies Press. ISBN 978-0-855-75306-1.
- Footprints on Rock. Sydney: Metropolitan Local Aboriginal Land Council. 1997. ISBN 978-0-7313-1002-9.
- Frankel, David (1982). "Earth rings at Sunbury, Victoria". Archaeology in Oceania. 17 (2): 89–97. doi:10.1002/j.1834-4453.1982.tb00043.x.
- Fuller, Robert S.; Hamacher, Duane W.; Norris, Ray P. (2013). "Astronomical Orientations of Bora Ceremonial Grounds in Southeast Australia". Australian Archaeology. 77 (77): 30–37. arXiv:1305.0881. doi:10.1080/03122417.2013.11681977. S2CID 119268136.
- Mathews, Robert Hamilton (1897). "The Burbung of the Darkinung Tribes" (PDF). Proceedings of the Royal Society of Victoria. 10 (1): 1–12.
- Ponosov, Vladimir Vasil'evich (1974). Results of an archaeological survey of the Southern region of Moreton Bay and of Moreton Island (1963-1964) (PDF). University of Queensland.
- Prineas, Peter; Gold, Henry (1997). Wild Places: Wilderness in Eastern New South Wales. Katsehamos & the Great Idea. ISBN 978-0-858-81158-4.
- Rolls, Mitchell; Johnson, Murray (2010). Historical Dictionary of Australian Aborigines. Scarecrow Press. ISBN 978-0-810-87475-6.
