= Camille Goldstone-Henry =

Australian scientist

- Education: University of New South Wales
- Occupation: CEO
- Employer: Xylo
- Known for: AI and Biodiversity

Camille Goldstone-Henry is the founder and CEO of Xylo systems, which use Artificial Intelligence to measure biodiversity, and winner of Women of AI Australia and New Zealand, for Climate Change, as well as Trailblazer of 2022. She is also a wildlife scientist and Kamilaroi woman, who has worked with orange-bellied parrots and Tasmanian tigers.

== Early life ==
Growing up in Newcastle, NSW, Goldstone-Henry grew up in the coastal area of Newcastle, in NSW. She spent much of her childhood immersed in nature, including spending time either on the beach, bush walking, camping, or surfing.

While she was growing up, her parents, Donna Hartz and Gary Henry, were involved in an eco-innovative and sustainable lifestyle, which included using solar panels as well as growing their own organic produce, and solar panels in the 1990s indicated use of a sustainable life before many others had embraced renewable energy. Her parents and their way of life meant that caring for the environment was imbued in her life at an early age, creating a perception that caring for the environment was the normal way of life.

== Career and education ==
Goldstone-Henry obtained a Bachelor of Animal and Veterinary Bioscience at the University of Sydney, in 2014, and a Masters of Business Administration from the University of New South Wales, 2022.

She worked at the Zoo and Aquarium Association of Australasia, from 2014 to 2017. She was responsible for managing the Tasmanian Tiger 'insurance' population, which was managed due to a facial tumour in wild populations of Tasmanian tigers.

Goldstone-Henry then worked at the University of Sydney until Feb 2022, until joining Startmate's Winter 2022 Accelerator cohort as CEO and co-founder of Xylo Systems, which provides biodiversity intelligence for businesses.

In her interviews, she stated that her vision is to "create a worldwide solution for conserving biodiversity and Australia's iconic species."

"I dream of a future where my grandchildren can see koalas in the wild," she says. "I'm passionate about bringing conservation and technology together to create a sustainable future for humans and animals."

Her company, Xylo, of which she is founder and CEO, has won numerous awards for biodiversity, climate change and conservation, as well for start-ups and within the Technology sector.

== Media ==
Goldstone-Henry has described her work in AI and biodiversity conservation in many media articles, including articles and podcasts, on indigenous perspectives on science and climate change, including Let's talk Robotics, as well as presenting at conferences. She spoke on gender in science, and how AI can be used to improve monitoring of biodiversity, on International Women's Day, 2023.

== Artificial Intelligence ==
Goldstone-Henry's company, Xylo Systems is a cloud-based platform, which uses artificial intelligence (AI) to manage, connect, and monitor conservation projects and biodiversity. The goal is to manage biodiversity and conservation areas, using AI, to allow improved data collection, to "tackle the extinction crisis faster, together".

"Our core product aggregates environmental and conservation data onto a platform, and we present that conservation data in visualisations. Our AI algorithms also mine the data that's being fed into our system from open source data sets, our clients' internal data sets and also from data we're generating ourselves to find wildlife stories hidden in numbers, to find out what has happened in the past and what can we do in the future? This is to ensure we can preserve those critically endangered species we have not just here in Australia but around the world. Then, we can provide decision makers and the corporate sector with strategies and recommendations on how they can preserve biodiversity or absolutely minimise their impact on biodiversity."

Goldstone-Henry has also commented on the need for female-founded start-up technology companies to receive comparable venture capital funding, as companies led by white males.

== Recognition & awards ==
Goldstone-Henry's awards, for her work in Xylo and biodiversity conservation, include:

- 2020 – Wild Idea Incubator finalist
- 2021 – Hatch Taronga Accelerator finalist
- 2021 – Sir Rupert Myers Sustainability Award
- 2021 – Australian Women's Weekly Women of the Future Winner
- 2022 – Tech for Good Hub Scholarship
- 2022 – NSW Young Woman of the Year finalist
- 2022 – Women in AI – Trailblazer award, conferred by Women in AI, Australia & New Zealand
- 2022 – Women in AI – Climate Award, conferred by Women in AI, Australia & New Zealand
- 2022 – Vogue Australia Future Innovator Runner Up
- 2023 – KPMG Australia Nature Positive Challenge Winner
- 2025–26 – Superstar of STEM, conferred by Science & Technology Australia
