= Ganhanbili =

In Australian Aboriginal mythology (specifically: Kamilaroi), Ganhanbili or Kunnanbeili is one of the two wives of Bayaami, the other being Birrangulu.
