= Creative Spirits =

Creative Spirits is an online resource focused on Australian Indigenous culture that has been criticised for containing misinformation.

== History ==
Creative Spirits was launched in 1999 by Jens Korff, initially as a means to share information about his travels around Australia. In 2006 he began adding information about Aboriginal and Torres Strait Islander people and their communities. Notably, Korff is not Indigenous himself and has been criticised by Indigenous people for what is on the website. He wrote in 2020 that the website will transition to becoming "Aboriginal-owned and led".

== Criticisms ==
The use of Creative Spirits as a reliable source has been repeatedly criticised. The website has been noted as perpetuating negative stereotypes and has been further criticised for not consulting Indigenous people or community. It is considered a prominent example of websites that contain misinformation about Indigenous people. Additionally, it was found that its use on Wikipedia led to some distrust of Wikipedia as a whole among Indigenous people.

In 2023, Corrinne Sullivan and Jessica McLean wrote that Creative Spirits was a "website that has persistently misappropriated and misrepresented Indigenous knowledges". They were alarmed at how highly placed the website was ranked when using Google to search for terms relating to Indigenous Australians. In their research Contesting Digital Colonial Power : Indigenous Australian Sovereignty and Self-Determination in Digital Worlds, Sullivan and McLean collected additional criticisms of Creative Spirits, such as by Indigenous Studies scholar Sandy O'Sullivan who wrote it "appropriates information, takes material published elsewhere and uses it out of context, and is generally problematic", and Gomeroi academic Amy Thunig who wrote it was "the worst site online when it comes to spreading misinformation about First Nations, and unfortunately it is often the first site when you google anything to do with mob. DO NOT USE IT".

In their 2024 paper Indigenous considerations of the potential harms of generative AI, Tamika Worrell and Dorothy Johns found that ChatGPT considered Creative Spirits to be "a reputable website for learning about Aboriginal cultures" and one that had authority. This stood in contrast to the authors' own research showing there was significant criticism towards the website from Indigenous scholars and Indigenous community.
