= Gawambaraay =

Aboriginal Australian language of New South Wales

The Gawambaraay (Kawambarai) are an Aboriginal Australian people of the state of New South Wales, closely connected to the Gamilaraay (Kamilaroi) people. Their traditional lands are in the central–western district of New South Wales

== Name ==
The ethnonym is thought to derive from a language name, kawam being equivalent to guin, and bearing the sense of 'no'. One other word used denoting the tribe, Wirriri also seems to reflect a word for no, namely wir:i

== Language ==
The Gawambaraay or Kawambarai language is a dialect of the Gamilaraay language group.

== Country ==
According to Norman Tindale's estimate, the Kawambarai held sway over roughly 8,000 square miles (21,000 km^{2}) of tribal lands, concentrated on the areas of the upper Castlereagh River, the middle the middle sectors of the Macquarie River and part of Liverpool Plains. Their southern extension ran to the vicinity of present-day Dubbo.

== People ==
Richardson affirmed that the Kawambarai were closely connected to the Gamilaroi.

== Alternative names ==
- Cooinburri
- Gawambarai
- Goinberai
- Guinbrai, Guinberai
- Kawarnparai
- Koinbere, Koinberi
- Koinberri
- Mole tribe
- Wirriri
- Wirriwirri
- Wooratherie

Source: Tindale 1974, p. 195

== Some words ==
- bubbeen/bobbeen/babin (father)
- gunnie/koonie/gunnee/gunnibong (mother)
- kubbun, gibrigal (goeen) (gunwan) (white man)
- meerie/merri (tame dog)
- womboin, bundar

== Sources ==
- Dubbo Magistrates (1887). "Dubbo" (PDF). In Curr, Edward Micklethwaite (ed.). The Australian race: its origin, languages, customs, place of landing in Australia and the routes by which it spread itself over the continent. Vol. 3. Melbourne: J. Ferres. pp. 365, 372–373.
- Gunther, J. (1887). "Wordlist, Castlereagh River, Talbragar, Mudgee" (PDF). In Curr, Edward Micklethwaite (ed.). The Australian race: its origin, languages, customs, place of landing in Australia and the routes by which it spread itself over the continent. Vol. 3. Melbourne: J. Ferres. pp. 364, 368–369.
- Mathews, R. H. (1896). "The Burbung of the Wiradthuri Tribes". The Journal of the Anthropological Institute of Great Britain and Ireland. 26: 295–318. doi:10.2307/2842029. JSTOR 2842029.
- Mathews, R. H. (1902). "Languages of some native tribes of Queensland, New South Wales, and Victoria". Journal of the Proceedings of the Royal Society of New South Wales. 36: 135–190. doi:10.5962/p.359384.
- Mathews, R. H. (July–December 1903). "Languages of the Kamilaroi and Other Aboriginal Tribes of New South Wales". The Journal of the Anthropological Institute of Great Britain and Ireland. 33: 259–283. doi:10.2307/2842812. JSTOR 2842812.
- Richardson, T. L. (1 February 1910). "Aboriginal names and meanings". Science of Man. 11 (10). Sydney: 200.
- Rouse, C. (1887). "Placenames, Warren" (PDF). In Curr, Edward Micklethwaite (ed.). The Australian race: its origin, languages, customs, place of landing in Australia and the routes by which it spread itself over the continent. Vol. 3. Melbourne: J. Ferres. pp. 365, 370–371.
- Tibbetts, W. C. (21 May 1900). "Aboriginal names in the Wooratherie dialect, Macquarrie and Castlereigh Rivers, N.S.W." Science of Man. 3 (4). Sydney: 62–64.
- Tindale, Norman Barnett (1974). "Kawambarai(NSW)". Aboriginal Tribes of Australia: Their Terrain, Environmental Controls, Distribution, Limits, and Proper Names. Australian National University Press. ISBN 978-0-708-10741-6.
