= Sydney rock engravings =

Aboriginal rock art in the Sydney area of Australia

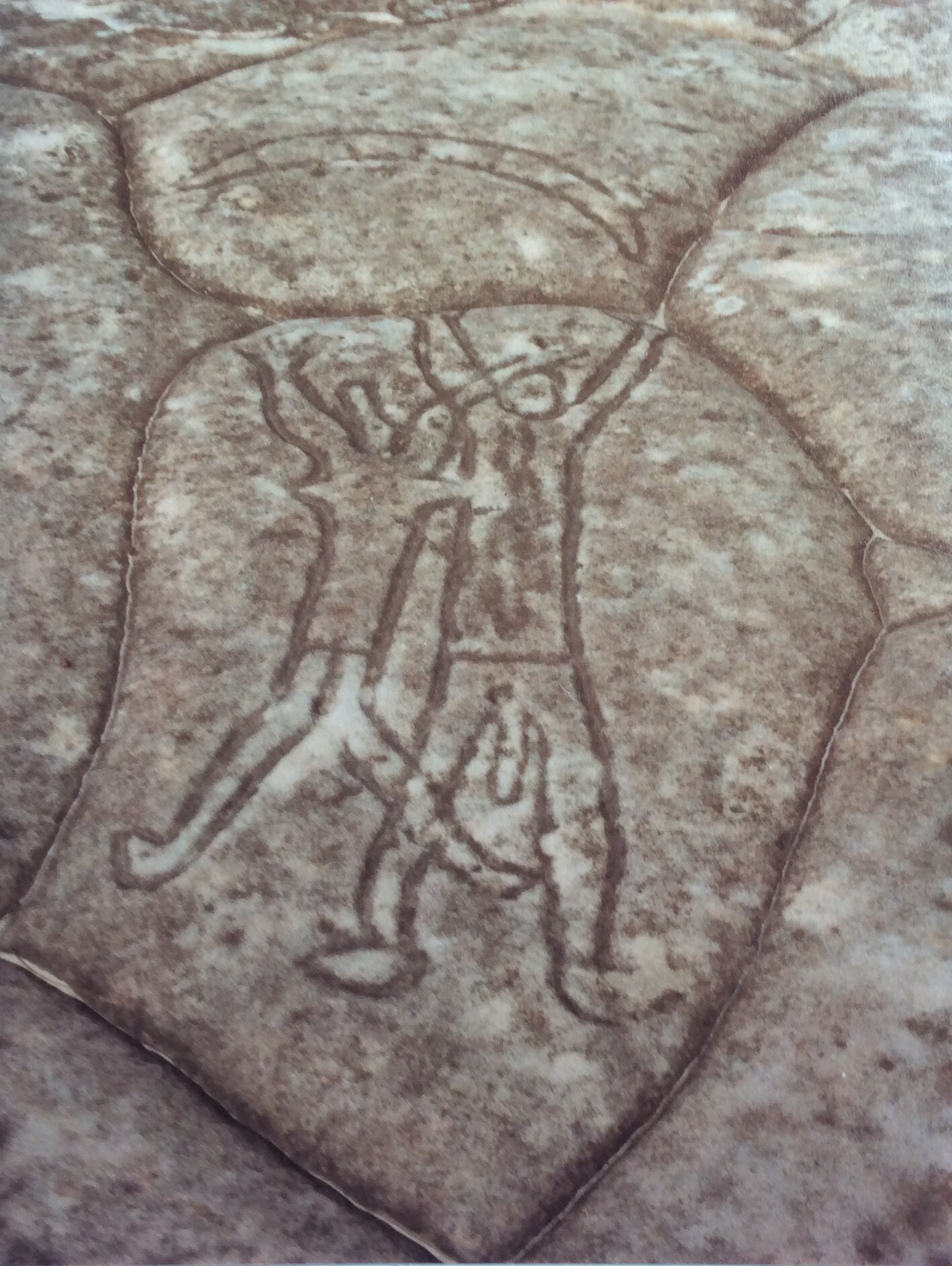
Petroglyph of male and female dancers, in Ku-ring-gai Chase National Park

Sydney rock engravings, or Sydney rock art, comprise a number of Aboriginal rock art sites in the Sydney region, New South Wales, Australia. Carved from Sydney sandstone, they consist of carefully drawn images of people, animals, or symbols. Many thousands of such engravings are known to exist in the Sydney region, although the locations of most are not publicised to prevent damage by vandalism, and to retain their sanctity, as they are still regarded as sacred sites by Aboriginal Australians. There are two art environments in Sydney Basin: rock shelters, and engraving sites.

There are 1,500 pieces of Aboriginal art in Sydney, more than half of which contain rock art, and around 1,500 caves or shelters which contain cultural deposit. They are comparable with the petroglyphs of Native Americans and the rock art found elsewhere in Australia, but have their own distinctive style which is quite unlike rock art found anywhere else in Australia. Dating to around 5,000 years, with some possibly as old as 7,000 years, Sydney rock art is predominantly found in Ku-ring-gai Council, Sydney Harbour and the Blue Mountains.

== Origins and history ==
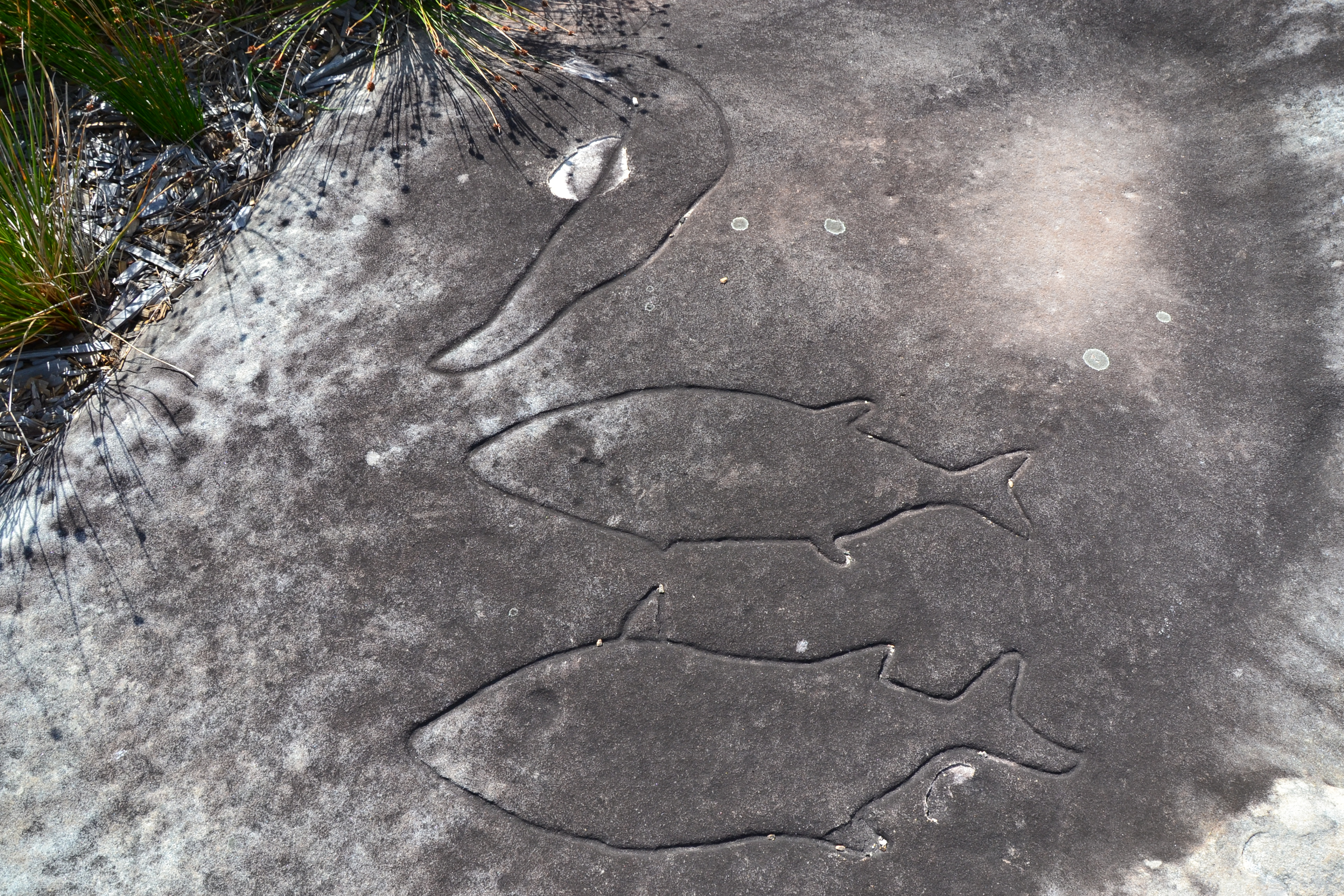
Whale carvings in Bondi

The engravings were made by the Aboriginal Australians who have lived in the Sydney region from about 30,000 years ago until the present day. Radiocarbon dating suggests human activity first started to occur in the Sydney area from around 30,735 years ago (28,724 BCE). However, numerous Aboriginal stone tools were found in Western Sydney's gravel sediments that were dated from 45,000 to 50,000 years BP, which would indicate that there was human settlement in Sydney earlier than previously thought.

The engravings cannot be dated straightforwardly with contemporary archaeological methods, necessitating the use of indirect dating. The Sydney engravings are of a style known as "simple figurative", which formulaic archaeology dates to around 3,000 BC and 4,000 BC, which is contemporaneous to the Neolithic period in Eurasia. Other engravings show European sailing ships, and so those cannot be more than about 200 years old. It is likely that some of the freshest engravings represent the later part of that time range, whilst the most worn represent the earliest part. However, the situation is complicated by the fact that the engravings were sometimes "re-grooved" during ceremonies.

Some engravings appear to show thylacines and other mammals which have been extinct in the Sydney region for many thousands of years, and thus can be presumably that old. In support of this, it is true that rock art elsewhere (e.g. Kakadu National Park) does show extinct animals, and so must be tens of thousands of years old. However, at the moment there is no hard evidence to support these claims for Sydney rock art.

== Method of creation ==
Examination of the grooves shows that they were made in several stages as follows:

- Presumably, a sketched outline was scratched on to the surface of the rock.
- Then a series of holes was drilled along the line, using a pointed stone or shell, which is possible because the Sydney Basin sandstone is relatively soft.
- Finally, the holes were joined by rubbing a sharp stone along the line.

This results in a U-shaped groove which is typically about 2 centimetres deep and 2 centimetres wide. It is easily distinguished from natural grooves in the sandstone, which are usually V-shaped, modern grooves made with steel tools, which are usually narrower and deeper, or those made by bulldozers, which usually have a square section.

The grooves were often maintained by "re-grooving" during ceremonies, which complicates attempts at dating them.

== Purpose ==
While their purpose is not known definitively, some educated guesses may be made by analogy with the culture of other indigenous groups who survived into modern times, as follows. Some sites may have been "increase sites", where a ceremony would be held to increase the availability of a food source such as kangaroos or fish. It is thought that most of the sites depicting animals are of this type.

Another group of sites may have been where initiation ceremonies were held, to celebrate and facilitate the transition of a young boy into manhood. In other parts of Australia, we know that an initiation ceremony often involves a ceremonial path from childhood into manhood, and so the lines of steps, or mundoes, may indicate initiation sites. Other sites show "Culture Heroes" or "Ancestral Beings" such as Baiame, who has a striped head-dress and often a striped body, and Daramulan who has a large club foot and may have been part-emu.

Some sites also show evidence of Aboriginal astronomy, as the rock's patterns resemble the Milky Way and this may have been purposed as an astrological guide. It should also be recognised that increase sites, initiation sites, culture-hero sites, and astronomical sites are not necessarily distinct, and one site may fall into any or all of these categories.

== Themes ==
Engravings at Terrey Hills in northern Sydney. The two kangaroos suggest this was used for an increase ceremony, whilst the well-endowed man may be Baiame.

The Aboriginal rock engraving sites usually contain images of sacred spiritual beings, mythical ancestral hero figures, various endemic animals, fish and many footprints. Surrounding the rock engravings, there are art sites, burial sites, caves, marriage areas, men's areas, women's areas, birthing areas, midden sites, stone arrangement sites, and tool manufacturing locations.

Les McLeod, a local Indigenous guide in Hawkesbury stated, "A lot of Aboriginal people believe they were created from animals – there are engravings here of wallabies, fish and emus. Sydney sandstone is easy to engrave but easy to fade. The Guringai people would have visited a couple of times a year to re-engrave it." In some small cave on the water's edge, there are ochre hand stencils from a group of Guringai men (and from a smaller handprint, a minor). The stencils would have been a way of letting other members of the clan know that this cave or ledge is a safe place to dwell in. Rock paintings of a fish just above the water line signaled to others that fish could be found at this area. The majority (97%) of the etched motifs are outline only. The only systematically infilled engravings are culture heroes which are usually decorated with a number of pecked lines of dots.

=== Characteristics ===
Shelters with art are characterised by stencil art or charcoal. Stencil is created by mixing ochre in the mouth and then into a wet paste, where it is sprayed over the object to be stencilled onto the wall of the shelter. Other forms of artwork include ochre paintings, charcoal drawings and etchings. Rock painting illustration usually feature humans, kangaroos, emus, echidnas, grid patterns, animal tracks, boomerangs, axes, hand stencils, among others. Black is the colour most frequently used in Sydney, accounting for 46.2% of the pigment art, followed by white (34.6%), red (16.6%) and yellow (2.8%). There are also a number of grinding grooves located throughout the general Sydney area. Burial sites are present throughout the Sydney region, and many have been found over the past years in middens and within shelters.

Rock engravings in Sydney often featured fish, animals, humans, wooden artefacts, and mythological beings. Stone quarries are sites where Aboriginals accumulate types of stone for the manufacturing of tools, ceremonial and sacred items. The majority of the fine stone flakes and tools recovered in the local area would have been traded from other areas such as the north coast, Hunter Valley, and the Nepean River. Dug wells in the Sydney region were used by the local tribe to sharpen tools and also as a source of fresh drinking water.

=== Motif frequency ===
A total of 7,804 motifs were studied from the 717 engravings sites, with a salient focus on tracks, followed by a predilection for marine animals and land animals, anthropomorphic models and cultural items.

| Theme | | Frequency % |
|---|---|---|
| 1 | Man | 5.4 |
| 2 | Woman | 1.0 |
| 3 | Anthropomorph | 2.3 |
| 4 | Profile Anthropomorph | 0.9 |
| 5 | Culture Hero | 0.5 |
| 6 | Macropod | 7.0 |
| 7 | Snake | 0.7 |
| 8 | Other Land Animal | 4.0 |
| 9 | Emu | 0.9 |
| 10 | Other Bird | 2.1 |
| 11 | Fish | 11.6 |
| 12 | Eel | 2.3 |
| 13 | Whale | 1.3 |
| 14 | Other Marine Animal | 2.0 |
| 15 | Shield | 3.0 |
| 16 | Boomerang | 3.9 |
| 17 | Axe | 0.6 |
| 18 | Other material object | 2.8 |
| 19 | Unidentified open | 6.1 |
| 20 | Unidentified closed | 9.1 |
| 21 | Hand | 0.2 |
| 22 | Human foot | 17.4 |
| 23 | Kangaroo track | 2.4 |
| 24 | Bird track | 7.0 |
| 25 | Circle | 3.9 |
| 26 | Complex-Non-Figurative | 0.9 |
| 27 | Contact Motif | 0.5 |

== Sites ==
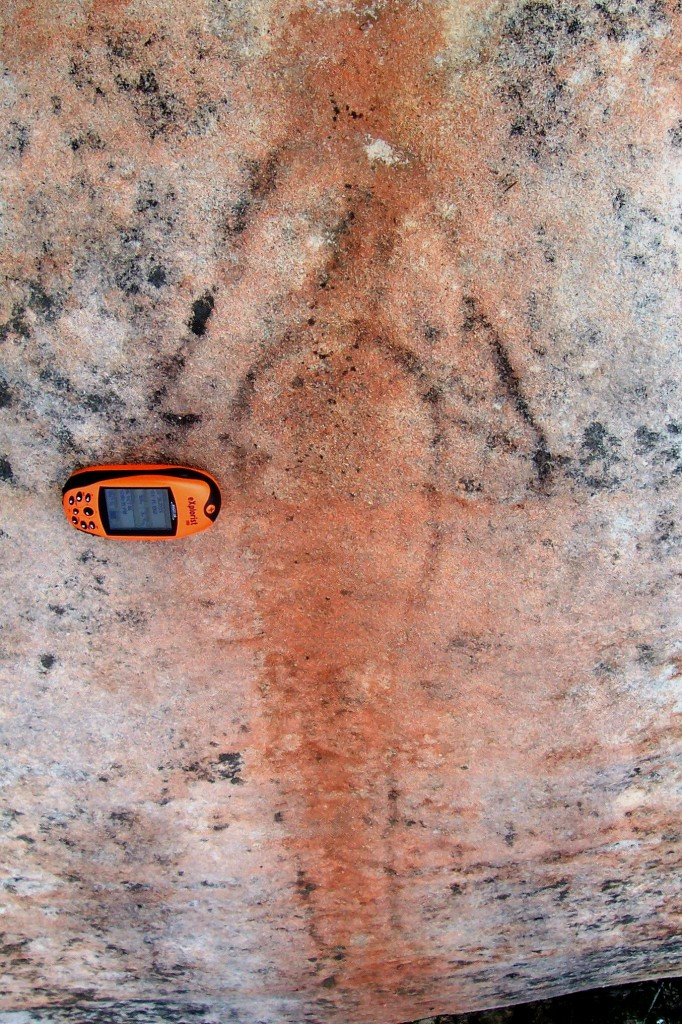
A petroglyph featuring a phallic figure (Ku-ring-gai Chase National Park)

There are approximately 2,000 rock engraving sites, which are usually located on highly elevated, smooth and flat surfaces. More than half of the engraving sites (55.9%) are located on ridgelines. Hillside locations are the next most frequent (41.2%), while valley bottoms are comparatively rare (2.8%). The average distance to drinking water from any engraving site in the region is 650m and the maximum distance is approximately 3km. The minimum distance is 2m (rock wells or creeks). Rock art within Sydney is found in these locations:

Sydney

- Bantry Bay in Garigal National Park, Sydney Harbour (extensive engraving site featuring a wide range of engravings, including animals, people, symbols, and a whale)
- North Bondi Rock Carvings in Bondi Beach (features engravings of humans, sharks, fish, whales and a turtle)
- Allambie Heights (features a whale and many smaller engravings)
- Heathcote National Park, south of Sydney. Various sites are known, including a shield tree west of the Bullawarring Track, adjacent to an occupation cave, plus a group of charcoal drawings alongside Myuna Creek.
- Grotto Point at Dobroyd Head in the Northern Suburbs (well-maintained engraving site within the Sydney metropolitan area, with many engravings)
- Balls Head Reserve in Port Jackson (art sites, middens and a prominent petroglyph of a marine creature)
- Tamarama (large engraving of a shark and fish)
- Berowra Waters (contains vertical rock with a complex of carving)
- Terrey Hills (lone emu on a ledge)
- Ku-ring-gai Chase National Park, north of Sydney (contains many sites, notably those along the Basin Track, the Echidna Track, the Cowan Track and the Red Hand Track)
- Muogamarra Nature Reserve, Hawkesbury River area (contains numerous sites including carvings and grinding grooves)

Blue Mountains

- Faulconbridge (three emus, some mundoes and axe-grinding grooves)
- Lawson (a single kangaroo on a rock)
- Kings Tableland Aboriginal Site, Wentworth Falls (a rocky knoll is topped by a group of large grinding grooves, plus carved images of wallaby, emu tracks and an occupation cave)
- Red Hands Cave, Blue Mountains National Park, outside Glenbrook (contains large collection of hand stencils)
- Wollemi National Park, north of the Blue Mountains (contains many Aboriginal sites, notably at Eagles Reach Cave, discovered by bushwalkers in 1995)

== Gallery ==
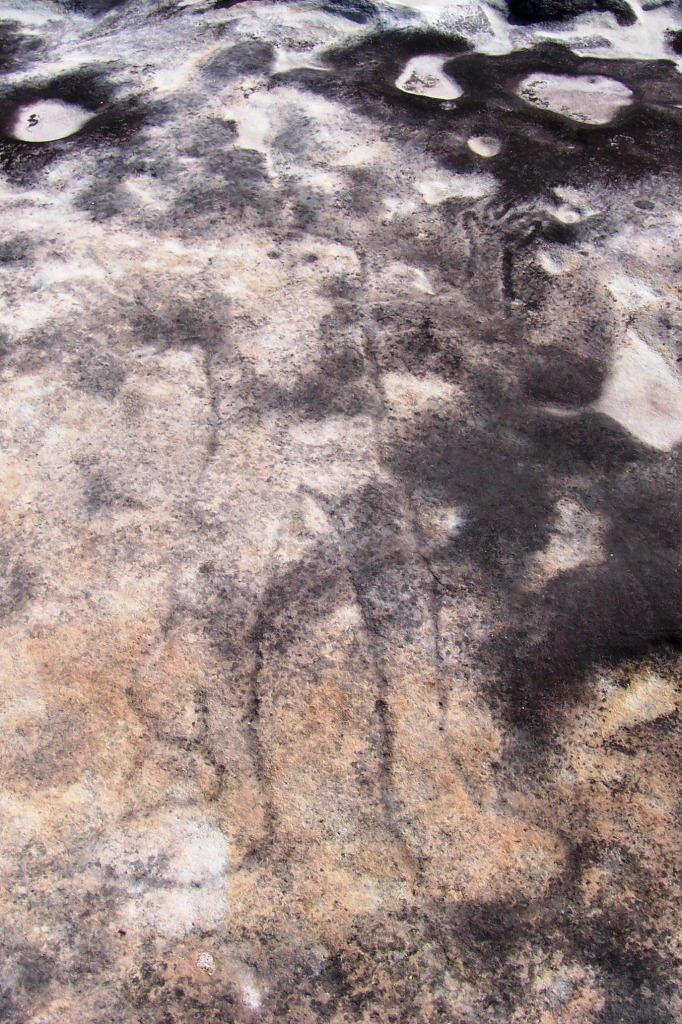
A figure with a swollen leg and the lack of a neck (Ku-ring-gai Chase National Park)

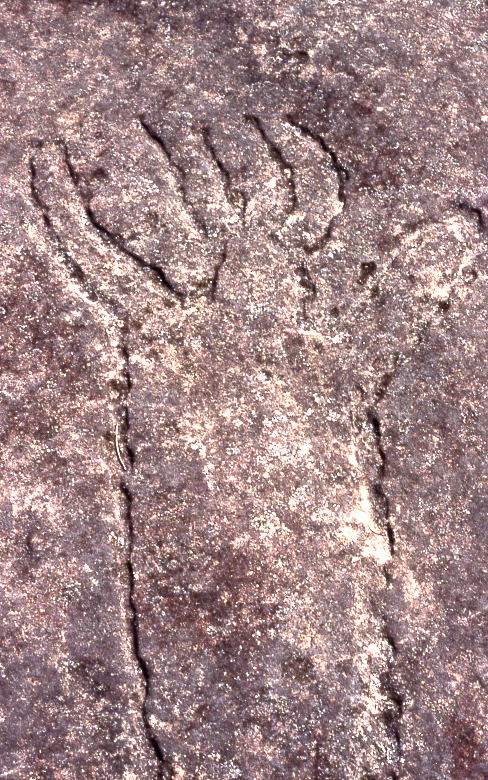
Rock engravings in Terrey Hills

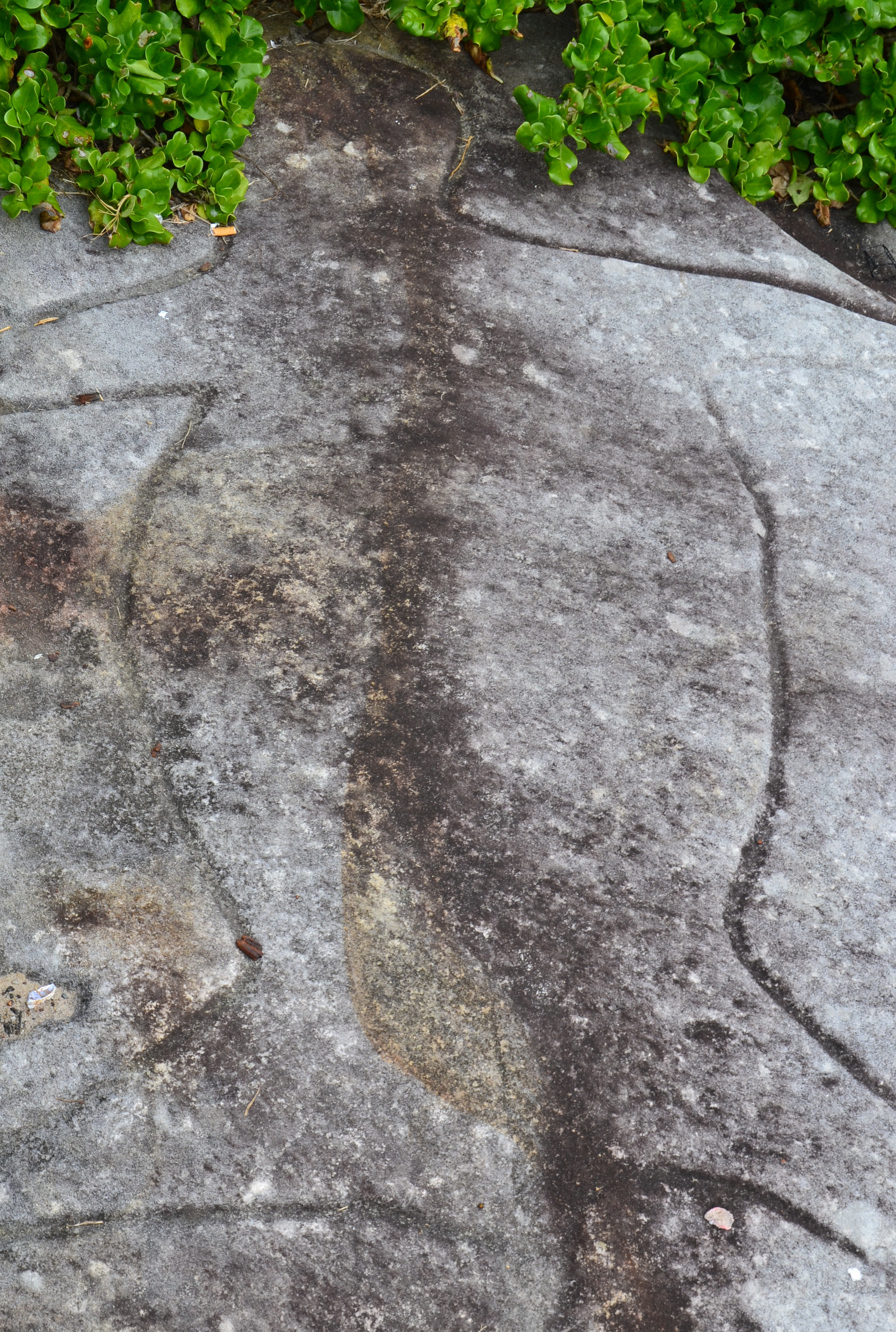
A rock engraving believed to be a turtle at Bondi Beach

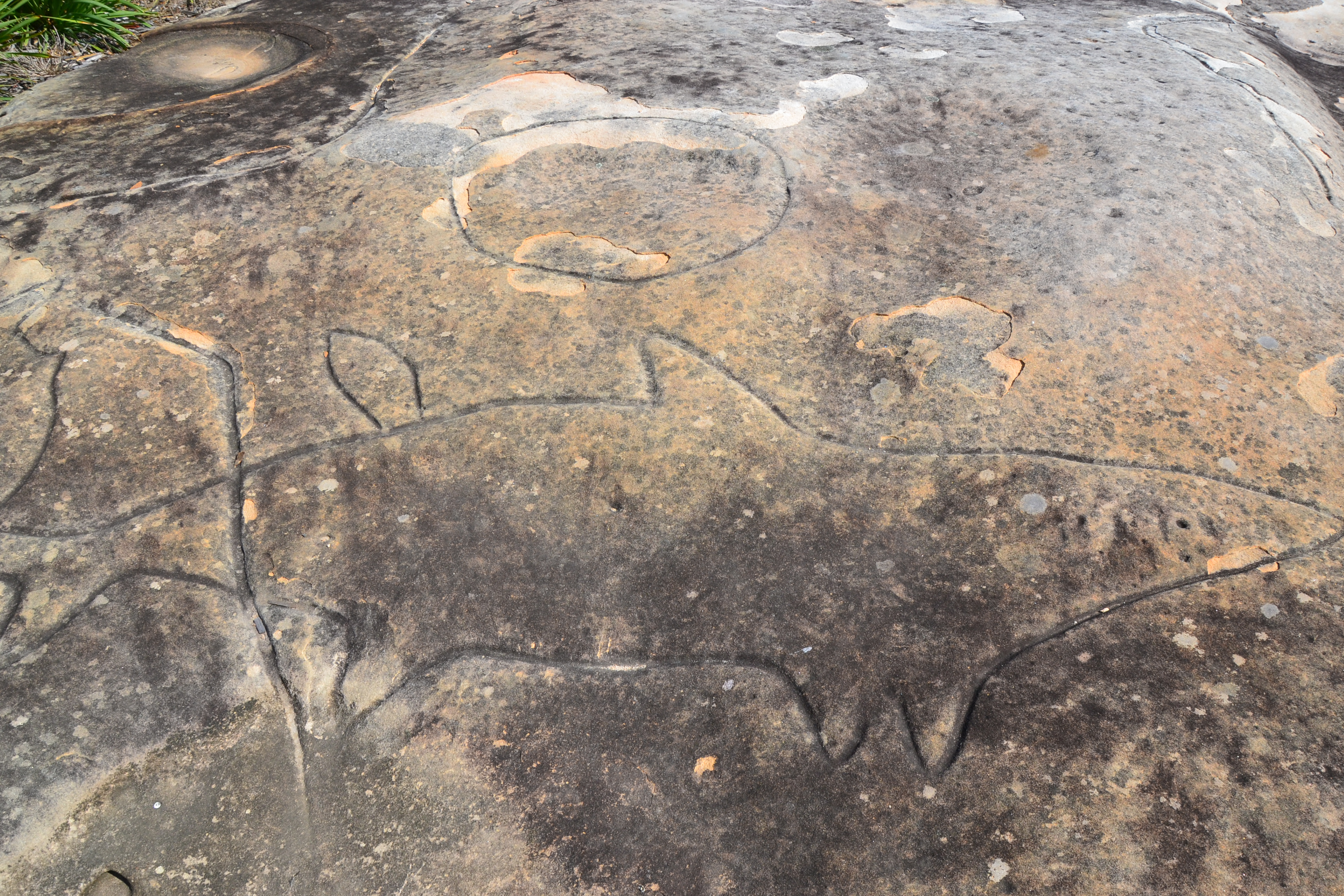
Petroglyph of a shark in North Bondi

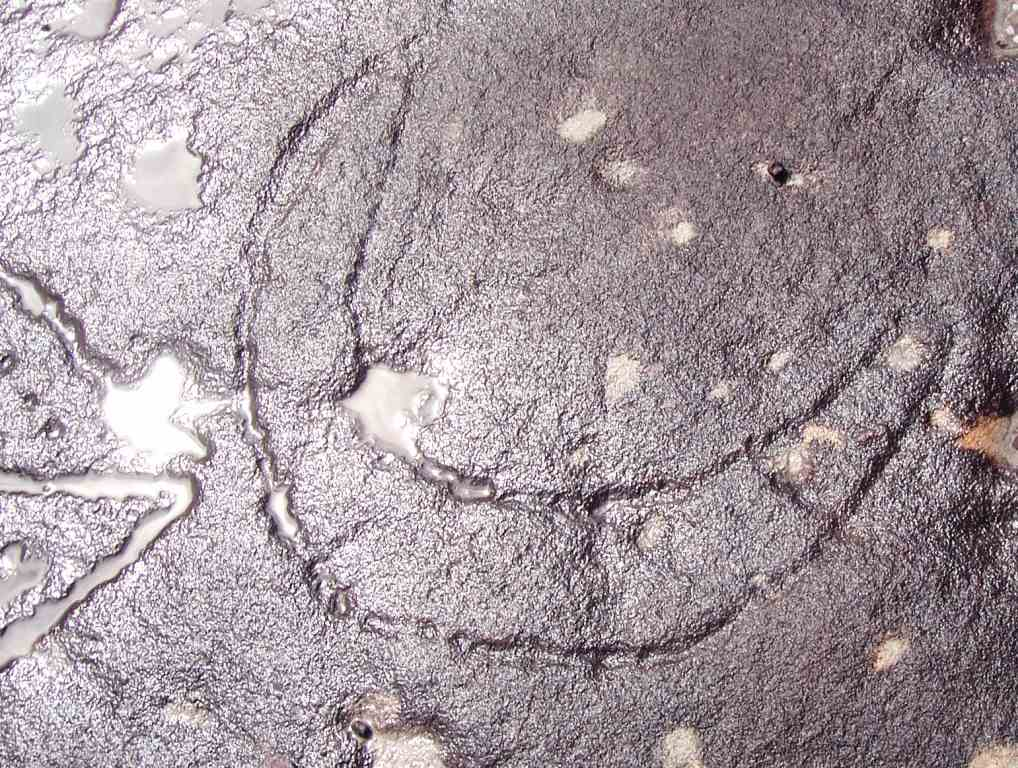
A petroglyph at Ku-ring-gai Chase National Park

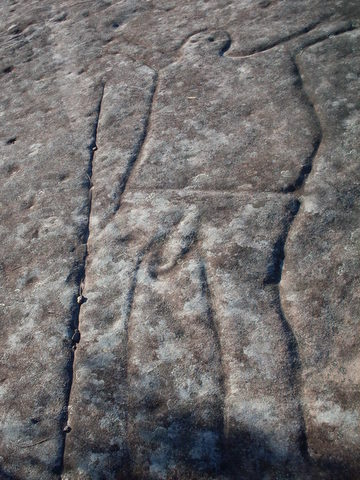
A male figure at KC NP

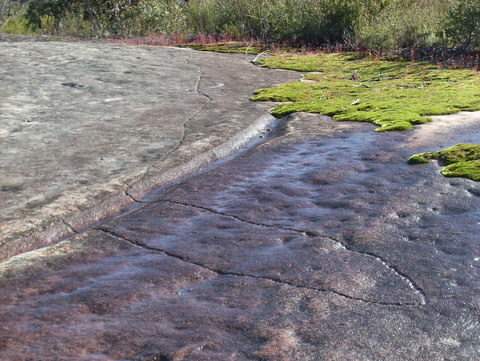
20 metre long petroglyph at KC NP

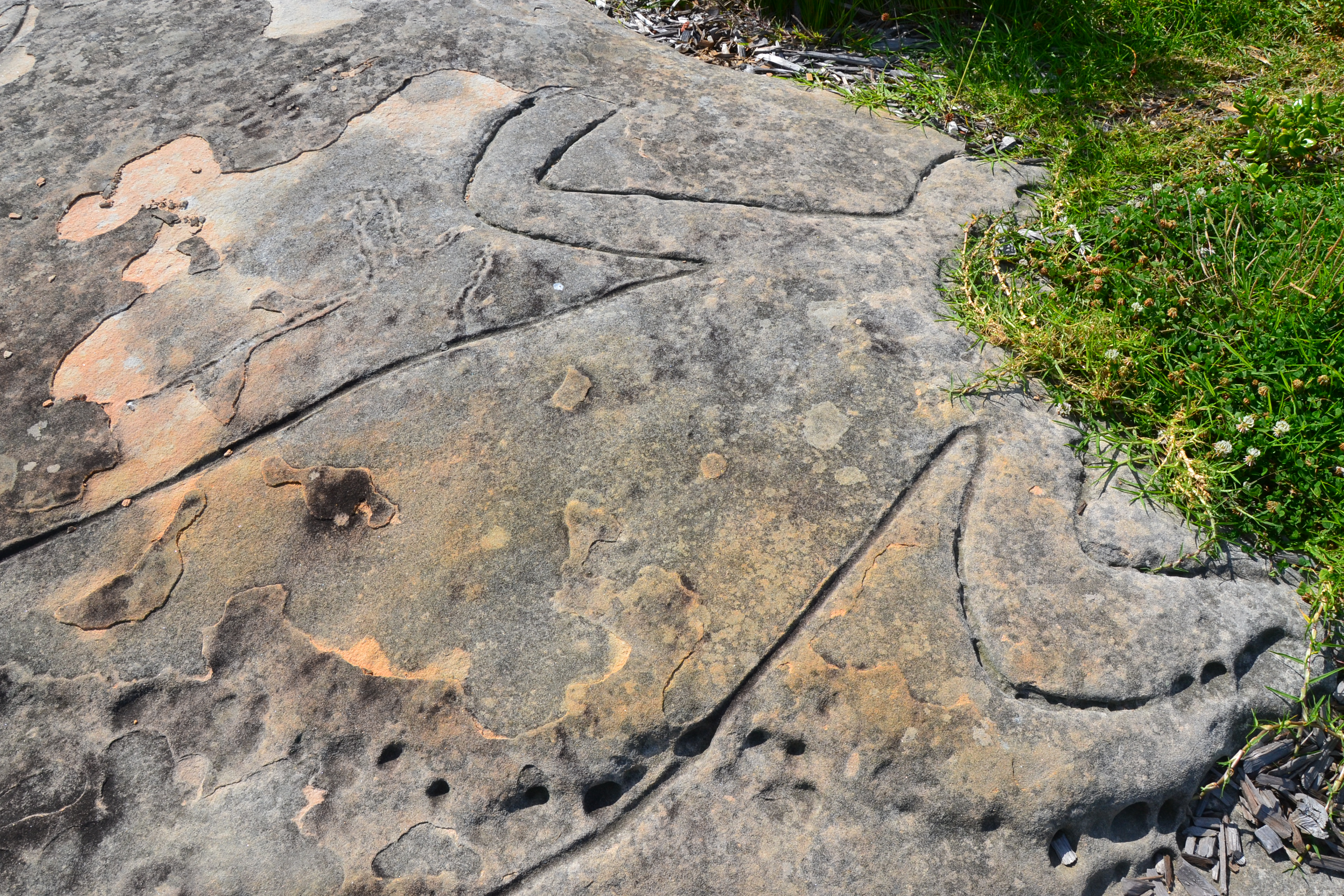
Engraving of a human figure in North Bondi

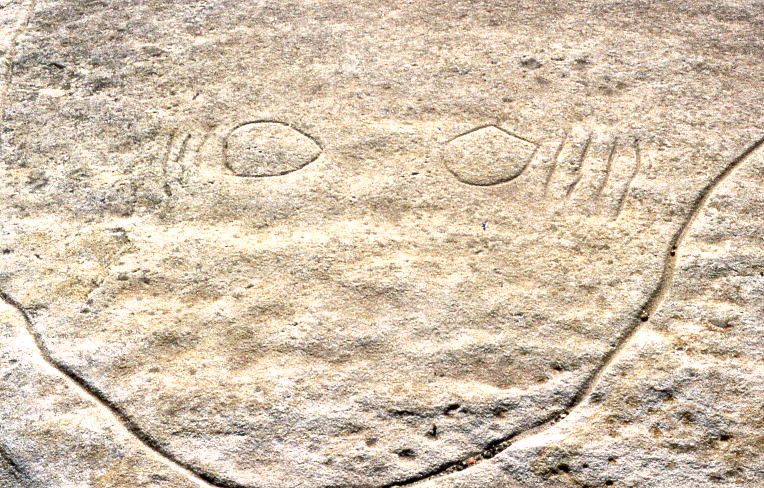
Petroglyph of a whale, Bondi

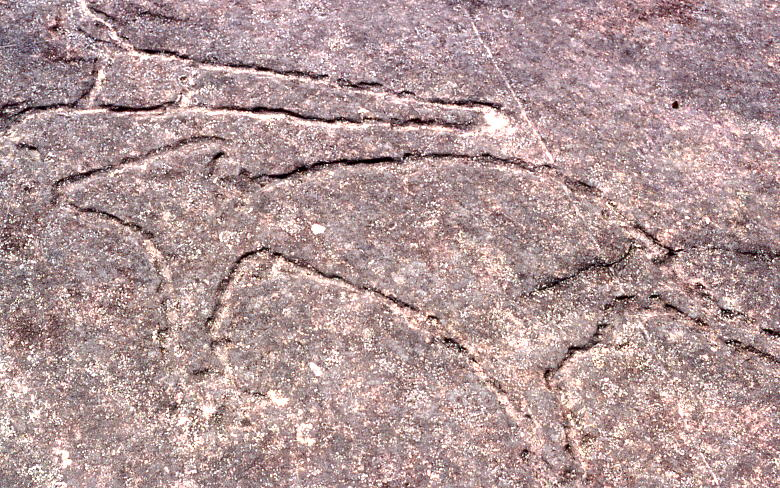
Rock carving in Terrey Hills, featuring kangaroos

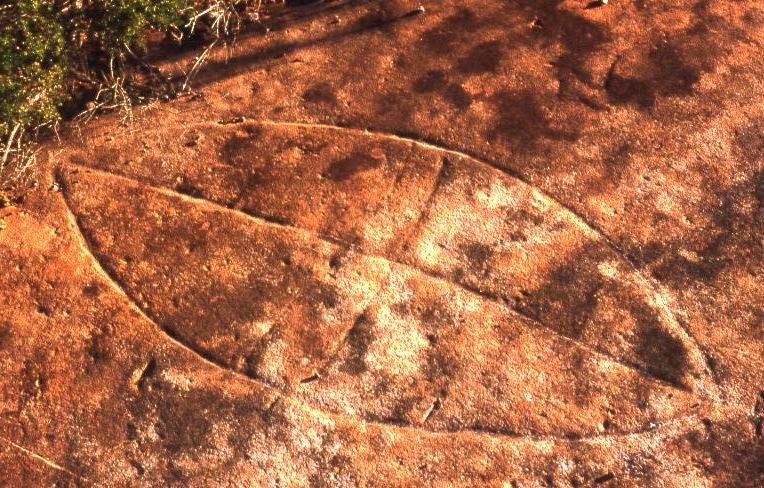
Rock carving in Garigal National Park

== See also ==
- Visual arts of Australia
- Aboriginal sites of New South Wales
- List of Stone Age art
