= Baiame =

Creator god and sky father in Australian Aboriginal mythology

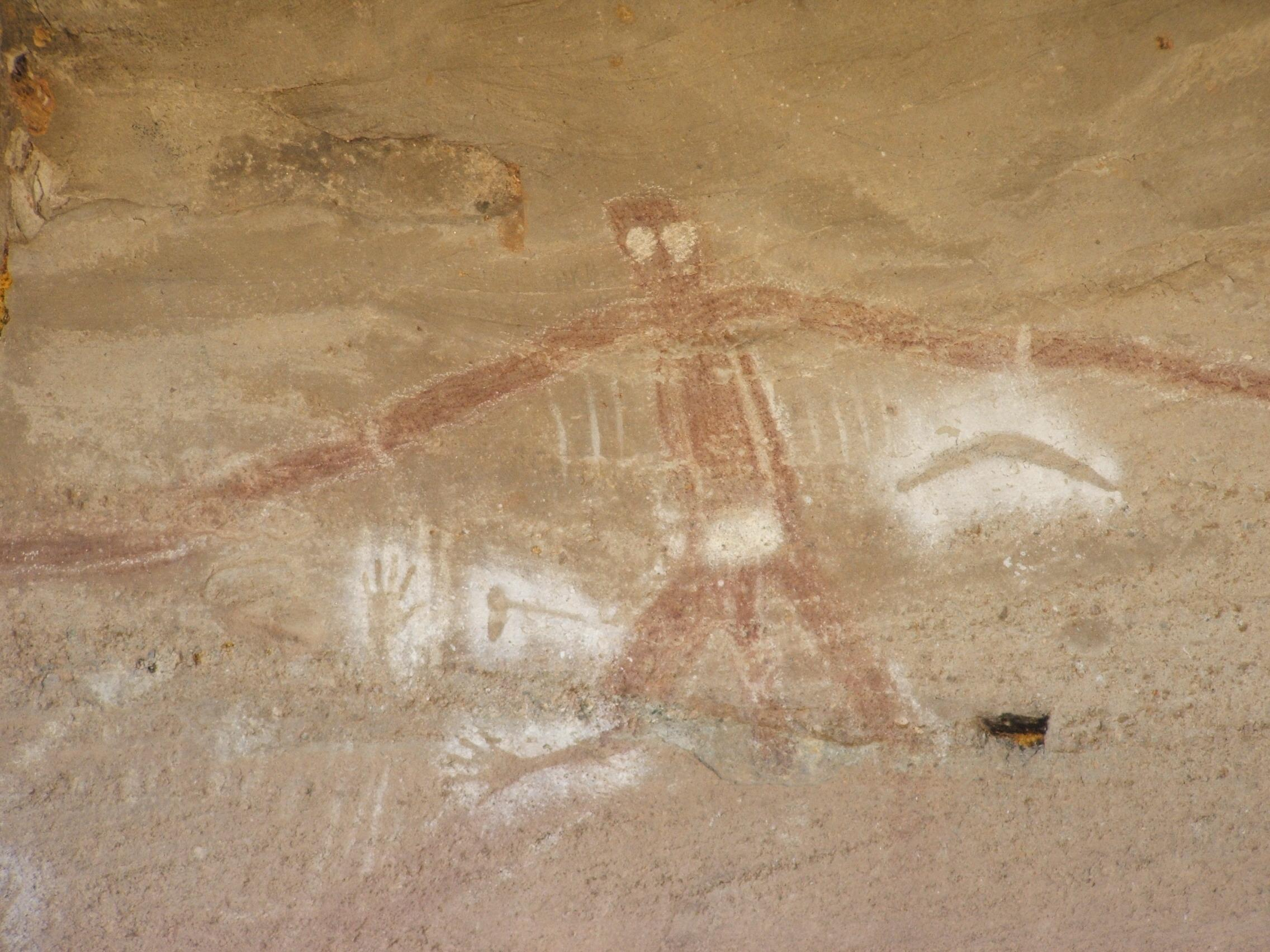
Wonnarua painting of Baiame, near Milbrodale, (south of Singleton, New South Wales). Note that his arms extend to the two trees either side.

In Australian Aboriginal mythology, Baiame (or Biame, Biami, Baayami, Baayama or Byamee) is the creator god and sky father in the Dreaming of several Aboriginal Australian peoples of south-eastern Australia, such as the Wonnarua, Kamilaroi, Guringay, Eora, Darkinjung, and Wiradjuri peoples.

== Description and history ==
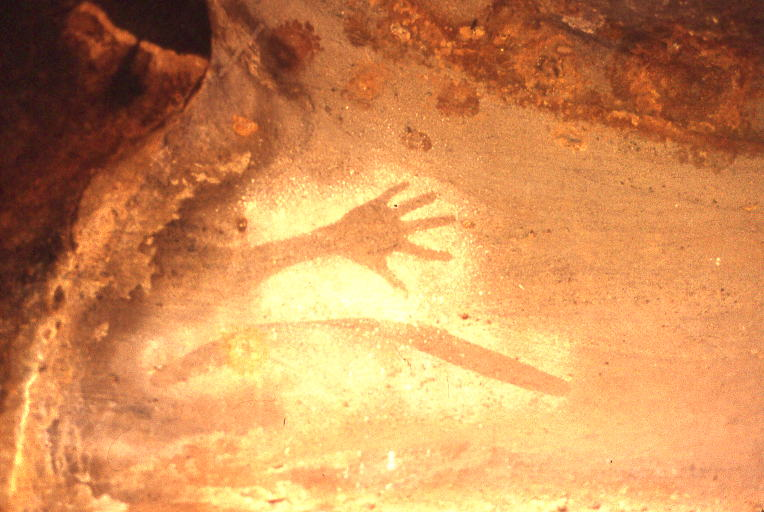
Baiame Cave, details

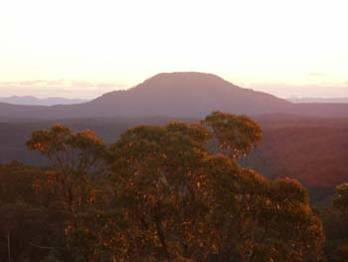
Mount Yengo

The Baiame story tells how Baiame came down from the sky to the land and created rivers, mountains, and forests in all the lands. He then gave the people their laws of life, traditions, songs, and culture. He also created the first initiation site. This is known as a bora; a place where boys were initiated into manhood. When he had finished, he returned to the sky and people called him the Sky Hero or All Father or Sky Father.

He is said to have two wives, Ganhanbili and Birrangulu, the latter often being identified as an emu, and with whom he has a son Dharramalan. In other stories Dharramalan is said to be brother to Baiame.

It was forbidden to mention or talk about the name of Baiame publicly. Women were not allowed to see drawings of Baiame nor approach Baiame sites, which are often male initiation sites (boras).

In rock paintings Baiame is often depicted as a human figure with a large head-dress or hairstyle, with lines of footsteps nearby. He is always painted in front view; Dharramalan is drawn in profile. Baiame is often shown with internal decorations such as waistbands, vertical lines running down the body, bands and dots.

== Attempted link with God in Christianity ==
The missionary William Ridley adopted the name of Baiame for the Christian God when translating into Gamilaraay (the language of the Kamilaroi). It is sometimes suggested that Baiame was a construct of early Christian missionaries, but K Langloh Parker dated belief in Baiame to (at latest) 1830, prior to missionary activity in the region.

== Portrayal in the Awaba (Lake Macquarie) area ==
In the area surrounding Awaba (Lake Macquarie) in New South Wales, Australia, he was believed to have created all of the mountains, lakes, rivers and caves in the area. After he finished creating, he jumped back up to the spirit world from Mount Yengo, which he flattened. Its flat top can still be seen to this day, near Wollombi Valley. A cave near Milbrodale contains many Wonnarua Aboriginal paintings, including a large figure of a man who may be Baiame. It is popularly known as the Baiame Cave and is part of a series of rock shelters on an area of 80 hectares. The site is listed on the Register of the National Estate and is considered a sacred site.

== See also ==
- Aboriginal mythology
- Aboriginal sites of New South Wales
