= Birrangulu =

Goddess of fertility in Australian Aboriginal mythology

In Gamilaraay mythology, Birrangulu (‘face like an axe handle’, from birra ‘axe handle’ and ngulu ‘forehead’) or Birrahgnooloo is a fertility spirit who would send floods if properly asked. She is said to have had a long thin face.

Birrangulu is one of two wives of Baiame, with whom she is the mother of Daramulum.

In the Guwamu language, Birrangula, is a name of the Creator.
