= Vaucluse Bay Range Rear Light =

Lighthouse in New South Wales, Australia

- Location: Vaucluse; New South Wales; Australia
- Coordinates: 33°51′29.47″S 151°16′22.58″E

Tower
- Constructed: 1884 (first)
- Construction: concrete tower
- Height: 26 feet (7.9 m)
- Shape: cylindrical tower with balcony and lantern
- Markings: white tower and conical roof

Light
- First lit: 1910 (current)
- Focal height: 275 feet (84 m)
- Range: 5 nautical miles (9.3 km)
- Characteristic: F R

Vaucluse Bay Range Rear Light is an active lighthouse located on the east side of the entrance to Vaucluse Bay in Vaucluse, New South Wales, Australia. It serves as the rear range light companion to the Vaucluse Bay Range Front Light, into Vaucluse Bay. The distance between the two lights is 945 metres (3,100 ft).

It is one of four lighthouses in a style sometimes called "Disney Castle", the others being Grotto Point Light, Parriwi Head Light and Vaucluse Bay Range Front Light.

The light shines through a window.

== Site operation and visiting ==
The light is operated by the Sydney Ports Corporation. It is located on private land, and is not accessible to the public, but it is easily seen from 12 Wentworth Road.

== See also ==
- List of lighthouses in Australia
