= Vaucluse Bay Range Front Light =

Lighthouse in New South Wales, Australia

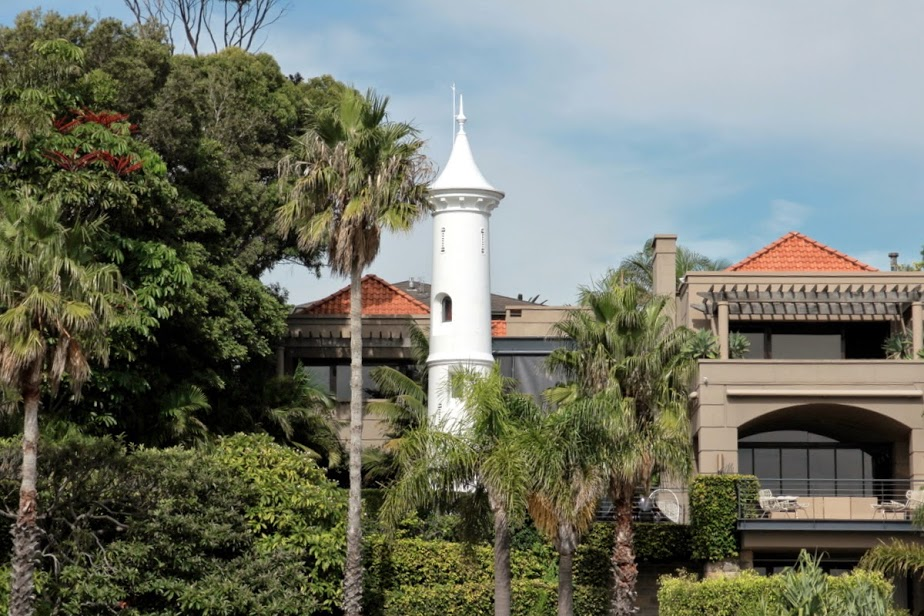
- Vaucluse Bay Range Front Light
- Location: Vaucluse; New South Wales; Australia
- Coordinates: 33°50′58.41″S 151°16′26.11″E

Tower
- Constructed: 1884 (first)
- Construction: concrete
- Height: 26 feet (7.9 m)
- Shape: cylindrical tower with conical roof
- Markings: white tower and roof
- Operator: Port Authority of New South Wales

Light
- First lit: 1910 (current)
- Focal height: 52 feet (16 m)
- Range: 5 nautical miles (9.3 km)
- Characteristic: F R

Vaucluse Bay Range Front Light is an active lighthouse located on the east side of the entrance to Vaucluse Bay in Vaucluse, New South Wales, Australia. It serves as the front range light (Vaucluse Bay Range Rear Light serving as the rear light) into Vaucluse Bay. The distance between the lights is 945 metres (3,100 ft).

It is one of four lighthouses designed in a style sometimes called "Disney Castle", the others being Grotto Point Light, Parriwi Head Light and Vaucluse Bay Range Rear Light.

The light shines through a window.

== Site operation and visiting ==
The light is operated by the Sydney Ports Corporation. It is located on private land and is not accessible to the public. Viewing the lighthouse from the street (80 Wentworth Road) is very difficult due to the steep terrain, so the lighthouse is best viewed from the water.

== See also ==
- List of lighthouses in Australia
