= Mundara Koorang =

Australian artist and writer

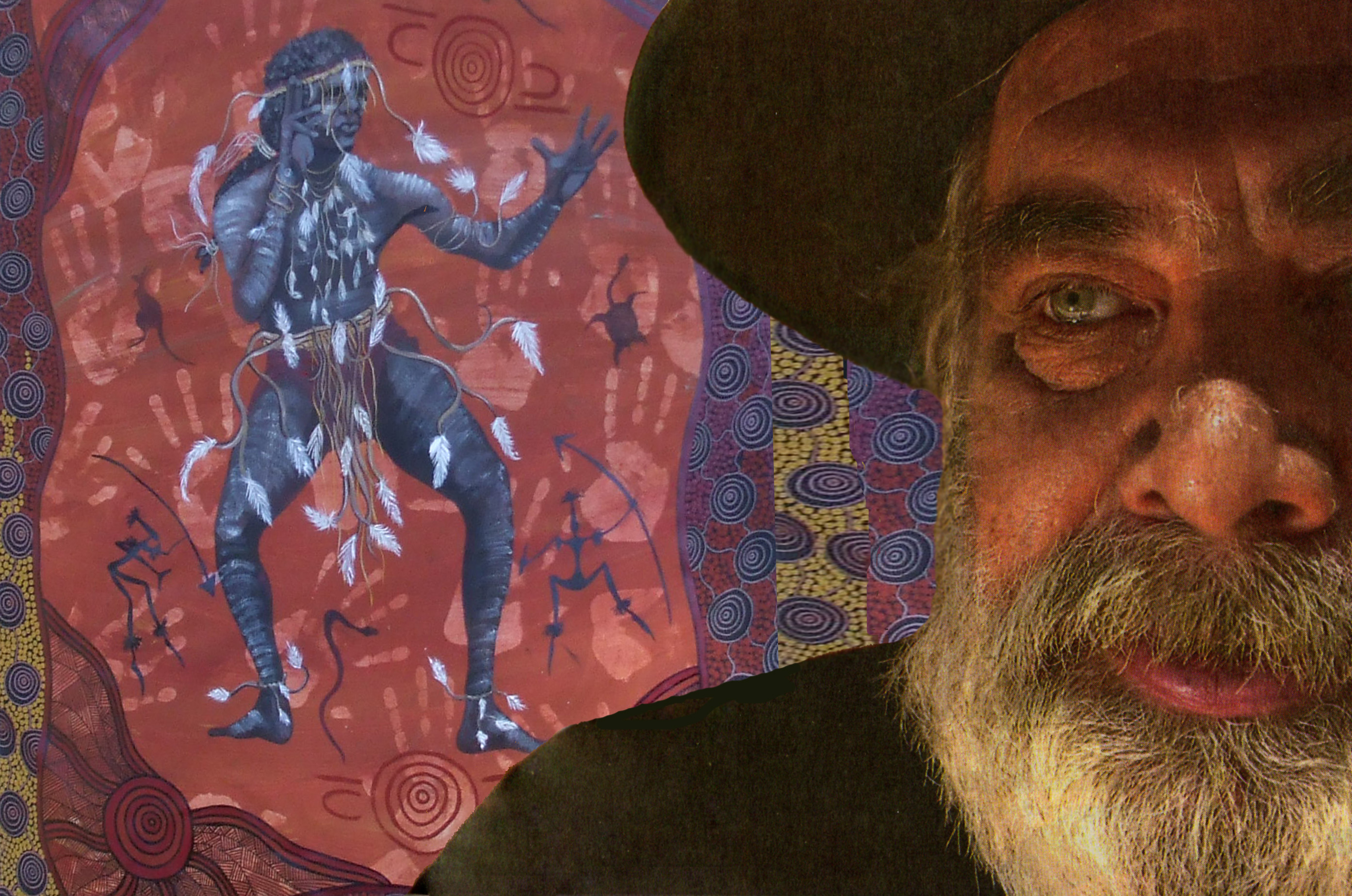
- Australian Aboriginal artist Mundara Koorang
- Born: 1952 (age 73–74); Eora (Sydney), New South Wales, Australia
- Occupations: Artist; Designer; Teacher; Elder; Actor; Author
- Notable work: The Little Platypus and the Fire Spirit (2005)
- Website: Official website

Mundara Koorang is an Australian Aboriginal artist, designer, teacher, elder, actor, and author.

Mundara was born in 1952 in the Eora (Sydney) NSW area and is descendant of the Gamilaroi people. Mundara’s grandmother, great grandmother and great-great grandmother were all born in the Barwon River, Brewarrina area.

In 2005 Mundara published a Dreamtime story entitled The Little Platypus and the Fire Spirit.
