= Parriwi Head Light =

Lighthouse in New South Wales, Australia

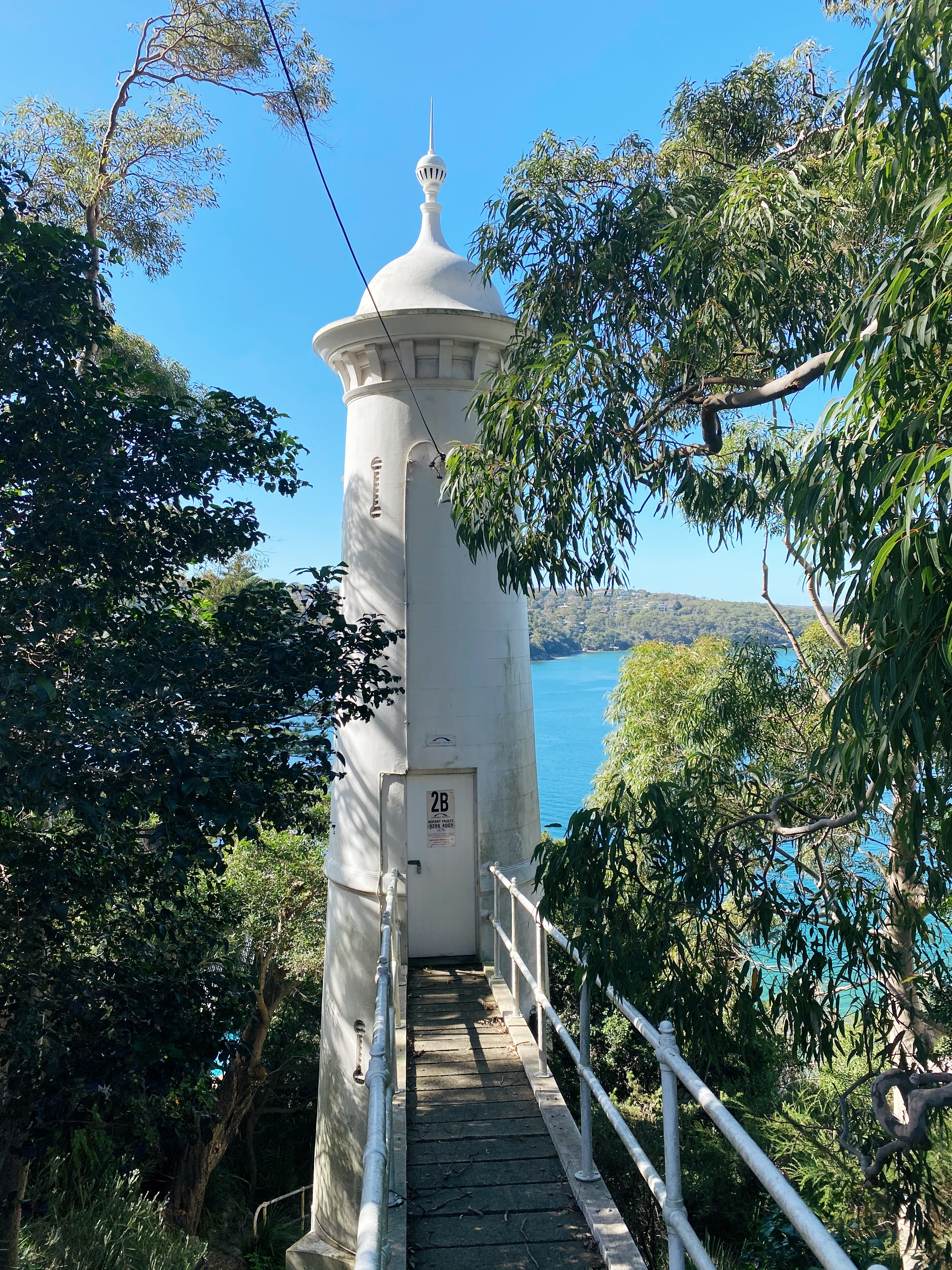
- Parriwi Head Light, off Parriwi Road, Mosman NSW
- Location: Mosman; New South Wales; Australia
- Coordinates: 33°48′43.7″S 151°14′46.95″E

Tower
- Constructed: 1911
- Construction: concrete tower
- Height: 50 feet (15 m)
- Shape: cylindrical] domed tower
- Markings: white tower and lantern
- Operator: Mosman Municipal Council

Light
- Focal height: 142 feet (43 m)
- Range: 12 nautical miles (22 km)
- Characteristic: Fl G 3s.

Parriwi Head Light, also known as Rosherville Light and Port Jackson Entrance Range Rear Light, is an active lighthouse located just off Parriwi Road, near Rosherville Reserve on the south side of Middle Harbour in Mosman, New South Wales, Australia. It serves as the rear range light, Grotto Point Light serving as the front light, into Port Jackson. Grotto Point Light is located approximately 1 mile (1.6 km), 1,690 yards (1,550 m) to be exact, in front of Parriwi Head Light.

It is one of four lighthouses built in a style now sometimes called "Disney Castle", the others being Grotto Point Light, Vaucluse Bay Range Front Light and Vaucluse Bay Range Rear Light.

The light is shone through a horizontal slit just below the dome.

== Site operation ==
The light is operated by the Port Authority of NSW, while the site is managed by the Mosman Municipal Council as part of the Parriwi Lighthouse Park.

== Visiting ==
The site is open and accessible to the public, but the tower itself is closed.

== See also ==
- List of lighthouses in Australia
