= Donna Hartz =

Aboriginal Australian midwife and academic

Donna Hartz is an Aboriginal Australian midwife, academic and member of the Kamilaroi peoples of north eastern New South Wales. She grew up in the western suburbs of Sydney.

Hartz is currently an associate professor of midwifery at Charles Darwin University.

Hartz is best known for her work on the "Birthing on Country" project, focused on Aboriginal maternal health. She is an investigator on an NHMRC Partnership Grant, ‘BOOSt: Building on Our Strengths’. Hartz has focused on developing and implementing community-controlled, holistic, continuity of midwifery care models and birth centres. She has been an advocate for women-centred continuity of care through caseload midwifery models.

Hartz is a registered nurse and midwife. She has been an academic leader at the University of Sydney’s National Centre of Cultural Competence, an adjunct associate professor at the School of Nursing and Midwifery at Western Sydney University and a casual academic at the University of Technology Sydney. Hartz was on the Board of Trustees at the Rhodanthe Lipsett Indigenous Midwifery Charitable Fund.
