= Gurre kamilaroi =

Manual of Biblical instruction for the Kamilaroi people

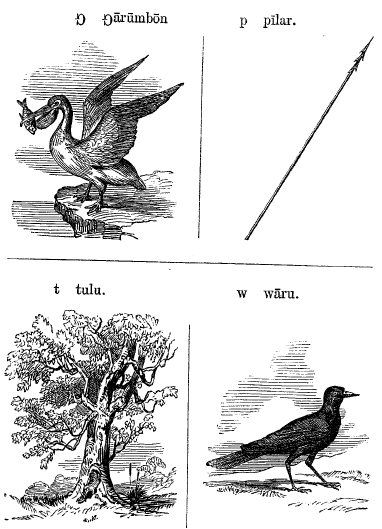
Page from gurre kamilaroi or Kamilaroi Sayings

gurre kamilaroi or Kamilaroi Sayings is a manual of Biblical instruction for the Kamilaroi people in their own language, produced by William Ridley and published in Sydney in 1856.

Ridley wanted to make sure that the text was easy for those just learning to read. Majuscules were avoided, so that only one letter shape would have to be learnt. He represented the sound of "ng" with a single letter, ‹ŋ›, as it is a single sound. He insisted that the letters ‹g›, ‹h›, ‹r›, ‹w›, and ‹y› be called ge (as in get), he, re, we and ye, so that they would correspond better to the sound they represent.
