= Gamilaraay language =

Australian Aboriginal language

Gamilaraay
- Darling tributaries Kamilaroi
- Gamilaraay
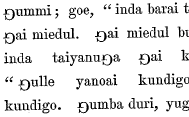
- gurre kamilaroi, a 19th-century Gamilaraay text
- Pronunciation: [ɡ̊aˌmilaˈɻaːj]
- Native to: Australia
- Region: Central northern New South Wales
- Ethnicity: Gamilaraay, Ualarai, Kawambarai
- Native speakers: 1,065 (2021 census)
- Language family: Pama–Nyungan: Wiradhuric; Gamilaraay
- Dialects: Gamilaraay (Kamilaroi); Yuwaalaraay (Euahlayi); Yuwaalayaay (Yuwaaliyaay); Guyinbaraay (Gunjbaraay); Gawambaraay (Kawambarai); Wirray Wirray (Wiriwiri); Waalaraay (Walaraay)

Language codes
- ISO 639-3: kld
- Glottolog: gami1243
- AIATSIS: D23
- ELP: Gamilaraay
- Yuwaalaraay
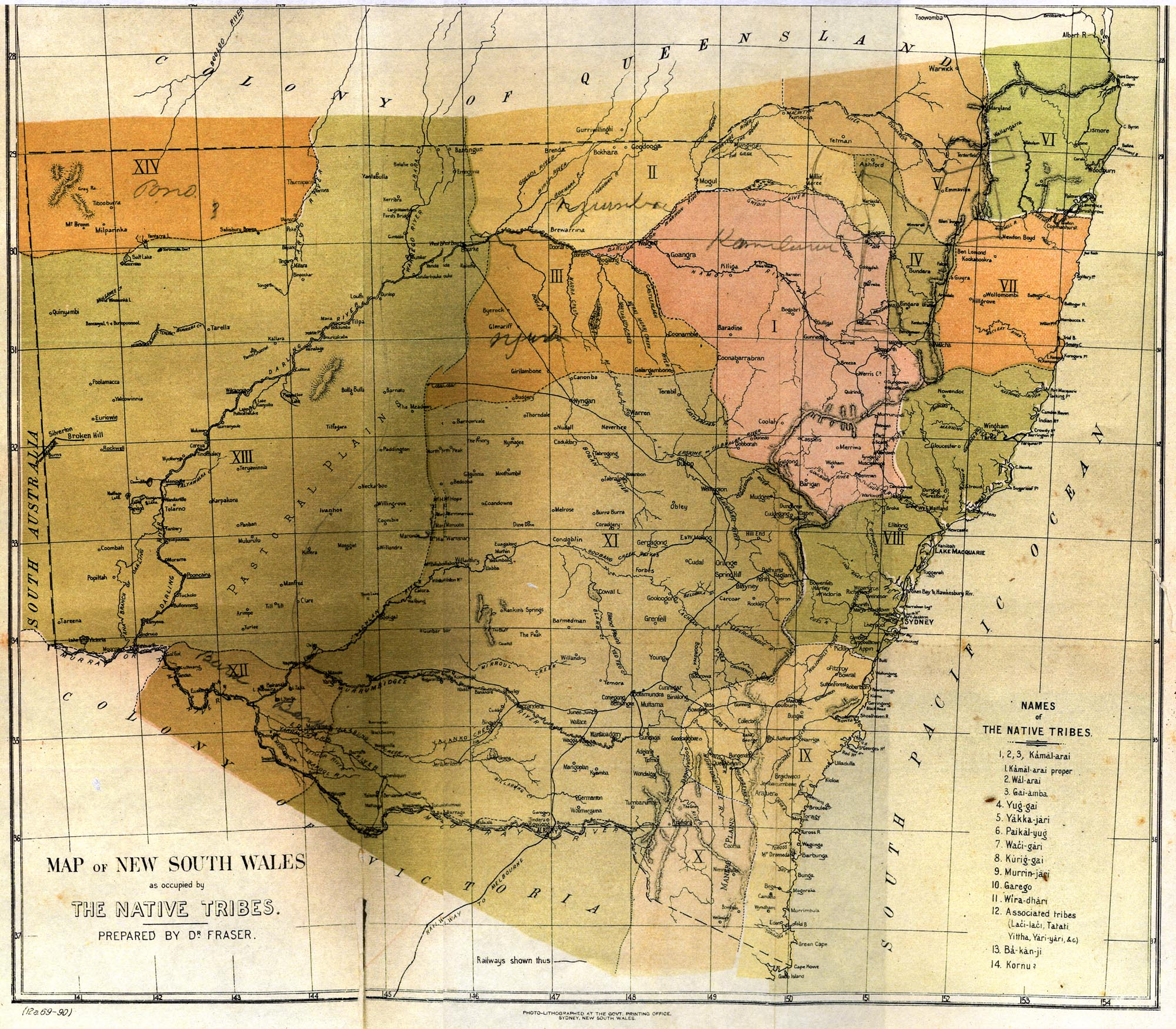
- A map of the tribes of New South Wales, published in 1892. Gamilaraay is marked I.

- Gamilaraay is classified as Critically Endangered by the UNESCO Atlas of the World's Languages in Danger.

The Gamilaraay or Kamilaroi language (Gamilaraay pronunciation: [ɡ̊aˌmilaˈɻaːj]) is a Pama–Nyungan language of the Wiradhuric subgroup found mostly in south-eastern Australia. It is the traditional language of the Gamilaraay (Kamilaroi), an Aboriginal Australian people. It has been noted as endangered, but the number of speakers grew from 87 in the 2011 Australian Census to 105 in the 2016 Australian Census. Thousands of Australians identify as Gamilaraay, and the language is taught in some schools.

Wirray Wirray, Guyinbaraay, Yuwaalayaay, Waalaraay and Gawambaraay are dialects; Yuwaalaraay/Euahlayi is a closely related language.

== Name ==
The name Gamilaraay means 'gamil-having', with gamil being the word for 'no'. Other dialects and languages are similarly named after their respective words for 'no'. (Compare the division between langues d'oïl and langues d'oc in France, distinguished by their respective words for 'yes'.)

Spellings of the name, pronounced [ɡ̊aˌmilaˈɻaːj] in the language itself, include Goomeroi; Kamilaroi; Gamilaraay and Gamilaroi.

== Dialects ==
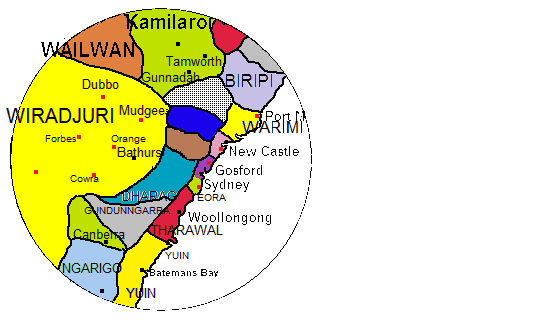
Traditional lands of Australian Aboriginal tribes around Sydney, New South Wales. Gamilaraay in green. (Note: This map is indicative only.)

While AUSTLANG cites Euahlayi, Ualarai, Euhahlayi, and Juwalarai as synonyms for Gamilaraay in earlier sources, it has updated its codes to reflect more recent sources that suggest different distinctions. AIATSIS groups the Yuwaalaraay/Euahlayi/Yuwaaliyaay language and people in its resource collection, and gives it a separate code (D23). AUSTLANG assigns separate codes to the following dialects, all related and part of the Gamilaraay group:

- Yuwaalaraay (Yuwaaliyaay, Euahlayi) (D27), spoken by the Yuwaalaraay people; (Note: For more information on the Euahlayi dialect and tribe, see Parker, K. Langloh (Katie Langloh); Lang, Andrew, 1844–1912 (1905), The Euahlayi tribe : a study of Aboriginal life in Australia, Archibald Constable – via The Gutenberg Bible.)
- Wirray Wirray (Wiriwiri) (D28); (Note: Not to be confused with Wirraay-Wirraay (D66).)
- Guyinbaraay (Gunjbaraay) (D15);
- Yuwaalayaay (D54); (Note: Closely related to Yuwaalaaray, but different.)
- Waalaraay (Walaraay) (D55);
- Gawambaraay (Kawambarai) (D39), spoken by the Gawambaraay people.

According to Robert Fuller of the Department of Indigenous Studies at Macquarie University and his colleagues, the Gamilaraay and Euahlayi peoples are a cultural grouping of north and northwest New South Wales (NSW), and the Gamilaraay dialect groups are known as Gamilaraay and Yuwaalaraay, while the Euahlayi (Euayelai) have a similar but distinct language.

== History ==
Southern Aboriginal guides led the surveyor John Howe to the upper Hunter River above present-day Singleton in 1819. They told him that the country there was "Coomery Roy [=Gamilaraay] and more further a great way", meaning to the north-west, over the Liverpool Ranges. This is probably the first record of the name.

A basic wordlist collected by Thomas Mitchell in 1832 is the earliest written record of Gamilaraay.

Presbyterian missionary William Ridley studied the language from 1852 to 1856.

=== Status ===
In 2013 Gamilaraay was noted as endangered by Ethnologue, with only 35 speakers left in 2006 (AUSTLANG says 37 at that date), all mixing Gamilaraay and English. At the 2011 census there were 87 speakers recorded and in 2016, 105. There are no known fluent speakers of the language.

== Phonology ==
=== Vowels ===
	Front	Back
High	i ⟨i⟩, iː ⟨ii⟩	u ⟨u⟩, uː ⟨uu⟩
Low	a ⟨a⟩, aː ⟨aa⟩	

/wa/ is realised as [wo].

=== Consonants ===
	Peripheral		Laminal		Apical	
	Bilabial	Velar	Palatal	Dental	Alveolar	Post- alveolar
Stop	b ⟨b⟩	ɡ ⟨g⟩	ɟ ⟨dj⟩	d̪ ⟨dh⟩	d ⟨d⟩	
Nasal	m ⟨m⟩	ŋ ⟨ng⟩	ɲ ⟨ny⟩	n̪ ⟨nh⟩	n ⟨n⟩	
Lateral					l ⟨l⟩	
Rhotic					r ⟨rr⟩	ɻ ⟨r⟩
Semivowel	w ⟨w⟩		j ⟨y⟩			

Initially, /wu/ and /ji/ may be simplified to [u] and [i].

=== Stress ===
All long vowels in a word get equal stress. If no long vowels are present, stress falls on the first syllable. Secondary stress falls on short vowels, which are two syllables to the right or to the left of a stressed syllable.

== Grammar ==
=== Pronouns ===
Gawambaraay Dialect

Subject pronouns:
	Singular	Dual	Plural
1st person	ngaya	ngali	ngiyaani
2nd person	ngindu	ngindaali	ngindaay
3rd person	nguru	(nguru)gali	ganu

== Example sentences ==
Below are examples of Gamilaraay text with interlinear gloss:

garriya nhama bundaa-ma-la dhigayaa
don't 3.DEF fall-ma-IMP bird
'Don’t knock that bird down.'

Giir ngaya gimbi-li
true 1sg do-FUT
'I can do it.'

== Influence in English ==
Several loanwords have entered Australian English from Gamilaraay, including:

Common nouns
Anglicised form	Gamilaraay	Meaning
bindi-eye, bindii, bindies	bindayaa	The burrs of several plant species (Emex australis, Tribulus terrestris, and Soliva sessilis) that stick in one's feet
brolga	burralga	A bird species, Grus rubicunda
possibly budgerigar	gidjirrigaa	A bird species, Melopsittacus undulatus
galah	gilaa	A bird species, Eolophus roseicapilla
yarran	yarraan	A species of acacia tree, Acacia homalophylla
Proper nouns
Anglicised form	Gamilaraay	Meaning
Kamilaroi	gamilaraay	The Gamilaraay people or language
Place names
Anglicised form	Gamilaraay	Meaning
Boggabri	bagaaybaraay	having creeks
Boggabilla	bagaaybila	full of creeks
Collarenebri	galariinbaraay	having acacia blossoms

== Bibliography ==
- Austin, Peter (1993). A Reference Dictionary of Gamilaraay, northern New South Wales. La Trobe University.
- Dixon, Robert M. W. (2002). Australian Languages: Their Nature and Development. Cambridge University Press. ISBN 0-521-47378-0. (On Google Books)
- Mathews, R. H. (July–December 1903). "Languages of the Kamilaroi and Other Aboriginal Tribes of New South Wales". The Journal of the Anthropological Institute of Great Britain and Ireland. 33. The Journal of the Anthropological Institute of Great Britain and Ireland, Vol. 33: 259–283. doi:10.2307/2842812. JSTOR 2842812.
- Ridley, William (1856). "On the Kamilaroi Tribe of Australians and Their Dialect". Journal of the Ethnological Society of London. 4. Ethnological Society of London (1848-1856), Vol. 4: 285–293. doi:10.2307/3014109. JSTOR 3014109.
