= Grotto Point Light =

Lighthouse in New South Wales, Australia

Grotto Point Light Port Jackson Entrance Range Front
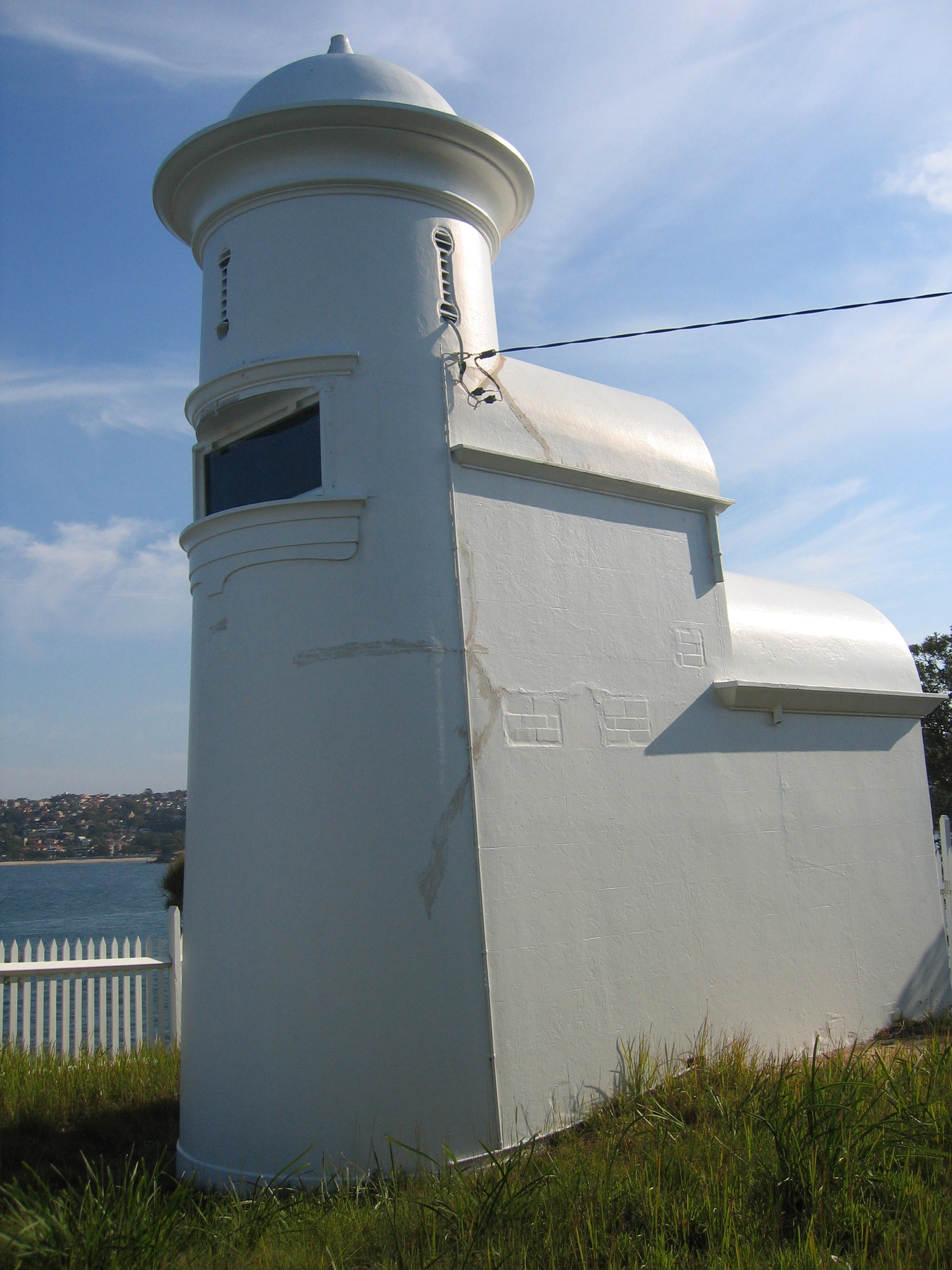
- Grotto Point Light
- Location: Balgowlah Heights; New South Wales; Australia
- Coordinates: 33°49′3.97″S 151°15′41.64″E

Tower
- Constructed: 1910
- Construction: masonry and brick tower
- Height: 26 feet (8 m)
- Shape: cylindrical tower with domed roof
- Markings: white tower
- Operator: Sydney Harbour National Park

Light
- First lit: 1911
- Focal height: 61 feet (19 m)
- Lens: catadioptric lens
- Range: white :12 nautical miles (22 km; 14 mi) red / green: 9 nautical miles (17 km; 10 mi)
- Characteristic: flashing(4) WRG 15s. white on range, red right, green left, obscured other

Grotto Point Light, also known as Port Jackson Entrance Range Front Light, is an active lighthouse located at Grotto Point, a rocky headland at the southernmost tip of Balgowlah Heights, New South Wales, Australia, on the north side of Sydney Harbour. It serves as the front range light, Rosherville Light serving as the rear light, into Port Jackson. Rosherville Light is located approximately 1 mile (1.6 km), 1,690 yards (1,550 m) to be exact, behind Grotto Point Light.

== History ==
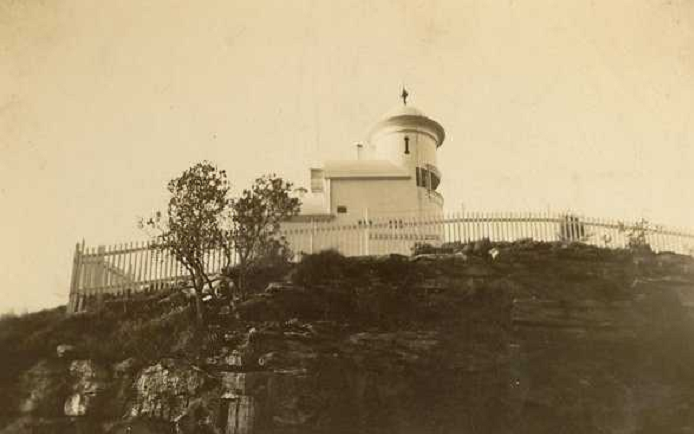
A 1939 view of the lighthouse

The decision to build the range lights was taken in 1909. Construction began in 1910 and the light was first lit on 1 September 1911. It is one of four lighthouses in a style sometimes called "Disney Castle", the others being Rosherville Light, Vaucluse Bay Range Front Light and Vaucluse Bay Range Rear Light.

The original light source was a carbide lamp (acetylene gas) which was initially generated on-site, and later replaced by compressed gas cylinders brought by boat.

Later, the light was electrified and connected to the mains electricity.

== Structure ==
The structure is a masonry and brick domed tower, attached to two barrel-vaulted service sections in decreasing heights, all painted white. The structure is surrounded by a white picket fence. The light is shone through a 2 by 1 metre (6.6 ft × 3.3 ft) horizontal slit, about two-thirds of the way up the tower.

The lens is a catadioptric apparatus.

== Site operation ==
The light is operated by the Sydney Ports corporation while the site is managed by the Department of Environment, Climate Change and Water as part of the Sydney Harbour National Park.

== Visiting ==
The site is accessible by a short hike from Castle Rock track. The grounds are open but the tower is closed to the public.

== See also ==
- List of lighthouses in Australia

== References and notes ==
- List of Lights, Pub. 111: The West Coasts of North and South America (Excluding Continental U.S.A. and Hawaii), Australia, Tasmania, New Zealand, and the Islands of the North and South Pacific Oceans (PDF). List of Lights. United States National Geospatial-Intelligence Agency. 2009. p. 126.
- Rowlett, Russ. "Lighthouses of Australia: Southern New South Wales". The Lighthouse Directory. University of North Carolina at Chapel Hill.
- Searle, Garry. "List of Lighthouses - New South Wales". Lighthouses of Australia. SeaSide Lights.
- "Grotto Point Lighthouse". NSW National Parks and Wildlife Service. Archived from the original on 16 September 2025.
