= Daramulum =

Sky hero associated with Baiame, and an emu-wife

Daramulum engraving in Ku-ring-gai Chase National Park

In Aboriginal cultures of south-east Australia, Daramulum (variations: Darhumulan, Daramulan, Dhurramoolun or Dharramaalan) (“one legged”, from dharra 'leg, thigh' + maal 'one' + -an suffix) (Note: The "dh" is a dental consonant, pronounced like the 'd-th' in English "hid them".) is a sky hero associated with Baiame, and an emu-wife. He is a shapeshifter.

Engravings of Daramulum are sometimes accompanied by indentations that may represent star groups.

Daramulum is depicted on rock art off Elvina Track in Ku-ring-gai Chase National Park, near to a carving of his emu-wife. He is depicted in semi-profile, with one arm, an emu-back (i.e. pointed buttocks), and a large foot.

His voice can be heard through the medium of the bullroarer which is whirled through the air during initiation ceremonies. He now lives in the trees of the bush, particularly in the burls or growths which are found on the trunks of trees, and only leaves them for initiation ceremonies. The bullroarer must be cut from a tree which contains his spirit for it to work.

For the Guringai, Daramulum is represented by the Alpha Crucis of the Southern Cross, with the remainder of the Cross representing the head of his emu wife (of the emu in the sky constellation).

A religion centred on Darhumulan is an identifying feature of the Yuin nation.
