= Gamilaraay =

Aboriginal nation in eastern Australia

Gamilaroi people
- Australian Aboriginal flag

Total population
- approx. 13,000

Languages
- Gamilaroi language, Standard Australian and Aboriginal English

Religion
- Traditional religion

Related ethnic groups
- Indigenous Australians

The Gamilaroi, also known as Gomeroi, Kamilaroi, Kamillaroi, Gomilaroy and other variations, are an Aboriginal Australian people whose lands extend from New South Wales to southern Queensland. They form one of the four largest Indigenous nations in Australia.

== Name ==
The ethnonym Gamilaroi is formed from gamil, meaning "no", and the suffix -(b)araay, bearing the sense of "having". It is a common practice among Australian tribes to have themselves identified according to their respective words for "no".

The Kamilaroi Highway, the Sydney Ferries Limited vehicular ferry "Kamilaroi" (1901–1933), the stage name of Australian rapper and singer the Kid Laroi and a cultivar of durum wheat have all been named after the Kamilaroi people.

== Language ==
Gamilaroi language is classified as one of the Pama–Nyungan languages. The language is no longer spoken, as the last fluent speakers died in the 1950s. However, some parts have been reconstructed by late field work, which includes substantial recordings of the related language, Yuwaalaraay, which continued to be spoken down to the 1980s. Analysing these materials has permitted a good deal of reconstructive work. Robert M. W. Dixon and his student Peter Austin recorded some around Moree, while Corinne Williams wrote a thesis on the Yuwaaliyaay dialect spoken at Walgett and Lightning Ridge.

The Gamilaroi, like many other tribes, taught young men a secret language, called tyake, during their rites of initiation. In these systems, the normal profane terms used in everyday speech had to be substituted with the special mystical vocabulary.

== Country ==
According to Norman Tindale's estimation, the Gamilaroi's tribal domains encompassed some 75,000 km^{2} (29,000 mi^{2}), from around Singleton in the Hunter Valley through to the Warrumbungle Mountains in the west and up through the present-day centres of Quirindi, Gunnedah, Tamworth, Narrabri, Wee Waa, Walgett, Moree, Collarenebri, Lightning Ridge and Mungindi in New South Wales, to Nindigully in south west Queensland.

== History ==
The Gamilaroi were hunter-gatherers with a band-level social organisation. Important vegetable foods were yams and other roots, as well as a sterculia grain, which was made into a bread. Insect larvae, frogs, and eggs of several different animals were also gathered. Various birds, kangaroos, emus, possums, echidnas, and bandicoots were among the important animals hunted. Fish were also consumed, as were crayfish, mussels, and shrimp. Men typically hunted, cleaned, and prepared the game for cooking. Women did the actual cooking, in addition to fishing and farming. Individual Kamilaroi did not eat animals that were their totems.

The nation was made up of many smaller family groups who had their own parcels of land to sustain them. One of the great Kings of this tribe was "Red Chief", who is buried near Gunnedah. The Gamilaroi were regarded as fierce warriors and there is ample evidence of intertribal warfare. The Northern Gamilaroi people have a strong cultural connection with the Bigambul people, and the tribes met regularly for joint ceremonies at Boobera Lagoon near the present-day town of Goondiwindi.

== Dreaming ==
Gamilaroi tradition includes Baiame, the ancestor or patron god. The Baiame story tells how Baiame came down from the sky to the land, and created rivers, mountains, and forests. He then gave the people their laws of life, traditions, songs, and culture. He also created the first initiation site. This is known as a bora; a place where boys were initiated into manhood. When he had finished, he returned to the sky, and people called him the Sky Hero or All Father or Sky Father. He is said to be married to Birrahgnooloo (Birran-gnulu), who is often identified as an emu, and with whom he has a son Turramūlan. In other stories Turramūlan is said to be brother to Baiame. It was forbidden to mention or talk about the name of Baiame publicly. Women were not allowed to see drawings of Baiame nor approach Baiame sites, which are often male initiation sites. Women were instead instructed by Turramūlan's sister, Muni Burribian. In rock paintings Baiame is often depicted as a human figure with a large head-dress or hairstyle, with lines of footsteps nearby. He is always painted in front view; Turramūlan is drawn in profile. Baiame is often shown with internal decorations such as waistbands, vertical lines running down the body, bands and dots.

In Gamilaroi star-lore myth it is recounted that Orion, known as Berriberri (Note: Greenway states that the term means "young men" (Greenway 1878, p. 243).) set out in pursuit of the Pleiades (Miai-miai) and cornered them in a mother-tree where they were transformed into yellow and white cockatoos. His attempts to capture them were blocked by Turramūlan, a one-eyed, one-legged legendary figure associated with the pole star. They called Orion's Belt, ghūtūr, a girdle that covered his invincible boomerang. The seventh of Miai-miai, being less beautiful, was shy and afraid and she was thus transformed into the least visible of the seven Pleiades.

== Rite of initiation ==
The rite of passage whereby Gamilaroi youths are inducted by initiation into full membership of the tribe was conducted at a Bora ceremony on a bora site especially prepared for the occasion. Tribes ready to participate in such rituals were contacted, and the ceremonies lasted several days.

The major bora, called Baiame's ground, was cleared on loamy umah soil, roughly 23 metres (75 ft) in diameter, with the scraped earth used to create an embanked ring about 20–23 centimetres (8–9 in) high to fence off the sacred space, apart from one opening which led into a thunburran or narrows pathway that ran some 250 metres (270 yd) off to a smaller circle, some 14 metres (47 ft) in diameter, called a goonaba, constructed in a similar fashion, Inside this ring two stumps (warrengahlee) formed from uprooted trees, one a coolabah the other a belar, trimmed and turned upside down so that the roots, decorated with twists of bark, flared out.

The pathway leading novices from the larger to the smaller circle was adorned with yammunyamun, figures cut into the exposed sapwood of trees along the route, or drawn on the ground. On the occasion observed by Mathews, on the right hand side, 82 metres (90 yd) down the track, was a mocked up bowerbird's nest, and 2.7 metres (3 yd) further on a scarecrow figure with trousers and jacket stuffed with grass, representing a white man. As the youths passed along this track, the significance of the symbols and their relevance to tribal beliefs was explained. Further down the path, a yammunyamun image of a bullock was formed from bark, dirt and the animal's skull. At 131 metres (143 yd), a 2.7-metre (9 ft) long representation of Baiame and his spouse Gooberangal lay, moulded from the earth, respectively on the right and left of the track. Further on, still on the left, was a carved figure of the Emu, (Note: According to a recent study of Kamilaroi cosmological lore, for them "the appearance of the Emu began at the Coalsack under the star α Crucis, which formed the Emu's head, then β and α Centauri, which form the start of the neck, down the dust lanes of the Milky Way to η Lupus and γ2 Norma, at which point the dust lanes expand with the body of the Emu, reaching the maximum thickness with ε Scorpii and λ Scorpii, and tapering towards 36-Ophiuchi and 3-Sagittarii, eventually ending near μ Sagittarii." (Fuller et al. 2014, pp. 174–175)) apparently crouching, its head pointed towards the large bora. To its right, a further 2.7 metres (3 yd) on, was Goomee, Baiame's fire, a 30-centimetre (1 ft) high mound with a lit fire on top. A further 16 metres (18 yd) on, parallel to the track and on Goomee's side, a codfish was depicted, and after it the Currea, a serpentine creature, and, 14 metres (15 yd) on the other side of the path, two death adders, followed then by a turkey's nest, an earth-stuffed porcupine's skin, and a kangaroo rat's nest. At last, there was a carving of a full tribal man on one side of the track, and an aboriginal woman on the other.

== Sandstone Caves ==
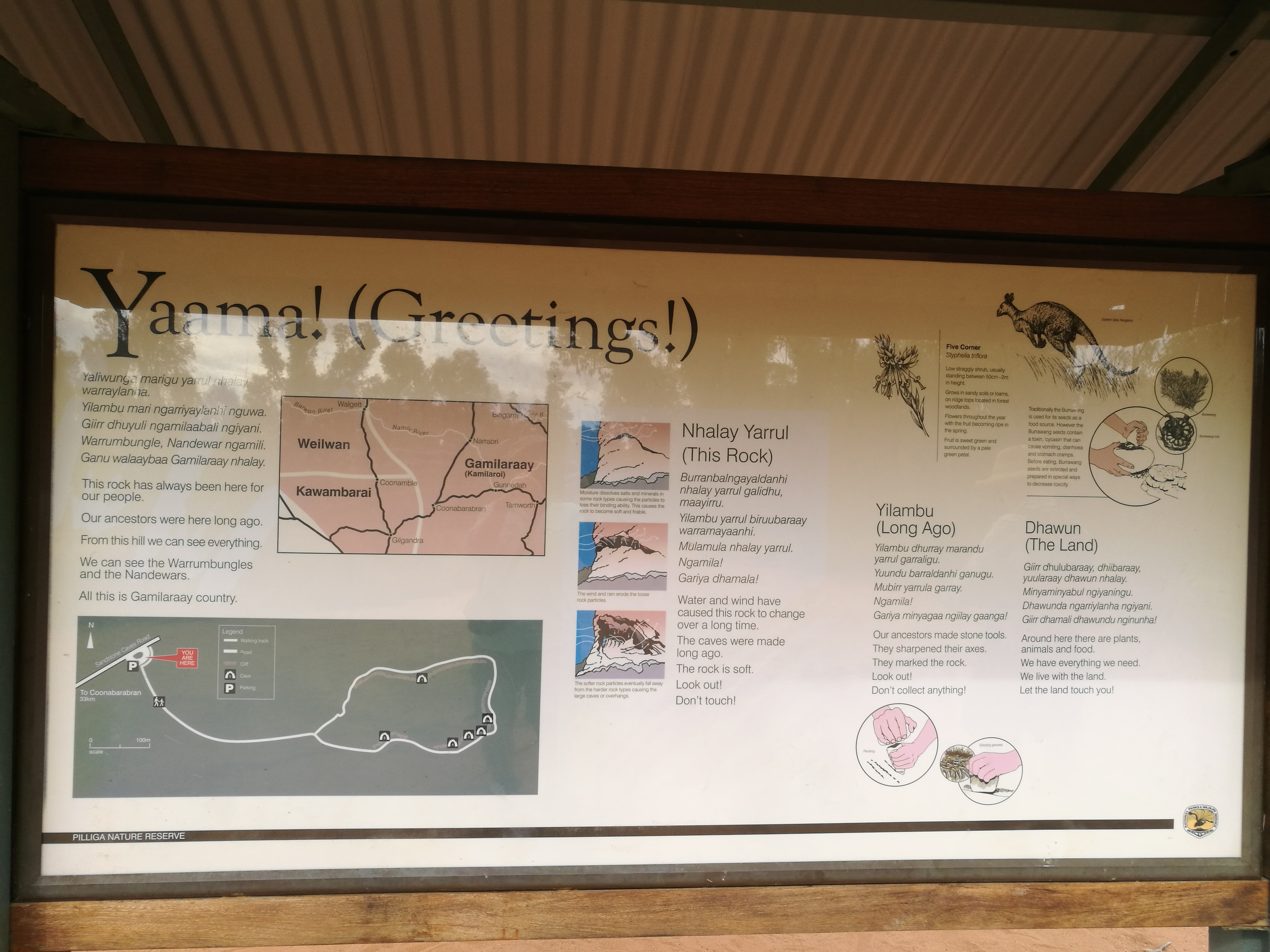
NPWS notice board with Gamilaraay/English texts

The Sandstone Caves (within the Pilliga Nature Reserve) are co-managed by the Gamilaroi people together with NPWS. All interpretive signage is in the Gamilaroi language followed by English. A small example, created by the Coonabarabran Gamilaraay Language Circle (Suellen Tighe, Maureen Sutler, Sid Chatfield & Peter Thompson), is given below. (See adjoining image.)

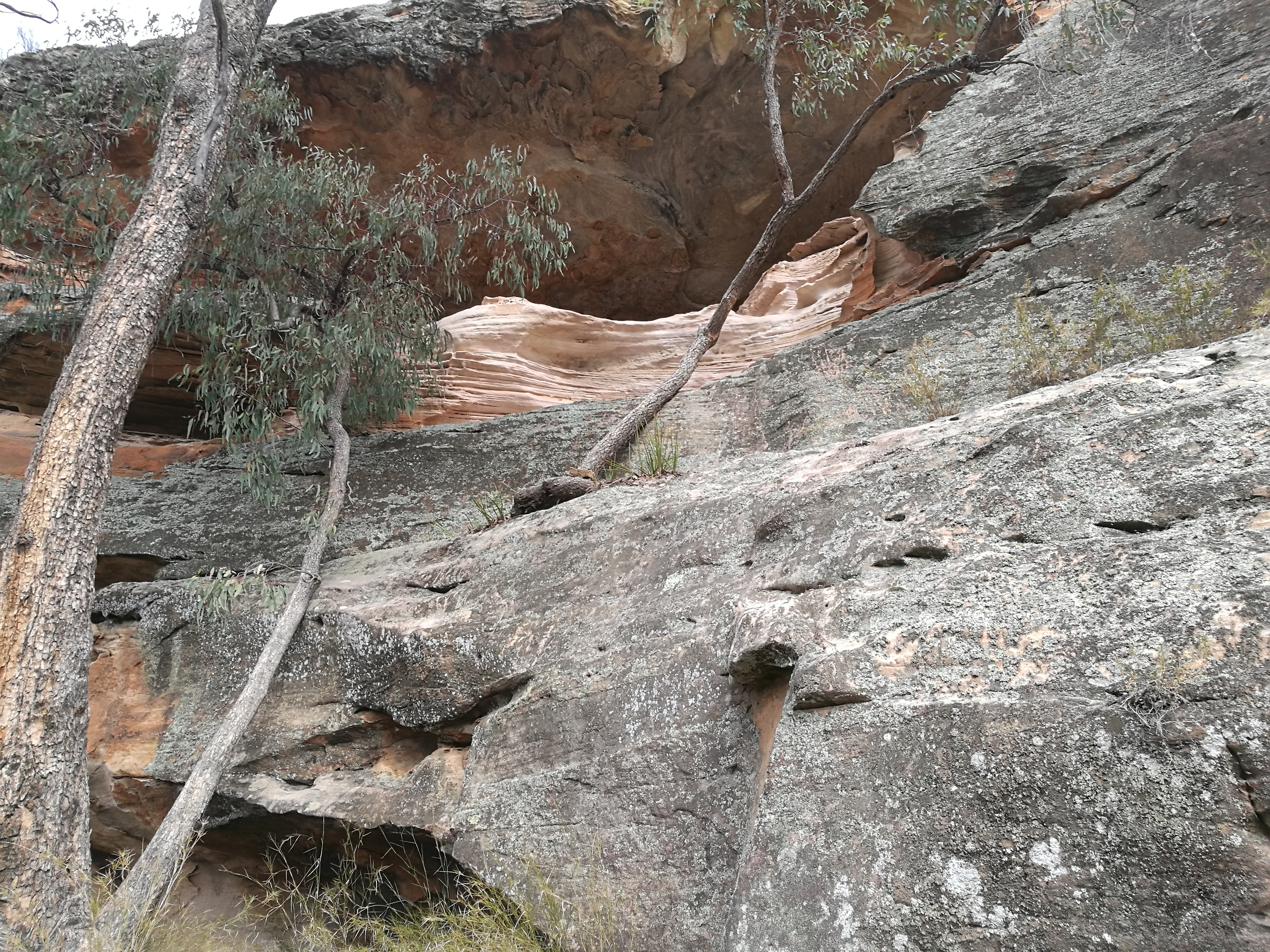
Sandstone Caves, Gamilaraay country, Pilliga NR

Nhalay Yarrul Burranbalngayaldanhi nhalay yarrul ghalidu, maayirru. Yilambu yarrul biruubaraay warramayaanhi. Mulamula, nhalay yarrul! Ngamila!	This rock Water & wind have caused this rock to change over a long time. The caves were made long ago The rock is soft. Look out! Don't touch!	Yilambu Yilambu dhurray marandu yarrul barraldanhi ganugu. Mubirr yarrula garray. Ngamila! Garriya minyagaa ngiilay gaanga!	Long Ago Our ancestors made stone tools. They sharpened their axes. They marked the rock. Look out! Don't collect anything!	Dhawun Giirr dhulubaraay dhibaraay, yuularaay dhawun nhalay. Minya minyabul ngarriylanha ngiyani. Giirr dhamali dhawundu nginunha!	The land Around here there are plants, animals and food. We have everything we need. We live with the land. Let the land touch you!

== Alternative spellings ==
- Cammealroy
- Comleroy
- Cumilri, Camelleri, Cummilroy, Comleroy, Cummeroy
- Duhai
- Gamilaroi, Gamilroi
- Ghummilarai, Cammealroy, Kahmilari
- Gomeroi
- Goomeroi, Gamilaraay, Gamillaraay
- Gumilroi, Gummilroi, Gummilray, Ghummilarai
- Gunnilaroi
- Kahmilaharoy, Kamilary
- Kamilarai, Kamilari, Kamilaroi, Kamilarai, Kamularoi, Kaamee'larrai, Kamileroi
- Kimilari, Karmil, Kamil, Kahml
- Komeroi
- Koomilroi, Komleroy
- Tjake, Tyake
- Yauan

Source: Tindale 1974, p. 194

== Wordlist ==
- bundar (kangaroo)
- buruma (dog) (Note: In ritual speech these terms were substituted respectively with the corresponding sacred words, ungogirgal, and gungumoal, for example (Mathews 1902, p. 159).)

== Notable Gamilaroi people ==
- Gambu Ganuurru
- Mary Jane Cain
- Richard Bell – contemporary artist and co-founder artist collective PROPPA NOW
- Greg Bird – NRL player for Gold Coast Titans
- Brooke Boney – journalist and presenter
- Jaime Chapman – NRLW player for Gold Coast Titans
- Bevan French – Rugby League player for the Parramatta Eels and Wigan Warriors
- Adam Giles – former politician and former Chief Minister of the Northern Territory
- Jason Gillespie – Australian Test cricketer
- Cameron Hammond – professional boxer
- Donna Hartz – midwife and academic
- Toni Hay – Queensland Women in STEM winner 2020 , author Culture of Inclusion: Indigenous Climate Adaptation
- Damien Hooper – professional boxer
- Ben Jones – NRL player for Sydney Roosters in 2013 via their reserve grade team Newtown Jets
- The Kid Laroi – rapper, singer and songwriter whose stage name is derived from Kamilaroi
- Shaleise Law – Australian rules footballer
- Mundara Koorang – artist, designer, teacher, elder, actor and author
- Michael Lett – NRL player
- Roger Knox – country music singer also known as the Black Elvis and the Koori King of Country
- Nakkiah Lui – writer, actor, director
- Ray Martin – TV presenter
- Tracey Moffatt – contemporary artist
- Lyall Munro Jnr (born 1951) – activist and elder
- Lyall Munro Snr (1931–2020) – activist and elder
- Natalie Plane – Australian rules footballer
- Thelma Plum – folk singer/songwriter
- George Rose – NRL player for Manly Sea Eagles
- Dale Shearer – former NRL player for Manly-Warringah and other
- Mitch Tambo – electronic/pop/hip-hop singer and songwriter
- Nathan Thomas – waterpolo player who competed in two Olympic games
- Tarryn Thomas – AFL player for the North Melbourne Kangaroos
- Brad Tighe – NRL player for Penrith Panthers
- Corey Tutt – Young Australian of the year NSW 2020, DeadlyScience founder
- Luke Walsh – NRL player for Penrith Panthers
- Len Waters – first and only Aboriginal fighter pilot in World War 2
- Jonathan Wright – NRL player for Cronulla Sutherland Sharks
- Connor Watson – Australian NRL player for Newcastle Knights
- Thomas Weatherall – writer and actor in the Netflix show Heartbreak High
- Kurtley Beale – Waratahs & Wallabies player
- Geoff Bugden – former NRL player for Parramatta Eels and NSW blues, and Rothmans Medal recipient
- Kobie Dee – singer, songwriter and rapper

== See also ==
- Gamilaroi Nature Reserve
- Gurre kamilaroi

== Sources ==
- "The Balnaves Award Winner". Belvoir. 31 May 2017.
- "Bellata Gold". Archived from the original on 22 March 2006.
- Chrysanthos, Natassia (17 January 2019). "Brooke Boney on being commercial breakfast TV's first indigenous star". The Sydney Morning Herald.
- Dixon, R. M. W. (2002). Australian Languages: Their Nature and Development. Cambridge University Press. ISBN 978-0-521-47378-1.
- Dixon, R. M. W. (2011). Searching for Aboriginal Languages: Memoirs of a Field Worker. Cambridge University Press. ISBN 978-1-108-02504-1.
- Duncan, Alan T. (1996). "Groves, Herbert Stanley (Bert) (1907–1970)". Australian dictionary of Biography. Vol. 14. M.U.P.
- Fison, Lorimer; Howitt, Alfred William (1880). Kamilaroi and Kurnai (PDF). Melbourne: G Robinson – via Internet Archive.
- Fryer, Brooke (21 December 2018). "Brooke Boney set to be one of the few young Indigenous women on commercial television". NITV, Special Broadcasting Service.
- Fuller, Robert S.; Anderson, Michael G.; Norris, Ray P.; Trudgett, Michelle (2014). "The Emu Sky Knowledge of the Kamilaroi and Euahlayi Peoples". Journal of Astronomical History and Heritage. 17 (2): 171–179. arXiv:1403.0304. Bibcode:2014JAHH...17..171F. doi:10.3724/SP.J.1440-2807.2014.02.04.
- Galvin, Nick (7 November 2014). "In First Contact, Ray Martin explores his Aboriginal ancestry and passion for photography". The Sydney Morning Herald. Archived from the original on 2 October 2016.
- Gammage, Bill (2011). The Biggest Estate on Earth: How Aborigines made Australia. Allen & Unwin. pp. 281–304. ISBN 978-1-74237-748-3.
- Giacon, John (October 2014). A grammar of Yuwaalaraay and Gamilaraay: a description of two New South Wales languages based on 160 years of records (PhD thesis). Australian National University.
- Greenway, C. C. (22 November 1901b). "Berryberry, aboriginal myth". Science of Man. 4 (10): 168.
- Greenway, Charles C. (1878). "Kamilaroi language and Traditions". The Journal of the Anthropological Institute of Great Britain and Ireland. 7: 232–274. doi:10.2307/2841001. JSTOR 2841001.
- Greenway, Charles C. (21 August 1901a). "Borah, "boohra," or "boorhung."". Science of Man. 4 (7): 117–118.
- Hewitt, James Francis Katherinus (1901). History and chronology of the myth-making age (PDF). J. Parker and Co. – via Internet Archive.
- Howitt, Alfred William (1904). The native tribes of south-east Australia (PDF). Macmillan.
- Martin, Ray (16 August 2010). "Interview with Ray Martin [transcript]". Talking Heads (Interview). Interviewed by Peter Thompson. ABC TV. Archived from the original on 11 January 2016.
- Mathews, R. H. (1897). "The Bora of the Kamilaroi Tribes". Proceedings of the Royal Society of Victoria. 9: 137–173 – via BHL.
- Mathews, R. H. (1902). "Languages of some native tribes of Queensland, New South Wales, and Victoria". Proceedings of the Royal Society of New South Wales. 36: 135–190, 154–159. doi:10.5962/p.359384.
- McCarthy, Frederick D. (1 June 1940). "The Carved Trees of New South Wales" (PDF). Australian Museum Magazine. pp. 161–166.
- "More Indigenous midwives equals strong cultural connection for mothers and babies: expert". SBS News. Special Broadcasting Service. 11 July 2017.
- "Pilliga Nature Reserve: Plan of Management". Office of Environment and Heritage.
- Purcell, Leigh (2011). Cumming, Helen (ed.). Carved Trees: Aboriginal cultures of western NSW, Gamilaroi Country (PDF). State Library of New South Wales. ISBN 978-0-7313-7206-5.
- "Samuels, Charles (1864–1912)". Charles Samuels (1864-1912). National Centre of Biography, Australian National University.
- Smith, Hilary (2018). "Kamilaroi, Gamilaraay, or Gomeroi?". Winanga-li.
- Tindale, Norman Barnett (1974). Aboriginal Tribes of Australia: Their Terrain, Environmental Controls, Distribution, Limits, and Proper Names. Australian National University Press. ISBN 978-0-708-10741-6.
