= Sky deity =

Deity associated with the sky

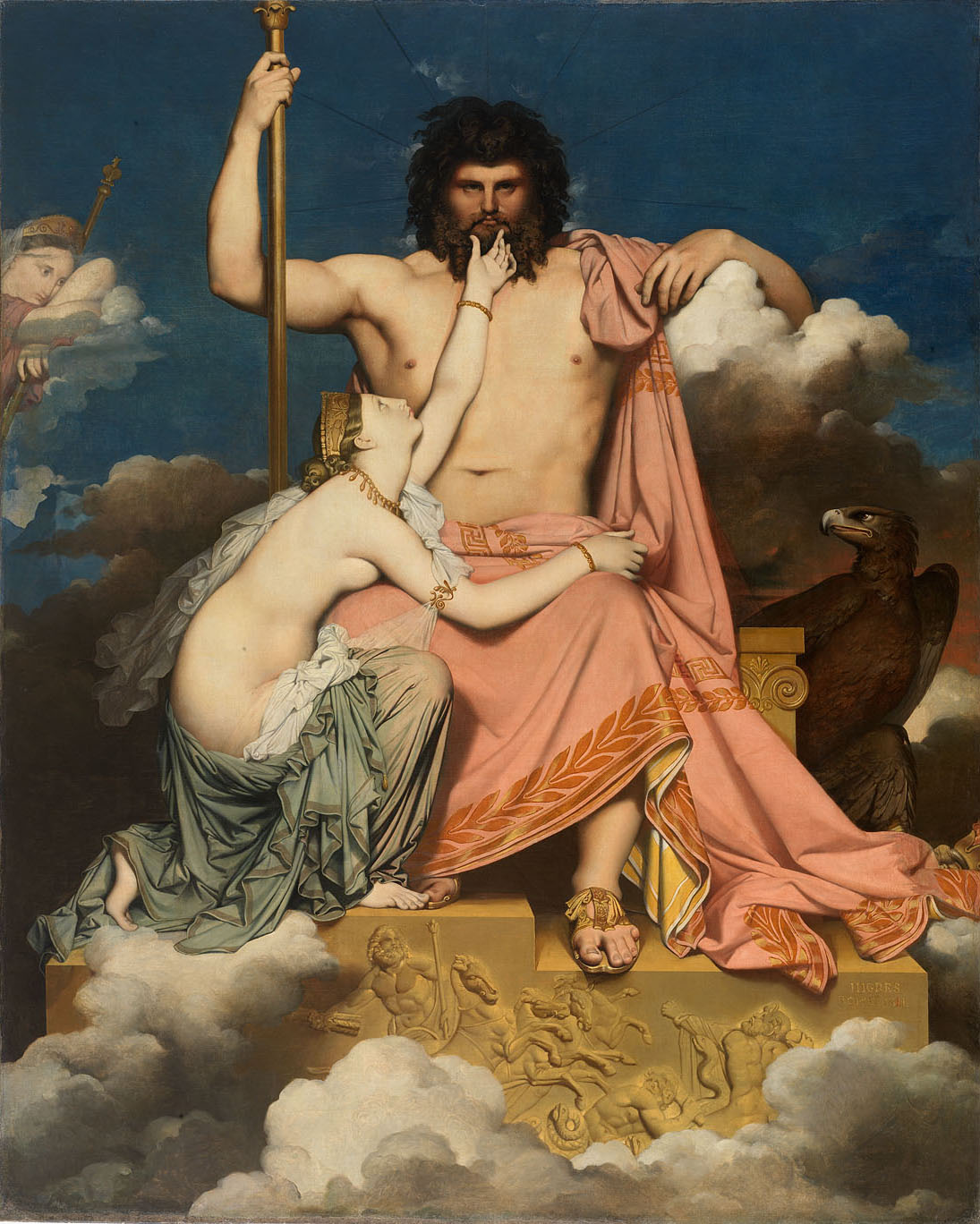
Jupiter, the sky father of Roman religion and mythology

A sky deity is a deity associated with the sky, and are a common feature of polytheistic religions, and as hypothesized by Wilhelm Schmidt potentially early forms of monotheism. The sky often has great religious significance.

The daytime sky deities are typically distinct from the nighttime ones. Stith Thompson's Motif-Index of Folk-Literature reflects this by separating the category of "Sky-god" (A210) from that of "Star-god" (A250). In mythology, nighttime gods are usually known as night deities and gods of stars simply as star gods. Both of these categories are included here since they relate to the sky. Luminary deities are included as well since the sun and moon are located in the sky. Some religions may also have a deity or personification of the day, distinct from the god of the daylit sky, to complement the deity or personification of the night.

Daytime gods and nighttime gods are frequently deities of an "upper world" or "celestial world" opposed to the earth and a "netherworld" (gods of the underworld are sometimes called "chthonic" deities). Within Greek mythology, Uranus was the primordial sky god; he was ultimately succeeded by Zeus, who ruled the celestial realm atop Mount Olympus. In contrast to the celestial Olympians, the chthonic deity Hades ruled the underworld, and Poseidon ruled the sea.

A masculine sky god is often also king of the gods, taking the position of patriarch within a pantheon. Such king gods are collectively categorized as "sky father" deities, with a polarity between sky and earth often being expressed by pairing a "sky father" god with an "earth mother" goddess (pairings of a sky mother with an earth father are less frequent). A main sky goddess is often the queen of the gods and may be an air/sky goddess in her own right, though she usually has other functions as well with "sky" not being her main one. In antiquity, several sky goddesses in ancient Egypt, Mesopotamia, and the Near East were called Queen of Heaven.

Gods may rule the sky as a pair (for example, the ancient Semitic supreme god El and the fertility goddess Asherah, with whom he was most likely paired). The following is a list of sky deities in various polytheistic traditions arranged mostly by language family, which is typically a better indicator of relatedness than geography.

== African ==
=== Central African ===
- Khonvoum, Mbuti supreme creator god and sky father
- Nzambi Ampungu, Bakongo creator, sky and sun god
- Nzambici, Bakongo sky, moon and earth goddess

=== East African ===
- Mulungu, Nyamwezi creator and sky god
- Waaq creator and sky god

=== North African ===
- Amun, Ancient Egyptian god of creation and the wind
- Anhur, Ancient Egyptian originally a foreign war god
- Denka, Dinka god of sky, rain and fertility
- Hathor, Ancient Egyptian originally a sky goddess
- Horus, Ancient Egyptian god of the sun, sky, kings, and war
- Khonsu, Ancient Egyptian moon god
- Mehet-Weret, Ancient Egyptian goddess of the sky
- Nut, Ancient Egyptian goddess of the sky
- Ra, Ancient Egyptian god of the sun that ruled the sky, earth and underworld
- Shu, Ancient Egyptian god of the air
- Thoth, Ancient Egyptian original moon god

=== Southern African ===
- Modimo, Ramasedi sky god
- Umvelinqangi, Zulu sky god
- Utixo, Khoikhoi sky god
- Xamaba, Heikum creator and sky god

=== West African ===
- Nyame, Akan supreme deity, god of the sky
- Olorun, Yoruba supreme deity, God of the sky and heaven
- Shango, Yoruba sky father and thunder god
- Amadioha, Igbo thunder and lightning god
- Osalobua, Benin supreme creator god and sky father
- Wulbari, Guang sky god
- Abasi Ibom Enyon, Ibibio People God, or the one who is forever; compound word, Kingdom of High
- Achamán, Guanche creator and sky god

== Asian ==
=== Central Asian ===
==== Turkic and Mongolic ====
- Tengri, god of the sky
- Ülgen
- Kayra

==== Hindu ====
- Aditi, celestial mother of the gods
- Chandra, god of the moon
- Dyaus Pita, sky father
- Indra, king of the gods, associated with weather
- Ratri, goddess of night
- Saranyu, goddess of clouds
- Surya, god of the sun
- Ushas, goddess of dawn
- Varuna, a sky god

=== Eastern Asian ===
==== Chinese ====
- Yu Huang Dadi-Jade Emperor (center)
- Ziwei Dadi-polestar emperor (north)
- Changsheng Dadi-longevity emperor (south)
- Qinghua Dadi-azure-illustrious emperor (east)
- Taiji Tianhuang Dadi-ultimate heaven emperor (west)
- Chang'e, moon goddess who lives with the moon rabbit
- Shang Di, the celestial emperor
- Tian or Heaven
- Xihe (deity), sun goddess
- Zhinü, weaver of the clouds
- Xian, Taoist spirits associated with the sky and tian

==== Japanese ====
- Amaterasu, goddess of the sun and the universe, ancestor of the emperors of Japan, and the most important deity in Shintoism.
- Amenominakanushi, heavenly ancestral god.
- Izanagi, creator of Japan and sky father.
- Izanami, creator goddess of Japan with her husband; starts off as a sky goddess, but after she dies becomes a death/underworld/chthonic goddess.
- Marici, Buddhist goddess of the heavens.
- Tsukuyomi, god of the moon and brother of Amaterasu.

==== Korean ====
- Hwanin, sky god.
- Hwanung, son of Hwanin.

==== Thai ====
- Phaya Thaen (Thai: พญาแถน), the king of heaven, the protagonist in a Rocket Festival

==== Vietnamese ====
- Ông Trời, sky god in Vietnamese indigenous religion
- Ông Tử Vi, king of the stars
- Mẫu Cửu Trùng Thiên, she is the daughter of Ông Trời, the sister of the Mẫu Thượng Thiên, Mặt Trời, Mặt Trăng and also a goddess who rules the sky
- Mẫu Thượng Thiên, she is the daughter of Ông Trời and also one of the rulers of the sky
- Pháp Vân, cloud goddess
- Thần Mặt Trời, goddess of the sun, daughter of Ông Trời
- Thần Mặt Trăng, goddess of the moon, daughter of Ông Trời
- Hằng Nga, the goddess who lives on the moon with uncle Cuội and Moon Rabbit

=== Western Asian ===
- Asherah, sky goddess and consort of El; after the rise of Yahweh, she may have become Yahweh's consort before she was demonized and the Israelite religion became monotheistic
- Baalshamin, "Lord of the Heavens" (cf. Armenian Barsamin)
- El (god), original sky god and sky father of the Semitic speakers (replaced by Yahweh among Israelites)
- Yahweh, according to some scholars like Mircea Eliade

==== Iranian ====
- Asmān, god of sky
- Māh, god of the moon
- Ohrmazd, sky father, the Great God
- Tīštar, god of Sirius star and Rainfall
- Xwarxšēd, god of the sun

== The Americas ==
=== Haitian ===
- Badessy, Vodou loa associated with the sky.

=== Incan ===
- Chaska Coyllur, goddess of beauty, flowers and young maidens. Personification of planet Venus.
- Chuqui Chinchay, incarnation of various stars and meteorological phenomena.
- Coyllur, goddess of all the stars.
- Illapa, god of the sky, atmospheric phenomena and war.
- Inti, god of the Sun.
- Kon, god of the wind and rain.
- Kuychi, god of rainbows.
- Pachakamaq, creator and sustainer god of all the universe.
- Mama Killa, goddess of the Moon.
- Viracocha, heavenly father and god creator of all that exists.

=== Inuit ===
- Anguta, sky father and psychopomp.
- Ataksak, goddess of the sky.
- Negafook, god of weather systems.
- Torngarsuk, god of the sky.

=== Iroquoian ===
- Atahensic, Iroquois sky goddess who fell to Earth at the time of creation.

=== Lakota ===
- Anpao wichapi, the Morning Star spirit, bringer of knowledge and new beginnings
- Han, the spirit of night, representative of ignorance
- Wanbli Gleska, the Spotted Eagle spirit, usually regarded as Wakan Thanka
- Hanwi, the moon spirit of knowledge, feminine power, sometimes considered to be the wife of Wi
- Mahpiya Oyate, the Cloud People, also known as the Wichapi Oyate (Star People)
- Wohpe, the spirit of meteors or falling stars (often confused with Fallen Star), also the spirit of beauty, love, wishes, dreams, and prophecy
- Wakinyan, thunder spirit usually taking the form of a bird
- Wi, the sun spirit responsible for bringing light and wisdom to the Lakota oyate
- Wichapi oyate, the Star People, each having respective powers however they usually represent knowledge to some degree
- Wichapi Hinhpaya, the Fallen Star, the son of Wichapi owáŋžila and Tapun Sa Win
- Wichapi owáŋžila, the Resting Star or Polaris, the widower of Tapun Sa Win (Red Cheeked Woman)

=== Lencans ===
- Itanipuca, sky father and god of celestial bodies
- Icelca, god of time and seasons

=== Mayan ===
- Cabaguil, god of the sky.
- Hunab Ku, sky father.
- Tzacol, sky god and creator deity.

=== Puebloans ===
- Ápoyan Ta'chu, sky father in Zuni mythology

=== Taíno mythology ===
- Yaya, supreme god in Taíno mythology

=== Uto-Aztecan ===
- Citlalincue, goddess of the Milky Way
- Cipactonal, god of the daytime
- Oxomoco, goddess of nighttime
- Centzonmimixcoa, 400 gods of the northern stars
- Centzonhuitznahua, 400 gods of the southern stars
- Coyolxauhqui, goddess of the Moon
- Meztli, goddess of the Moon
- Tonatiuh, god of the Sun
- Tianquiztli, star goddesses (see the Pleiades)
- Citlaltonac, god of male stars
- Citlalmina, goddess of female stars
- Citlaxonecuilli, goddess of Ursa Major
- Eototo, Hopi head kachina and sky father

== Australian ==
- Altjira, Arrernte creator and sky god.
- Baiame, southeast Australian creator and sky god.
- Bila (sun), cannibalistic sun goddess.
- Binbeal, god of rainbows.
- Bunjil, Kulin creator and sky god.
- Daramulum, one-legged emu sky god.
- Numakulla, a pair of creator and sky gods.
- Rainbow Serpent, creator god in many Aboriginal cultures associated with water, rain, and rainbows, though it also has a chthonic connection.

== Burmese ==
- Akathaso, the spirits of the sky

== Etruscan ==
- Ani, primordial god of the sky identified with the Greek Uranus and Roman Caelus
- Tinia, god of the sky

== European ==
=== Albanian ===
- Zojz, the sky-god
- Dielli, the Sun
- Hëna, the Moon
- Prende, Afër-dita, the dawn, Venus

=== Baltic ===
- Auštaras, the god of the northeast wind
- Dievs, the god of the day-lit sky and the chief god in Latvian mythology
- Vejopatis, the god of the wind who guards the divine realm of Dausos

=== Celtic ===
- Latobius, sky and mountain god equated with the Greek gods Zeus and Ares
- Nuada, god of the sky, wind, and war
- Sulis, goddess of the hot springs at Bath; probably originally the pan-Celtic sun goddess
- Ambisagrus, Cisalpine god of rain, sky and hail equated to the Roman god Jupiter
- Tuireann, Irish god of thunder and the sky, Gaulish name Taranis.

=== English ===
- Nuit, goddess of "Infinite Space and Infinite Stars" in Thelema

=== Germanic ===
- Dagr, personification of day
- Eostre, spring and fertility goddess; originally the Germanic dawn goddess
- Mēnô, the moon
- Nótt, personification of night
- Sōwilō, the sun
- Teiwaz, early Germanic sky god, also the god of law, justice, and the thing (assembly)
- Thor, God of Sky, Strength and thunder, champion of the deities. Equated with Jupiter

=== Greek ===
- Aether, primeval god of the upper air
- Apollo, god of light, archery, prophecy, medicine, plagues...
- Artemis, goddess of the moon, hunt, virginity, childbirth...
- Astraeus, dusk god
- Eos, dawn goddess
- Helios, personification/titan of the sun
- Hemera, primordial goddess of day
- Hera, goddess of the air, marriage, women, women's fertility, childbirth, heirs, kings, and empires
- Iris, goddess of the rainbow and messenger of Hera
- Nephele, cloud nymph in Hera's likeness
- Nyx, primordial goddess of night
- Selene, personification/titan of the moon
- Uranus, primeval god of the sky
- Zeus, king of the gods, ruler of Mount Olympus, god of the sky, thunder, weather, law, order, and civilization

=== Messapian ===
- Zis, god of the sky

=== Proto-Indo-European ===
- Dyeus, the chief sky father of the Proto-Indo-European religion
- Hausos, dawn goddess and daughter of Dyeus
- Menot, moon deity
- Sehul, sun deity

=== Roman ===
- Aurora, dawn goddess
- Caelus, personification of the sky, equivalent to the Greek Uranus
- Juno, goddess of the sky, queen of the gods, and Jupiter's wife, equivalent to the Greek Hera
- Jupiter, king of heaven and god of the sky and weather, equivalent to the Greek Zeus
- Luna, moon goddess
- Nox, Roman version of Nyx, night goddess and mother of Discordia
- Sol, sun god
- Summanus, god of nocturnal thunder/lightning

=== Slavic ===
- Dazhbog (or Svarog), god of the Sun
- Khors, god of the Moon
- Stribog, god of the winds, sky, and air
- Perun, god of the thunderstorms, lightning and sky.
- Triglav, a triple god whose three heads represent sky, earth, and underworld
- Zorya, goddess of dawn

=== Thracian and Phrygian ===
- Sabazios, sky father

== Filipino ==
- llanit: a group of Isnag sky dwellers who are helpful harvest spirits
- Kaptan, a sky god
- Bathala, the creator of the sky

== Hurrian ==
- Hepit, goddess of the sky
- Teshub, god of the sky and storms

== Meitei/Sanamahism ==
- Apaknga (Lunar mansions)
- Chingcharoibi (G Geminorum)
- Chungshennubi (Cancer)
- Khongjom Nubi (Pleiades)
- Konthoujam Tampha Lairembi, queen of heaven
- Korouhanba, sky and sun god
- Likla Saphaba (Orion)
- Nongshaba, celestial dragon lion
- Nongthang Leima, thunder and lightning goddess
- Pakhangba, celestial dragon god
- Sachung Telheiba (A Orionis)
- Sajik (Arietis)
- Salailen (Soraren), father sky who help humans to build a civilisation
- Sidaba Mapu, the sky god and the Supreme Deity
- Taoroinai, heavenly dragon god
- Thaba (Musca)
- Thangching, ancestral God descended from the heaven

== Malagasy ==
- Zanahary, sky deity of Madagascar

== Māori ==
- Ao, god of light and the sky
- Ranginui, sky father
- Tāwhaki Being of thunder and lightning
- Tāwhirimātea God of weather, storms, thunder and lightning
- Tane-rore, personification of shimmering air
- Te Uira Personification of lightning
- Whaitiri Female Personification of Thunder
- Uenuku, god of rainbows

== Other Pacific Islanders ==
- Abeguwo, Melanesian sky goddess
- Amai-te-rangi, sky demon of Mangaia
- Atua I Kafika, supreme sky god of Polynesia
- Ira, Polynesian sky goddess
- Laufakana'a, Tongan creator god and sky father
- Tangaloa, Tongan sky god

== Sumerian ==
- Anshar, god of the sky
- Anu, king of the gods, associated with the sky, heaven, and constellations
- Enlil, god of breath, air, and wind
- Utu, god of the sun

== Uralic ==
=== Finnic ===
- Ilmari, godlike smith-hero and creator of the sky
- Ilmatar, virgin spirit of the air
- Ukko, supreme god of sky, weather, thunder, crops (harvest) and other natural things
- Perkele, associated with Ukko by some researchers. A name for Devil in Finnish.
- Taara, Oeselian chief god of thunder and the sky

=== Mari ===
- Kugu Jumo, chief god of the sky, creator of the world, associated with a duck
- Tõlze, god of the moon
- Piambar, daughter of the sky
- Shudyr-Shamich, god of the stars
- Uzhara, god of the dawn

=== Mordvin ===
- Värde-Škaj, Mokshan supreme god of the sky
- Niškepaz, Erzyan supreme god of the sky
- Kovava, Mokshan goddess of the moon

=== Permic ===
- Inmar, Udmurt god of the heavens
- Jenmar, Komi sky and chief god, creator of the world, associated with the moose

=== Sami ===
- Horagalles, Sami god of the sky, thunder and lightning, the rainbow, weather, oceans, lakes, human life, health and well-being
- Mano, god of the moon

=== Samoyedic ===
- Num, god of the sky

=== Ugric ===
- Num-Toorum-Aś, Ob-Ugric supreme god and ruler of the kingdom of the sky in the north

== See also ==
- List of light deities
- List of lunar deities
- List of night deities
- List of solar deities
- Nature worship
- Sky father
- Water deity
- Wind deity
