= Tikopia =

Island in Solomon Islands

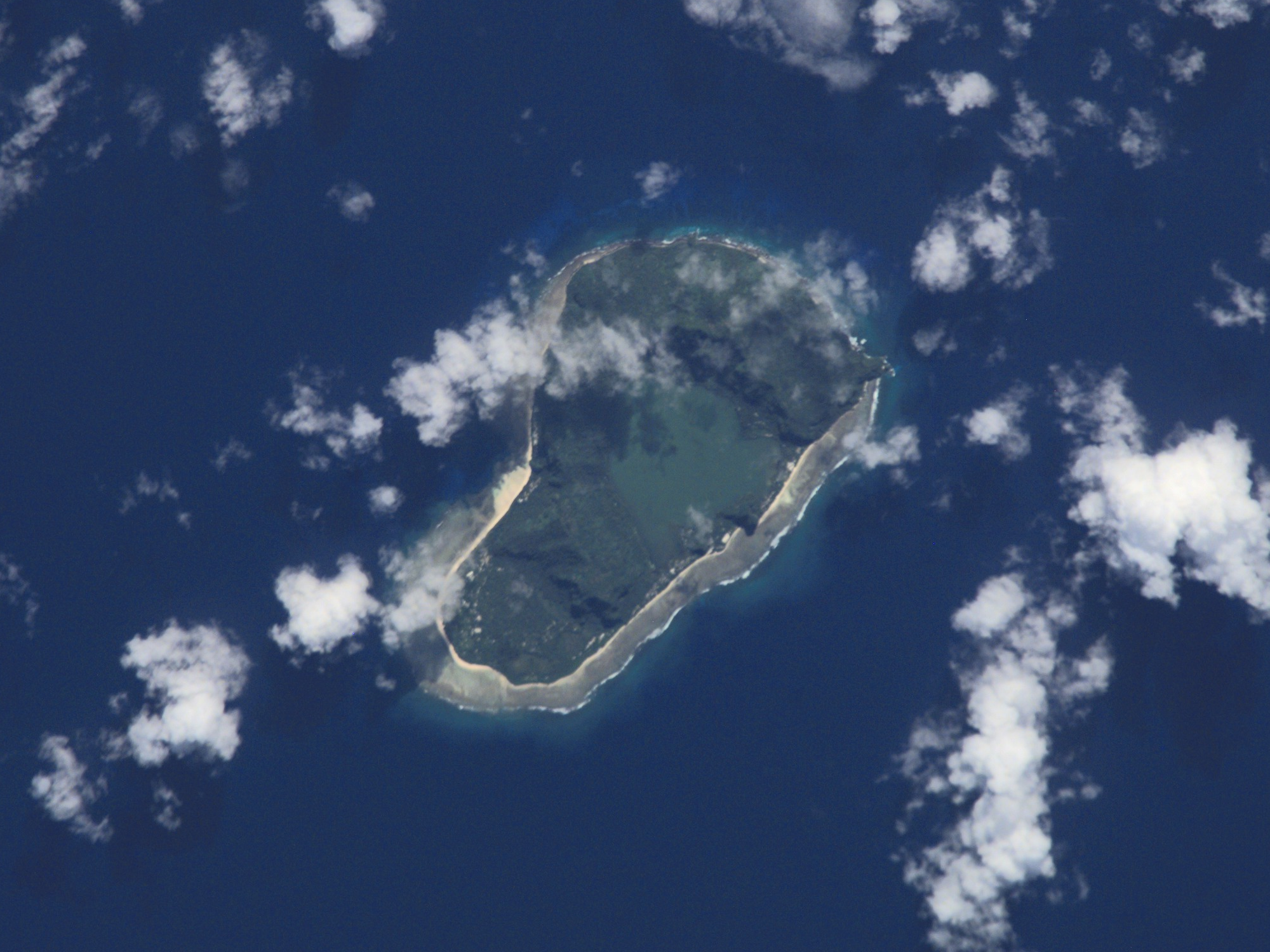
- NASA picture of Tikopia

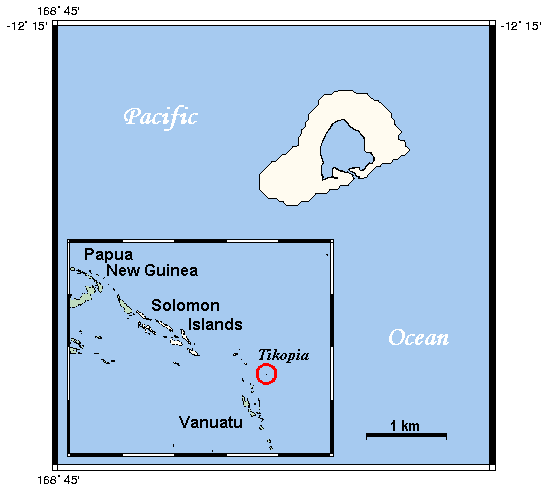
- Tikopia and inset showing position

- Location within Solomon Islands

Geography
- Location: Pacific Ocean
- Coordinates: 12°17′47.3″S 168°49′55.0″E
- Archipelago: Solomon Islands
- Area: 5 km^{2} (1.9 sq mi)
- Highest elevation: 380 m (1250 ft)
- Highest point: Reani

Administration
- Solomon Islands
- Province: Temotu

Demographics
- Ethnic groups: Polynesian

Tikopia is a volcanic island in Temotu Province, in the independent nation of Solomon Islands, southwestern Pacific Ocean. Although most of Solomon Islands is Melanesian, Tikopia is culturally Polynesian. Its remoteness has enabled much of its culture to persist. One overview calls it "arguably the most thoroughly documented small-scale society in the ethnographic record".

Tikopia played a significant role in solving the mystery of the Lapérouse expedition, which had disappeared in 1788. The Calcutta Government Gazette wrote in 1828, "It is a curious fact that the discovery of the wreck of LaPerouse's ships arose out of a massacre at the Fejee Islands, in 1813". Survivors from this massacre were put ashore at the nearest landfall, which turned out to be Tikopia, and thus began a chain of events which resulted in this tiny island becoming a recognised name around the world.

== Location and geography ==
Covering an area of 5 square kilometres (1.9 square miles), this Pacific island is the remnant of an extinct volcano. Its highest point, Mount Reani, reaches an elevation of 380 metres (1,250 feet) above sea level. Lake Te Roto covers an old volcanic crater which is 80 metres (260 feet) deep. This was a fresh water lagoon until a storm in 2002 breached the narrow barrier to the sea.

Tikopia is sometimes grouped with the Santa Cruz Islands. Administratively, Tikopia belongs to Temotu Province (formerly known as Santa Cruz Island Province) as the southernmost of the Solomon Islands. Some discussions of Tikopian society include its nearest neighbour, the even tinier island of Anuta.

It was first listed on British marine charts as Barwell Island. From the 1820s it became known by its endonym, transliterated "Tucopia".

== History as a Polynesian outlier ==
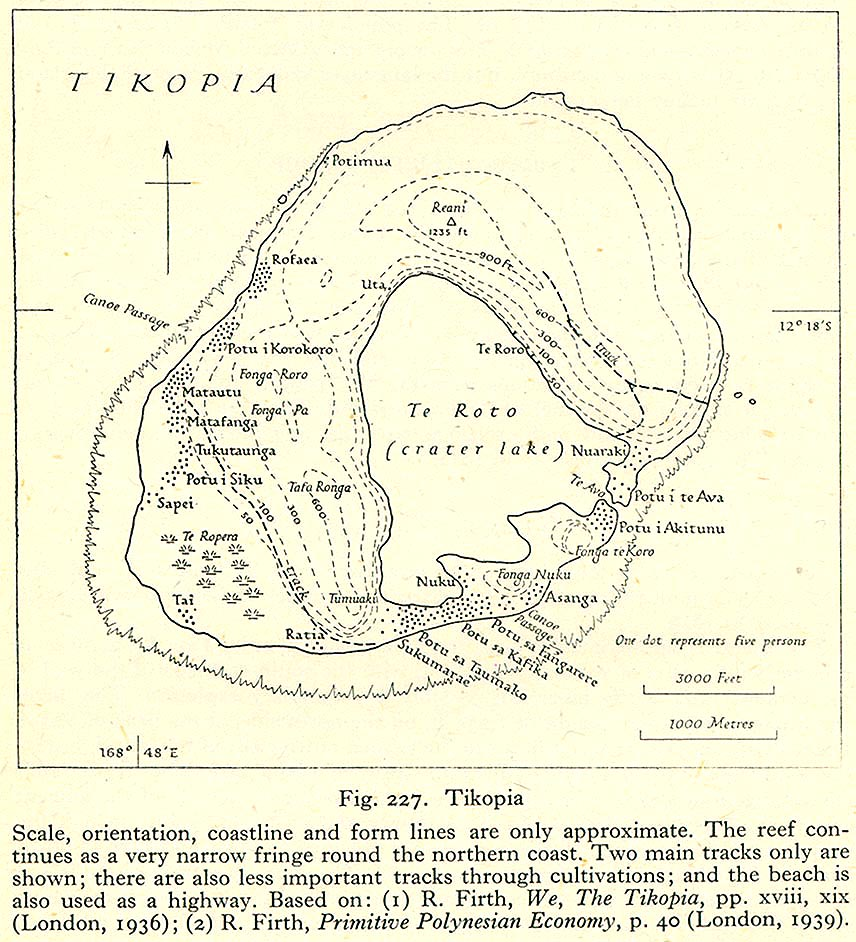
An old map of Tikopia from the 1940s

Tikopia is a Polynesian outlier, meaning that while its inhabitants are culturally Polynesian, the island lies some distance from the Polynesian Triangle, a region of the Pacific bounded by Hawaii, Easter Island (Rapa Nui) and New Zealand (Aotearoa). Their language, Tikopian, is a member of the Samoic branch of the Polynesian languages.

Before European contact, there was frequent canoe voyaging between the islands; Polynesian navigation skills are recognised to have allowed deliberate journeys on double-hull sailing canoes (outrigger boats). The voyagers moved into the Tuvaluan atolls as a stepping stone to migration into Melanesia and Micronesia. The pattern of settlement that is believed to have occurred is that the Polynesians spread out from Tonga and other islands in the central and south eastern Pacific. The time frame of the migration is not precisely identified but is understood to be some point between the 10th century to the mid-13th century. The arrival of the voyagers in Anuta could have occurred later.

== European contact ==
The first Europeans arrived on 22 April 1606 as part of the Spanish expedition of Pedro Fernandes de Queirós.

It is believed that the British merchantman the Barwell passed by in 1798.

The next certain contact with Europeans was 20 September 1813, when the Hunter, a trading vessel out of Calcutta, visited the island. The Hunter had sailed to Fiji to collect sandalwood, and enlisted the help of some Europeans already living there—shipwrecked or discharged sailors—as well as local islanders. After some months, hostilities ensued, in which many Fijians and much of the Hunter's company were killed. The Hunter set sail with various survivors aboard, Captain Robson promising to put three of them (a Prussian named Martin Bushart, his Fijian wife, and a lascar known sometimes as Joe, sometimes as Achowlia) ashore at the nearest landfall. That turned out to be Tikopia, which from a distance they took to be uninhabited:

On approaching the island we found out our mistake, as it was thickly inhabited. Several of the islanders came off in canoes, who, we all conjectured, had never before seen Europeans. They were unarmed, but very wild. They came on deck without reserve, seized upon bars of iron from the forge, and jumped overboard with that metal, as also a frying-pan, the cook's axe, knife, saucepans, &c. The firing of a musket in the air had not the least effect upon them [...]The boat being got out, I embarked in her with Martin Bushart, the lascar, and chief. On reaching the shore the chief landed, and conducted Martin to the king, who was sitting under the shade of some cocoa-nut trees chewing the betel-nut. He made his majesty a few presents, and by signs, words, and gestures, informed him that himself, the Lascar, his wife, and others, were coming to reside on the island. The chief appeared much pleased with this arrangement, and they returned to the boat. On rejoining the ship, Martin and the Lascar put their things into the boat, with Martin's wife.

Thirteen years later, the former third mate of the Hunter was now in command of his own ship, the St Patrick. Peter Dillon re-visited Tikopia in May 1826 to see how his friends were doing. According to the Prussian cast-away, only two ships had visited the island in the intervening years, both whalers: one in 1824 for a full month's whaling, and one in 1825 in passage. Dillon discovered items on Tikopia which he took to be from a European ship; on enqiry, he heard that a pair of ships had been wrecked on a neighbouring—but distant—island named Vanikoro (also transliterated then as Malicolo, Mannicolo, or Vannicolo) "when the old men now in Tucopia were boys". Dillon immediately believed these to be the ships of the French circumnavigation, Boussole and the Astrolabe, missing since 1788. A navigator from Tikopia guided the St Patrick to Vanikoro, which took two days, but owing to unfavourable winds, no one was able to land. The St Patrick proceeded to Calcutta, then the capital of British India, where Dillon persuaded the authorities to commission a ship for him, the Research, to return to Vanikoro (via New Zealand) in the hopes of finally solving the mystery of the La Perouse expedition. On Tikopia Dillon had solicited the assistance of Martin Bushart, giving a pledge to return him to that island; Bushart married again in New Zealand and his wife Tetorey joined the ship for the next leg of the journey.

On 5 September 1827 the Research reached Tikopia. Several Englishmen had taken up residence on the island, claiming to be shipwrecked sailors, although Dillon suspected mutiny or desertion or absconding from penal servitude in Australia. Evidently Tikopian encounters with visiting ships In the intervening 16 months had been less than happy, as islanders kept cautiously to the shore instead of greeting an arrival with a flotilla of welcoming canoes. Most of these visitors would have been whaling ships, which at some point introduced to the island a cat and the mammy apple, which became an important ritual food.

On Tikopia, Captain Dillon engaged an interpreter and pilot named Rathea, who had lived for several years on Vanikoro. He was the person who had brought metal maritime artifacts from Vanikoro to Tikopia, just before Dillon's previous visit. The Research left Tikopia on 6 September, arriving at Vanikoro the next day. Dillon acknowledges that "without him [Rathea] I could not have effected any thing in the way of friendly intercourse with the Mannicolans; as the greater number of them had never seen a European before, and considered myself and the other persons on board wearing hats and clothing, as ghosts, although Rathea laboured to undeceive them in that respect."

== Population, economy, and culture ==
The population of Tikopia is about 1,200, distributed among more than 20 villages mostly along the coast. The largest village is Matautu on the west coast (not to be confused with Mata-Utu, the capital of Wallis and Futuna). Historically, the tiny island has supported a high-density population of a thousand or so. Strict social controls over reproduction prevented further increase.

Tikopians practice an intensive system of agriculture (which has been compared to permaculture), similar in principle to forest gardening and the gardens of the New Guinea Highlands. Their agricultural practices are strongly and consciously tied to the population density. For example, around 1600, the people agreed to slaughter all pigs on the island, and substitute fishing, because the pigs were taking too much food that could be eaten by people. Tikopians have developed rituals and figurative constructions related to their fishing practices.

Unlike the rapidly Westernizing society of much of the rest of Temotu Province, Tikopia society is little changed from ancient times. Its people take great pride in their customs, and see themselves as holding fast to their Polynesian traditions while they regard the Melanesians around them to have lost most of theirs. The island is controlled by four chiefs (ariki): Kafika, Tafua, Taumako and Fangarere, with Kafika recognised as the first among equals.

Tikopians have a highly developed culture with a strong Polynesian influence, including a complex social structure.

Dillon wrote of the islanders:

The Tucopians are an extremely mild and inoffensive race, hospitable and generous, as their reception of Bushart and the lascar sufficiently proves. [...] I was surprised at the number of females on Tucopia, as it was at least treble that of the males. On inquiry, I found that all the male children of each female, except the two first, are strangled the moment after their birth. The reason they assign for this cruel policy is, that if they were allowed to live, the population of their little island would be so dense that its produce could not support them. Tucopia is only seven miles in [circumference] but the soil is very luxuriant; yet there generally is a scarcity of provisions. They live chiefly on vegetable food, having neither hogs nor poultry, which are both plentiful on other islands. They at one time had both, but they were voted common nuisances and exterminated by general consent. The hogs destroyed their plantations of yams, sweet potatoes, tara, and bananas. These, and the bread- fruit and cocoa-nuts, with fish, are what they subsist on; but, owing to the deep water round the island, fish is by no means plentiful.

== Field work ==
The best known researcher of Tikopia is New Zealand anthropologist Raymond Firth, who lived on the island for 12 months between 1928 and 1929. He detailed its social life in We the Tikopia: A Sociological Study of Kinship in Primitive Polynesia (1936).. He showed how the society was divided geographically into two zones and was organized into four clans, headed by clan chiefs. At the core of social life was te paito – the house inherited from male (patrilineal) ancestors, who were buried inside it. Intricate economic and ritual links between paito houses and deference to the chiefs within the clan organization were key dimensions of island life.

However, material had been gathered before Firth's stay. W. H. R. Rivers, the psychiatrist and anthropologist, devoted a chapter of his 1914 History of Melanesian Society to Tikopia, relying on two local informants, John Pantutun and John Maresere, as well as his own day-long visit on the twice-yearly steamer, and Rev. W. J. Durrad of the Melanisian Mission. Discussions with these men helped Rivers come to an understanding of the classificatory kinship system. Relationships with the family grouping of one's mother (matrilateral relations) were very important. The relations between a woman's brother and her son (the maternal uncle- nephew relationship) had a sacred dimension: the uncle oversaw the passage of his nephew through life, in particular, officiating at his manhood ceremonies.

Firth, who did his post-graduate anthropological study under Bronislaw Malinowski in 1924, speculates about the ways population control may have been achieved, including celibacy, warfare (including expulsion), infanticide and sea-voyaging (which claimed many youths). Firth's book, Tikopia Ritual and Belief (1967, London, George Allen & Unwin) remains an important source for the study of Tikopia culture. He visited again, introducing younger social anthropologists to Tikopia: James Spillius in 1952 and Torben Monberg in 1966. Firth updated his own work with Social Change in Tikopia: Re-study of a Polynesian Comrnurrity after a Generation (1959).

Based on fieldwork in 1964–65, Eric H. Larsen wrote Nukufero: A Tikopian Colony in the Russell Islands, documenting labour migration to Levers Pacific Plantations.The first female anthropologist was Judith Macdonald in 1980, whose research resulted in Women of Tikopia (1991) . Other researchers include ethnobotanist Douglas Yen and archaeologist Patrick Kirch. Richard Feinberg has researched Tikiopia's smaller neighbour, Anuta.

== Religion ==
In Tikopian mythology Atua Fafine and Atua I Raropuka are creator gods and Atua I Kafika is the supreme sky god.

The Anglican Melanesian Mission first made contact with Tikopia in 1858, a decade after its foundation in New Zealand. A mission teacher was not allowed to settle on the island until 1907. This was a Melanesian man who married a Tikopian woman and spent the rest of his life on the island. Conversion to Christianity of the total population did not occur until the 1950s. Administratively, Tikopia is part of the Anglican Church of Melanesia's Diocese of Temotu.

The introduction of Christianity resulted to the banning of traditional birth control, which had the consequence of a 50% increase of the population: 1,200 in 1920 to 1,800 in 1950. The increase in population resulted in migration to other places in the Solomon Islands, including in the settlement of Nukukaisi in Makira.

== Cultural significance ==
Jared Diamond's 2005 book Collapse: How Societies Choose to Fail or Succeed describes Tikopia as a success case in matching the challenges of sustainability, contrasting it with Easter Island.

Owing to its role in the discovery of the fate of the La Perouse expedition, Tikopia had made its mark on the map. In 1914 the anthropologist W. H. R. Rivers called the tiny island well-known. American journalist Vern Smith gave Tikopia a separate mention in presenting Morgan's theory of social evolution to the readers of The Industrial Pioneer in 1925.

In a coincidence of timing with the investigations of Peter Dillon, an official scientific expedition, with a secondary commission to hunt for news of La Perouse. left France for Oceania in April 1826. Captain Dumont d'Urville had aboard his ship the Astrolabe his second in command Lieutenant Charles Jacquinot, as well as Jean René Constant Quoy and Joseph Paul Gaimard (both of them naval surgeons and naturalists), and René Primevère Lesson (surgeon). All of these officers wrote of their encounters with Tikopia, and the expedition's artists drew portraits there. In 1830 they were already calling Tikopia well-known.

== 21st century ==
Cyclone Zoe in December 2002 devastated the vegetation and human settlements of the island. Despite the extensive damage, no deaths were reported, as the islanders followed their traditions and sheltered in the caves in the higher ground. The narrow bank that separated the freshwater lagoon from the sea was breached by the storm, resulting in the continuing contamination of the lagoon by saltwater, and the threatened death of the sago palms on which the islanders depend for survival. A remarkable international effort by "friends of" the island, including many yacht crews who had had contact with Tikopia over the decades, culminated in the construction in 2006 of a gabion dam to seal the breach.

In 2009, a double canoe was donated to Tikopia, to ensure its own independent sea transport. The project began in 2005, when Hanneke Boon and James Wharram began to raise money for "A Voyaging Canoe for Tikipoia". These British-based catamaran designers closely followed the hull shape of the traditional Tikopia craft, as represented by Rakeitonga, a 9 m outrigger canoe acquired by the Auckland Museum in 1916. A pair of boats slightly larger than this were constructed to their specifications in the Philippines in 2008. The 'Lapita Tikopia' and its sistership 'Lapita Anuta' took five months to sail to the islands, following the ancient migration route of the Lapita people into the Pacific. This voyage of maritime archaeology culminated in the gift of these boats to the islanders, with the intention of ending " an era of being cut off from the surrounding islands and their extended family connections" and allowing deep-sea fishing once more.

In 2013 a Norwegian mother and father brought their two children and a nephew to Tikopia and lived there for six months. A film crew went along to capture footage. The resulting show focuses on the experiences of their young daughter, Ivi, with the children of the island, attending school, visiting chief Tafua and his family, and so on. The 13 episode children's series ("Message in a Bottle") was shown on NRK television channel NRK Super.

In October 2018, one of the chiefs of the island, Ti Namo, made his first visit to the western world to share his worries about climate change. He travelled with a delegation to Grenoble in France, where he presented his documentary Nous Tikopia before a national release on 7 November, and declared to the press, "Before, we suffered a cyclone every ten years. Today it's every two years."
