= Bruce Armstrong (sculptor) =

Australian sculptor (1957–2024)

- Born: 1957
- Died: 4 April 2024 (aged 67); Melbourne, Victoria, Australia
- Education: Fine Art Royal Melbourne Institute of Technology 1981
- Occupation: Sculptor
- Notable work: Owl, Bunjil the eagle
- Website: https://brucearmstrong.com.au/

Bruce Armstrong (1957 – 4 April 2024) was an Australian sculptor, painter, printer and charcoal artist. He is known for his large public sculptures such as Eagle (Bunjil) in Melbourne, Australia and Owl in Belconnen, Australian Capital Territory. He had a major retrospective exhibition at the National Gallery of Victoria in 2017.

== Biography ==
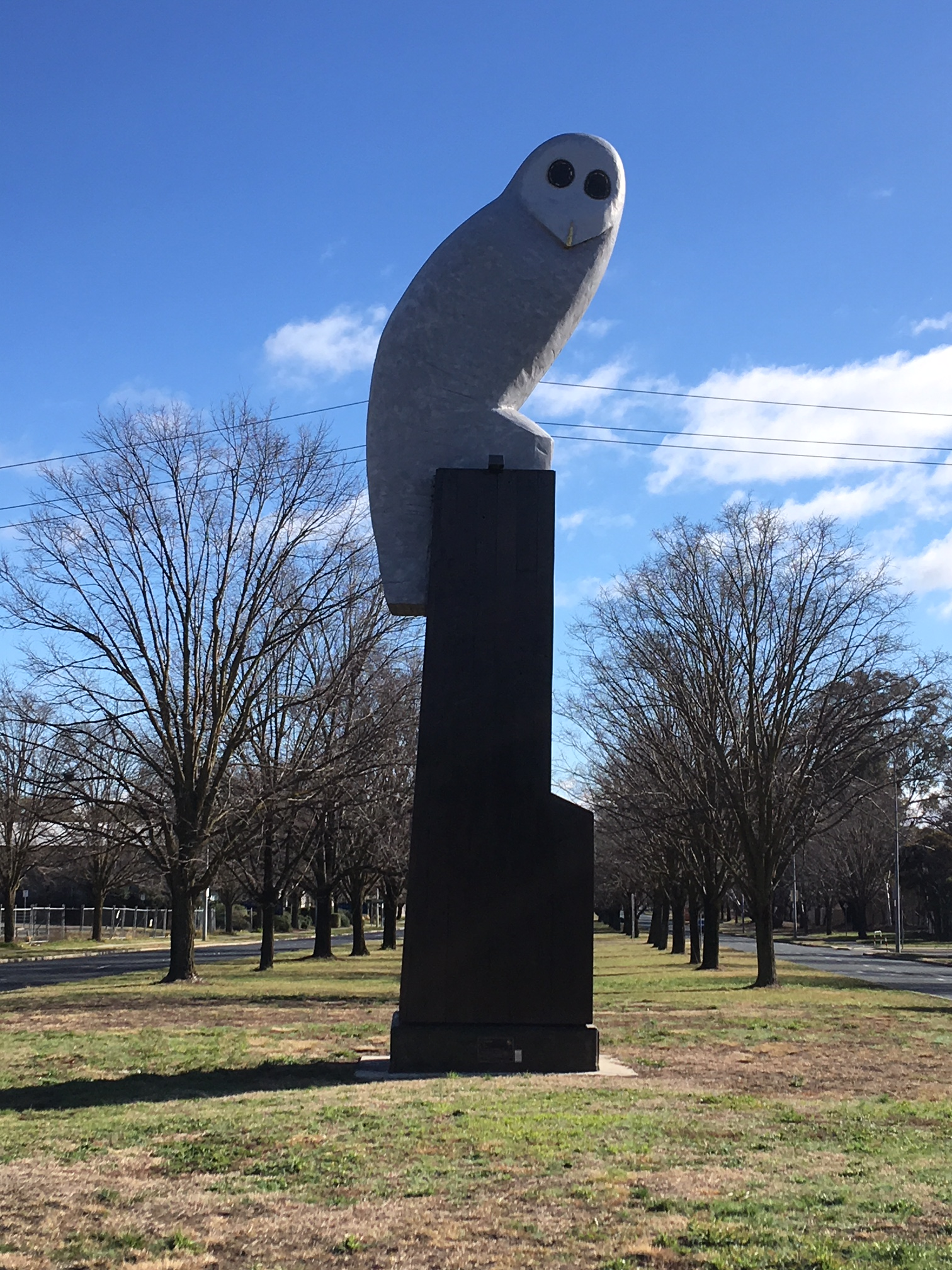
The Big Powerful Owl by Bruce Armstrong in September 2018

Born in 1957, Armstrong studied painting and sculpture at the Royal Melbourne Institute of Technology in Melbourne graduating in 1981. He died after a long illness in Melbourne, on 4 April 2024, at the age of 67.

== Work ==
Armstrong is best known for his large public artworks such as the 25 metre high Bunjil (2003) installed on Wurundjeri Way in Melbourne and The Guardians (1987), which stood at either side of the water wall of the National Gallery of Victoria. His sculpture The Big Powerful Owl is 8m tall and represents a Powerful Owl (Ninox strenua).

Armstrong was also a painter and his 2000 portrait of Peter Carey is held by the National Portrait Gallery Canberra. In 1994, his portrait of artist Jan Senbergs was a finalist in the Archibald prize and in 2005, Armstrong's self portrait was selected as a finalist.

An exhibition of Armstrong's prints and sculptures entitled Savage Beauty was curated by Ted Gott and held at Heide Museum of Modern Art in 1999. Armstrong was honoured with a retrospective of his work at the National Gallery of Victoria that ran from August 2016 to January 2017. Entitled 'An Anthology of Strange Creatures' the show consisted of 40 of Armstrong's works spread across three floors of the NGV Australia.

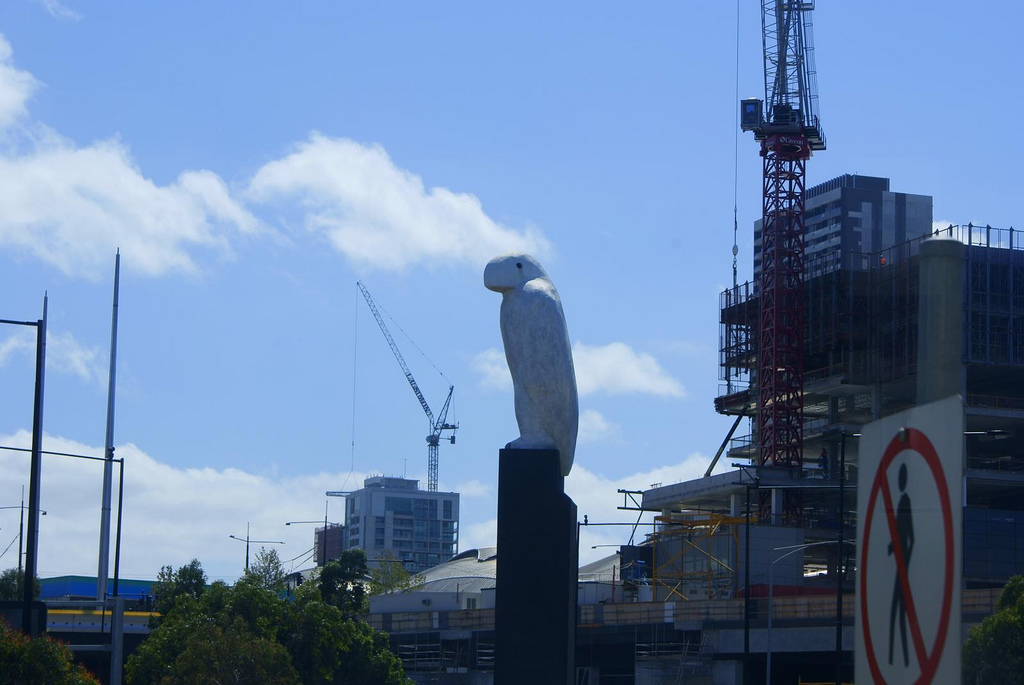
sculpture Eagle (2003) by Bruce Armstrong in Wurundjeri Way, Victoria Australia
