= Tikokura =

In the mythology of Mangaia in the Cook Islands, Tikokura is a sea-dwelling evil spirit in the shape of a storm wave.

Ngaru determined to try his strength against Tikokura and his shark-like companion, Tumuitearetoka. He provided himself with a surfboard named Orua (the two). Ngaru went to the edge of the reef and called out insults against the two demons, who promptly appeared to exact revenge. A huge smashed over the reef, and Ngaru let himself be washed out to sea.

Tumuitearetoka saw his chance to strike, but Moko, Ngaru's grandfather, was sitting on a high rock and called out "The shark is below you!" The wave and the shark kept attacking, but each time Moko warned his grandson, who was able to outwit them and live on. After eight days and nights, Ngaru threw his surfboard to the monsters, who gladly retired to their home in the deep, while Ngaru went off to find Tongatea, his wife (Gill 1876:225-227).
