= Cabaguil =

God in Maya mythology

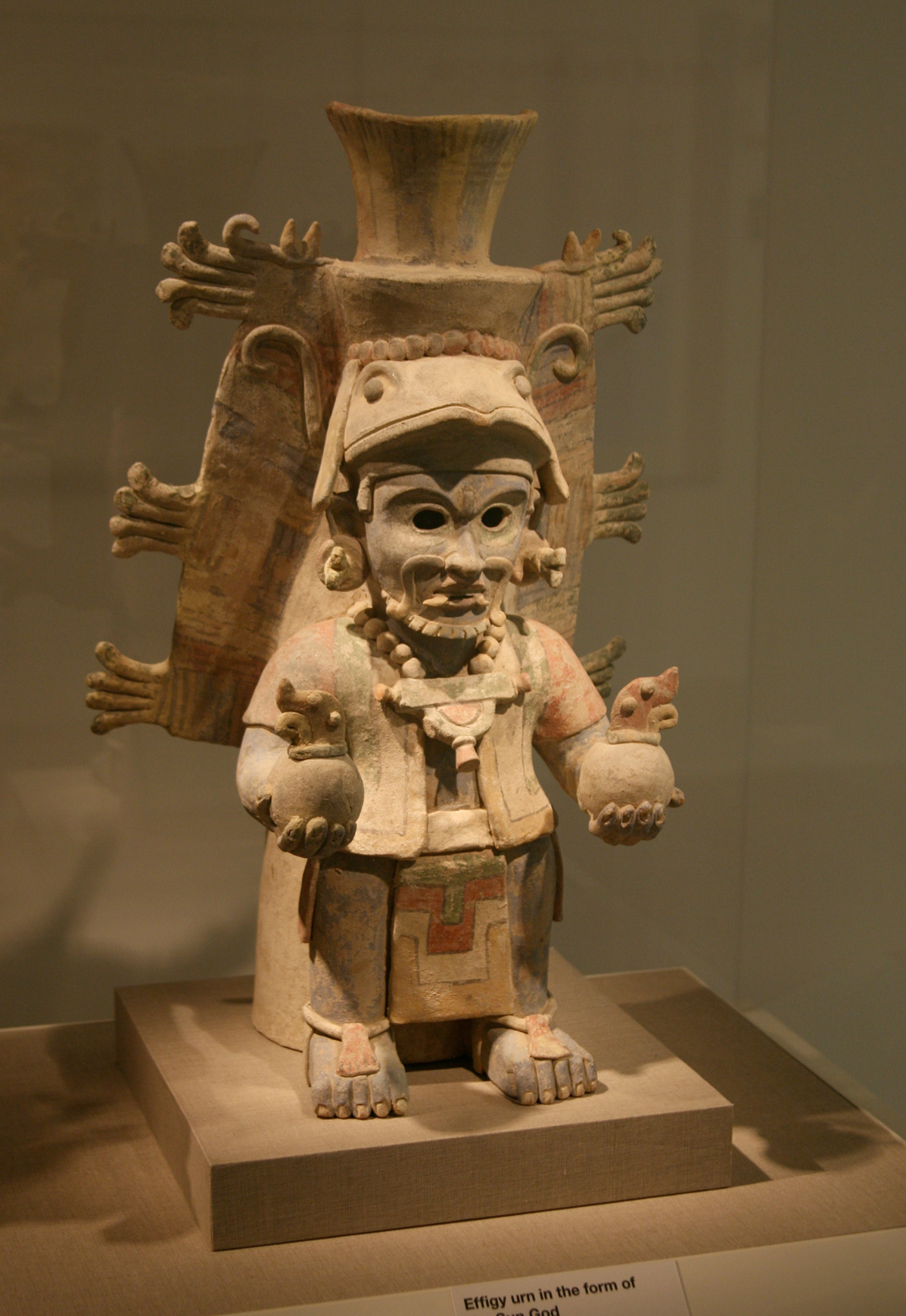

In Maya mythology, Cabaguil (lit. 'Heart of the Sky') was a solar god who assisted in the creation of human beings.

== Creation myth ==
In Mayan society, gods were seen as the source of life. According to the creation myth in Popol Vuh, the universe began as an undifferentiated chaos. The spiritual powers were separated into deities, and the universe was split into three entities: the heavens, the earth and the underworld. These entities were ruled by the gods Tzacol, Bitol, Alom and Oaholom. Tepeu (god of lightning and fire), Gukumatz (god of wind and rain), and Cabaguil (the solar god) joined them to form a council. Together, they created plants and animals. Lastly, the deities created human beings to recognize and worship them. Other deities were also involved in the process, as they only succeeded on the third attempt.

Cabaguil was also referred to as "Heart of the Sky"; he was one of the most important sky gods.
