= James Wharram =

British catamaran designer (1928–2021)

- Born: May 15, 1928; Manchester, England
- Died: December 14, 2021 (aged 93)
- Website: https://wharram.com/

James Wharram (15 May 1928 – 14 December 2021) was a British multihull pioneer and designer of catamarans.

== Polynesian beginnings ==
Wharram was born in Manchester, England. In 1953, after long studies into the records of boats of the Pacific in the libraries and museums of Britain, and inspired by Eric de Bisschop's book The voyage of the Kaimiloa, he designed and built the first British ocean-going double-canoe-catamaran, the Tangaroa (length 23 feet 6 inches (7.16 m)) and in 1955–56 sailed with Jutta Schultze-Rhonhof and Ruth Merseburger, across the Atlantic to Trinidad – the beginning of cruising and transatlantic crossing with a catamaran.

No scholars in the Western world at this time believed that the Polynesians had boats capable of directed ocean voyages. Wharram believed otherwise and set out to prove it by doing it himself. He followed this first Atlantic crossing by building a 40-foot V-hull double canoe, Rongo, in Trinidad in 1957–58, with Bernard Moitessier's help, and sailing her across the North Atlantic in 1959 from New York to Ireland. This was the first west-to-east crossing of the Atlantic by catamaran or multihull.

The story was told by Wharram in the 1969 book Two Girls Two Catamarans.

From 1973 Wharram was assisted by his co-designer Hanneke Boon. In 1987-92 James and his partners built a new flagship, the 63-foot catamaran Spirit of Gaia, which they sailed into the Pacific and round the world, to study Indo-Pacific canoe-craft (1994–98).

== The Lapita Voyage ==
In 2008–09 James Wharram and Hanneke Boon conceived the Lapita Voyage expedition, sailing two double canoes based on traditional Polynesian hullform and crab claw sails, from the Philippines to Tikopia and Anuta in the Solomon Islands. The ‘Lapita Voyage’ was a major expedition in Experimental Marine Archaeology. It was the first exploration of one possible migration route into the Central Pacific by Ethnic sailing craft.

== Wharram catamaran designs ==
After his pioneering catamaran voyages across the Atlantic, which proved the seaworthiness of his double-canoe designs, Wharram started designing simple to build double-canoe/catamarans for self-builders, developing a unique slot-together building method, using plywood. This design business was established in 1965 under the name Polynesian Catamarans and hundreds of his Classic Designs ranging from 16ft to 51ft were sold over the next 10 years. Since 1980 Wharram and his partners, Ruth Wharram and co-designer Hanneke Boon, have been trading as James Wharram Designs and over 10,000 Wharram designs, ranging from 14ft to 63ft have been sold worldwide. Since the passing of Ruth (2013) and James (2021) Hanneke Boon is running the design business together with her and James' son.

Wharram designs are inspired by Polynesian double canoes and typically have an open deck, with small deckpod(s) for crew shelter. Wharram and Boon combined boat building with studies of Polynesian culture. Most modern catamarans are built as a single rigid structure thereby sustaining greater forces and stresses in waves, whereas on Wharrams the separate hulls are connected to the crossbeams with (synthetic) rope lashings, in true Polynesian style. The flexibility of the Wharram system makes the boats suffer less stress in ocean waves.

Wharram and Boon's designs cover a range of sizes from the 14 feet (4.3 m) Hitia to the 63 feet (19 m) Pahi 63 Gaia. All his designs since 1980 are designed to be built in ply/epoxy/glass composite and have many features unique to Wharram designs.

The rig on Wharrams since the early 1980s is the 'Wharram Wingsail Rig', an appropriate tech square-headed rig with streamlined pocket round the mast and a short adjustable gaff at the head. The advantages of this rig are simplicity, low turbulence and the fact that it can be lowered in a following wind at any time. The Centre of effort on all Wharram rigs is kept low, giving them very good stability. No full-size Wharram has been known to have capsized.

Many of the cabin interiors are designed to flexy-space principles, the concept being multi-purpose space on a human scale, in which less is more and the simpler the construction, the better. The slim v-shaped hulls have a very good speed/length ratio and all have canoe sterns, giving minimum drag, even when loaded. This hullshape requires no keels or boards to sail to windward, giving hulls with little draft and easy beachability. Wharram also keeps freeboards low for minimum windage.

James Wharram set up the Polynesian Catamaran Association in 1968 to help promote his designs. The association organised meets and rallies and published a regular news letter. The association was wound up after the death of the last chair person, Ken Hook, as nobody was in a position to take on running the association. The magazines were digitized by a volunteer and can be found, together with a history of the association on the website. At present owners and enthusiasts of Wharram designs organize Hui's (meetings of boats) through social media.

James Wharram is considered the ‘father’ of multihulls in many countries, and used to be referred to as a ‘Living legend’ in his lifetime.

== Personal life and death ==
Wharram died on 14 December 2021, at the age of 93.

== Memberships ==
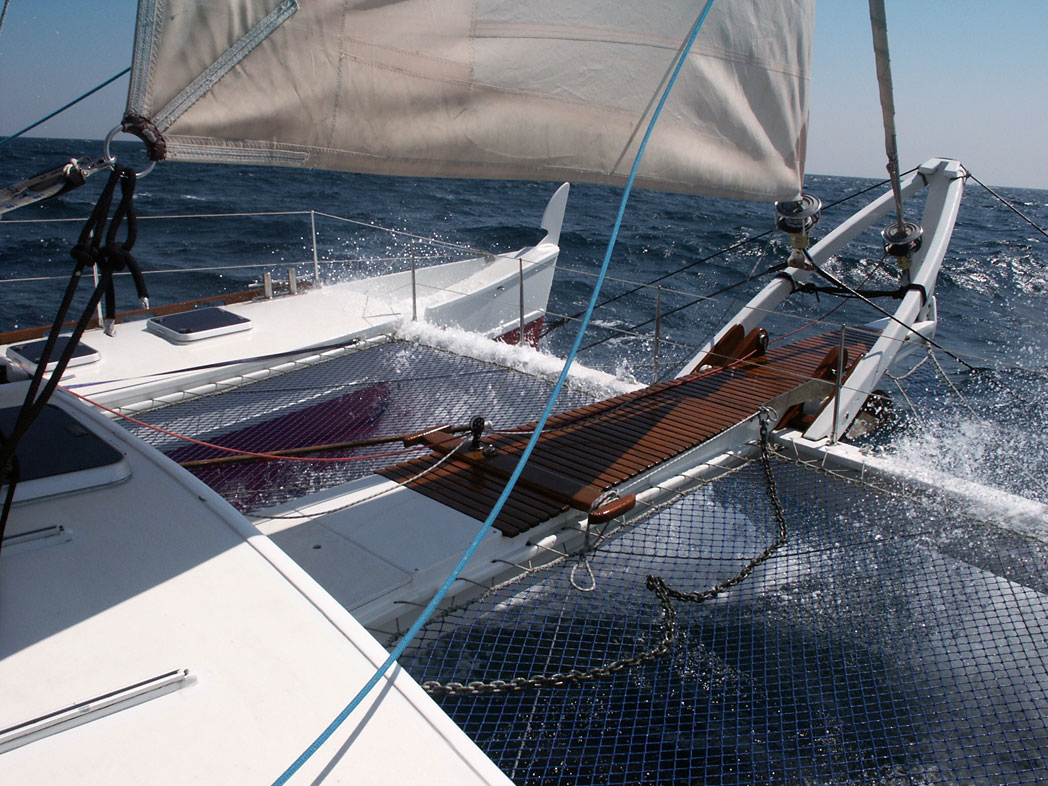
Pahi 63, Wharram self built catamaran

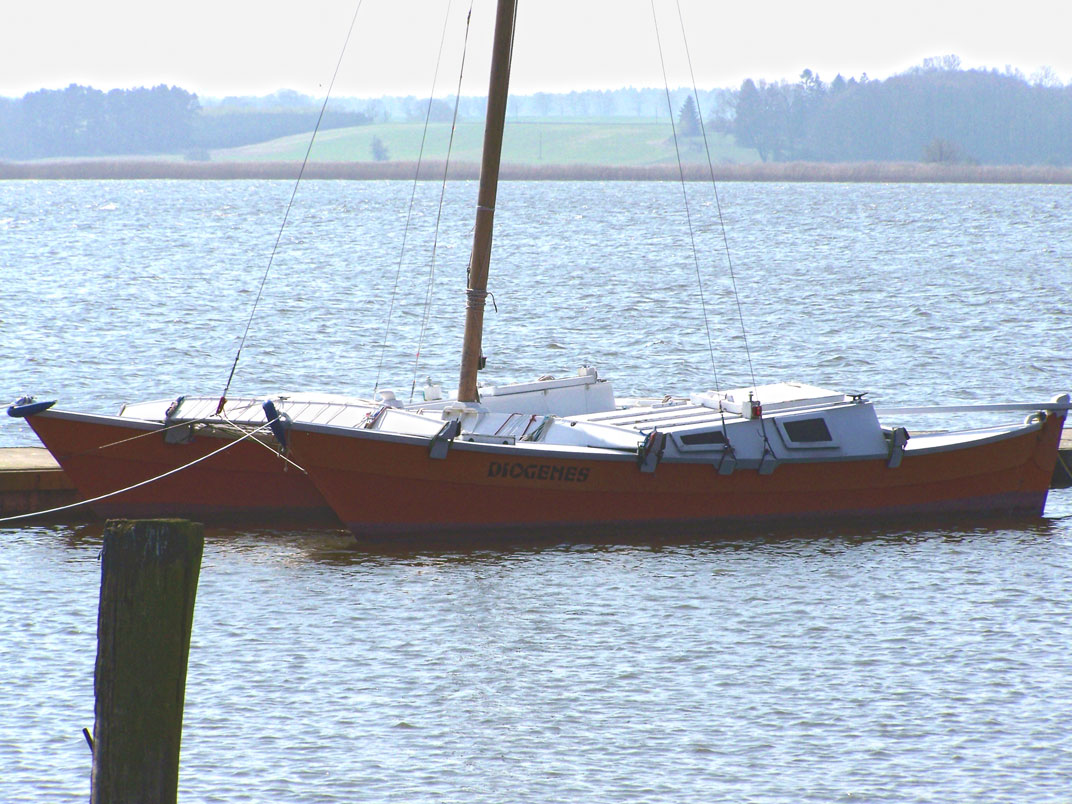
Tiki 26, Wharram self built catamaran at Usedom

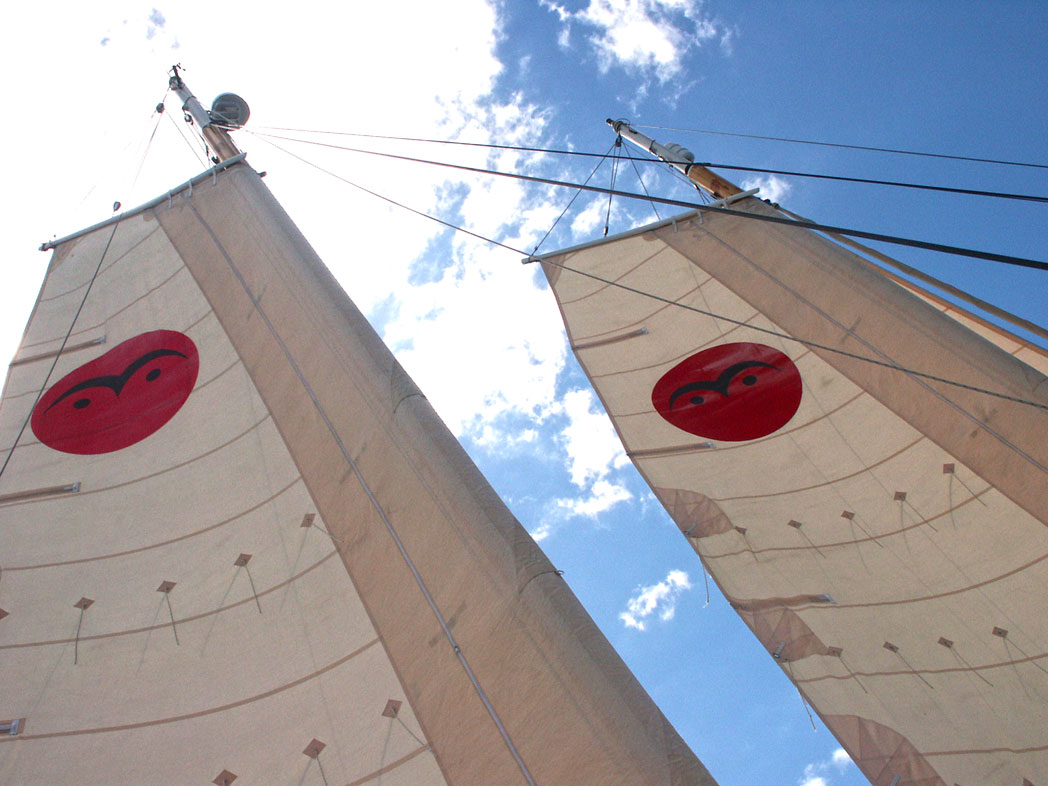
Pahi 63, Self built catamaran

- 1967 – 2010: British Marine (formerly the British Marine Industries Federation, BMIF).
- 1968 – 2009: Polynesian Catamaran Association (PCA). Founding Member.
- 1968 – 1975: Multihull Offshore Cruising and Racing Association (MOCRA). Founding Member.
- 1968 – 1978: Little Ship Club.
- 1973 – 2021: Royal Yachting Association (RYA).
- 1977 – 1991: Committee member of the RYA Cruising Committee
- 1992 – 2021: Andean Explorer's Club. Honorary Member.
- 1996 – 2021: Roskilde Vikingship Museum friends.
- 2000 – 2021: Cruising Association.
- 2005 – 2021: Association of Yachting Historians.
- 2009 – 2021: Fellow of the Royal Geographical Society.
- 2013 – 2021: Ocean Cruising Club.

== Publications ==
- Ocean-going catamarans. 1962. Ciba Technical Notes 231, Cambridge, UK
- Two Girls, Two Catamarans, 1969. Story of Ruth and Jutta, the Tangaroa and the Rongo
- Tehini. October 1970, Yachting Monthly, UK. Seminal article on Design approach.
- The Stable Multihull. 1976. (Researched for 1st World Multihull Symposium, Toronto.)
- The Sailing Community. 1978, Wooden Boat, USA, Prize-winning proposal for ‘Waterborne International Communities’.
- Catamaran Stability – Figures, Facts and Fictions. 1991. Practical Boat Owner, UK. Also published in several other countries.
- Nomads of the Wind. October 1994. Practical Boat Owner, UK. Analysis of the sailing qualities of the Polynesian Double Canoe.
- The Wharram Design Book: Build Yourself a Modern Sea - Going Polynesian Catamaran, 1996
- Going Dutch: The Tiki Wing Sail Rig. 1998, Practical Boat Owner, UK. Also published in several other countries, incl. Australia, Holland and France.
- Lessons from the Stone Age Sailors, A Study of Canoe Form Craft in the Pacific and Indian Ocean.
- Vikings go Home, November 2008. Classic Boat, UK. (Article about voyage of the 100 ft Vikingship reconstruction ‘Seastallion’ from Dublin to Denmark).
- People of the Sea, December 2020, Lodestar Books, UK (with Hanneke Boon). Autobiography.

== See also ==
- List of multihulls
