= Atua I Raropuka =

Creator being in Polynesian mythology

In Polynesian mythology (specifically Tikopia), Atua I Raropuka is a creator being, often spoken of in tandem with his wife, Atua Fafine.

Raropuka is the lesser creator-god. He was invoked after the creation of the world within the sky, and was directed to give man all his knowledge.

Which foodstuffs were edible, which animals were to become man's totems and which were taboo, as these are either messengers or omens. Taking a totem animal is allowed within the clan of that animal. A man must present at least one of each one of his clan's totem animals to the heads of all the other clans to become a man (among other rites of passage). A man who accidentally takes another clan's totem animals must give it either an adult male or female member of that animal's clan. Typically, the offended clan member forgives the trespass, and will return the totem with the majority of the kill intact, save for the decorative, tool-bearing, or ritualistic portions removed. A woman of any age who finds, or fishes a totem animal may do the portioning on any totem animals within or out-clan if she intends to give the portions to that clan. If a girl wishes to marry, she will actively pursue and portion totem animals and make offerings to the boy she likes.

Raropuka is the creator of medicinal plants (either herbal or drug plants) and all fruit bearing plants. Non-edible plants and flowers bearing non-edible fruits are the work of the original creator god.
