= Rongo (catamaran) =

Catamaran built in 1958 in Trinidad by James Wharram

Rongo was a 40 ft (12 m) ketch rigged catamaran built in 1958 in Trinidad by James Wharram and sailed by him and his two German women companions, Jutta Schultze Rohnhoff and Ruth Merseburger, from Trinidad to Ireland, via New York, arriving end of August 1959. Rongo was the first catamaran to sail from West to East across the North Atlantic. Rongo made two more Atlantic crossings, from Canaries to Trinidad in 1960 and the return voyagefrom Bermuda to the UK in 1961, when she was still the only catamaran to have made this West to East voyage. Wharram then proceeded to live on the vessel in Deganwy North Wales. After these voyages Wharram started designing catamarans for people to build themselves, based on his experience of designing, building and sailing Rongo. After Rongo James Wharram built his next catamaran 51ft Tehini on Deganwy pier. He donated Rongo to the seascouts. The pioneering voyages made by Rongo can be read in James Wharram's book Two Girls Two Catamarans. James Wharram has also written his autobiography People of the Sea.

== See also ==
- List of multihulls
