= Balayang =

Mythological figure of Kulin Australian Aboriginal people

In the mythology of the Aboriginal people of south-eastern Australia (specifically, the Kulin nation), Balayang or Pallian the bat was a brother of Bunjil the eaglehawk, but lived apart from him. Once, Bunjil asked him to come and live with him, but Balayang replied that Bunjil's country was too dry and that Bunjil ought to come and live with him instead. This upset Bunjil, who sent his two helpers, Djurt-djurt the nankeen kestrel and Thara the quail hawk, after Balayang. They set fire to the bat's country and Balayang and his family were scorched and turned permanently black. Another story says that Balayang formed the oceans, rivers, and creeks.

Because of his black colouring, Balayang was associated with Crow, and thus belonged to the moiety in opposition to Eaglehawk. Another story credits him with creating or finding Crow women (and thus marriage partners for the Eaglehawk moiety). One day, Balayang was amusing himself by thumping the surface of the water, causing it to thicken into mud. Something stirred underneath the mud and, probing with a branch, he found two women. He called one Kunnawarra ("black swan") and the other Kururuk ("brolga"). He took them to Bunjil, who gave them as wives to the men he had created. Balayang was represented in the night sky by the star Antares.
