= Owl (Armstrong) =

One of Australia's 150 big things

Coordinates: 35°14′51″S 149°04′03″E

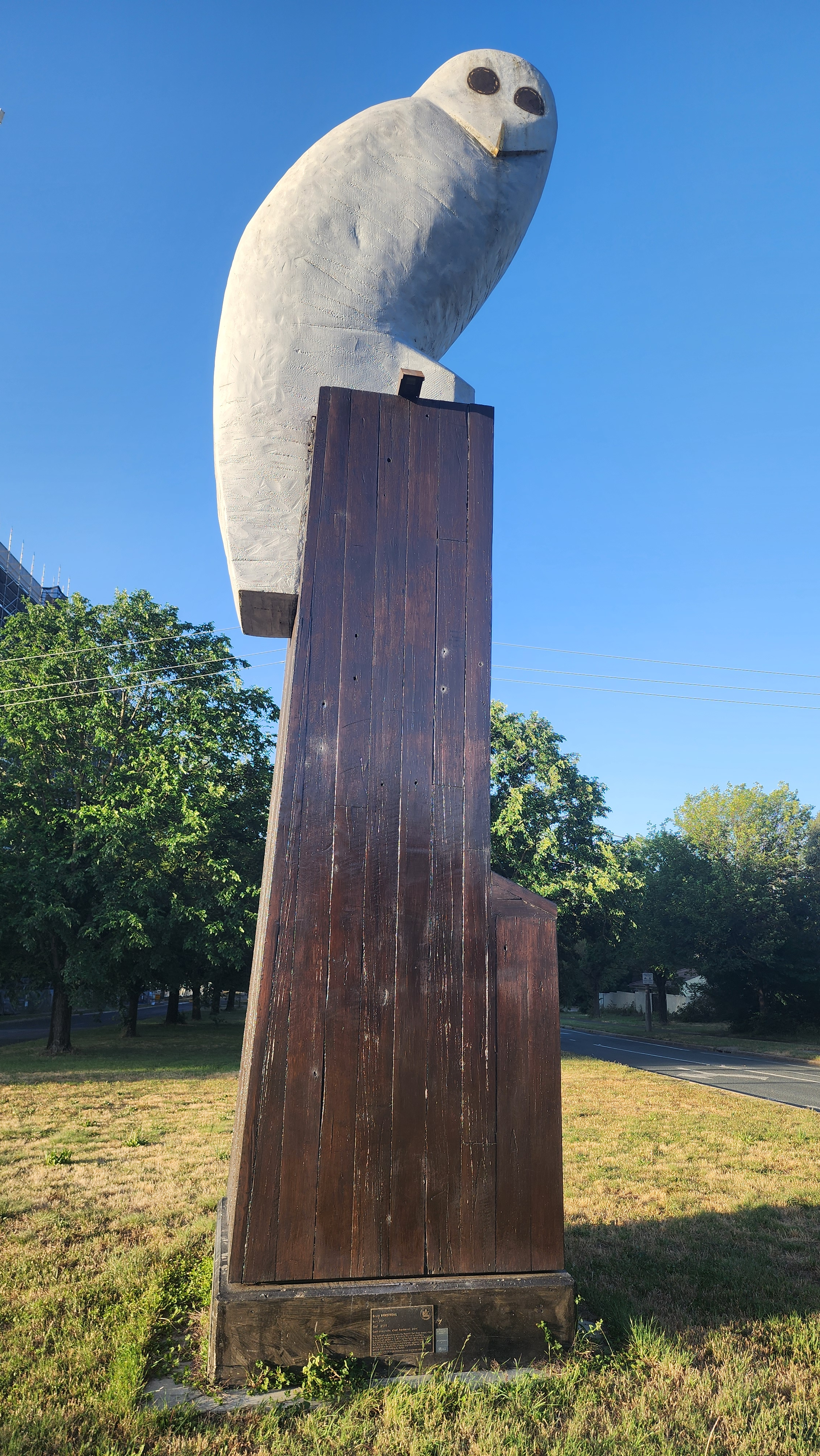
Owl by Bruce Armstrong

Owl, informally known as the Belconnen Owl or the Penis Owl, is a sculpture 8 m (26 ft) tall, designed by the Australian sculptor Bruce Armstrong, located in the Belconnen district of Canberra, Australia; it depicts a powerful owl (Ninox strenua).

Erected in 2011 and made of concrete, it is celebrated as one of numerous "big things" in the Australian Capital Territory (ACT).

== Reception ==
The owl's form has been lampooned for having a phallic shape, especially when viewed from behind. It has become a tourist attraction; the Australian politician Tara Cheyne called it a "must see". The work has been nicknamed the "penis owl", "the Great Penis Owl of Belconnen", and "the Great Penis Owl of Canberra".

The statue has attracted graffiti; the ACT government spent A$3000 on cleaning it in the year prior to July 2017, and said they planned to install CCTV cameras to discourage and capture future vandalism.
