= Ngaru =

Mythological hero

Ngaru is a mythological hero from Avaiki (Hawaiki) in the mythology of Mangaia in the Cook Islands. Ngaru's mother was Vaiare and his grandfather the great lizard Moko. His wife was the beautiful Tongatea. To prove his prowess, he battles Tikokura and the shark Tumuitearetoka, who he outwits with the aid of Moko. he later descends to the underworld and returns to the land of the living where he subsequently defeats the sky fairies and Amai-te-rangi, a sky demon.
