= Moko (mythology) =

Character from Mangaia mythology

In the mythology of Mangaia in the Cook Islands, Moko is a wily character and grandfather of the heroic Ngaru.

Moko is a ruler or king of the lizards, and he orders his lizard subjects to climb into the basket of the sky demon Amai-te-rangi to spy on him. When Amai-te-rangi pulls up his basket, he is disappointed to find it full of miserable little reptiles, which escape and overrun his home in the sky.
