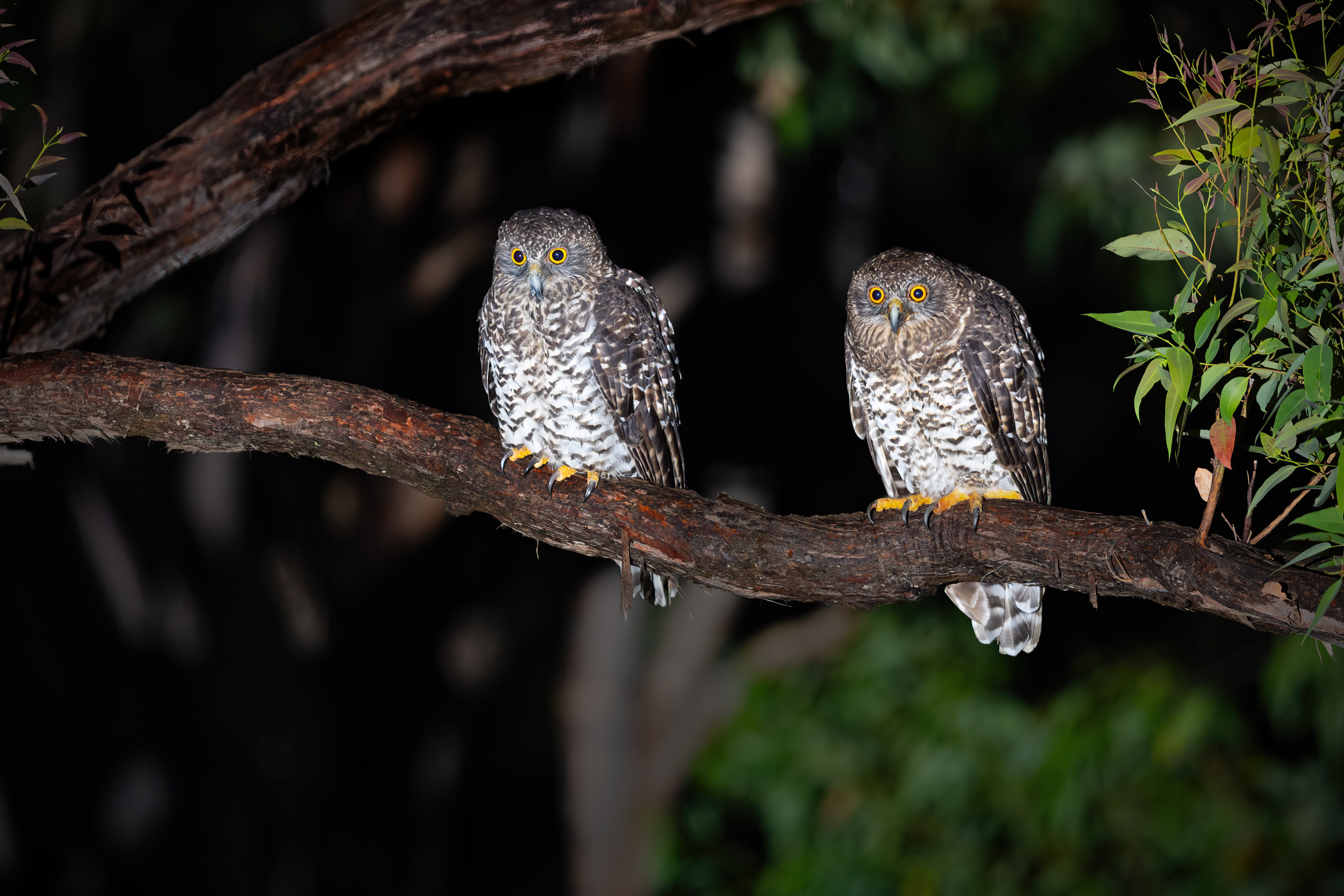
- Male and female powerful owl, Sydney

Conservation status
- Least Concern (IUCN 3.1)
- CITES Appendix II

Scientific classification
- Kingdom: Animalia
- Phylum: Chordata
- Class: Aves
- Order: Strigiformes
- Family: Strigidae
- Genus: Ninox
- Species: N. strenua

Binomial name
- Ninox strenua (Gould, 1838)
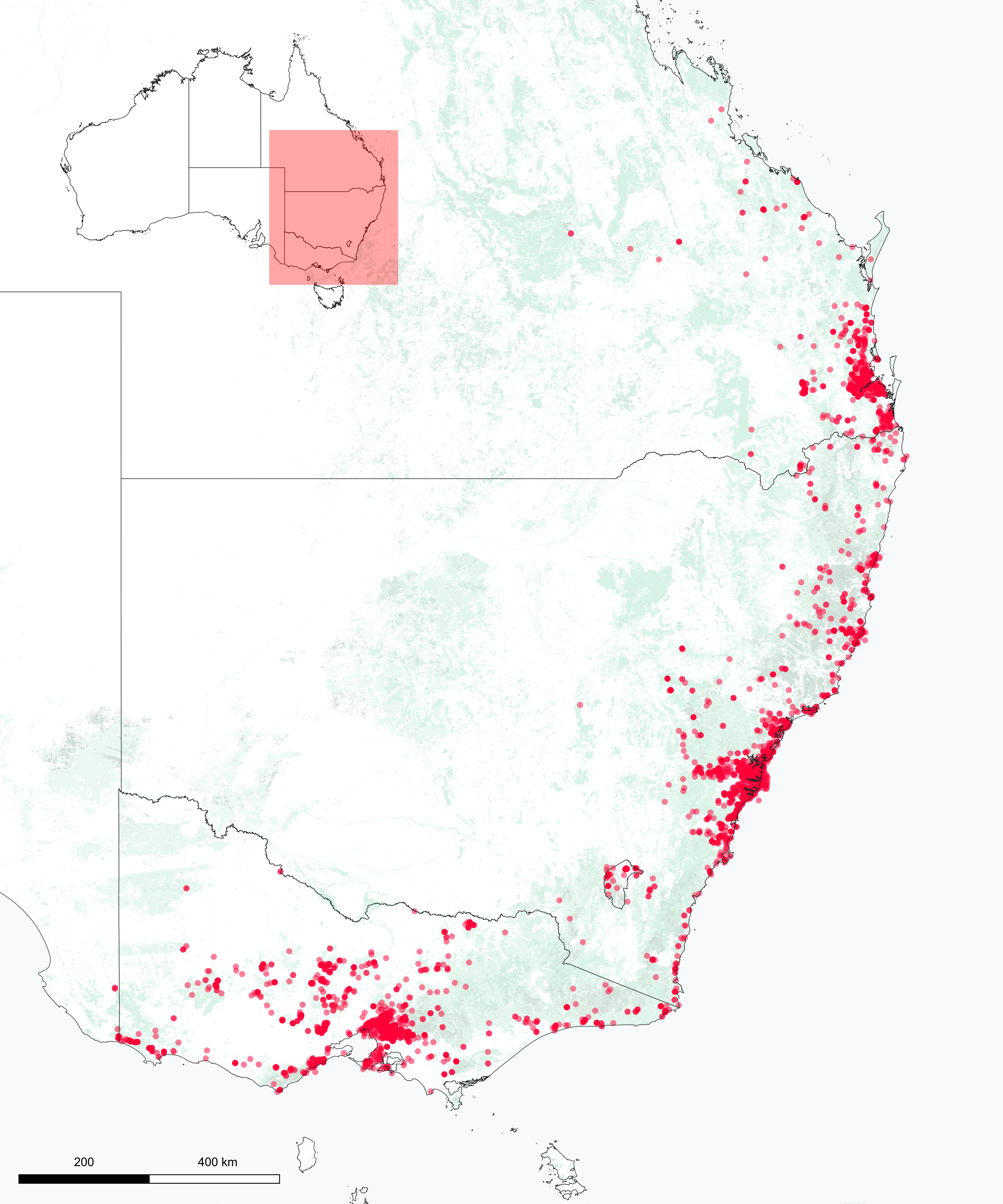
- The distribution of the powerful owl

= Powerful owl =

Australian owl species

The powerful owl (Ninox strenua), a species of owl native to south-eastern and eastern Australia, is the largest owl on the continent. It is found in coastal areas and in the Great Dividing Range, rarely more than 200 km (120 mi) inland. The IUCN Red List of Threatened Species also refers to this species as the powerful boobook.

An apex predator in its narrow distribution, powerful owls are often opportunists, like most predators, but generally are dedicated to hunting arboreal mammals, in particular small to medium-sized marsupials. Such prey can comprise about three-quarters of their diet. Generally, this species lives in primary forests with tall, native trees, but can show some habitat flexibility when not nesting.

The powerful owl is a typically territorial raptorial bird that maintains a large home range and has long intervals between egg-laying and hatching of clutches. Also, like many types of raptorial birds, they must survive a long stretch to independence in young owls after fledging. Unlike most raptorial birds, however, male powerful owls are larger and stronger than females, so the male takes the dominant position in the mating pair, which extends to food distribution.

== Description ==
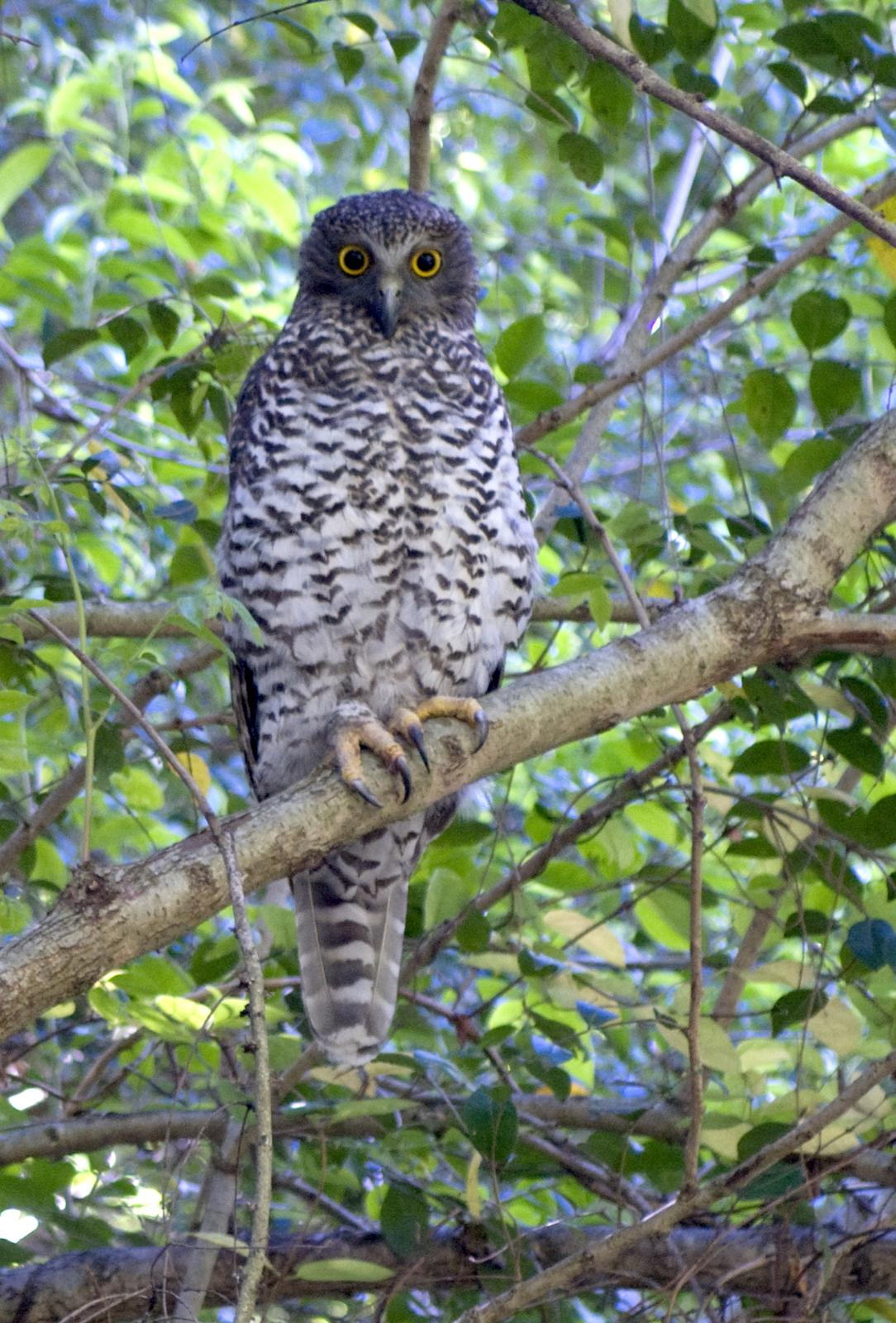
Powerful owl – Sydney, NSW, Australia

The powerful owl has a long tail and a small head, giving it an atypical silhouette for an owl and imparting a more hawk-like appearance than any other large owl. The protruding bill and distinct brow ridges enhance the hawk-like appearance of the species. The facial disc is ill-defined. The upper parts are dark grey-brown, mottled, and barred with whitish. The underparts are white with bold, grey-brown, V-shaped barring. The tail has six narrow white bars contrasting with grey-brown. This species has large yellow eyes, with greyish feathering down to the base of the toes and feet of a dull yellow colour. They are aptly named, with very powerful and heavy claws. This owl is the largest species of the "hawk owl" group found in much of Asia and the Australasian region, all included in the genus Ninox. It can be considered, along with its sister species the rufous owl (N. rufa), as Australia's analogue to the genus Bubo.

This species measures 45 to 65 cm (18 to 26 in) in length and spans 112 to 135 cm (44 to 53 in) across the wings. Unlike in a vast majority of owl species, the male is slightly larger than the female on average. Body mass in males has been reported at 0.99 to 2.22 kg (2.2 to 4.9 lb), with 13 males averaging 1.45 kg (3.2 lb), while females can weigh from 1.04 to 1.6 kg (2.3 to 3.5 lb), with an average in 9 females of 1.25 kg (2.8 lb). Among all the owls in the world, the powerful owl is the ninth longest from bill-to-tail, the tenth heaviest and the eighth longest winged. Its body mass is about the same on average as the great horned owl (Bubo virginianus), but it has a proportionately much longer tail and wings than that species. The wing chord length further illustrates slight sexual dimorphism in favor of the male, with the male measuring 397 to 434 mm (15.6 to 17.1 in) and the female measuring 381 to 410 mm (15.0 to 16.1 in). The tail can be 280 mm (11 in) or more in length, the fifth longest of any owl with only the great grey (Strix nebulosa) and ural owls (Strix uralensis) having proportionately longer tails. As a relatively geographically restricted species, there are no subspecies and no known geographic variation in the powerful owl. In comparison to the barking owl (Ninox connivens), it is much larger and lacks that species' white-spotted smoky-brown colouration on the upperparts and dark grey to rusty streaks on a whitish background on the underside. The other larger and relatively powerful owl found in Australia, the rufous owl, is not found in the same range in the wild so poses no identification problem.

=== Voice ===
The male powerful owl's song is an impressive low, rather mournful-sounding and far-carrying double-hoot, whoo-hooo, each note lasting a few seconds at least, broken up by a brief silence and the second note being usually higher pitched than the first. The female has a similar call, but has a higher-pitched voice. Duets are frequently heard at the onset of breeding. Unpaired males frequently call much more regularly than paired ones.

== Distribution and habitat ==
Mount Coot-tha, SE Queensland, Australia

Their range is from Eungella and the Dawson River in Queensland south to the central highlands of Victoria and west to Mount Burr in South Australia, with the range terminating around Portland, Victoria. The habitat of the powerful owl is tall, humid forests ranging through to some drier woodlands in northern Victoria and the western slopes of New South Wales and Queensland. They can be found in wooded mountain gullies, forested ravines, wetter, heavily timbered subcoastal ranges, coastal forests and woodland, and coastal scrub. They prefer wetter, more timbered areas such as sclerophyll forests. Although usually associated with subcoastal forest, they can be found on inland mountain slopes occasionally. This is especially the case with young owls after dispersal before they can establish their own breeding territories. Recent mapping work has shown that streams between ridges covered with Eucalyptus forest are often prime habitat for this species. They also occasionally range into plantations, mainly of pine or native tree species, and urban and rural parks and gardens.

== Behaviour ==
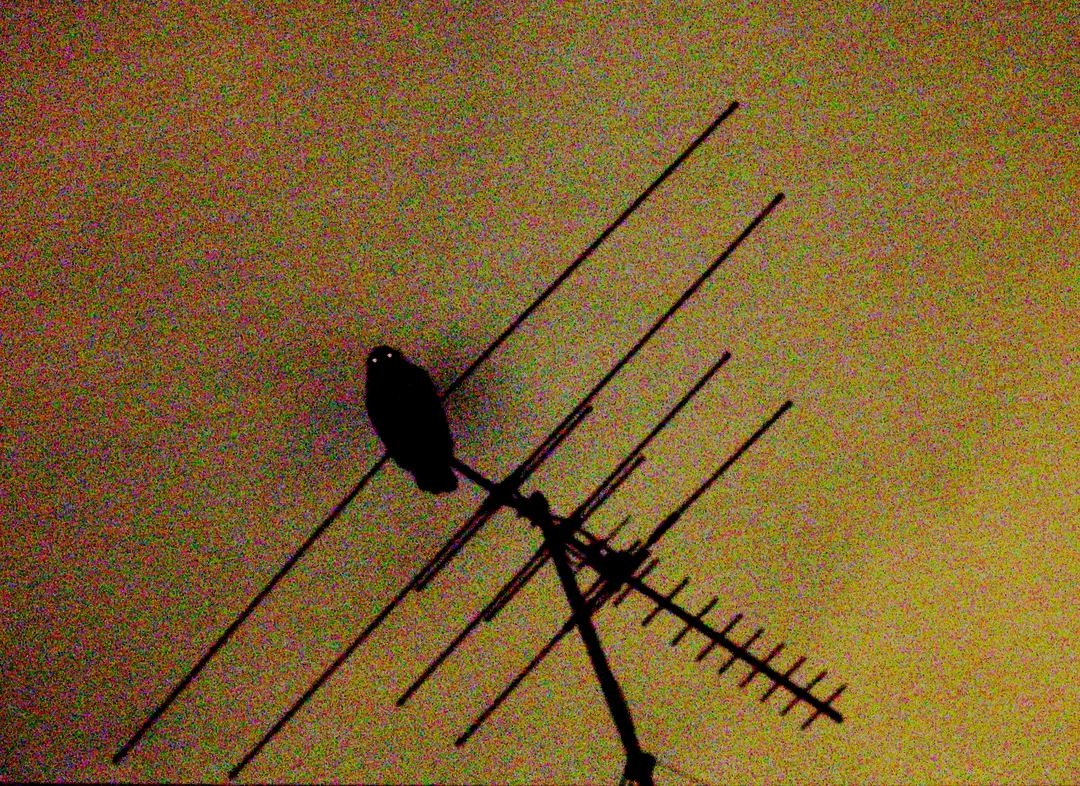
Powerful owl on a suburban TV aerial, Chatswood West, New South Wales

The powerful owl lives permanently in breeding pairs once in adulthood. They have been observed roosting singly, in pairs, and in family groups of three or four. They frequently roost during the day on branches in tall, open trees, often while still holding the prey caught the prior night. Several perches are used, and may be occupied intermittently for years at a time. The powerful owl typically flies in a slow and deliberate way on its large wings.

=== Diet ===
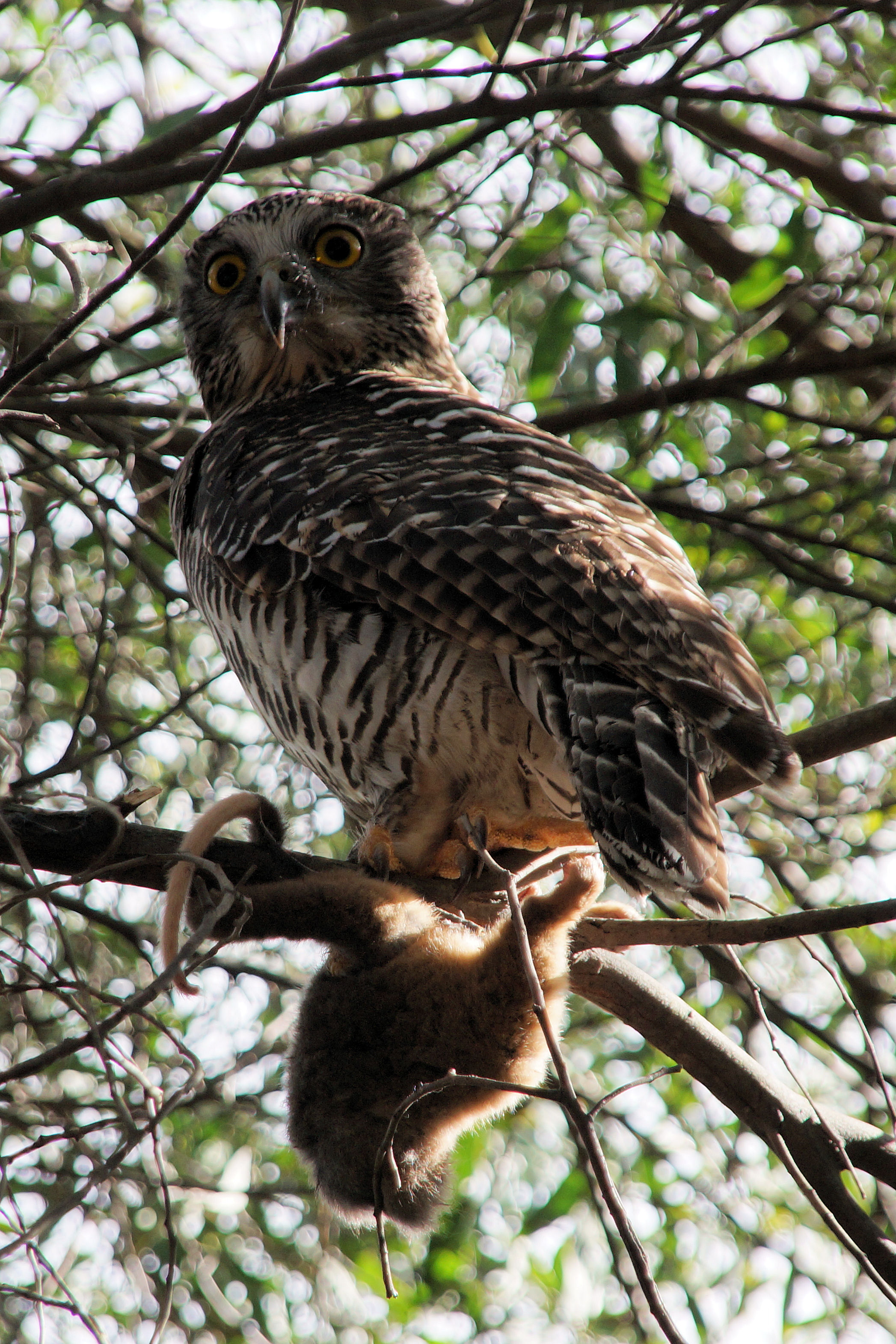
Powerful owl with its prey.

The powerful owl is the top nocturnal predator of the forests and woodlands in its range. About 75% of the diet of the powerful owl is made up of arboreal mammals. Its diet consists largely of arboreal marsupials such as flying foxes (Pteropus spp.), the southern greater glider (Petauroides volans), ringtail possums (Pseudocheiridae), brushtail possums (Trichosurus spp.), koala (Phascolarctos cinereus), sugar glider (Petaurus breviceps), and feathertail gliders (Acrobates pygmaeus). These prey species vary extensively in body size, from the feathertail glider, which has an adult weight merely of 10 to 15 g (0.35 to 0.53 oz) to the koala, typically weighing 6,000 g (13 lb), though juveniles are mainly taken in large prey species. The average estimated prey weight per one study was approximately 176 g (6.2 oz). However, another two studies stated the mean prey weight as 386.7 g (13.64 oz) and 323.2 g (11.40 oz). Not infrequently, prey weight averages between 50 and 100%, whereas, in most other raptors, including large owls, there seems to be a "rule" that most prey weighs 20% or less of the raptors' own weight. The mean weight of prey for powerful owls can be up to 10 times greater relative to their body weight than the mean prey weight of similarly sized northern owls, such as great grey or great horned owls.

The most largely taken prey species in many regions are adults of common ringtail possum (Pseudocheirus peregrinus) which can weigh around 700 g (1.5 lb). Larger common brushtail possums (Trichosurus vulpecula) of all ages can be taken, but young specimens are preferred since they are abundant in spring and easier to catch than adults around 3,500 g (7.7 lb) in weight. On some occasions, they even take both young and adults of mountain brushtail possums (Trichosurus cunninghami) which can grow about 4,000 g (8.8 lb). Aside from possums, smaller sugar gliders, weighing 80 to 170 g (2.8 to 6.0 oz) and much larger greater glider, which are the same size of ringtail possums, can also be the most prominent prey species in the powerful owl's diet in many regions.

Not infrequently taken are the black (Pteropus alecto) and grey-headed flying foxes (Pteropus poliocephalus), the largest of Australian bats, although smaller bats have also been killed. Introduced mammals, namely rats (Rattus spp.), European hare (Lepus europaeus), and European rabbits (Oryctolagus cuniculus), especially the abundant young of the latter after their litters disperse, are also hunted. Opportunistic as are most predators and owls, given the chance the powerful owl will also prey on nocturnal birds such as the tawny frogmouth (Podargus strigoides). Roosting diurnal birds are also taken such as various cockatoos and parrots (around a dozen species thus far recorded), Australian brushturkey (Alectura lathami), dusky moorhen (Gallinula tenebrosa), white-faced herons (Egretta novaehollandiae), crested pigeon (Ocyphaps lophotes), wonga pigeon (Leucosarcia melanoleuca), kookaburras (Dacelo spp.), superb lyrebird (Menura novaehollandiae), olive-backed oriole (Oriolus sagittatus), Australian magpie (Gymnorhina tibicen), currawongs (Strepera spp.), honeyeaters (Meliphagidae), crows and ravens (Corvus spp.) and white-winged choughs (Corcorax melanorhamphos). In one study, the most frequently killed bird prey species were pied currawong (Strepera graculina) and crimson rosella (Platycercus elegans) and avian prey taken as a whole was estimated to average 350 g (12 oz). Rarely, other birds of prey have been killed and eaten, including large accipiters such as brown goshawks (Accipiter fasciatus) and grey goshawks (Accipiter novaehollandiae). Insects (such as crickets and beetles) and crayfish may supplement the diet and are typically taken on the wing. Rarely, lizards and snakes are also captured. It is also known to scavenge on carrion from time to time.

The vast majority of prey is taken from trees, often in or near the tree canopy, including unlikely items such as rock-wallabies (Petrogale spp.) that sometimes take refuge in trees. This species generally glide from perch to perch, watching for prey activity in surrounding trees until potential prey is detected. If the prey becomes aware of the owl too soon, a tail-chase may ensue, but many prey species (even diurnal ones such as large passerines) can successfully evade the large predator. Due to the size and power of its talons, death may be instantaneous even for large prey when the owl embeds its talons; however, some prey can still survive even after initial contact if they can escape before the owl makes its "killing grip". Powerful owls frequently take apart prey and consume it piecemeal. At daytime perches, it occasionally wakes to consume food until leaving the roost in the evening. The three largest Ninox owls are the only owls known to exhibit the behaviour of mantling over food while roosting during the day. One theory is that the male regularly holds onto the prey during the day, and thus can control the distribution of food to the family in keeping with his dominant size; whereas in most owls, females are larger and more dominant, and thus the male could not display such behaviour as keeping food from his larger mate. Caching of part-eaten prey remains has been recorded, although caching of prey is a far more common behaviour in barking owls. In a study comparing their diets with those of co-existing greater sooty owls (Tyto tenebricosa) and Australian masked owls (Tyto novaehollandiae), these two smaller owls focused on smaller prey on average and ate more small terrestrial mammalian prey rather than the arboreal mammalian prey favored most exclusively by the powerful owl. However, some overlap in the diet was recorded between all three species, and a certain level of competition was predicted, in which the powerful owl would presumably be dominant.

=== Breeding ===
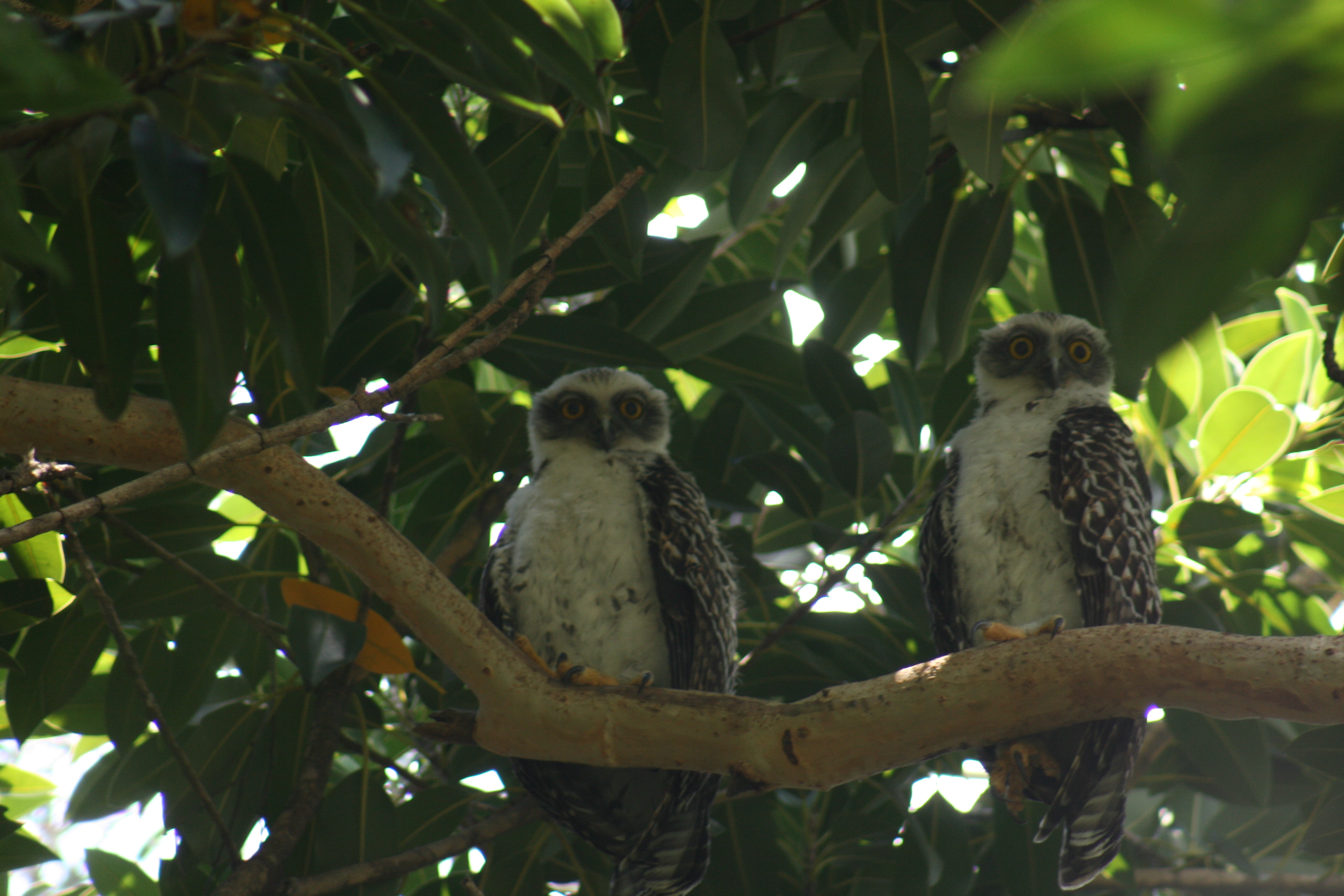
The young of the powerful owl leave the nest a few weeks after hatching but frequently are cared for over several months after dispersing from the nest.

The powerful owl breeds in the Australian winter, with breeding occurring mainly in May and June and brooding at the nest into September. The breeding behaviour of powerful and rufous owls appears to be highly similar. The breeding territory of powerful owls is large. Even when food is abundant, territories are at least 800 to 1,000 ha (2,000 to 2,500 acres). When food is scarce, territories tend to be larger. Typically, nests of breeding pairs are found from 5 to 20 km (3.1 to 12.4 mi) apart. Males have been recorded fighting over breeding rights to females and territories. The nest is most often a large hollow in a tree. Nests have been recorded at 8 to 30 m (26 to 98 ft) above the ground but are most often at least 10 to 15 m (33 to 49 ft) high. The nesting material includes decaying debris and leaf litter. Eggs are oval and dull white. The clutch is most often two, but occasionally includes only one egg, and rarely three are laid. The egg averages about 54 mm × 45 mm (2.1 in × 1.8 in). The eggs are typically laid directly on the rotten wooden floor of the nesting cavity; owls do not build a nest. Egg-laying intervals are up to 4 days between the first and second egg, an unusually long interval for an owl. The female appears to do all incubation and the incubating stage is 36 to 38 days. The male does all hunting and sometimes aggressively defends the nesting during the brooding stage. In other owls that show aggression towards humans during nesting, the female usually is the main aggressor, although in other owls the females are larger with stronger strikes, whereas in the powerful owl, the males are the larger and more powerful sex. Occasionally, females may abandon their nest if disturbed. In general, the slightly smaller rufous and notably smaller barking owl both display more frequent and more spiritedly aggressive nest defense than the powerful owl does. Young powerful owls are mostly off-white with a greyish-brown mask and grey on the wings and coverts, and are obviously distinct from the adult plumage. The young fledge at 6 to 8 weeks. However, the young typically accompany and are fed by their parents for several months, even into the stage that they can fly well. The total dependence period usually lasts 5 to 9 months before independence, and sometimes into the next breeding season. Although practically no predators of this species exist, except in very rare, anecdotal instances, wedge-tailed eagles (Aquila rapax), and powerful owls have been recorded killing each other in territorial and breeding skirmishes. Also, they are often victim to and occasionally even injured by heavy mobbing by larger passerines such as currawongs, magpies, and crows and ravens. In one case, a pair of Australian ravens (Corvus coronoides) attacked and killed a powerful owl, likely to defend themselves and their nest.

== Conservation status ==
Female and fledgling, Mount Coot-tha, Brisbane

Powerful owls are not listed as threatened on the Australian Environment Protection and Biodiversity Conservation Act 1999. However, their conservation status varies from state to state in Australia. For example:

- The powerful owl is listed as "threatened" on the Victorian Flora and Fauna Guarantee Act (1988). Under this Act, an Action Statement for the recovery and future management of this species has been prepared.
- On the 2013 advisory list of threatened vertebrate fauna in Victoria, the powerful owl is listed as vulnerable.
- On the New South Wales Threatened Species Conservation Act 1995, the powerful owl is scheduled as "vulnerable".

These owls do not do as well in heavily developed areas or in monocultures even if the plantation is made up of a native tree. This is largely because its prey is dependent on native and diverse forests.

== In popular culture ==
The Big Powerful Owl is an 8 m (26 ft) sculpture of a powerful owl in the Canberra suburb of Belconnen.
