= Utixo =

Utixo or Tiqua Is a God of the Khoi (the native pastoralist people of Southwestern Africa).

Utixo was a benevolent deity who lived in the sky, sending rain for the crops, and speaking with thunder. Utixo is sometimes translated as wounded knee.

One story that has survived in Christian literature, was that Utixo sent a message to his people that death would not be eternal. He used a rabbit to carry the message. The rabbit became confused, reversed the message, and ended up telling men that they would not rise again.

Utixo was the word that missionaries used for translating God into Khoikhoi. The Zulus call the God UNkulunkulu, the Great One, and uMvelinqangi, the one was before all were.

== See also ==
- Khoikhoi mythology
