= Atua I Kafika =

In the mythology of Tikopia, the Atua I Kafika (also known as Sako) is a cultural hero and supreme god.
