= Tzacol =

Mayan sky god and creator deity

In Maya mythology, Tzacol or Tzakol was a sky god and one of the creator deities.

Tzacol participated in the last two attempts at creating humanity.
