= Binbeal =

God of rainbows in Australian Aboriginal religion and mythology

In Australian Aboriginal religion and mythology, Binbeal is a spirit associated with rainbows. He is a son of Bunjil.
