= Xamaba =

African deity

Xamaba is a god of the Heikum people of South Africa. Said to be the creator of all things, including humanity, he is seen as a benevolent figure who is invoked for help when ill and when traveling and is said to provide the rain.
