= Bunjil =

Creator deity, culture hero and ancestral being in Australian Aboriginal mythology

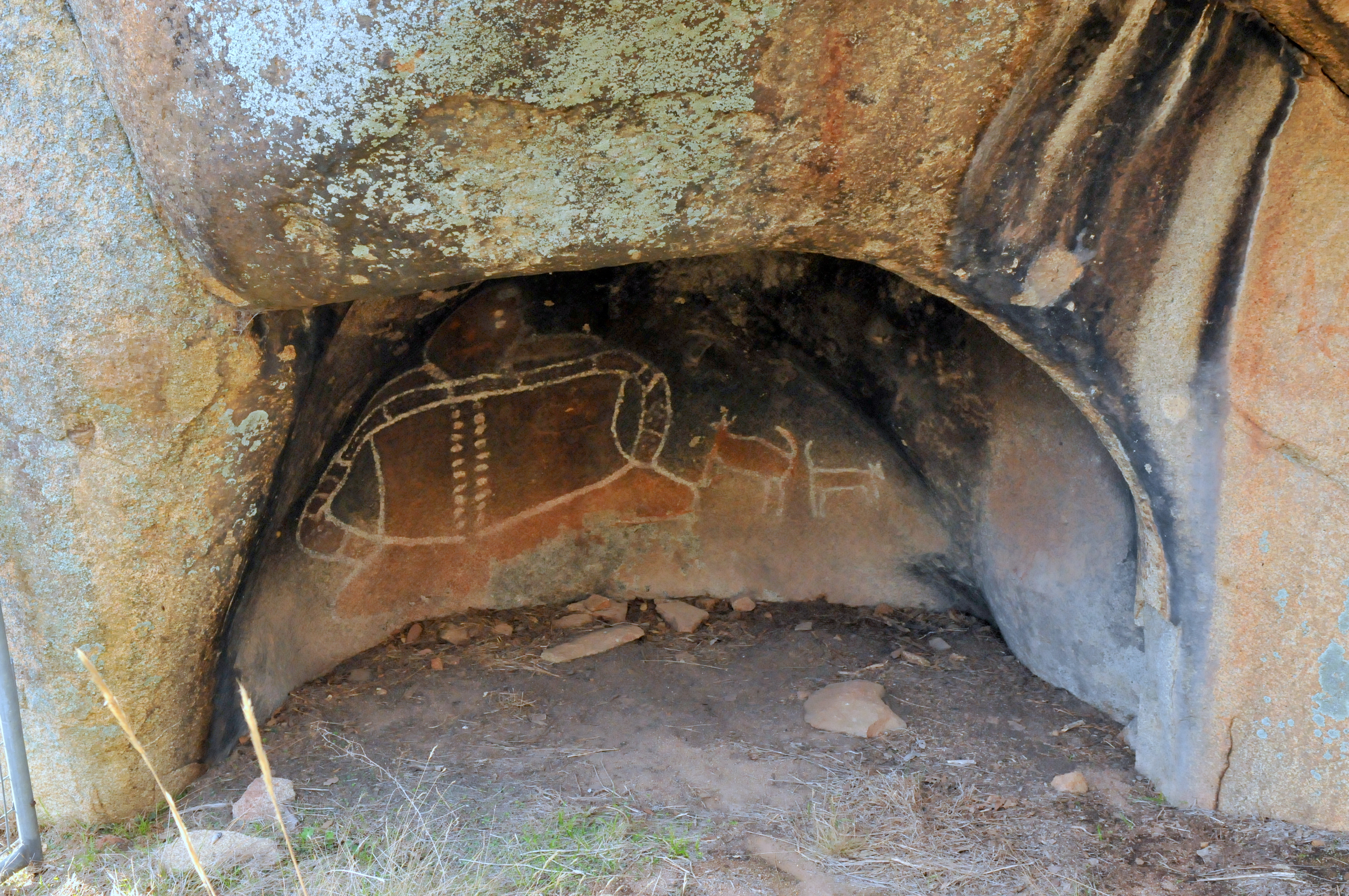
Bunjil's Shelter

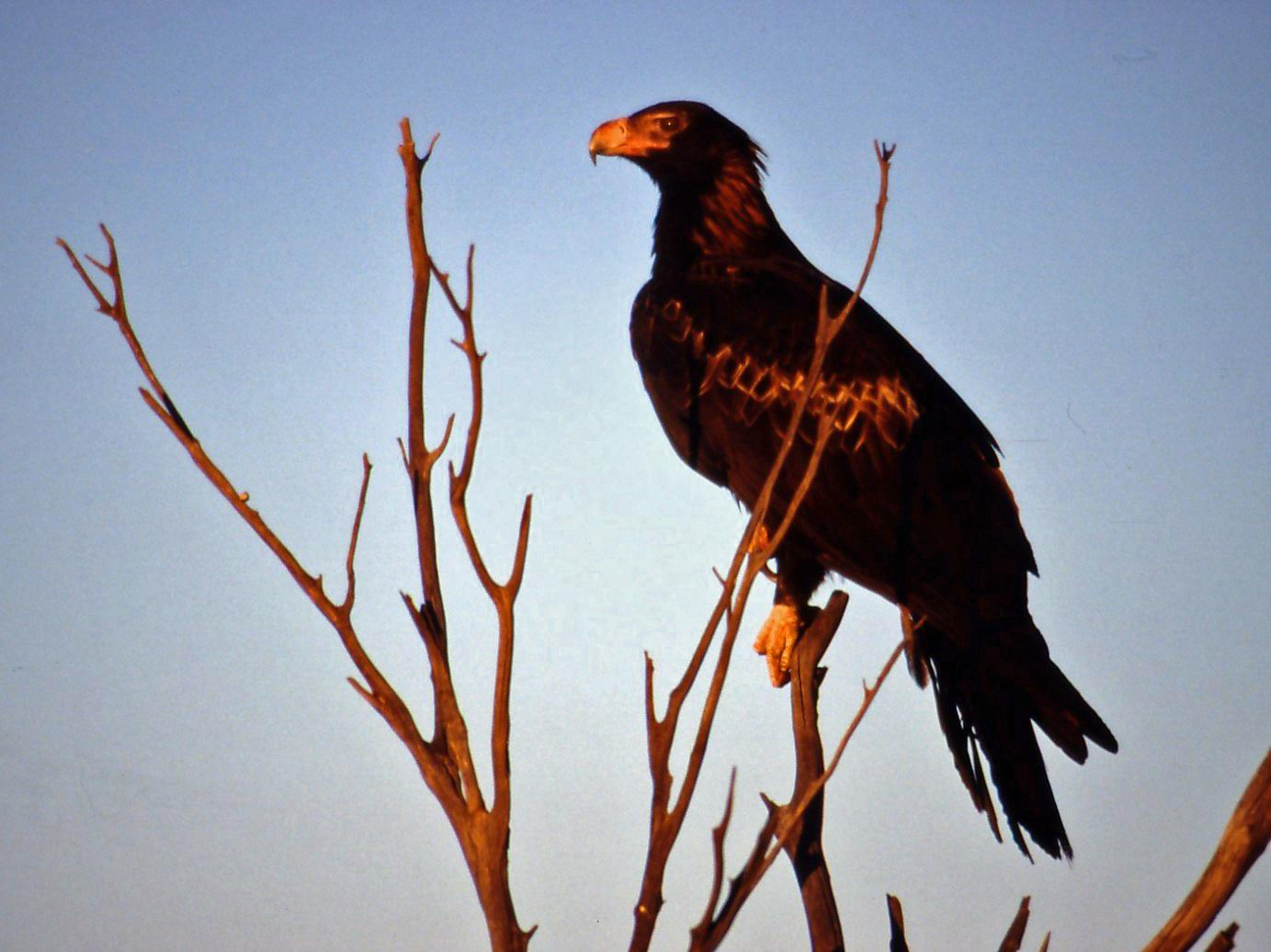
The wedge-tailed eagle is the largest bird of prey in Australia

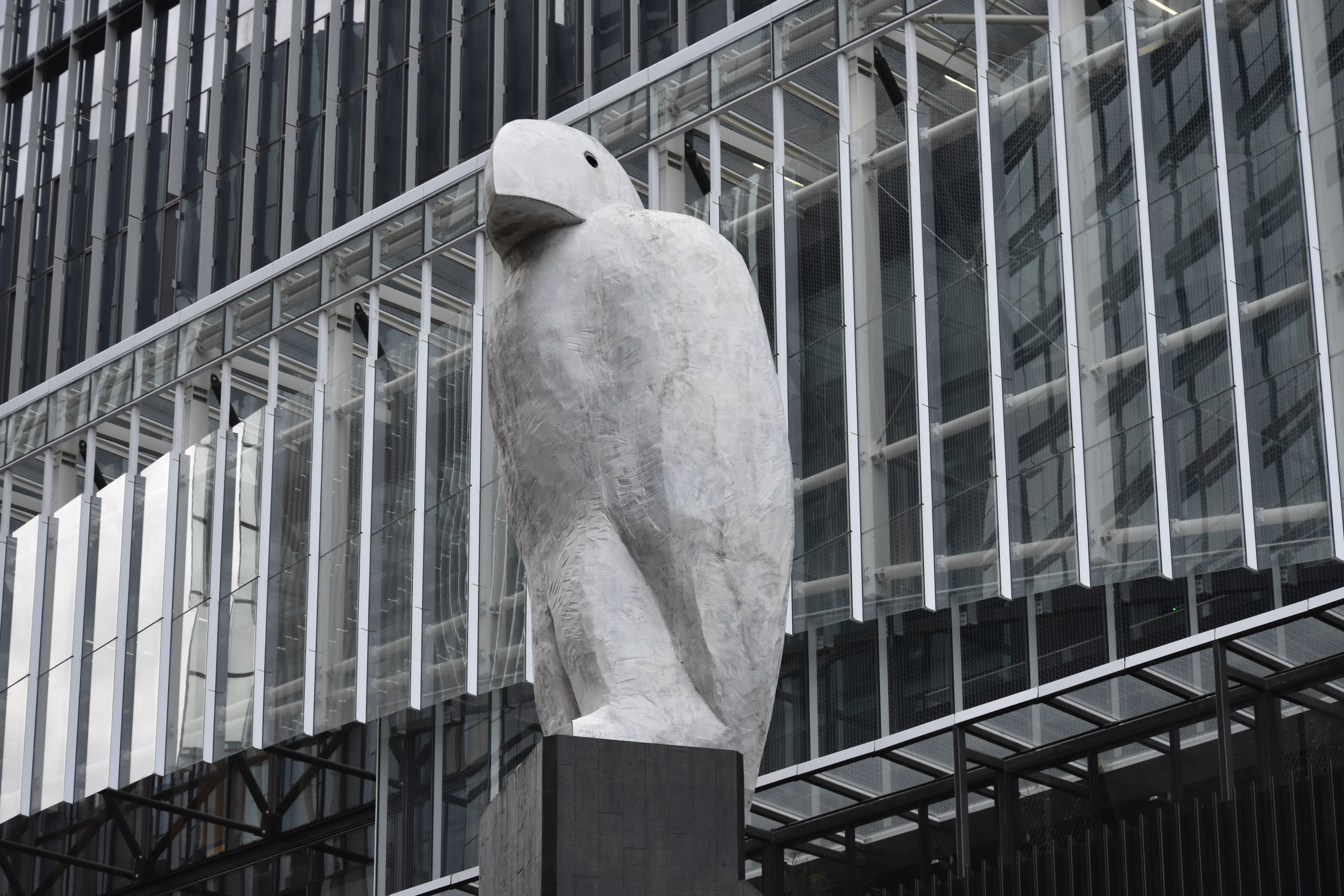
Eagle is a 23-metre tall sculpture by Bruce Armstrong, inspired by Bunjil.

Bunjil, also spelt Bundjil /buɲɟil/ BOON-jil, is a creator deity, culture hero and ancestral being, often depicted as a wedge-tailed eagle in Australian Aboriginal mythology of some of the Aboriginal peoples of Victoria.

== Creation stories ==
In the Kulin nation in central Victoria he was regarded as one of two moiety ancestors, the other being Waang the crow. Bunjil (or Bundjil) has two wives and a son, Binbeal the rainbow. His brother is Palian the bat. He is assisted by six wirmums or shamans who represent the clans of the Eaglehawk moiety: Djart-djart the nankeen kestrel, Thara the quail hawk, Yukope the parakeet, Lar-guk the parrot, Walert the brushtail possum and Yurran the gliding possum.

A Boonwurrung story tells of a time of conflict among the Kulin nations, when people argued and fought with one another, neglecting their families and the land. The mounting chaos and disunity angered the sea, which began to rise until it had covered the plains and threatened to flood the entire country. The people went to Bunjil and asked him to help them stop the sea from rising; Bunjil agreed to do so, but only if the people would change their ways and respect the laws and each other. He then walked out to the sea, raised his spear and ordered the water to stop rising.

According to one legend, after creating the mountains, rivers, flora, fauna, and laws for humans to live by, Bunjil gathered his wives and sons then asked Waang, who had charge of the winds, to open his bags and let out some wind. Waang opened a bag in which he kept his whirlwinds, creating a cyclone which uprooted trees. Bunjil asked for a stronger wind. Waang complied, and Bunjil and his people were blown upwards into the sky. Bunjil himself became the star Altair and his two wives, the black swans, became stars on either side. Bunjil was said to have left this world via the island of Deen Maar.

== Bunjil's Shelter ==
It is believed by the Kulin and other Aboriginal peoples that, in the Dreamtime, Bunjil took shelter in a cave located in the part of Gariwerd that is now known as the Black Range Scenic Reserve, not far from Stawell. Bunjil's Shelter is today a popular tourist attraction and one of the most important Aboriginal rock art sites in the region.

== Alternative spellings ==
Early European colonists such as Daniel Bunce recorded the name as "Winjeel" or "Wingeel", possibly from dialectal differences between the closely related Woiwurrung, Boonwurrung and Wathaurong languages. These spellings have persisted in the name of the farming area of Wingeel near Geelong, and in that of the CAC Winjeel aircraft.

In other sources, the name may be recorded as Pundjel, Bunjel, Pundjil, Punjel, Pun-Gel, Bun-Gil, or Pundgel.
