= Amai-te-rangi =

According to the mythology of the Cook Islands, Amai-te-rangi was a cannibal and demon who attempted to entrap Ngaru. Ngaru, however, ascended and defeated Amai-te-rangi with the help of his grandfather, Mokoroa.
