= Abenaki mythology =

The Abenaki people are an indigenous peoples of the Americas located in the Northeastern Woodlands region. Their religious beliefs are part of the great Midewiwin tradition, with ceremonies led by medicine keepers, called Medeoulin or Mdawinno.

== Creation Of The Abenaki ==
In Abenaki mythology the highest deity is Gici Niwaskw, also referred to by the titles of Tabaldak or Dabaldak, meaning Lord, and Niwaskowôgan, meaning Great Spirit. According to the creation myth, there existed no sound or color prior until Gici Niwaskw desired it and began the process of creating the world. To do so he called forth a giant turtle, called Tolba, from the primordial waters, crafting the land on top of Tolba's shell and the clouds above that. After this creation the Great Spirit fell asleep and began to dream of every creature and plant to ever exist, waking to discover that his dreams had become reality as he had slept. Thus the newly created world was populated by living things.

=== Gluskab and The Transition Between The Ages ===
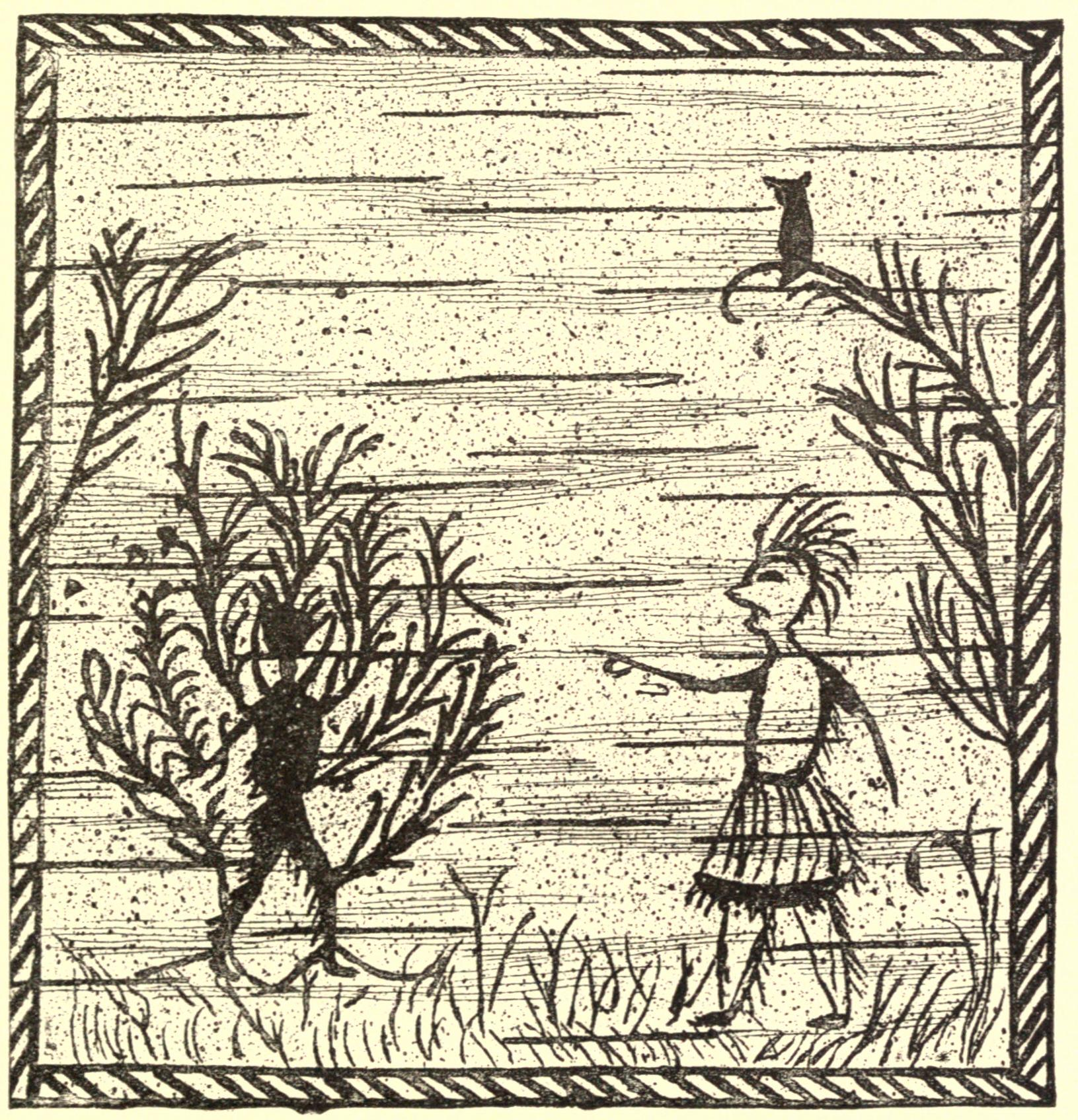
Gluskab turning a man into a cedar tree (scraping on birchbark by Tomah Joseph 1884)

The main character noted for being responsible for the care of Gici Niwaskw's creations and the transition between the three ages is Gluskab, known by different names such as Glooscap, Glooskap, Gluskabe, and Klooskomba throughout the various Abenaki branch tribes. While not a full deity within the mythology Gluskab is characterized as a being with supernatural powers who uses them to make life easier for humankind while maintaining a fondness for trickery and playing pranks on people.

One of Gluskab's many feats was tricking the great eagle Pamola, who creates wind by beating his wings, to allow him to tie his wings, and freeing them once the eagle promised to only cause storms sometimes. Gluskab is also credited with shrinking beavers to their modern size, as during the Ancient Age they were larger than humans. He did this by petting them on their heads, and with each pet, he used his magic to cause them to grow smaller and smaller. The most common tale was of Gluskab turning the syrup within maple trees to sap. Initially, syrup could be found directly in maple trees, so the humans sat under the trees all day and let the sweet treat drip directly into their mouths, leaving the fields untended and homes unkempt. Gluskab poured water into the maple trees to dilute the syrup, which meant that humans could no longer have maple syrup without collecting it and boiling it down for much less than they had gathered. Thus Gluskab ensured humans would not grow lazy in their lives.

In some versions of his story, Gluskab is noted as being the twin of Malsum or Malsumis, a more malevolent being that seeks to make life harder for humans rather than easier. However, there is some doubt of whether this version actually comes from Abenaki mythology or if it is a misattributed Iroquois tale, as there exists only one known source for it within the Abenaki tribes and no wider knowledge of it within them.

== Three Ages ==
Since the creation, it is believed by the Abenaki that the world has gone through three separate ages, defined by humanity and its relationship with the other animals. First, there is the Ancient Age, where humans and animals are viewed as equal, followed by the Golden Age, where humans begin to separate themselves from being like the other animals. Finally, there is the Present Age, which is marked by the current status of humans being completely separate from the rest of the animals.

=== Beings of the Ancient Age ===
- Atosis - a medeoulin who is a reptilian humanoid, forces people to find a stick so that he can cook them with it, was blinded by Moosbas
- Azeban - "Raccoon", a raccoon or wolverine trickster spirit
- Kee-wakw - a gigantic, forest-dwelling cannibal
- Kisosen - "Sun-Bringer", the solar deity, an eagle whose wings opened to create the day, and closed to cause the nighttime
- Kita-skog "Big Snake" or Pita-skog "Grand Snake" - a Horned Serpent who fights the Pa-don-gi-ak
- Kchi-awasos - "Big Bear", the bowl stars of the Big Dipper are the Great Bear, who is chased every night by three hunters; he is killed every fall and his blood drips to earth turning the leaves brown while the constellation turns upside down; it is righted, and he is reborn, every spring
- Mateguas (also Mat-gwas) - a rabbit spirit, first (one of magic) the rabbit, the first medeoulin, legendary founder of the Midewiwin.
- Metee-kolen-ol - a race of evil wizards with hearts of ice
- Nanom-keea-po-da - subterranean spirit who causes earthquakes
- Niben - "Summer", a woman whose stunning beauty forces Pe-ben to retreat to the north; she represents summer
- Pamola - a bird and night spirit who takes prisoners to Alomkik, near Mt. Katahdin and causes cold weather
- Psônen "Snow-Bringer" - an eagle-spirit that makes snow by opening his wings
- Padôgiyik "Thunders" - seven white-skinned, golden-haired brothers, half-human and half-bird, former inhabitants of Lake Champlain, war-like, thunder and lightning spirits.
- Pebon "Winter" - a powerful sorcerer who puts his audience to sleep when he tells stories, spirit of winter
- Siguan "Spring" - a young male who loved the season of summer, and brought her to the north every spring
- Tabaldak "Owner" - the androgynous creator of existence
- Wa-won-dee-a-megw "Snail" - a snail spirit that can live in trees, on land or in the water, as well as change size and appearance to look like a huge snake, alligator or scaly man; has horns which can be ground into a magical powder
- Wad-zoo-sen - the eagle that flaps his wings to create wind. Gluskab tries to stop his wind in order to hunt by tying his wings and moving him, but realizes that without the wind, the earth and water will suffer and releases him enough to allow some wind.
- Wassan-mon-ganeehla-ak - a race of people who play games with a ball of light, causing the Aurora Borealis

=== Beings of the Golden Age ===
- Oodzee-hozo (Odzihózo) also known as Gluskab/Gluskabe (Gloos Ka Be) - ("the man who created himself") a man who lived before the invention of legs. He dragged his body around, creating mountains, valleys and rivers (in this early form, he is referred to as Bemee-geedzin-pobi-zeed), as well as Lake Champlain, which is holy to the Abenaki. Odzihozo turned himself into a rock in the lake (Rock Dunder, roughly 1.4 miles (2.3 km) west of Burlington, Vermont), which he is said to inhabit.
- Tool-ba (Tôlba) - foolish turtle spirit, uncle of Gluskab
- Pla-ween-noo - turtle spirit, mother of Gluskab, patron spirit of the Sokwakis
- Agaskw (also Nokemis) - ("woodchuck", also known as Nokomis, "my grandmother") is a very wise woodchuck-spirit of the Abenaki. She is the grandmother of Gluskab.
- Moos-bas - mink spirit, adopted son of Gluskab, powerful fletcher, sometimes fulfills wishes
- Mool-sem - one of Gluskab's dogs, the white one, could shrink or enlarge himself
- M-da-weelh-ak - a loon spirit in the form of a dog, Gluskab's messenger, one of his dogs, the black one, could shrink or enlarge himself
- A-senee-ki-wakw - a race of stone giants, the first people Gluskab created but then destroyed because they crushed other animals and injured the earth with their great size

=== Beings of the Present Age ===
- Alom-bag-winno-sis or Alom-begwi-no-sis - a mischievous, dwarfish race of men upsets canoes, that can increase or decrease body size at will; they also own a pot which can transform a few kernels of maize into a huge quantity; seeing one supposedly foretells a death by drowning
- Ask-wee-da-eed - a fire-elemental, identified as a will o' the wisp, that brings bad luck and death, also connected with comets and meteors
- Atsolowas - a trickster.
- Awa-hon-do z - insect spirits that bite humans
- Awes-kon-wa - a small, flying sprite, associated with the Mohawk tribe
- Batsolowanagwes - a benign trickster
- Bedig-wajo (western Abenaki) or Ktaden (eastern Abenaki) - a culture hero
- Chibaiskweda - marsh gas, supposedly caused by the ghost of an improperly buried corpse
- Do-gakw-ho-wad - small men who prop the jaws of animals open with sticks in order to avoid being eaten
- Dzee-dzee-bon-da - a monster, so ugly that even he is terrified of his own appearance
- Ko-gok - another monster
- Lo-lol - a frightening monster
- M-ska-gwe-demoos - a swamp-dwelling woman, dressed in moss with moss for hair; she cries alone in the forest and is potentially dangerous
- Maski-mon-gwe-zo-os - a toad creature, seduces men and children and kills them, appears either as a partridge or a woman dressed in moss, with a belt made of arborvitae bark
- Meek-moos-ak - a pair of short twins who seduce women, who are then cursed to never desire marriage, kills hunters during the winter, possibly a personification of the Mi'kmaq tribe
- N-dam-keno-wet - a half-fish, half-human creature with a small face and long hair, molests bathing women
- P-skig-demo-os - a female creature, slays men and children
- Pak-zin-skwa - an ugly, old woman
- Pim-skwa-wagen-owad - small, aquatic, pinching creatures
- Pok-wejee-men - small creatures, created from the bark of the ash tree
- Tsa-tsamolee-as - the noisy, clownish fool
- Tsi-noo - a person whose heart is made of ice and has no soul; he eats the souls of others for sustenance and strength. See also the Chenoo.
- Wana-games-ak - river-dwelling creatures with faces so narrow, they are essentially two-dimensional, friendly creatures that warned the Abenaki of coming attacks
