= Nokomis (disambiguation) =

Nokomis is a character in Ojibwe traditional stories.

Nokomis may also refer to:

== Places ==
=== Canada ===
- Nokomis, Saskatchewan, Canada

=== United States ===
- Nokomis, Alabama
- Nokomis, Florida
- Nokomis, Illinois
- Nokomis, Minneapolis, Minnesota, a neighborhood
- Lake Nokomis, Minnesota
- Nokomis, Virginia
- Nokomis, Wisconsin

== Other ==
- USS Nokomis, two ships with the name
