= Jiibayaabooz =

Figure in Ojibwe and Abenaki mythology

Jiibayaabooz (in syllabics: ᒋᐸᔮᐴᔅ) is a figure in Ojibwe mythology, also known as Chipiapoos or Cheeby-aub-oozoo, meaning "Spirit Rabbit" or "Ghost of Rabbit". The figure also appears in Abenaki mythology Mateguas, meaning "Rabbit". This figure is a trickster spirit and figures prominently in their storytelling, including the story of the world's creation. Depending on the tradition, he was either the second or third son^{:37} of Wiininwaa ("Nourishment"), (Note: The Anishinaabeg give the mother's name as "nourishment", but Schoolcraft suggests the name is from the Dakota Winona ("first-born daughter").) a human mother, and E-bangishimog ("In the West"), a spirit father.

Stories regarding Jiibayaabooz are filled with all things mystical and spiritual. While alive, Jiibayaabooz was obsessed with manitous and humans' interaction with each other. Through his regular communication with the manitous through dreams, he taught humans the importance of dreams and the methods of communication with the manitou. As with any little brother, he was subjected to his elder brother Majiikiwis's taunts. However, Majiikiwis actions went further, as Jiibayaabooz died as a result of a dare from his elder brother.

Even in death, his jiibay ("Ghost") continued with obsession with the manitous and taught the humans the rites and ceremonies of vision quests and purification ceremonies. Basil Johnston also adds that Jiibayaabooz became the "Chief of the Underworld" and "bequeathed the spirit of music, chants, and poetry to the Anishinaubae peoples."^{:49}

Among the Abenakis, Mateguas from the dead taught his living brother Gluskab the rites and ceremonies of vision quests and purification ceremonies to comfort his grieving brother. This became the core of the Midewiwin rituals that Gluskab then passed on to the humans.
