= Pamola =

Bird spirit in Abenaki mythology

Pamola (also styled Pamolai, P-mol-a, Pomola, (Note: Thus spelt by Thoreau.) Bmola, and Bumole,) is a legendary bird spirit and thunder god that appears in Abenaki mythology, specifically Penobscot folklore. It is the protector of Katahdin, the tallest mountain in Maine, held sacred by these natives.

== General description ==
Specifically, according to the Penobscot tribal nation, Pamola inhabited Katahdin, the tallest mountain in Maine, having been banished there by the supreme deity Gluskab.

Pamola is said to be a Storm Bird and thunder god and protector of the mountain. The Penobscot people generally describe him as having the head of a moose, the body of a man and the wings and feet of an eagle. (Note: Cf. illustration by Jane Thomas on the front cover of Dudley (2013).) Alternately Pamola has been described as having a human face as large as four horses but otherwise eagle-like in form. (Note: Fobes (1962), p. 528 apud Shipley (2016), p. 754b.) Pamola was both feared and respected by the Penobscot nation, and his presence was one of the main reasons that climbing the mountain was considered taboo.

Pamola is said to carry off humans to Alomkik (i.e., Hell (Note: Alomkik designates hell (l'enfer) in the Passamaquoddy language.)) near to the mountain. This spirit is associated with cold wet weather, specifically night, wind, storms, snow, and dense fog.

The story of Pamola's consignment to the mountain is told rather differently in the scheme of the wider Algonquian creation myth; i.e., that the creator god Tabaldak had placed the bird on the mountain, and then the transformer god Gluskab visited it and tasked it with the duty of flapping its wings to produce bad weather, intended to curb the human hunting activity considered to overpressure the ecosystem if left unabated.

The spirit resented mortals intruding from down below. Because of this, the mountain was closed off limits to all below. Henry David Thoreau, of his August, 1846 exploration of the Penobscot River and Katahdin wrote, "Pomola is always angry with those who climb to the summit of Ktaadn".

The name is now preserved on Pamola Peak, the tallest summit on Katahdin at the eastern edge of the Knife Edge ridge. The Pamola Lodge of the Order of the Arrow is an honor camping society of the Boy Scouts of America; Pamola's image is commonly used on several of the society's insignia.

== Tales and storytellers ==
Roy Dudley (Leroy Dudley, d. 1946), early ranger at the Baxter State Park and first ranger at the Chimney Pond campsite on mount Katahdin, was known for his campfire yarns about Pamola. His stories include ones of his own encounters with Pamola during the 1920s and 1930s; he professed that at one time, Pamola deemed him to be a trespasser and swooped down at him but he had refused to budge; in another occurrence, while attempting to draw water from Chimney Pond he got splashed and soaked due to Pamola hurling boulders into the water urging him to leave. (Note: Dudley tells an anecdote of Pamola splashing him while paddling by on a raft on the pond. In another tale, a certain "fat man" disobeyed the sign that forbade bathing in the pond, and Pamola angrily sucked up all the water using a hose-like implement. Boulder falls also feature in Pamola tales, e.g., using a rake to tumble them down, clearing and flattening the landscape so even a baby carriage can travel. Pamola also used his magical dust broom to gather up all the water Chimney Pond into a sphere, and used the broom to transport all that water to Basin Pond 1.5 miles away, forcing Dudley to travel that far to draw water, for two weeks.) Dudley also claims there was a contest between Pamola and Dungarvon Whooper over supremacy in the domain of Katahdin.

Another storyteller, Arnie Neptune tells the story of how his ancestor John Neptune spending the night in a cave to fend off Bumole's (Pamola's) intrusion. (Note: Maine Filmmaker Huey had footage material on Roy Dudley but edited him out of the film, considering the Neptune story to ring true in comparison.) (Note: Cf. Dudley (2013), p. xvi on tale of Neptune's survival inside a small cabin with the door frozen shut.)
