= Malsumis =

Figure in Algonquin mythology

Malsumis (sometimes Malsum or Malsom) is thought by some to be the highly malevolent spirit or god of chaos in Abenaki mythology, an Algonquian people of northeastern North America. Some Wabanaki believe that he is not Gluskab's brother at all, or agree that he was not evil.

== Mythology ==
According to legend, after Tabaldak created humans, the dust from his hand created Gluskab and some versions say that he also created Gluskab's twin brother, Malsumis.

Tabaldak gave Gluskab the power to create a good world. Malsumis, on the other hand, did the opposite, and still seeks evil to this day. While he and Gluskab both had the power to do good, Malsumis used his power for evil and trickery, like putting thorns on plants. Gluskab protects man, but Malsumis uses his power to plot the end of man to this very day.

Malsumis is sometimes associated with wolves, but many Wabanaki claim that this is not true. They are also unsure if he is even a real figure or if folklorists have confused him with other Abenaki spirits.

The most widely-circulated version of Malsumis and his brother Gluskab can be credited to Charles Leland. The origins of the rendition itself and its legitimacy have been debated.

A passage of note that highlights discrepancies between popularized and arguably authentic versions of this myth:

Now the great lord Glooskap, who was worshiped in after-days by all the Wabanaki, or children of light, was a twin with a brother. As he was good, this brother, whose name was Malsumsis, or Wolf the younger, was bad. Before they were born, the babes consulted to consider how they had best enter the world. And Glooskap said, "I will be born as others are." But the evil Malsumsis thought himself too great to be brought forth in such a manner, and declared that he would burst through his mother's side.

As compared to an account offered by Gabriel Acquin—one of the two Maliseet sources that Leland had at the time he wrote his rendition of the Gluskap-Malsumis story—Leland's makes a concerted effort to paint Malsumis as explicitly malicious. The two accounts of the Maliseet storytellers do not call "the twin [Malsumis] 'wicked' or 'evil'." Nor do either of the Maliseet sources make Malsumis into a wolf; in fact, the wolf is portrayed as a sympathetic character who mourns Gluskab.
