= Monster in My Pocket =

- Created by: Morrison Entertainment Group
- Years: 1990–

Monster in My Pocket is a media franchise developed by American company Morrison Entertainment Group, headed by Joe Morrison and John Weems, two former senior executives at Mattel.

The focus is on monsters and fantastical and legendary creatures from religion, mythology, folklore, fairy tales, literary fantasy, science fiction, cryptids and other anomalous phenomena. Monster in My Pocket produced trading cards, comic books, books, toys, a board game, a video game, and an animated special, along with music, clothing, kites, stickers, and various other items.

== Toys ==
=== Figures ===
Monster in My Pocket was best known as a toy-line released by Matchbox in 1990. It consists of small, soft plastic figures representing monsters, and later other tangentially related characters.

In its first run, there were 11 series released. There were over 200 monsters in the collection, most of which were assigned a point value. Among the highest valued monsters were the Tyrannosaurus Rex, Griffin, Great Beast, Behemoth, Hydra, Werewolf (25 points) and among the least being Charon, The Invisible Man, and The Witch (5 points). Initially, the high point value was 25, which was elevated to 30 for the second and third series; the fourth, "Super Scary", series introduced the 50-100 point monsters. The toys were initially solid-colored, though later series would gradually add more painted colors, until they became fully colored under the auspices of new toy makers Corinthian Marketing and Vivid Imaginations.

The lines ran into difficulty in the Hindu communities, as the divinities Kālī, Ganesha, Hanuman, and Yama, were all depicted as "monsters", which included a public outcry by the Vishva Hindu Parishad. After the fourth series, which contained Hanuman (who was removed from the UK run) and Yama, they decided to play it safe and provided follow-up series: Super Creepies, 24 comical (punning) aberrations of real insects and arachnids created by "Dr. Zechariah Wolfram" with point values up to 200: 24 Dinosaurs, released in both regular and "Secret Skeleton" format; and 16 Space Aliens that were essentially original. The point values increased even further, up to 500. A second series of dinosaurs is rarer than series 3, and included only four premium figures released with confectionery, numbered #223 to #226. In some markets, such as Argentina, the dinosaurs were released as Dinosaur in My Pocket. Many of these were not released outside of Europe. The Dinosaurs appear to have been released in the U.S. only through premium distribution by Hardee's, and these were not the standard figures that were sold in stores.

They were mainly yellow, green, orange and red but monsters with more than 30 points had more than just one color. Other toys included Super Scary Howlers representing Vampire, The Monster, Swamp Beast, and Werewolf, a Monster Mountain display case with custom labels for series 1, a Monster Pouch fanny pack, Battle Cards featuring The Beast and Witch, and a Haunted House playset, which was never released, although it was shown at Toy Fair 1992.

=== Board game ===
A board game was also released by Decipher Limited, which used the action figures as playing pieces. The game involved using the monsters to fight battles in terrains where they had different strengths—New York, Tundra, Volcano, and Swamp.

=== Monster Wrestlers in My Pocket ===
The Monster Wrestlers in My Pocket debuted in the United Kingdom in 1994, no longer produced by Matchbox, but by Corinthian Marketing. The first nine, including Tony the Tiger as a coach, were released in Kellogg's Frosties cereal. The numbering was restarted, the high point value was returned to 100, and the coaches and referees, except for the 100 point "Tony the Coach", were the first monsters designated with 0 points. Forty-five figures were released in total, with six variant figures released as premiums in a White Castle fast food promotion. Frosties also did a twelve-monster series of Monster Sports Stars in My Pocket, including "Tony the Referee", which were made of much harder plastic and had no point values. Seventeen Monster Ninja Warriors in My Pocket were produced in 1996 by Vivid Imaginations, some of which came with vehicles and accessories. These also were the first Monster in My Pocket figures with removable weapons. The figures that were not made by Matchbox were painted in full colors and came in only a few variations, rather than previously coming in multiple solid or tri-tone colors.

=== Relaunches ===
The line was revived in the United Kingdom in 2003, titled Monster in My Pocket: The Quest, with deluxe figures of the principal monster characters and reissues of the series 1-2 monsters essentially unchanged. The toys were made by Corinthian Marketing. Pyramid Marketing was supposed to create an animated series, but it was never completed. "Monster in My Pocket" was divorced from the renamed "Monster Quest" in December 2004.

2006 has seen another relaunch of the series, also by Corinthian Marketing. Unlike 2003 series, this one has been completely revamped. Some of the likenesses are closer to earlier source materials, others, such as Kraken, which now looks more humanoid than like a cephalopod, have been further removed. These figures are in full color and have close to the level of detail one often finds in pewter figurines for role-playing games. Kali and Hanuman returned under the names "6-Armed Sorceress" and "Monkeyman", while Mattoon, Illinois, never embracing the connection, was dropped off Mad Gasser's name. Spectre was renamed Grim Reaper. Although the 2006 relaunch was released as a full set of 48 monsters, only three - Phantom, Ghost and Grim Watcher - were never released to UK markets.

== Known monsters ==
There are at least 229 monsters in the series, though information past #184 is very sketchy. 121-144 are the Super Creepies, 145-168 are Dinosaurs, 169-184 are Space Aliens, and beyond that is a large group of additional dinosaurs. In addition, there are 42 Monster Wrestlers in My Pocket, 12 Monster Sports Stars in My Pocket, and 19 Monster Ninja Warriors in My Pocket, not to mention supporting characters and two relaunches. The Charon and the Charun figures sound alike but they are completely different monsters.

The following legendary monsters are part of the Monster in My Pocket series: except for the Super Scary Series, all of these are included in the Argentine and Mexican sticker books from Cromy with the exception of Bash Tchelik, who is identified in the centerspread of the third issue of the Harvey comic book. Sixteen of these are presumed unreleased as action figures.

Series 1

- Baba Yaga
- The Beast
- Behemoth
- Bigfoot
- Catoblepas
- Cerberus
- Charon
- Chimera
- Coatlicue
- Cockatrice
- Cyclops
- Ghost
- Ghoul
- Goblin
- Great Beast
- Gremlin
- Griffin
- Haniver
- Harpy
- Hobgoblin
- Hunchback
- Hydra
- The Invisible Man
- Jotun Troll (Þrívaldi)
- Kali
- Karnak
- Kraken
- Mad scientist
- Manticore
- Medusa
- Mummy
- The Monster
- Ogre
- The Phantom
- Red Cap
- Roc
- Skeleton
- Spring-heeled Jack
- Tengu
- Triton
- Tyrannosaurus Rex
- Vampire
- Vampiress
- Wendigo
- Werewolf
- Winged Panther
- Witch
- Zombie

Series 2

- Ancient Gorgon
- Bishop Fish
- Bloody Bones
- Dragon
- Dryad
- Ectoplasmic Phantom
- Elbow witch
- Ganesha
- Gargoyle
- Golem
- Herne the Hunter
- Jabberwocky
- Loch Ness Monster
- Merrow
- Minotaur
- Nuckelavee
- Sebek
- Scorpion man
- Spectre
- Swamp Beast
- Tarasque
- Undine
- Warlock
- Ymir

Series 3

- Abominable Snowman
- Amphisbaena
- Anubis
- Blemmyea
- Centaur
- Jimmy Squarefoot
- Leviathan
- Orobas
- Siren

Series 3 unreleased

- Achelous
- Ankou
- Banshee
- Bash Tchelik
- Beast of Gévaudan (Jabalius on Argentine material)
- Catarenha (Guardian of the Gold)
- Djinn Shapeshifter
- Genie
- Grendel
- Hairy Boggart
- The Headless Man
- Hieracosphinx
- Hodag
- Sciapod
- Talus
- Troll

Series 4

- Alu
- Astaroth (Baal in likeness)
- Boogeyman
- Charun
- Creature from the Closet
- Drude
- Dybbuk
- Fachan
- Ghilan
- Grave Watcher
- Hanuman
- Houngan
- Imp
- Jenny Greenteeth
- Jersey Devil
- Lamia
- Mad Gasser of Mattoon
- Poltergeist
- Slaughterford
- Thunderdell
- Umi Bozu
- Wildman of China
- Wurdulac
- Yama

== Monster in My Pocket in other media ==
=== Trading cards ===
The earliest Monster in My Pocket items were trading cards painted by Jan Sheets and Jenice Heo. They appeared in 1989, with no credit other than for the Morrison Entertainment Group. The Sheets/Heo art also appears on a great deal of the other material.

Paintings were made for at least the first three series as well as the Dinosaurs, though only the first was released in the U.S. Cromy of Argentina released all of these, including prismatic chase cards of many of the series 2 and 3 characters. These were also released in a sticker album format, including a series 1 only edition in the U.S. from Panini. Both were accompanied by sketch art depicting cartoons of the characters.

=== Comic books ===
A comic book series written by Dwayne McDuffie (initially working from a plot by Craig Mitchell, R.L. Stern, and Tim Bogart), and drawn primarily by Gil Kane and Ernie Colón (with Nelson Dewey) was released by Harvey Comics in 1991. It ran for four bi-monthly issues, despite an open ending and promises that sales had justified making it monthly.

In this series, a spell by Warlock intended to shrink the monsters who did not side with him was botched by Ogre, resulting in the shrinkage of all the monsters who were then flung, within boxes with roomy interiors, to Los Angeles, California. The good monsters ended up in the home of ne'er-do-well high school student Jack Miles and his studious younger brother, Tom, in Burbank. The series ended with both sides battling inside a dollhouse bought for a little girl named Theresa, who was scared away by Spring-heeled Jack. They also dealt with Frank Rook, The Exterminator (a parody of The Punisher), and Swamp Beast helped them defeat a Tyrannosaurus Rex who would grow when exposed to any form of radiation, such as smoke detectors and microwave ovens.

Beginning with the second issue, Universal Pictures began receiving credit in the indicia for the use of Frankenstein's Monster, Mummy, The Invisible Man, and The Phantom of the Opera, although the characters originated in public domain literature and bore no particular resemblance to their cinematic counterparts at Universal. Marvel Comics reissued the comic stories in newly-formatted annuals, and World Publishing (an imprint of Egmont Publishing) followed by a Monster Wrestlers in My Pocket annual—which had no continuity with the previous series—in 1995, with a cover dated 1996.

Clearly depicted with the evil monsters were Medusa and Spring-Heeled Jack, the two most prominent evil monsters after Warlock, along with Ogre, Cerberus, Minotaur, Windigo, Cyclops, Zombie, Siren, Ymir, Karnak (probably Maahes), Tengu, Bigfoot, Spectre (Grim Reaper), Sebek, Charon, and Ghost, though the evil monsters were most often shown in amorphous crowds. Dr. Jekyll is twice force-fed—first by Warlock, then by The Monster—the potion that makes him into Mr. Hyde, but he turns maverick, not much more willing to support Warlock than Vampire.

The "Sid's Bits" editorial in issue 2 of the comic contains a partial listing of good and evil monsters; included in the evil side is a character identified simply as "The Electronic Monster". There is no known figure in the series bearing that name.

=== Video game ===
Monster in My Pocket (North America and PAL Regions) Batman & Flash (Asia)
- North American box art
- Developer: Konami
- Publishers: NA: Konami; PAL: Palcom
- Programmers: Etsunobu Ebisu; Shiro Murata
- Composers: Hiroshi Takeyasu; Kôzô Nakamura
- Platform: Nintendo Entertainment System
- Release: NA: January 1992; PAL: 1992; AS: 1992
- Genre: Platformer
- Modes: Single-player, multiplayer

A video game was released for the Nintendo Entertainment System in 1992 by Konami. It had the same essential concept of the comic book, although it altered the personalities of Hobgoblin and Gremlin, initially the good monsters but now appeared as villains, to the extent that Gremlin was a boss.

Warlock, wanting to have power and rule over all the other monsters, creates a shrinking spell to use as punishment for any who chooses to oppose him. As time goes on, all of the monsters choose to join his side, except for Vampire and The Monster, but the spell was miscast, causing all of the monsters to shrink in size. Warlock sends out his henchmen, led by Spring-heeled Jack, Bigfoot, Kraken, Gremlin, and Medusa while Vampire and The Monster are watching TV in the Miles home. They must fight their way through the upstairs and kitchen of the home, the street, and the sewer; they emerge in a construction site and an Orientalist garden before fighting Warlock at Monster Mountain, although that is not the end of the game.

Vampire and the Monster's abilities in the game are the same (though 2-player simultaneous action was an option): they can make an attack that can extend slightly beyond their bodies with a bit of a blaze, and they can make a double jump from the height of their jump, something that has since become a common move in many video games.

The remaining good monsters from the comics—Werewolf, Vampiress, Golem, Swamp Beast, The Phantom of the Opera, Jotun Troll, Invisible Man, Dr. Jekyll, and Mummy—made no appearance whatsoever in the game, although Werewolf did appear on the cover. Warlock and Minotaur were the only two monsters from series 2 to appear in the game. In the comic book, however, Medusa declared that by her count, Vampire's side had a majority, though all the other series 1 monsters were included as enemies in the game. Blemmyes appeared prominently on the cover, and the figure was distributed exclusively with the game, though did not appear in the game itself. It came inside the box, next to a smaller piece of styrofoam than NES cartridge boxes normally contained.

The Asian release of this game is titled Batman & Flash, an unlicensed rom hack of the game where the main playable characters are replaced with Batman and The Flash.

==== Reception ====
Reception

Review score
Publication	Score
Electronic Gaming Monthly	6/10, 7/10, 7/10, 6/10

=== Animated special ===
In 1992, there was an animated special, Monster in My Pocket: The Big Scream, produced by Hanna-Barbera and directed by Don Lusk from a script by Glen Leopold, where Vampire (now with ample hair in a late 18th-century-style ponytail; voiced by Rob Paulsen) became the leader of the villains, and Invisible Man, now named Dr. Henry Davenport (even though he was called the Invisible Man in the intro and was referred to as such by Vampire; voiced by Paxton Whitehead), was in charge of the heroes. Swamp Beast (vocal effects by Frank Welker) was a mindless villain among the other changes, such as the formerly white-furred Werewolf (although by the fourth issue it had been changed to brown) becoming the Jamaican "Wolf-Mon" (voiced by Stuart K. Robinson). The other good monsters were Big Ed (The Monster; also voiced by Frank Welker) and Mummy (voiced by Marvin Kaplan), while Medusa (voiced by B. J. Ward) remained among the ranks of the evil monsters. A few others, like Tyrannosaurus Rex and Cyclops, were shown for a second or two during the prologue.

The prologue showed that the Invisible Man and the other good monsters had managed to capture and imprison all of the bad monsters in Monster Mountain, now a prison guarded by the good monsters rather than a meeting place (as it had been in the comic book), and Vampire tried to escape by shrinking himself. The spell, however, backfired and caused everyone of the monsters, as well as the good monsters, to shrink to one inch high and blows the shrunken mountain to Los Angeles. This time, their human host is Carrie Raven (voiced by Dina Sherman), daughter of famous horror writer Edgar Raven. The evil monsters learn they would grow at the sound of screams, while the good monsters grow with laughter. The story was that both factions of monsters were trying to regain their size to resume their evil ways or recapture the evil monsters before they could do serious harm. Mitzi McCall and April Winchell did other voices in the special.

This special ran on Halloween of 1992 on ABC, but was not carried in all markets. Early releases of the special on video from Vidmark Entertainment contained a glow-in-the-dark monster: Charun, Thunderdell, or Yama.

=== Commercial tie-ins ===
There also an audio cassette of original music along with a cover version of Bobby Pickett's "Monster Mash" titled Monster Rock, produced by Rincon Children's Entertainment for BMG Kidz in 1992. The songs were written by a person with the last name of Byrd, James McDonnell, Peter Pope, Randy Petersen, Robert Irving, and a person with the last name of Quinn. Pope, McDonnell, Petersen, and Irving played the keyboards, George Bell played saxophone, and Barry Scott and Charles Dickens played guitar, with Dickens providing drum programming and engineering. Singers were Jake Vesprille, Michael Hunter, Gigi Young, Barry Scott, Jimmy McDonnell, Mary McDonnell, Rory McDonnell, Peter Hix, Katrina Perkins, and Bob Joyce. "Saturday Night at the Boneyard" was the only song to mention monsters from series 2 or 3. The other songs are "Monster in My Pocket", "Witches Brew", "Monsters", "Can't Do a Thing With My Hair" (Byrd/McDonnell), "Do the Boo", "Full Moon Blues", "Boogie Man Boogie" (Byrd/McDonnell/Pope), "Monster Party" (Petersen/Irving/Quinn), and "Party in Your Pocket" (Pope). John Weems, Joe Morrison, and Ralph King were the executive producers.

In 1994, the monsters received a popularity boost in Mexico; they were part of a promotion from the Sonrics candy company. This promotion consisted of boxes full of candy, a random monster figure, and any of the following: trading cards, mini-comics and mini activity books. Part of this promotion was a collector set modeled after Monster Mountain available by phone order, but oddly the company kept saying by phone there was no such offer.

=== CGI series ===
In 2003, Peak Entertainment in the United Kingdom partnered with Mainframe Entertainment to produce a CGI-animated series that changed the concept considerably. It dealt with monsters trapped in a "Tapestry of Terror" that was shredded in battle with the now-good Warlock and his evil brother, "Morlock". They looked identical save that where Warlock's hair and clothing were white, Morlock's were black. A few good monsters, including Vampiress and The Monster, side with Warlock and his young apprentice to recapture the monsters, including Vampiress' evil brother, Vampire. One addition to the series, according to its bible, was Mothman, which had previously not been represented. The series was picked up by GMTV in the United Kingdom with Cartoon Network eyed as the broadcast partner in the United States, but was ultimately never produced.

At MIPCOM 2019, France's Cyber Group Studios unveiled plans for a CG-animated series produced with Morrison Entertainment Group. The series was being developed by Mike Yank and had a projected budget of $9.5 million USD. The series was ultimately scrapped and Cyber Group Studios was liquidated in 2025.

== See also ==
- Cryptozoology
- List of fictional species
- Lists of legendary creatures
- Book of Imaginary Beings
- The Lesser Key of Solomon
- Megami Tensei, a Japanese series with a similar theme

== Bibliography ==
- Hill, James. Monster Wrestlers in My Pocket Annual 1996, Manchester: Egmont Publishing Ltd., 1995. ISBN 0-7498-2414-X
- McDuffie, Dwayne, Monster in My Pocket, Harvey Comics, May–November 1991.
- Monster in My Pocket Album de Figuritas, De Lunes a Viernes: Cromy Club, 1992.
- Monster in My Pocket Sticker Album, London, Panini Publishing Ltd., 1992.
