= Trickster =

Literary archetype

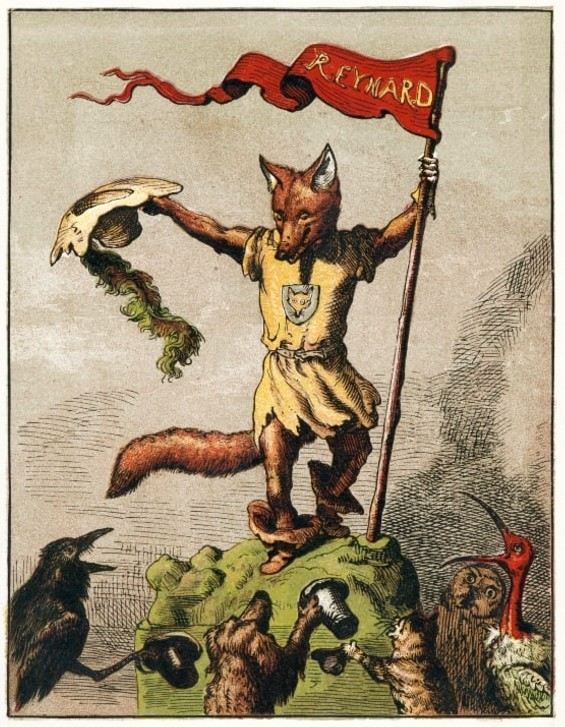
The trickster figure Reynard the Fox as depicted in an 1869 children's book by Michel Rodange

In mythology and the study of folklore and religion, a trickster is a character in a story who exhibits a great degree of intellect or secret knowledge and uses it to play tricks or otherwise disobey normal rules and defy conventional behavior. Such a character may be a god, goddess, spirit, human or anthropomorphisation.

== Mythology ==
Tricksters, as archetypal characters, appear in the myths of many different cultures. Lewis Hyde describes the trickster as a "boundary-crosser". The trickster crosses and often breaks both physical and societal rules: Tricksters "violate principles of social and natural order, playfully disrupting normal life and then re-establishing it on a new basis."

Often, this bending and breaking of rules takes the form of tricks and thievery. Tricksters can be cunning or foolish or both. The trickster openly questions, disrupts and mocks authority.

Many cultures have tales of the trickster, a crafty being who uses tricks to get food, steal precious possessions, or simply cause mischief. In some Greek myths Hermes plays the trickster. He is the patron of thieves and the inventor of lying, a gift he passed on to Autolycus, who in turn passed it on to Odysseus. In Slavic folktales, the trickster and the culture hero are often combined.

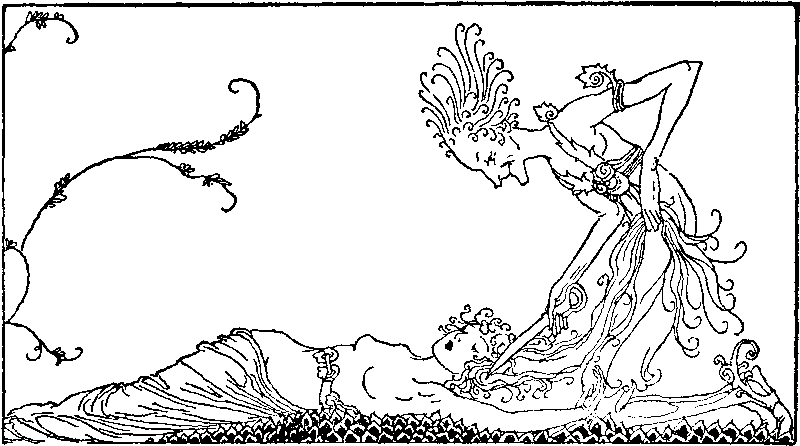
Loki cuts the hair of the goddess Sif.

Frequently the trickster figure exhibits gender and form variability. In Norse mythology the mischief-maker is Loki, who is also a shapeshifter. Loki also exhibits sex variability, in one case even becoming pregnant. According to "The Song of Hyndla" in The Poetic Edda, Loki becomes a mare who later gives birth to Odin's eight-legged horse Sleipnir.

In African-American folklore, a personified rabbit, known as Brer Rabbit, is the main trickster figure. In West Africa (and thence into the Caribbean via the slave trade), the spider (see Anansi) is often the trickster. In southern African folklore, the entity known as Kaggen often takes the role of a trickster, usually taking the form of a praying mantis.

== Native American tradition ==
While the trickster crosses various cultural traditions, there are significant differences between tricksters from different parts of the world:

Many native traditions held clowns and tricksters as essential to any contact with the sacred. People could not pray until they had laughed, because laughter opens and frees from rigid preconception. Humans had to have tricksters within the most sacred ceremonies for fear that they forget the sacred comes through upset, reversal, surprise. The trickster in most native traditions is essential to creation, to birth.

Native American tricksters should not be confused with the European fictional picaro. One of the most important distinctions is that "we can see in the Native American trickster an openness to life's multiplicity and paradoxes largely missing in the modern Euro-American moral tradition". In some stories, the Native American trickster is foolish; other times wise. He can be a hero in one tale and a villain in the next.

In many Native American and First Nations mythologies, the Coyote spirit (Southwestern United States) or Raven spirit (Pacific Northwest) stole fire from the gods (stars, moon, and/or sun). Both are usually seen as jokesters and pranksters. In Native American creation stories, when Coyote teaches humans how to catch salmon, he makes the first fish weir out of logs and branches.

Wakdjunga in Winnebago mythology is an example of the trickster archetype.

Wisakedjak (Wìsakedjàk in Algonquin, Wīsahkēcāhk(w) in Cree and Wiisagejaak in Oji-Cree) is a trickster figure in Algonquin and Chipewyan Storytelling.

Nanabozho or Nanabush is a combined trickster spirit and culture hero in Anishinaabe aadizookaan (traditional storytelling), particularly among the Ojibwe of North America.

=== Coyote ===
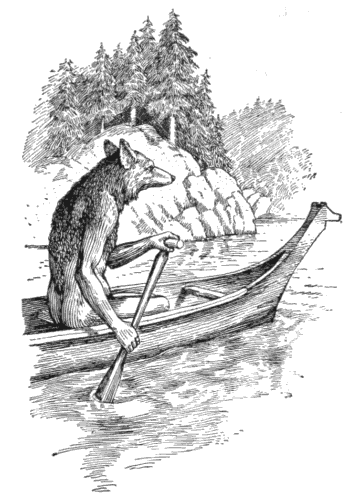
Coyote often has the role of trickster as well as a clown in traditional stories.

The Coyote mythos is one of the most popular among western Native American cultures, especially among indigenous peoples of California and the Great Basin.

According to Crow (and other Plains) tradition, Old Man Coyote impersonates the Creator: "Old Man Coyote took up a handful of mud and out of it made people". He also bestowed names on buffalo, deer, elk, antelopes, and bear. According to A. Hultkranz, the impersonation of Coyote as Creator is a result of a taboo, a mythic substitute to the religious notion of the Great Spirit whose name was too dangerous and/or sacred to use apart from at special ceremonies.

In Chelan myths, Coyote belongs to the animal people but he is at the same time "a power just like the Creator, the head of all the creatures." while still being a subject of the Creator who can punish him or remove his powers. In the Pacific Northwest tradition, Coyote is mostly mentioned as a messenger, or minor power.

As the culture hero, Coyote appears in various mythic traditions, but generally with the same magical powers of transformation, resurrection, and "medicine". He is engaged in changing the ways of rivers, creating new landscapes and getting sacred things for people. Of mention is the tradition of Coyote fighting against monsters. According to Wasco tradition, Coyote was the hero to fight and kill Thunderbird, the killer of people, but he could do that not because of his personal power, but due to the help of the Spirit Chief. In some stories, Multnomah Falls came to be by Coyote's efforts; in others, it is done by Raven.

More often than not Coyote is a trickster, but always different. In some stories, he is a noble trickster: "Coyote takes water from the Frog people... because it is not right that one people have all the water." In others, he is malicious: "Coyote determined to bring harm to Duck. He took Duck's wife and children, whom he treated badly." Coyote serves as a personification of humanity's traits, both good and bad. This is accomplished by making the character admirable and laughable, he is a character who is never quite satisfied with the way things are. The stories show how Coyote's actions may be alluring, but they also show the consequences of his poor decisions, and how people should think about the fate of Coyote before replicating his actions.

== Other traditions ==
In Chinese folk religion, trickster deities include the Wutong gods, Ji Gong, and later personifications of the Monkey King (Sun Wukong).

== Oral stories ==
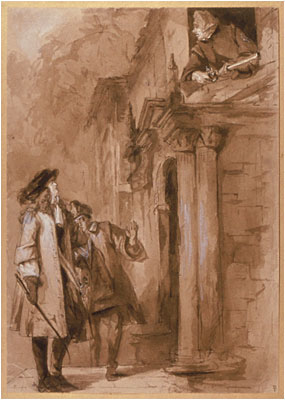
Trickster subplot in The Relapse: Tom Fashion, pretending to be Lord Foppington, parleys with Sir Tunbelly Clumsey in a 19th-century illustration by William Powell Frith.

- Abenaki mythology: Azeban
- Afro-Cuban mythology: Eleggua, Eshu
- Akan mythology: Kwaku Ananse
- American folklore of African origin: Brer Rabbit (compare Compère Lapin in the French-speaking Caribbean), Aunt Nancy (a corruption of Anansi, also spelt 'Anansee', among other spellings)
- Arabian mythology: Juha, Sinbad
- Ashanti folklore: Anansi
- Australian Aboriginal mythology: Bamapana, Crow
- Aztec mythology: Huehuecoyotl
- Babylonian mythology: Lilith
- Bantu mythology: Hare (Tsuro or Kalulu)
- Basque mythology: San Martin Txiki
- Belgian mythology: Lange Wapper
- Brazilian folklore: Saci, Curupira
- Bulgarian/Macedonian folklore: Hitar Petar (Itar Pejo), Kuma Lisa
- Caribbean folklore: Anansi
- Celtic mythology: Fairy, Puck, puca
- Chinese mythology: Huli jing (Fox spirit), Nezha, Red Boy, Sun Wukong (Monkey King)
- Chukchi mythology: Kutkh
- Costa Rican folklore and literature: Tío Conejo (Uncle Rabbit)
- Cree mythology: Wisakedjak
- Crow mythology: Awakkule, Mannegishi
- Dutch folklore: Reynaert de Vos, Tijl Uilenspiegel
- Egyptian mythology: Set, Isis
- English folklore: Robin Hood, Puck, Brownies
- Fijian mythology: Daucina
- French folklore: Renart the Fox
- German folklore: Reineke Fuchs, the Pied Piper, Till Eulenspiegel
- Greek mythology: Eris, Prometheus, Hermes, Odysseus, Sisyphus
- Haitian folklore: Anansi, Ti Malice
- Hawaiian mythology: Kaulu, Kupua
- Hindu mythology: Baby Krishna (stealing butter), Narada, Mohini, Hanuman (shapeshifting and teasing sages).
- Hopi and Zuni mythology: Kokopelli
- Igbo folklore: Ekwensu
- Igbo mythology: Mbeku
- Inuit mythology: Amaguq
- Irish folklore: Leprechauns, Briccriu
- Islamic mythology: Iblis, Khidr, Nasreddin
- Italian folklore: Giufà (Sicily), Pulcinella (Naples), Harlequin (Bergamo).
- Japanese mythology: Kitsune, Susanoo, Kappa, Bake-danuki, Hare of Inaba
- Jewish folklore: Hershele Ostropoler (Ashkenazi), Joha (Sephardic)
- Kazakh folklore: Aldar kose
- Kiowa folklore: Saynday
- Korean folklore: Kumiho, Dokkaebi, Seokga
- Lakota mythology: Iktomi, Heyoka
- Latin American and Spanish folklore: Pedro Urdemales (Pedro Malasartes in Portuguese)
- Levantine mythology: Yaw
- Malay folklore: Sang Kancil (The Mousedeer)
- Māori mythology: Māui
- Mayan mythology: Maya Hero Twins, Kisin
- Micronesian mythology: Olifat
- Miwok mythology: Coyote
- Nigerian mythology: Agadzagadza
- Norse mythology: Loki
- Norwegian mythology: Espen Askeladd
- Northwest Caucasian mythology: Sosruko
- Ohlone mythology: Coyote
- Ojibwe mythology: Nanabozho
- Philippine mythology: Nuno sa Punso, Tikbalang, Pilandok
- Polynesian mythology: Maui
- Pomo mythology: Coyote
- Pueblos dancing: Koshares
- Romanian mythology: Păcală
- Russian folklore: Ivan the Fool
- San Folklore: ǀKaggen
- Slavic mythology: Veles
- Spanish mythology: Don Juan, The Trickster of Seville
- Sumerian religion: Enki
- Tibetan folklore: Akhu Tönpa,
- Thai folklore: Sri Thanonchai
- Tumbuka mythology: Kalulu
- Ukrainian folklore: Lys Mykyta, Oleksa Dovbush, Lysychka-sestrychka, Cossack Mamay
- Ute mythology: Cin-an-ev
- Vietnamese folklore: Trạng Quỳnh, Bang Bạnh – Xã Xệ – Lý Toét, Thằng Bờm, Cuội, Bác Ba Phi
- Vodou: Papa Legba, Ti Malice, Baron Samedi
- Welsh mythology: Gwydion, Taliesin, Morgan Le Fay, Twm Siôn Cati
- West African mythology: Anansi, Tortoise
- Yoruba religion: Eshu

== Literature and popular culture ==
In modern literature, the trickster survives as a character archetype, not necessarily supernatural or divine, sometimes no more than a stock character.

Often, the trickster is distinct in a story by their acting as a sort of catalyst; their antics are the cause of other characters' discomfiture, but they are left untouched. Shakespeare's Puck is an example of this. Another once-famous example was the character Froggy the Gremlin on the early USA children's television show "Andy's Gang". A cigar-puffing puppet, Froggy induced the adult humans around him to engage in ridiculous and self-destructive hi-jinks.

For example, many European fairy tales have a king who wants to find the best groom for his daughter by ordering several trials. No brave and valiant prince or knight manages to win them, until a poor and simple peasant comes. With the help of his wits and cleverness, instead of fighting, they evade or fool monsters, villains and dangers in unorthodox ways. Against expectations, the most unlikely candidate passes the trials and receives the reward.

More modern and obvious examples of the trickster archetype include Bugs Bunny, the Cheshire Cat from Lewis Caroll's Alice's Adventures in Wonderland and Jerry from Tom and Jerry.

Several characters from DC Comics were characterized as tricksters, such as Joker in Batman and Trickster in The Flash. When the Comics Code Authority banned gore, innuendo and excessive violence, it stripped Batman of his menace and transformed the Joker into a goofy, thieving trickster without his original homicidal tendencies. Since the Bronze Age of Comics, the Joker has been interpreted as an archetypal trickster, displaying talents for cunning intelligence, social engineering, pranks, theatricality, and idiomatic humor. Like the trickster, the Joker alternates between malicious violence and clever, harmless whimsy. He is amoral and not driven by ethical considerations, but by a shameless and insatiable nature, and although his actions are condemned as evil, he is necessary for cultural robustness. The trickster employs amoral and immoral acts to destabilize the status quo and reveal cultural, political, and ethical hypocrisies that society attempts to ignore. However, the Joker differs in that his actions typically only benefit himself. The Joker possesses abnormal body imagery, reflecting an inversion of order. The trickster is simultaneously subhuman and superhuman, a being that indicates a lack of unity in body and mind. In Arkham Asylum: A Serious House on Serious Earth, the Joker serves as Batman's trickster guide through the hero's own psyche, testing him in various ways before ultimately offering to cede his rule of the Asylum to Batman. The Joker's unpredictable, homicidal nature makes him one of the most feared supervillains in the DC Universe; the Trickster says in the 1995 miniseries Underworld Unleashed, "When super-villains want to scare each other, they tell Joker stories."

During the making of the 2003 film Pirates of the Caribbean: The Curse of the Black Pearl, there were conversations between director Gore Verbinski and writers Ted Elliott and Terry Rossio where they decided to make Jack Sparrow and Hector Barbossa two sides, Sparrow the light and Barbossa the dark of the same trickster archetype. Long John Silver from Robert Louis Stevenson's novel Treasure Island as well as the Clint Eastwood and Lee Van Cleef characters from the Western films by Sergio Leone were among the inspirations of the idea.

== Online and multimedia ==
In online environments, there has been a link between the trickster and Internet trolling. Some have said that a trickster is a type of online community character. Gabriel Moshenska argues that Mesopotamian copper merchant Ea-nāṣir is depicted as a trickster in online culture through an imagining of deliberately unfair trade practices that enrich him and leave his customers at a disadvantage, and especially because it appears that he "collected" their complaint letters as trophies.

Anthropologist James Cuffe has called the Chinese internet character Grass Mud Horse (cǎonímǎ 草泥马) a trickster candidate because of its duplicity in meaning. Cuffe argues the Grass Mud Horse serves to highlight the creative potential of the trickster archetype in communicating experiential understanding through symbolic narrative. The Grass Mud Horse relies on the interpretative capacity of storytelling in order to skirt internet censorship while simultaneously commenting on the experience of censorship in China. In this sense Cuffe proposes the Grass Mud Horse trickster as 'a heuristic cultural function to aid the perceiver to re-evaluate their own experiential understanding against that of their communities. By framing itself against and in spite of limits the trickster offers new coordinates by which one can reassess and judges one's own experiences.'

== See also ==
- Grotesque body
- Juan Bobo
- Malandro
- Miwok Coyote and Silver Fox
- Structuralist approach to myth

== Sources ==
- Gates, Henry (2004), Julie Rivkin; Michael Ryan (eds.), "The Blackness of Blackness: A Critique on the Sign and the Signifying Monkey", Literary Theory: An Anthology, Oxford: Blackwell Publishing
- Earl, Riggins R. Jr. (1993). Dark Symbols, Obscure Signs: God, Self, And Community in the Slave Mind. Maryknoll, New York: Orbis Books.
- Bassil-Morozow, Helena (2011). The Trickster in Contemporary Film. Routledge.
- Ballinger, Franchot; Vizenor, Gerald (1985). "Sacred Reversals: Trickster in Gerald Vizenor's 'Earthdivers: Tribal Narratives on Mixed Descent'". American Indian Quarterly. 9 (1, The Literary Achievements of Gerald Vizenor): 55–59. doi:10.2307/1184653. JSTOR 1184653.
- Ballinger, Franchot (1991). "Ambigere: The Euro-American Picaro and the Native American Trickster". MELUS. 17 (1, Native American Fiction: Myth and Criticism): 21–38. doi:10.2307/467321. JSTOR 467321.
- Bellér-Hann, Ildikó. "Hair-Raising Stories: The Trickster in Uyghur Oral Tradition." Asian Anthropology 3, no. 1 (2004): 13-38.
- Boyer, L. Bryce; Boyer, Ruth M. (1983). "The Sacred Clown of the Chiricahua and Mescalero Apaches: Additional Data". Western Folklore. 42 (1): 46–54. doi:10.2307/1499465. JSTOR 1499465.
- Datlow, Ellen and Terri Windling. 2009. The Coyote Road: Trickster Tales. Firebird.
- California on the Eve – California Indians Miwok creation story
- Joseph Durwin Coulrophobia & The Trickster
- Koepping, Klaus-Peter (1985). "Absurdity and Hidden Truth: Cunning Intelligence and Grotesque Body Images as Manifestations of the Trickster". History of Religions. 24 (3): 191–214. doi:10.1086/462997. JSTOR 1062254. S2CID 162313598.
- Lori Landay Madcaps, Screwballs, and Con Women: The Female Trickster in American Culture 1998 University of Pennsylvania Press
- Jones, Christa C., editor. Djeha, the North African Trickster. Jackson: University Press of Mississippi, 2023. 196 pages. ISBN 1496847059.
- Paul Radin The trickster: a study in American Indian mythology (1956)
- Allan J. Ryan The Trickster Shift: Humour and irony in contemporary native art 1999 Univ of Washington ISBN 0-7748-0704-0
- Shibasaki, Shota, Ryosuke Nakadai, and Yo Nakawake. "Biogeographical ‍distributions of trickster animals." Royal Society Open Science 11, no. 5 (2024): 231577.
- Trickster's Way Volume 3, Issue 1 2004 Article 3 "Trickster and the Treks of History".
- Tannen, R. S., The Female Trickster: PostModern and Post-Jungian Perspectives on Women in Contemporary Culture, Routledge, 2007
