= Christopher Slaughterford =

Englishman accused of murder (18th-century)

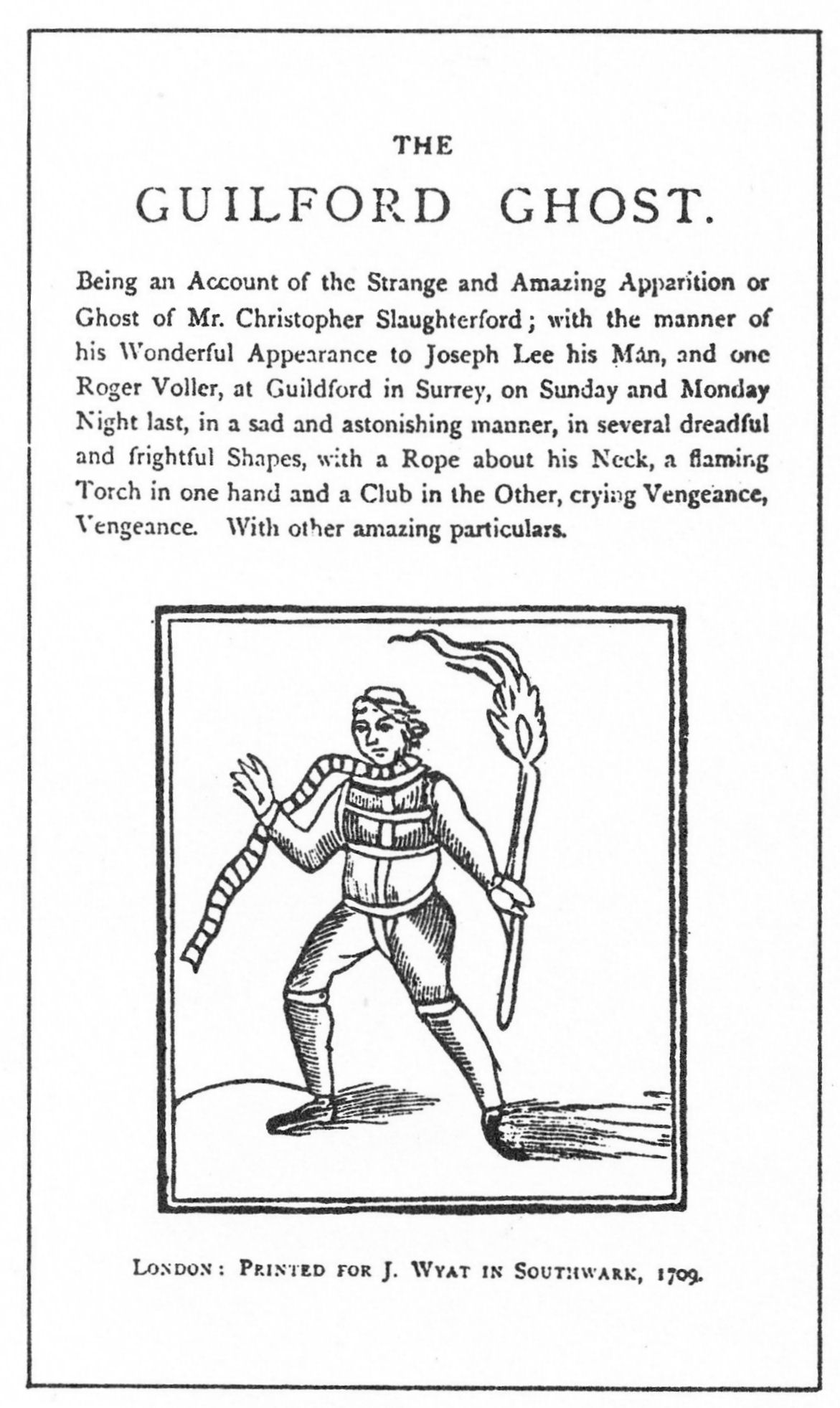
Cover of a 1709 pamphlet reporting the alleged sightings of Christopher Slaughterford's ghost.

Christopher Slaughterford of London was executed in Guildford July 9, 1709, for the murder of Jane Young, his fiancée. His case is very important, as he was the first person in modern England executed for murder based exclusively on circumstantial evidence. He is also famous for supposedly finding his fiancée's killer, one of his servants, in the form of a ghost.

Slaughterford was the last person seen in Jane Young's company on October 5, 1703. He exhibited tell-tale signs of his innocence in that he cooperated fully with all police investigations and had previously been acquitted at trial in Kingston. He had a strong alibi, yet some neighbors who did not have such strong alibis still testified to his guilt at his second trial.

The date of his execution, he wrote and signed the following statement:

"Being brought here to die, according to the sentence passed upon me at the Queen's-Bench bar, for a crime of which I am wholly innocent, I thought myself obliged to let the world know, that they may not reflect on my friends and relations, whom I have left behind me much troubled for my fatal end, that I know nothing of the death of Jane Young, nor how she came by her death, directly or indirectly, though some have been pleased to cast reflections on my aunt. However, I freely forgive all my enemies, and pray to God to give them a due sense of their errors, and in his due time to bring the truth to light. In the mean time, I beg every one to forbear reflecting on my dear mother, or any of my relations, for my unjust and unhappy fall, since what I have here set down is truth, and nothing but the truth, as I expect salvation at the hands of Almighty God; but I am heartily sorry that I should be the cause of persuading her to leave her dame, which is all that troubles me. As witness my hand this 9th day of July."

== Legend ==
As a ghost, he is said to appear in chains, with the cut noose around his neck, holding a staff in one hand, and a burning brand in the other, crying "Vengeance, Vengeance!" According to the legend, the guilty servant saw him and killed himself.

== In popular culture ==
Slaughterford is Monster in My Pocket #107.
