= Azeban =

Trickster in Abenaki mythology

Creature information
- Sub grouping: animal
- Folklore: Abenaki mythology

Origin
- Region: Northeastern North America
- Details: trickster

Azeban (Pronounced ah-zuh-bahn, also spelled Azban, Asban or Azaban), or "the Raccoon," is a lower-level trickster spirit in Abenaki mythology. The traditional homeland of the Abenaki is Wobanakik (Place of the Dawn), what is now called northern New England, southern Quebec, New Brunswick and Nova Scotia. Azeban is a raccoon, the Abenaki trickster figure. Azeban does many foolish and/or mischievous things in Abenaki folktales, but unlike animal tricksters in some other tribes, is not dangerous or malevolent.

Azeban deceives animals and other beings for food or other services.

There is an Abenaki story where a woman names her six dogs after their characteristics. She named one of the dogs Azeban. This woman Cedar Girl of the Abenaki [Dawn Land People] naming her dog "Azeban" has caused some confusion, causing people to assume the Abenaki trickster figure is a dog, not realizing she called the dog Azeban because he has the characteristics of the raccoon, the actual Abenaki Trickster figure. In the story the dog Azeban is one of a litter of six dogs born to Awasosqua (Bear Woman). The others are Awasosis (Little Bear), Kwaniwibid (Long Tooth), Mikwe (Squirrel), Moosis (Little Moose) and Soksemo (Good Nose). All the spirits in Awasosqua's broods are dogs, and are named after their characteristics.

In another story, Azeban sees a waterfall and, appreciating its noise, thinks he can make an even louder sound. He shouts until he loses his balance and falls in.
