= Nokomis =

Grandmother of Nanabozho in Ojibwe mythology

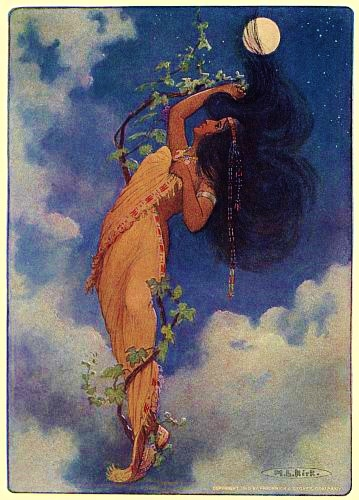
From The Full Moon Fell Nokomis - From The Story Of Hiawatha, Illustrator M. L. Kirk - 1910

Nokomis is the name of Nanabozho's grandmother in the Ojibwe traditional stories and was the name of Hiawatha's grandmother in Henry Wadsworth Longfellow's poem, The Song of Hiawatha, which is a re-telling of the Nanabozho stories. Nokomis is an important character in the poem, mentioned in the familiar lines:

By the shores of Gitche Gumee,
By the shining Big-Seawater
Stood the wigwam of Nokomis
Daughter of the moon Nokomis.
Dark behind it rose the forest
Rose the black and gloomy pine-trees
Rose the firs with cones upon them
Bright before it beat the water
Beat the clear and sunny water
Beat the shining Big-Sea-Water.

According to the poem, From the full moon fell Nokomis/Fell the beautiful Nokomis. She bears a daughter, Wenonah. Despite Nokomis' warnings, Wenonah allows herself to be seduced by the West-Wind, Mudjekeewis, Till she bore a son in sorrow/Bore a son of love and sorrow/Thus was born my Hiawatha.

Abandoned by the heartless Mudjekeewis, Wenonah dies in childbirth, leaving Hiawatha to be raised by Nokomis. The wrinkled old Nokomis/Nursed the little Hiawatha and educates him.

In the Ojibwe language, nookomis means "my grandmother," thus portraying Nokomis of the poem and the aadizookaan (Ojibwe traditional stories) from a more personal point of view, akin to the traditional Ojibwa narrative styles.

== Things named after Nokomis ==
=== Places ===
United States

- Nokomis Avenue, a broad road in Chicago and Lincolnwood, Illinois.
- Nokomis Avenue, a street in Minneapolis.
- Camp Nokomis, all girls sleepaway camp run by the Merrimack Valley YMCA. Camp Lawrence is the boys camp that is on the same island and run by the same YMCA.
- Nokomis, Alabama, a community in Escambia County, Alabama which was a railroad stop
- Nokomis, Escambia County, Florida, a community in northwest Florida adjoining Nokomis, Escambia County, Alabama. While not a census designated place, the name reference is in local use.
- Nokomis, Sarasota County, Florida, a census-designated place.
- Nokomis Township, Buena Vista County, Iowa
- Nokomis, Illinois, a city
- Nokomis, Minneapolis, Minnesota, a neighborhood
- Lake Nokomis, part of a chain of lakes connected by Minnehaha Creek in Minneapolis, Minnesota
- Nokomis Regional High School, in Newport, Maine
- The Nokomis Native American Cultural Learning Center in Okemos, Michigan
- Nokomis Elementary School, in Ukiah, California
- Nokomis Park in Cheektowaga (town), New York
- Nokomis Groves, a landmark.
- Nokomis Pond, town reservoir of Newport, Maine
- Lake Nokomis, created in 1911 by a dam that is now called Harry Reasoner dam in Humboldt, Iowa.
- Lake Nokomis, in Oneida and Lincoln counties, Wisconsin
- Lake Nokomis, a reservoir in the vicinity of Red Feather Lakes Village in Larimer County, Colorado
- Nokomis Township, Oneida County, Wisconsin
- Lake Nokomis (Rice Reservoir on Tomahawk River) in Lincoln/Oneida counties in Wisconsin
- Nokomis Inc. Small privately owned business located in Charleroi, Pennsylvania.
- Nokomis Elementary School, Sachem CSD, Ronkonkoma, New York. (Sachem also includes a Hiawatha & Wenonah elementary schools).
- Nokomis Road, Sudbury, Massachusetts.
- Nokomis Road, Wilbraham, Massachusetts.
- Nokomis Road, Apple Valley, California.
- Nokomis Way, Natick, Massachusetts.
- Nokomis Elementary, Medford Lakes, New Jersey

Canada

- Nokomis, Saskatchewan
- Nokomis Trail, part of Lake Superior Provincial Park, Ontario
- Nokomis Park, part of Larose Forest in Limoges, Ontario, Limoges Village, Prescott-Russell counties, Ontario
- Nokomis Beach Road, outside of Sault Ste. Marie , Ontario

=== In fiction ===
Nokomis is also a character in Richard Adams' fantasy novel Maia. She has a son called Anda Nokomis.

=== Vessels ===
- USS Nokomis (YT-142) was a fleet tug that was in the Yard Craft Dock of the Navy Yard at the beginning of the Japanese attack on Pearl Harbor on 7 December 1941. She provided assistance to other ships and survived the attack.
- SS Delphine (1921) was originally named Nomokis.

== Nokomis Pottery Red Wing Minnesota ==
Red Wing Potteries Inc. produced Nokomis glazed pottery from 1929 to 1934.
