= Alom-bag-winno-sis =

Aquatic dwarfs from Abenaki mythology

Alom-bag-winno-sis, or alom-begwi-no-sis, are a race of dwarf-like aquatic humanoids from Abenaki mythology. It is believed a sight of them is an ill omen that foretells a death by drowning.

== Description ==
=== Appearance ===
Alom-bag-winno-sis are said to stand at about 3 feet tall, have straight black hair that falls down to their waist, and to stay nude.

=== Behavior ===
Alom-bag-winno-sis are said to be capable of magically growing and shrinking their size, and to possess a magical cooking pot that could make a few kernels of corn grow to be enough to feed themselves and their community. Residing underwater, they are typically found in communities, but there are stories of them living on their own. The sight of an alom-bag-winno-sis is said to foretell a death by drowning. Ones that dwell in particularly turbulent waters are said to capsize boats in order to injure and drown people themselves. They are described as being similar to the dwarves and fairies of European folklore, and sometimes as a type of fey or dwarf themselves.
