= Kee-wakw =

According to the folklore of the Abenaki tribe of the north-eastern United States, a Kee-wakw or Giwakwa was a cannibalistic, half-animal half-human giant creature that inhabited the forests and woodlands of the area of present-day New England during ancient times.

Most legends describe them as former humans whose hearts turned to ice due to either possession by an evil spirit or commission of some dreadful crime, such as cannibalism or allowing a person to starve but he doesn't feel regret for his crimes, he only feels hunger, that is all he is able to feel. Other Abenaki legends speak of Asinikiwakw, who were not transformed humans but man-eating stone giants, who were defeated by the culture hero Gluskabe.
