= M. T. Kelly =

Canadian novelist, poet and playwright (born 1947)

- Born: November 30, 1947 (age 78); Toronto, Ontario, Canada
- Education: York University
- Occupations: novelist, poet and playwright
- Spouse: Lynn King

Milton Terrence Kelly (born November 30, 1947) is a Canadian novelist, poet and playwright.

Born in Toronto, Ontario, Kelly attended Parkdale Collegiate Institute, York University and the University of Toronto. His first novel, I Do Remember The Fall (1977), was nominated for the Books in Canada First Novel Award. This book was followed by two books of fiction from Black Moss Press: The More Loving One and The Ruined Season. Kelly's third novel A Dream Like Mine (1987) won the Governor General's Award for fiction and was made into the movie Clearcut. A book of poetry, Country You Can't Walk In, won the first Toronto Arts Council Award. Two other novels with Stoddart followed, Out of the Whirlwind and Save Me Joe Louis, as well as a book of short stories, All that Wild Wounding.

Among other collections M.T. Kelly's work was included in The Thinking Heart: Best Canadian Essays (1991) and The Saturday Night Traveller.

His play The Green Dolphin was performed at Theatre Passe Muraille.

A frequent contributor to The Globe and Mail, M.T. Kelly also worked as a reporter for the Moose Jaw Times-Herald.

In 2000, when his wife, Madam Justice Lynn King was diagnosed with breast cancer, and his publisher of 30 years, General Publishing, went bankrupt, M.T. Kelly stopped publishing. Another contributing factor was the death of his friend, colleague, and sometime editor, author Carole Corbeil.

Kelly remained silent after his wife's death in March 2005, but Exile Editions then re-printed A Dream Like Mine in its Canadian Classics series with an introduction by Canadian writer Daniel David Moses. Along with the reprinting of A Dream Like Mine Exile published a new book, Downriver, which contained poetry, a memoir, and a short story about the people in the memoir.

M.T. Kelly's papers are in the Thomas Fisher Rare Book Library archives at the University of Toronto.

== Bibliography ==
=== Novels ===
- I Do Remember the Fall - 1977
- The Ruined Season - 1982
- A Dream Like Mine - 1987
- Out of the Whirlwind - 1995
- Save Me, Joe Louis - 1998

=== Short stories ===
- The More Loving One - 1980
- Breath Dances Between Them - 1991

=== Poetry ===
- Country You Can't Walk In - 1979

=== Drama ===
- The Green Dolphin play - 1982
