= Atosis =

Being in Abenaki and Algonquian folklore

Atosis or Kci-Athussos is a mythological being from Abenaki and Algonquian folklore in northeastern North America. It is a large, swimming snake.

In one legend, Atosis had once been a human man but became a snake later. He fights the hero Glooskap but never manages to kill him. In one of the stories, Atosis captures Glooskap's brother, Abistanooch the marten. Glooskap tells Abistanooch how to trick Atosis, and they defeat him together.

In another story, a woman has fallen in love with the snake, and she lures her husbands, one after the other, to the water for the snake to eat. In another, the woman falls in love with the snake but does not kill her husband or harm anyone.

Maine writer Christopher Packard numbers Champ, the cryptid of Lake Champlain among Atosis.

== Etymology ==
The name Kci-Athussos means "great serpent."
