= Winter-Telling Stories =

Book of Native American stories

- Front cover of Winter-Telling Stories, 1947 Crowell edition.
- Author: Alice Marriott
- Illustrator: Roland Whitehorse
- Publisher: Thomas Y. Crowell Company, W. Sloane Associates
- Publication date: 1947
- Publication place: New York City

Winter-Telling Stories is a collection of Kiowa tales written by Alice Marriott and illustrated by Kiowa artist Roland Whitehorse. It was one of the first childrens books of Kiowa stories to be published.

The stories all center around the Kiowa trickster-hero Saynday and how his actions are said to have shaped the world. Oftentimes, his own tricks will backfire on him in humorous ways. The book is split into two sections. The first section, called Saynday-does-good, focuses on how he aided humanity, ie. how he brought the sun. The second section is called Saynday-makes-trouble, and tells both of his successful trickery and of tricks that backfire on him.

The book contains the first written account of the legend "Why the Deer Have Short Teeth," which had previously been unknown to wider academia.

== Background ==
Marriott spent time with the Kiowa collecting folklore for this book. Previously, she had published The Ten Grandmothers, a history of the Kiowa people.

== Reception ==
The book was praised for its succinct style of prose and relatively simple vocabulary, making it good both for adults reading aloud and for children first learning how to read. Whitehorse's illustrations were also heavily praised for their use of color and humor. Due to the target audience, much of the cultural context surrounding the stories is not present in the book.

== Editions ==
- New York: Thomas Y. Crowell Company, 1947.
- New York: W. Sloane Associates, 1947.
- New York: Thomas Y. Crowell Company, 1969.
