= Elbow witch =

Women in the Ojibwe story of Aayaase

Elbow witches are old women with awls in their elbows in the Ojibwe story of Aayaase (also known as Aayaash or Iyash), "Filcher-of-Meat". Blinded by cooking smoke, the sisters kill each other in their attempts to kill him for their meal.
