= Thunderdell =

Mythological two-headed giant of Cornwall

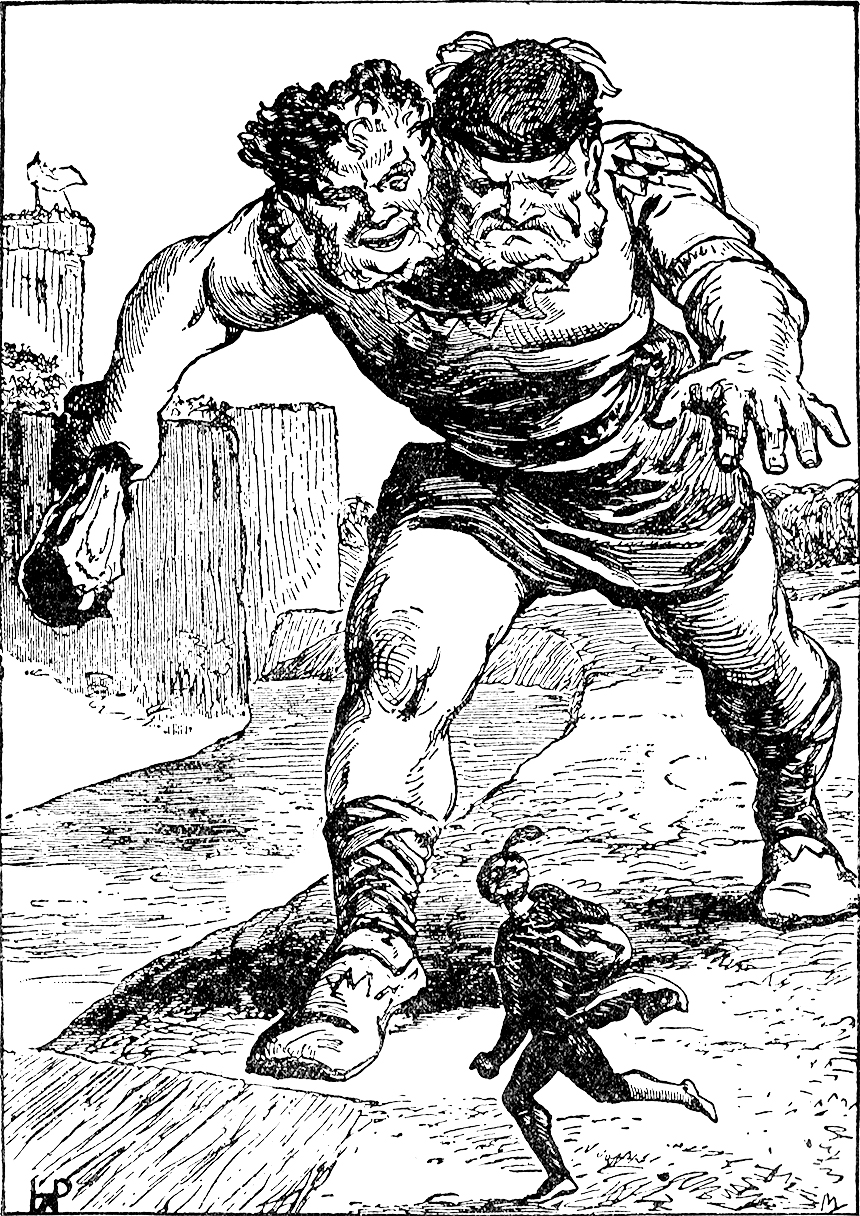
Illustration from Mother Fairy-Tales

Thunderdell (Welsh: Taranau), also recorded as Thunderdel, Thunderel, Thundrel, Thunderdale, or Thunderbore, was a two-headed giant of Cornwall slain by Jack the Giant-Killer in the stories of Tabart and others.

== Appearance ==
In Jack the Giant Killer, Thunderdell first appeared where he crashed a banquet that was prepared for Jack. During this time, he chanted "fee fau fum." Jack defeats and beheads the two-headed giant with a trick involving the house's moat and drawbridge.

According to one version of the story from 1800, Thunderdell (here identified as "Thunderful") hails from the North Pole. He attacks Jack's banquet in order to avenge the deaths of two giants he had earlier slain, but is himself defeated and his heads sent to the court of King Arthur.

== Popular culture ==
- Thunderdell is in the Monster in My Pocket where his number is #98.
- The Thunderdell name is used for a giant in Jack and the Beanstalk: The Real Story who was portrayed by Bill Barretta. This version is based on the giant from "Jack and the Beanstalk".
