= Ti Malice and Bouki =

Haitian mythological figure

Ti Malice is a trickster character and nemesis of Tonton (Uncle) Bouki in Haitian folklore. While Ti Malice is smart and guileful, Uncle Bouki is hardworking but is also very greedy. It is the manipulation of this greed that allows Ti Malice to often get the best of Uncle Bouki. These characters are said to be a split of Anansi, the trickster character of the Ashanti of Ghana.

Bouki and Malice have their origins in African oral traditions. In Senegal and neighbouring countries, these two characters appear in animal form. Bouki is represented as a hyena, which is called "Bouki" in the Fulani and Wolof languages, while Malice is a hare called "Leuk" in Senegal. From there, character traits develop that identify the two companions. Bouki, the hungry and skinny hyena and Leuk, the hare with a mischievous character and legendary cunning.

Two equivalent figures, also a hyena known as Bouki and a hare (called Lapin), are known to exist in Louisiana folktales.

== See Also ==
- Br'er Rabbit
