= Albert Murray (writer) =

American writer

- Born: May 12, 1916; Nokomis, Escambia County, Alabama, U.S.
- Died: August 18, 2013 (aged 97); Harlem, New York, U.S.
- Education: Tuskegee Institute (BS); University of Michigan; Northwestern University; University of Paris; New York University (MA)
- Occupation: Writer
- Military career
- Allegiance: United States
- Branch: United States Air Force
- Service years: 1943–1962
- Rank: Major

Albert L. Murray (May 12, 1916 – August 18, 2013) was an American literary and music critic, novelist, essayist, and biographer. His books include The Omni-Americans, South to a Very Old Place, and Stomping the Blues.

== Biography ==
=== Early life ===
Murray was born in Nokomis, Alabama. His biological mother, Sudie Graham, gave him up for adoption to Hugh and Mattie Murray. He grew up in the Magazine Point area of Mobile, Alabama.

He attended Tuskegee Institute on scholarship and received a B.S. in education in 1939. One of his fellow students was Ralph Ellison.

Murray briefly enrolled in a graduate program at the University of Michigan before returning to Tuskegee in 1940 to teach literature and composition. In 1941, he married Mozelle Menefee; they had a daughter, Michele. While based at Tuskegee, he completed additional graduate work at Northwestern University in 1941 and the University of Paris in 1951.

=== Military service ===
Murray joined the United States Army Air Forces in 1943 with the desire to "live long enough for Thomas Mann to finish the last volume of Joseph and His Brothers." In 1946, he transferred to the United States Air Force Reserve and enrolled at New York University on the GI Bill, where he received an M.A. in English in 1948. During this period, he became acquainted with Duke Ellington and solidified his close friendship with Ralph Ellison, who wrote the novel Invisible Man in 1952, establishing his reputation and providing him a lifetime income.

After briefly returning to his position at Tuskegee, he opted to pursue a more financially remunerative career as a member of the Active Guard Reserve in 1951 to better support his young family. Over the next decade, Murray was stationed in a number of locales (ranging from Morocco to California to Massachusetts) and taught a geopolitics course in the Tuskegee ROTC program. In 1962, after a doctor's exam revealed signs of heart disease, he retired from the United States Air Force as a major. He and his wife moved to the Lenox Terrace Apartments in Harlem, where they were based for the remainder of their lives.

=== Literary career ===
Thereafter, Murray began his literary career in earnest, regularly publishing in such periodicals as Life and The New Leader. The July 3, 1964 edition of Life included his article "The Problem Is Not Just Black and White", which examined seven books on race relations.

Murray published his first book in 1970. The Omni-Americans contained a series of essays and reviews on such topics as protest literature and the Moynihan Report on black poverty. In the introduction, he wrote that "the United States is in actuality not a nation of black people and white people. It is a nation of multi-colored people." According to author Walker Percy, The Omni-Americans "may be the most important book on black-white relations in the United States, indeed on American culture, published in this generation."

He followed that up with a non-fiction book about the American South called South to a Very Old Place (1971). It had begun as a reporting assignment by Harper's Magazine editor Willie Morris. South to a Very Old Place was reviewed by Toni Morrison in The New York Times and was a finalist for the National Book Awards.

Starting with Train Whistle Guitar (1974), Murray wrote four novels that featured an alter ego named Scooter. The novels follow Scooter from childhood through college and into his career as a musician and writer.

Murray wrote about the importance of blues and jazz music in such books as The Hero and the Blues (1973) and Stomping the Blues (1976). He received the 1977 ASCAP Deems Taylor Award for Stomping the Blues. In addition, he collaborated with Count Basie on the latter's memoir Good Morning Blues (1985).

He held visiting lectureships, fellowships, and professorships at several institutions, including the Columbia University Graduate School of Journalism (1968), Colgate University (1970; 1973; 1982), the University of Massachusetts Boston (1971), the University of Missouri (1972), Emory University (1978), Drew University (1983), and Washington and Lee University (1993). From 1981 to 1983, he was an adjunct associate professor of writing at Barnard College. He received honorary doctorates from Colgate (Litt.D., 1975) and Spring Hill College (D.H.L., 1995).

As noted, he became close friends with Ralph Ellison after college. Their relationship informed the thinking and writing of both men. Trading Twelves: The Selected Letters of Ralph Ellison and Albert Murray was published in 2000. Murray was also a friend of artist Romare Bearden. Bearden's six-panel collage The Block (1971) was inspired by the view from Murray's Harlem apartment. Murray later appeared in the 1980 documentary Bearden Plays Bearden.

Murray received greater attention in the 1980s and 1990s due to his influence on critic Stanley Crouch and jazz musician Wynton Marsalis. With Marsalis, Murray was the co-founder of Jazz at Lincoln Center. Crouch wrote about Murray at length in his book Always in Pursuit.

Henry Louis Gates Jr. concluded his 1996 New Yorker profile of Murray by noting: "This is Albert Murray's century; we just live in it."

He was the inaugural recipient of the Harper Lee Award in 1998.

=== Death ===
Murray died in Harlem on August 18, 2013. The following month, a memorial service was held at Jazz at Lincoln Center.

The Library of America released an anthology of his nonfiction writing in 2016. Henry Louis Gates Jr. and Paul Devlin served as editors. A follow-up collection with Murray's fiction and poetry was published in 2018.

== Selected bibliography ==
- The Omni-Americans (1970)
- South to a Very Old Place (1971)
- The Hero and the Blues (1973)
- Train Whistle Guitar (1974)
- Stomping the Blues (1976)
- The Spyglass Tree (1991)
- The Blue Devils of Nada (1996)
- The Seven League Boots (1996)
- Trading Twelves: The Selected Letters of Ralph Ellison and Albert Murray (2000)
- Conjugations and Reiterations: Poems (2001)
- From the Briarpatch File: On Context, Procedure, and American Identity (2001)
- The Magic Keys (2005)
