= Clearcut (film) =

- Theatrical release poster with Ontario Film Review Board ratings sticker.
- Directed by: Ryszard Bugajski
- Screenplay by: Robert Forsyth
- Based on: A Dream Like Mine by M. T. Kelly
- Produced by: Ian McDougall; Stephen J. Roth
- Starring: Graham Greene; Floyd Red Crow Westerman; Ron Lea; Michael Hogan
- Cinematography: François Protat
- Edited by: Michael Rea
- Music by: Shane Harvey
- Production company: Cinexus Capital Corporation
- Distributed by: C/FP Distribution
- Release dates: 10 September 1991 (Toronto Film Festival); 6 December 1991 (Vancouver)
- Running time: 100 minutes
- Country: Canada
- Language: English

Clearcut is a 1991 Canadian horror-thriller film directed by Ryszard Bugajski and starring Graham Greene, Floyd Red Crow Westerman, Ron Lea, and Michael Hogan. It follows a white lawyer in an unnamed Canadian province who finds his values shaken when he meets an angry Indigenous activist who insists on kidnapping the head of a logging company clearcutting on native land.

Filmed in Thunder Bay, Ontario, and based on the novel A Dream Like Mine (1987) written by M. T. Kelly, it covers complex subject matter such as the land rights of indigenous peoples in Canada, pacifism, colonialism, and environmentalism. Greene, known for his prolific work, including the critically acclaimed Dances with Wolves, is quoted as saying this is his favorite movie in which he has acted.

Through making Clearcut, Bugajski stated that he set out to portray the issues that he saw existing with pacifism. By forcing the viewer to consider the arguments of the characters alongside their actions he hoped to show the viewer the complexity of these issues where good and evil is not so easily divided.

== Plot ==
A seaplane carries white lawyer, Peter Maguire, to a First Nations reserve in the forests of rural Canada, where activists are engaged in a long, chaotic protest to block a road that would lead to clearcutting on Indian land. Maguire is representing the native band whose land is designated for deforestation and has come to tell them that they have lost the court case and that the logging company will begin building their road. A young girl, Polly, guides Maguire to a scene of police brutalizing protesters as the trees are torn down. An elder member of the Nation and Maguire's personal contact, Wilf Redwing, stoically refuses the loss and states that it is a long battle. Maguire repeatedly states his intention to appeal the court's decision, though he admits that he doubts the chances of success.

Wilf invites Maguire to a sweat lodge ceremony to purify himself and give him clarity on his next course of action. The ceremony turns dark as Maguire has haunting visions of cave paintings, fallen trees, blood, and Arthur. Wilf introduces the attorney to Arthur, a militant Indigenous activist, who wears a distinctive star-shaped pendant. Maguire commiserates with Arthur, jokingly wishing to blow up the mill and skin the plant manager alive. Later that night, Arthur recruits Maguire to kidnap the logging company's plant manager, Bud and the four, including Wilf, take off through the woods where Arthur claims he will "instruct" Peter and Bud in "listening to Mother Earth".

As they travel deeper into the wilderness, Arthur's behavior grows increasingly erratic and violent. Both Bud and Arthur chastise Maguire for not picking a side as he wavers between loyalty to the natives and faith in white colonialist systems. Further, they both point out how Maguire has made his living off a series of lost cause legal battles; even in his attempts to help, he exploits and profits. The next morning, Arthur skins and cauterizes Bud's leg. Two Mounties, on a manhunt for the kidnapped white men, stumble upon the camp. Ignoring Maguire’s protests, Arthur kills them both.

Wilf gives warnings and insinuations that Arthur may actually be Wisakedjak, an Indigenous trickster spirit (whom Wilf also refers to as "the Deceiver"). The men engage in another sweat ceremony. In this one, Bud recites the Lord's Prayer while Arthur chants out his own prayer. Maguire, having a panic attack, attempts to interrupt them, but they both scold him for interrupting their prayers and continue on. After the sweat ceremony, Arthur forces Bud and Maguire to climb a mountain, showing them a valley of trees. He asks Bud if he can see what will be lost. Bud cannot. Maguire attempts to escape, but Arthur gets ahead of him seemingly by magic. Maguire and Arthur fight. Maguire, managing to get the upper hand, stabs Arthur with his own knife. Maguire grabs Arthur's nearby gun and attempts to shoot him, only to find the gun is out of ammo. Arthur smiles enigmatically at Maguire and enters the nearby water, sinking to the bottom seemingly without drowning.

Wilf arrives by boat to return Maguire and Bud to civilization. As they reach the reserve they are detained by the waiting police. Nearby, Polly, the same young girl that guided Maguire in the beginning, wears Arthur's pendant.

== Cast ==
- Graham Greene as Arthur
- Ron Lea as Peter Maguire
- Michael Hogan as Bud Rickets
- Floyd Red Crow Westerman as Wilf
- Rebecca Jenkins as Louise
- Tia Smith as Polly
- Tom Jackson as Tom Starblanket
- Michael J. Reynolds as Hunter
- David A. Sutton as Pilot
- Raoul Trujillo as Eugene

== Release ==
Clearcut premiered at the Toronto International Film Festival on 10 September 1991 and continued to screen in Toronto in the fall of that year. The film opened theatrically in Vancouver on 6 December 1991, and in Calgary on 11 December 1991. The film premiered in the United States in New York City on 21 August 1992, and in Los Angeles on 30 October 1992. The Longview News-Journal likened the film to a "mystic re-thinking of Sam Peckinpah's Straw Dogs."

=== Critical response ===
Elizabeth Aird, writing for the Vancouver Sun, praised the film as a "compelling, well-written movie" and a "nightmare odyssey." The Calgary Herald's Fred Haeseker commented on the film's dark and violent content, summarizing: "Clearcut shares a rare, impressive intensity."

Michael Wilmington of the Los Angeles Times praised Graham Greene's performance as the most powerful element of the film.

=== Home media ===
Clearcut was given a Region 2 DVD release in the United Kingdom in 2007. The film was released on Blu-ray in North America in December 2021 as part of the All the Haunts Be Ours: A Compendium of Folk Horror set by Severin Films.

== Legacy ==
While the film never saw mainstream success in North America, it has developed a cult following in Germany. One possible reason that Clearcut failed to make a lasting impact was its proximity to the Oka Crisis, a widely covered land dispute between First Nations and the town of Oka, Quebec that resulted in violent clashes between Indigenous protesters and Quebec police. Clearcut's somewhat ambiguous and brutal portrayal of land claim disputes, along with its extreme violence targeted towards police and business owners could have contributed to its lack of success.

To this day, Clearcut remains an important part of the discussion surrounding the portrayal of indigenous peoples in contemporary film. Hollywood's Indian: The Portrayal of the Native American in Film (2003) labels Clearcut a sympathetic portrayal of modern indigenous peoples, in which "native actors get to act out their colonially-induced angst". The Canadian Horror Film: Terror of the Soul (2015) comments on the character of Arthur being portrayed as a spiritual being, and how he is a symbolic representation of the response to colonial attitudes of racism and inequity.

== Sources ==
- Ahmad, Aalya (2015). "Blood in the Bush Garden: Indigenization, Gender, and Unsettling Horror". In Freitag, Gina; Loiselle, André (eds.). The Canadian Horror Film: Terror of the Soul. Toronto: University of Toronto Press. pp. 47–66. ISBN 978-1-442-62404-7.
- Rollins, Peter C.; O'Connor, John E., eds. (1998). Hollywood's Indian: The Portrayal of the Native American in Film (ENL - Enlarged, 2 ed.). University Press of Kentucky. ISBN 978-0-813-19077-8. JSTOR j.ctt2jcnf1.
