= Jack and the Beanstalk: The Real Story =

- Promotional poster
- Also known as: The Giant and the Greedy Jack
- Genre: Drama; Adventure; Fantasy
- Written by: James V. Hart; Brian Henson; Bill Barretta
- Story by: James V. Hart; Brian Henson
- Directed by: Brian Henson
- Starring: Matthew Modine; Mia Sara; Jon Voight; Vanessa Redgrave; Richard Attenborough; Daryl Hannah; James Corden; JJ Feild
- Voices of: Brian Henson
- Narrated by: Vanessa Redgrave
- Composer: Rupert Gregson-Williams
- Country of origin: United States
- Original language: English

Production
- Executive producers: Bill Haber; James V. Hart; Brian Henson
- Producers: Martin G. Baker; Thomas G. Smith
- Production locations: Bray Film Studios; Windsor, Berkshire, England, UK
- Cinematography: John Fenner
- Editors: Victoria Boydell; Tracy Granger
- Camera setup: Paul Donachie; Mike Proudfoot; Robert Dibble; Steven Hall; Rod Marley; Nathan Mann; Tony Jackson
- Running time: Germany: 174 minutes (2 parts); Greece: 180 minutes
- Production companies: Hallmark Entertainment; The Jim Henson Company

Original release
- Network: CBS
- Release: December 2 – December 4, 2001

Jack and the Beanstalk: The Real Story is a 2001 American television miniseries directed by Brian Henson. A co-production of Hallmark Entertainment and The Jim Henson Company, it is based on the classic English tale "Jack and the Beanstalk". The story was considerably reworked to reflect what Henson believed to be a more ethical, humanist view. The cast includes Matthew Modine as the modern-day descendant of Jack, Mia Sara as a mysterious woman attempting to bring him to justice for the murder of a giant, Jon Voight as the descendant's greedy manager intending to inherit the company, Vanessa Redgrave as an elderly relative of the descendant, and Richard Attenborough, Daryl Hannah, and James Corden as giants. The series aired on CBS from December 2 to December 4, 2001.

Among the other giants in the film are beings from various cultures including Hebrew, Buddhist, and Nordic.

== Plot ==
Jack Robinson (Matthew Modine) is the wealthy CEO of an influential worldwide company. Throughout his family's past, no Robinson male has lived to be over 40, and Jack keeps having a dream about his father being chased by a giant. He tries very hard to stay healthy with the help of his Albanian butler, Dussan (Jonathan Hyde). The manager of his business affairs, Siegfried "Siggy" Mannheim (Jon Voight), convinces him to turn down a project involving alternative food supplies of genetically engineered plants to feed the third world, and also to build a casino complex in a small town to which the locals object.

During construction, the workers discover the skeleton of a giant. A strange young woman called Ondine (Mia Sara) then appears and accuses Jack of being a murderer before vanishing. That night, a man sneaks into Jack's house and takes him to see an old woman whom Jack recognizes as his great-aunt Wilhelmina (Vanessa Redgrave), who he believed was dead. Wilhelmina tells him the traditional version of the fairy tale "Jack and the Beanstalk" in which the giant is portrayed as a selfish, gluttonous brute who cared for nothing and no one, subsequently giving him the last magic bean (the original Jack was given five beans but only four grew into the beanstalk, the fifth one having landed on the windowsill instead of earth), suggesting that the tale that she has told him may not be the truth, and that the answers he seeks about recent events may be found at the other end of the beanstalk.

Jack plants the bean in the forest near the location where the giant was discovered, and the bean grows into a huge beanstalk leading Jack into a magical world where a single day passes for every year that passes on the ground below. Jack is left stranded in the Giant's dimension after the beanstalk dissolves, apparently cut down by someone back on Earth, and discovers that the giant Thunderdell (Bill Barretta) was an extremely benevolent person: kind, honest, and a loving friend and father who had also adopted Ondine and raised her as his own daughter. Jack's ancestor (also named Jack) betrayed Thunderdell's trust, stealing the harp and the goose, and ultimately killing Thunderdell. His descendants grew rich, at the truly horrible cost of the giant's world being subjected to a curse where "no crops will grow; we will never see spring again" as the giant world slowly dies over time. Only with the return of the treasures or the death of the Robinson family would the magic be restored, hence the Robinson family curse. Despite her doubts about Jack after what happened when she fell for his ancestor—due to the different flow of time between the worlds only around one year has passed in the Land of the Giants as opposed to centuries here—Ondine recognizes that Jack is not the man his ancestor was (all the other Giants are aware of this, but still want to kill him as his death can break their curse, and they refuse to allow him the chance to find and return the treasures due to the long period of suffering their world has endured), and transports him back to Earth to help her find the Harp of Harmony and the Goose of Prosperity.

During their search, Jack learns that his 'great-aunt' Wilhelmina is actually the mother of the first Jack, and that she was the one who killed Thunderdell. While her descendants were cursed to die young, she was cursed to live forever and witness their punishment. Siggy is also revealed to have known the truth all along and was entrusted to tell Jack when he came of age, but instead encouraged Jack to care about nothing but his work and never marry so that when he died, Siggy would inherit the company and Robinson estate. He also admits to having cut down the beanstalk and left Jack stranded in the giant world. Siggy attempts to kill Jack and Ondine, but three of the Giants suddenly intervene and knock him out.

With the return of the Goose and Harp, the Giants' world is restored, and the Giants thank Jack for undoing his ancestors' mistakes. Bran, Thunderdell's son, takes his father's position as the guardian of the Goose and Harp. Back on Earth, Jack makes amends for his past mistakes by funding the aforementioned third-world food supply project. A newspaper headline reveals that Siggy has been committed to an asylum after claiming to be hunted by giants. Wilhelmina, finally free of the curse, passes away peacefully with Jack and Dussan at her side. Ondine then spends one week (seven years in our world) with Jack before they plan to head back to the Giant world.

== Cast ==
- Matthew Modine as Jack Robinson, the fifteenth generation descendant of the original Jack. Unlike his ancestor, this Jack is a good and honest man.
- Mia Sara as Ondine, a woman who was taken in by Thunderdell and raised as his own child after losing her parents to disease. A kind and loving young woman, Ondine's heart became hard and her demeanor sour after the original Jack betrayed her and broke her heart.
- Vanessa Redgrave as Countess Wilhelmina, the original Jack's mother and Thunderdell's actual murderer. Unlike the rest of her family, Wilhelmina was cursed for her crimes by becoming immortal, never aging one day, only to see all her descendants die before their time, claimed by the Robinson Curse, and her family wither away.
- JJ Feild as original Jack Robinson, a young con-man in poverty who was chosen at random by Magog in the hopes that he would unite the two worlds. Instead he gives into greed, steals the harp and goose of prosperity and becomes complacent in the murder of Thunderdell, thus beginning the Robinson curse despite gaining wealth.
- Daryl Hannah as Thespee, a giantess once worshiped as a goddess by the Norse people. A beautiful woman with pale skin and blonde hair, Thespee is the kindest and most reasonable of the giants' council.
- Jon Voight as Sigfriend "Siggy" Mannheim, Jack's unscrupulous second-in-command in his business dealings. The model of a corrupt businessman, all Siggy cares about is making money and gaining power.
- Anton Lesser as Vidas Merlinis, a research scientist for Jack Robinson's family business. Vidas had a strong desire to see an appropriate amount of the Robinson fortune used for the noble effort to stop world hunger. Instead, after the disappearance of Jack, Mannheim employs Vidas to manage the production of golden eggs. In the end, Vidas tells the media that the Robinson fortune would be spent to help feed the starving nations of the world.
- Richard Attenborough as Magog, the wisest and most ancient of all giants. Magog is the leader of their council.
- Bill Barretta as Thunderdell, the original guardian of the Harp of Harmony and the Goose of Prosperity. Radically different from most of his portrayals in fairy tales, Thunderdell was a very kind-hearted giant.
- Jim Carter as Odin, a one-eyed giant with blue hair who was worshiped by the Vikings as the king of their gods. Hot-tempered and accusatory, Odin shows no remorse towards judging Jack based on crimes committed by an ancestor who has been dead for almost 400 years.
- James Corden as Bran, Thunderdell's son and Ondine's best friend. Bran tried to save his father from falling to his death, but failed; a guilt that has haunted him ever since.
- Jonathan Hyde as Dussan, Jack's butler and aide-de-camp.
- Nicholas Beveney as Cernos, a dark-skinned giant with the head of a stag. Cernos was worshiped as the god of forests by the ancient Celtic people of western Europe. Cernos watches over the plants and animals of the giants' world. His anger at Jack is great, for it is the wildlife of his world that has suffered most from the loss of Galaga and Harmonia.
- Roger Blake as Thor, Odin's son. A large, heavily muscled giant with a bushy red beard who wields a huge hammer called Mjolnir as a weapon. He was worshiped by the Vikings as their god of storms.
- Hon Ping Tang as Mahacalla, a blue-skinned giant with four arms. Mahacalla is still worshiped to this day by the Hindu peoples of the Indian subcontinent.
- Denise Worme as Nimna, a solidly built, dark-skinned giantess who wears her hair in long dreadlocks. Nimna is worshipped as a goddess of fertility and childbirth by many tribes in central Africa.
- Mak Wilson – Galaga (performer)
- Brian Henson – Galaga (voice)

== Origin ==
When CBS executive Michael Wright originally proposed the idea of a Jack and the Beanstalk TV miniseries, Henson originally refused, but reconsidered when he was told he would be allowed to alter the original story. He then worked on the story with screenwriter James V. Hart, who had previously collaborated with Henson on Muppet Treasure Island. Henson later declared that during that time he came to hate the original story. “It's a fairy tale that became part of British culture during a time when empire building and conquering other cultures was heroic”, he said. “No matter how bad you say the giant was and all of that, the morality really stinks.”

Ultimately, the story ended up taking place in the present time, with Jack Robinson, the head of a large company journeying to the land of the giants to right the wrongs of his family's past. “Again, it returns thematically to how we all should be sharing in the responsibility to bring balance to the Force...", states Henson.

These changes resulted in a darker story. “It's not particularly a piece that kids should watch on their own, but it's a great piece for adults to watch with their children”, said Henson on that subject.

== Production ==
To create the special and visual effects in the film, Jim Henson's Creature Shop was given the task of branching out into computer animation, compositing and matte painting, as well as creating animatronic characters. "It made sense to use The Creature Shop not only from a financial perspective but also for the benefits of having everyone working under one roof. The same group that conceived the characters and visual effects were also responsible for their creation, resulting in a unified, consistent look," said Henson. With 400 plus effects shots, the film includes many fantasy elements, but Henson described it as having more human characters and more reality than many of his other fantasy and science-fiction projects, which he said was refreshing.

In order to create the giant beanstalk, which, in the film, shoots up out of the forest floor and into the sky, there was an extensive use of CGI. However, a practical, 20-foot-tall (6.1 m) section was built for actor Matthew Modine to climb.

The Creature Shop working with Visual Effects Supervisor Julian Parry also created an entirely computer-generated character. Harmonia is a human-like, animated, talking statue that is part of the Golden Harp (one of the giant's original treasures). Originally, Henson and his team considered using a live-action actress, because Henson wanted the character to be very lifelike. However, the decision was made to instead try to achieve such an effect with computer animation. “… If we had used an actress, she wouldn't have looked magical – she would have simply looked like a person with gold paint hugging a harp,” said Sean Feeney, Creature shop visual effects producer for the film.

Several animatronic characters were also created, including a puppeteered goose (Galaga) and an animatronic head for the giant Cernos. All of the giants in the film are played by regular-sized actors and actresses composited into the film so that they appear to be much larger. Their movements were also slowed down.

“In each instance, we tried to use the most appropriate technique, whether it was through animatronics, puppetry, prosthetics, CGI, or hybrids,” said Feeney.

== Bibliography ==
- Joe Nazzaro, Back to the Beanstalk, Starlog Fantasy Worlds (magazine), February 2002, pages 56–59
- Karen Moltenbrey, A Twisted Tale: Artists use digital effects to give a modern-day slant to a classic fairy tale, Computer Graphics World (magazine), January 2002, Volume 25, Number 1, pages 24–27
