= Wisakedjak =

Crane Manitou in northern Algonquian and Dene lore

Wisakedjak (Wìsakedjàk in Algonquin, Wīsacaklesss(w) in Cree and Wiisagejaak in Oji-cree) is the Crane Manitou found in northern Algonquian and Dene storytelling, similar to the trickster Nanabozho in Ojibwa aadizookaanan (sacred stories), Inktonme in Assiniboine lore, and Coyote or Raven from many different tribes. His name is found in a number of different forms in the related languages and cultures he appears in, including Weesack-kachack, Wisagatcak, Wis-kay-tchach, Wissaketchak, Woesack-ootchacht, Vasaagihdzak, and Weesageechak.

== Mythology ==
As with most mythological characters, Wisakedjak is used to explain the creation of animals or geographical locations. He is generally portrayed as being responsible for a great flood which destroyed the world. In other stories he is also one of the beings who created the current world, either on his own, or with magic given to him by the Creator for that specific purpose.

== Oral Narratives ==
The oral stories of Wisakedjak passed down through generations are recorded and documented throughout that include:

- Louis Bird, Muskegon

== Contemporary indigenous literature and art ==
- Wisakedjak features in four animated shorts from Stories from the Seventh Fire in 1999, based on the art by Norval Morriseau
- Kiss of the Fur Queen by Tomson Highway (Cree) is a 1998 novel about the author and his brother's childhoods, their trauma resulting from the Canadian Indian residential school system, and his brother's death from AIDS. As the boys struggle to survive, Wisakedjak appears in the form of The Fur Queen, who watches over the boys as they fulfill their destiny to become artists.
- In 2010, artist Kent Monkman (Cree) created a painting called Weesageechak Teaches Hermes How to Trick the Four-Leggeds showing Wisakedjak as a naked man wearing purple, high-heeled boots.

== In other literature, film and popular culture ==
- In the 1991 film Clearcut, Wiisagejaak is referred to as "the Deceiver" by a First Nations elder named Wilf, portrayed by Floyd "Red Crow" Westerman (Dakota). A man who appears from the lake, portrayed by Graham Greene (Oneida), may be Wiisagejaak himself.
- Wisakedjak is a character in the book series Malazan Book of the Fallen
- Wisakedjak is a character in the book American Gods by Neil Gaiman, where he is frequently referred to as "Whiskey Jack" (a corruption of this figure's traditional name). In the book, he appears as an old Native man, who lives in a mobile home, somewhere near a Lakota reservation in the badlands with Johnny Appleseed. In the television series, he is played by Graham Greene.

== See also ==
- Demiurge
- Glooscap
- Nanabozho
