= Kuma Lisa =

Trickster character in eastern European folklore

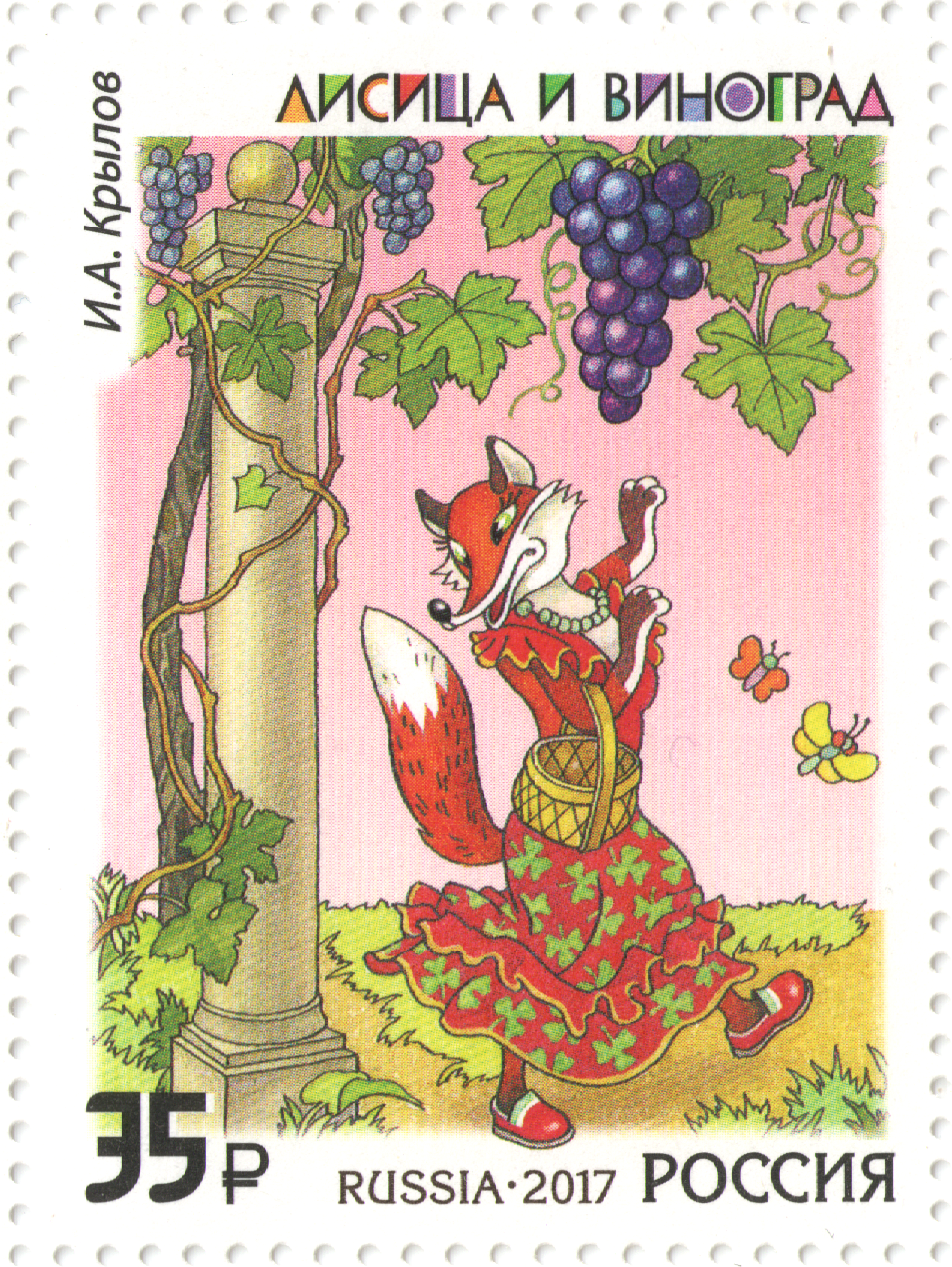
Lisitsa i vinograd by Ivan Krylov, based on Aesop's fable

Kuma Lisa (Macedonian and Bulgarian: Кума Лиса, lit. 'Godmother Fox'), colloquially Kumushka Lisa (Russian: Кумушка Лиса) (Note: The Wolf salutes to the Fox in this way in Russian fairy tales.) or Lisa Patrikeyevna (Russian: Лиса Патрикеевна, lit. 'Fox Patrikas's-daughter', named after the sly prince Patrikas) or Lysychka-sestrychka (Ukrainian: Лисичка-сестричка which means Fox-sister) is a character who is a fox from Macedonian, Bulgarian, Russian and Ukrainian folklore.

She usually plays the role of the trickster, as an archetype. Many folk tales as well as authored works use the character of Kuma Lisa. In many tales Kuma Lisa has encounters with Kumcho Vulcho (Bulgarian: Кумчо Вълчо, lit. 'Godfather Wolf'), a wolf which is often the victim of her tricks.
