= Aayaase =

Character in the Aadizookaan of the Anishinaabe peoples

Aayaase (also known as ᐋᔾᔮᐦᔥ (Aayaash; unpointed as ᐊᔾᔭᔥ) or Iyash; recorded by William Jones as Āyāsä) is a character found in the Aadizookaan of the Anishinaabe peoples. Similar in nature to the Ojibwe Nanabozho stories, the Aayaash stories tell of his trials and tribulations, with each story carrying a moral.
