= Chenoo =

Creatures of Algonquin folklore

The Chenoo are mythological creatures or evil spirits from Algonquin folklore, generally seen as cannibalistic ice giants, comparable to that of the Wendigo.

== Folklore ==
=== Description ===
Chenoo are generally described as larger than the average man, getting bigger the hungrier they are. They have sharp fangs which stand out due to their lips having been chewed off. Chenoo used to be human, being corrupted by dark magic and cursed to eat people's flesh. Their bodies become excruciatingly warm, forcing them to live out in the snow. Most stories take the point of view of the Chenoo rather than the humans.

Charles Godfrey Leland describes the Chenoo as having "something made of devil, man, and beast in their most dreadful forms. It was like a haggard old man, with wolfish eyes; he was stark naked; his shoulders and lips were gnawed away, as if, mad with hunger, he had eaten his own flesh" (233).

There are a few ways to kill a Chenoo, usually requiring doing so more than once. Some versions say the only way to ensure they are truly dead is to chop up their bodies into multiple pieces. There is no way of destroying the Chenoo except by destroying their icy heart, either by tricking them into eating salt or forcing them into eating so much that they throw it up.

=== Legends ===
Myth of the Chenoo and Kindness as Transformative

The Girl and The Chenoo tells of a sister and her brothers who happen upon Chenoo tracks in the woods. The brothers write it off as bear tracks, but the sister laid baskets of berries on a pile of bear skins. When the Chenoo showed up, the sister pretended to mistake it for her grandfather. Trying to keep up this illusion, it begins to do tasks for them such as chopping wood and hunting animals for meat. When the siblings decided to return to their tribe, the Chenoo asked them to build a sweat lodge for it. Inside, the Chenoo coughed up the icy lump and reverted to its human form.

Leland's 1884 Version

Charles Godfrey Leland's retells this story in his 1884 book The Algonquin Legends of New England: Or, Myths and Folk Lore of the Micmac, Passamaquoddy, Penobscot Tribes. In Leland's version, the Chenoo battles another Chenoo to protect the family. The attacking Chenoo is a female and more vicious and stronger than the male Chenoo. The male Chenoo wins with help from the humans. Leland also adds more importantly a Christian add on to the story. In this version, the Chenoo returns with the family, but is dying. A priest found the Chenoo "ignorant of all religion as a wild beast" (244). The Chenoo was first angry with the priest, but then he listened, and his heart changed, The Chenoo asked to be baptized. As the first tear which he ever shed came to his eyes, the old man/Chenoo died.

Myth of Chenoo Creation

The Girl-Chenoo tells of a woman who rejected a man's advances, causing the man to seek revenge by turning her into a Chenoo. She immediately notices the changes and forces her family to fire seven arrows into her heart, effectively ending the curse.
