= Awes-kon-wa =

Native American mythological figure

Awes-kon-wa is a Native American mythological figure of the Haudenosaunee Mohawk people. It is described as a small, winged sprite.
