= Mudjekeewis =

Spirit in Ojibwe mythology

In Ojibwe mythology, Mudjekeewis (from the Anishinaabe language majiikiwis "first-born son") is a spirit, and figures prominently in their storytelling, including the story of the world's creation. In their aadizookaanan (traditional stories), Majiikiwis is the first-born son of the E-bangishimog, the West Wind, and is cast as the guardian of tradition and ceremonies, symbolized by the bear.

Of the medicinal plants, white cedar is associated with Majiikiwis. He is the eldest brother to Nanabozho.

However, in The Song of Hiawatha based on the aadizookaanan, Mudjekeewis is portrayed instead as E-bangishimog himself, ravishing Wenonah and fathering Hiawatha. However, even in The Song of Hiawatha, Mudjekeewis is strongly associated with bears as demonstrated in the passage:

He had stolen the Belt of Wampum
From the neck of Mishe-Mokwa,
From the Great Bear of the mountains,
From the terror of the nations,
As he lay asleep and cumbrous
On the summit of the mountains,
Like a rock with mosses on it,
Spotted brown and gray with mosses.
