= Nanabozho =

Ojibwe trickster spirit often in the form of a rabbit

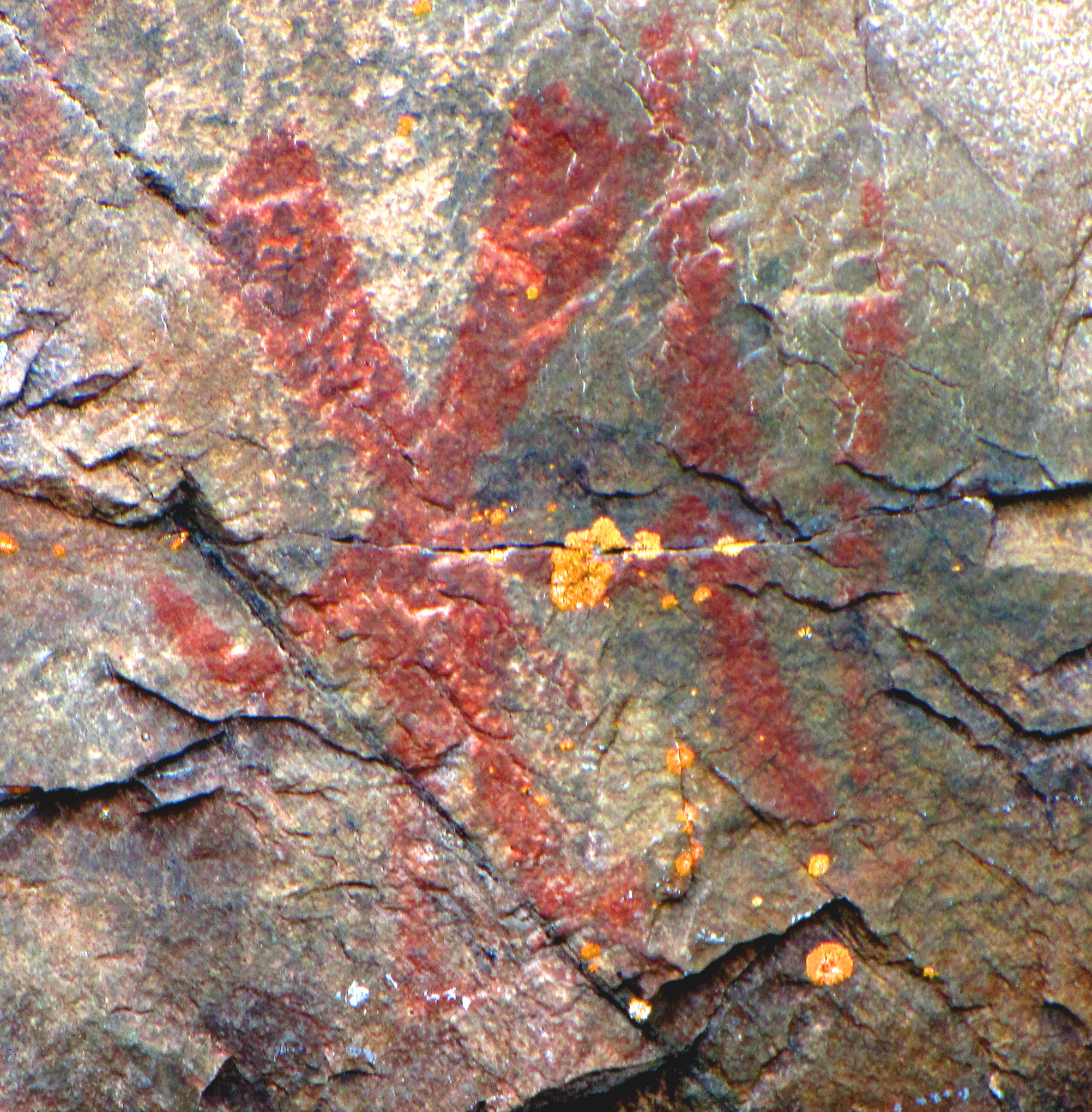
- Pictogram of Nanabozho on Mazinaw Rock, Bon Echo Provincial Park, Ontario

Creature information
- Other name(s): ᓇᓇᐳᔓ, Nanabush, Nenaboozhoo
- Folklore: Ojibwe and other First Nations

Origin
- Region: Southern Canada, and midwestern / Northern Plains United States

Nanabozho (in syllabics: ᓇᓇᐳᔓ, [nɐˌnɐbʊˈʒʊ]), also known as Nanabush, is a spirit in Anishinaabe aadizookaan (traditional storytelling), particularly among the Ojibwe of North America. Nanabozho figures prominently in their storytelling, including the story of the world's creation. Nanabozho is the Ojibwe trickster figure and culture hero (these two archetypes are often combined into a single figure in First Nations mythologies, among others).

Nanabozho can take the shape of male or female animals or humans in storytelling. Most commonly it is an animal such as a rabbit, a raven or coyote which lives near the tribe and which is cunning enough to make capture difficult.

Nanabozho is a trickster figure in many First Nation storytellings. While the use of Nanabush through storytelling can be for entertainment, it is often used as a way to pass down information and general life lessons.

== The Nanabozho spirit ==
As a trickster figure, it is often Nanabozho’s goal to create problems, which often highlight the struggles many Native people experience. According to Anishinaabe scholar Leanne Simpson, for instance, Nanabush often experiments with capitalistic means. They can be greedy, manipulative, and money driven. Because of their worldly desires, chaos often ensues. However, by developing deep relationships with others, Nanabozho becomes more balanced. Furthermore, as Nanabozho becomes more receptive to their surroundings, Nanabozho is able to create the ideal of decolonization through learned consent, recognition, and reciprocity. Therefore, the stories of Nanabush are used to guide people through life experiences and teach moral lessons.

=== Shapeshifting ===
Nanabozho is a shapeshifter who is both zoomorphic as well as anthropomorphic, meaning that Nanabozho can take the shape of animals or humans in storytelling. Thus Nanabush takes many different forms in storytelling, often changing depending on the tribe. The majority of storytelling depicts Nanabozho through a zoomorphic lens. In the Arctic and sub-Arctic, the trickster is usually called Raven. Coyote is present in the area of California, Oregon, the inland plateau, the Great Basin, and the Southwest and Southern Plains. Rabbit or Hare is the trickster figure in the Southeast, and Spider is in the northern plains. Meanwhile, Wolverine and Jay are the trickster in parts of Canada. Often, Nanabozho takes the shape of these animals because of their frequent presence among tribes. The animals listed above have similar behavioral patterns. For example, they all live near human settlements and are very cunning, enough so as to be captured with great difficulty.

== Stories ==
Nanabozho is one of four sons from what some historical and religious scholars have interpreted as spirits of directions. He has a human mother, and E-bangishimog ("In the West"), a spirit father.

Nanabozho most often appears in the shape of a rabbit and is characterized as a trickster. In his rabbit form, he is called Mishaabooz ("Great rabbit" or "Hare") or Gitchii-waabooz ("Big rabbit"). He was sent to Earth by Gitche Manidoo to teach the Ojibwe. One of his first tasks was to name all the plants and animals. Nanabozho is considered to be the founder of Midewiwin. He is the inventor of fishing and hieroglyphs. This historical figure is a shapeshifter and a co-creator of the world. In this he is called Michabo Ovisaketchak ("the Great Hare who created the Earth").

=== Fight with Paul Bunyan ===
A relatively recent series of Ojibwe legends describe Nanabozho's encounter with folkloric lumberjack Paul Bunyan, who originated among Canadian loggers in the 1800s.

Along Bunyan's path of deforestation, Nanabozho confronts Bunyan in Minnesota and implores him to leave the state without logging any more timber. A fight ensues and they battle for forty days and forty nights. Nanabozho ends the fight by slapping Bunyan across the face with a giant walleye fish. After this, Bunyan "stumbles, [and] Nanabozho pulls at Paul’s whiskers, making him promise to leave the area." Another source for the legends add a portion in which Bunyan lands on his rear end at the end of the battle, creating Red Lake with the shape of his buttocks.

This story claims to explain why Bunyan is beardless and facing west in the Lake Bemidji statue. A nearby statue of a Native American figure that had locally acquired the name Nanabozho was actually a 1960s Muffler Man statue. It was taken down in 2025.

== Similar characters in other Native cultures ==
Among the eastern Algonquian peoples located north of the Abenaki areas, a similar character to Nanabozho existed called Tcakabesh in the Algonquin language, Chikapash among the eastern James Bay Crees, Chaakaapaas by the Naskapi, Tshakapesh in the Innu language and Tcikapec in the Atikamekw language, changing to various animal forms to various human forms (adult to child) and to various mythical animals such as the Great Porcupine, or Big Skunk. He conquered or diminished these mythical animals to smaller size after killing or changing them with his trickery or shapeshifting. Among the Meskwaki, Wīsakehā serves a similar role, as does Wisakedjak among northern Algonquian peoples and for the Saulteaux in the Great Plains. The Lakota had a similar figure known as 'Iktomi.' The Abenaki-influenced Algonquin had a similar figure called Kanòjigàbe (Fiero spelling: Ganoozhigaabe; Abenaki Gluskabe; English Glooscap).

== Nanabozho name variations ==
The Nanabozho name varies in the Ojibwe language depending on whether it is presented with a first-person prefix n- (i.e. Nanabozho), third-person prefix w- (i.e. Wanabozho), or null-person prefix m- (i.e. Manabozho); the "Manabozho" form of the name is most commonly associated with Menominee language version of these stories. In addition, depending on the story and the narrator's role in telling the story, the name may be presented in its regular nominative form (with the final o, i.e. Nanabozho) or in its vocative form (without the final o, i.e. Nanabozh). Due to the way the two o sounds, they are often each realized as oo (i.e. Nanaboozhoo). In some dialects, zh is realized as z. These variations allow for associating the name with the word for "rabbit(-)" (waabooz(o-)).

Due to the placement of word stress, determined by metrical rules that define a characteristic iambic metrical foot, in which a weak syllable is followed by a strong syllable, in some dialects the weak syllable may be reduced to a schwa (ə), which may be recorded as either i or e (e.g. Winabozho or Wenabozho if the first weak syllable is graphically shown, Nanabizho if the second weak syllable is graphically shown).

In addition, though the Fiero double-vowel system uses zh, the same sound in other orthographies can be realized as j in the Algonquin system or š (or sh) in the Saulteaux-Cree system (e.g. Nanabozho v. Nanabojo). To this mix, depending on if the transcriber used French or English, the Anishinaabe name may be transcribed to fit the phonetic patterns of one of the two said languages (e.g. "Winnaboujou" and "Nanabijou": French rendering of Winabozho and Nanabizho respectively, or "Nanabush": English rendering of Nanabozh).

Like the transcription variations found among "Nanabozho," often Mishaabooz is transcribed into French as Michabous and represented in English as Michabou. Additional name variations include "Winneboujou, Winabojo, Wenabozho, Wenaboozhoo, Waynaboozhoo, Wenebojo, Nanaboozhoo, Nanabojo, Nanabushu, Nanabush, Nanapush, Nenabush, Nenabozho, Nanabosho, Manabush, Manabozho, Manibozho, Nanahboozho, Minabozho, Manabus, Manibush, Manabozh, Manabozo, Manabozho, Manabusch, Manabush, Manabus, Menabosho, Nanaboojoo, Nanaboozhoo, Nanaboso, Nanabosho, Nenabuc, Amenapush, Ne-Naw-bo-zhoo, Kwi-wi-sens Nenaw-bo-zhoo [...] Michabo, Michabou, Michabous, Michaboo, Mishabo, Michabo, Misabos, Misabooz," and "Messou."

== In popular culture ==
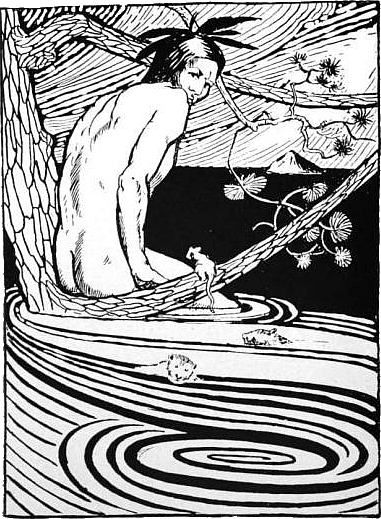
Nanabozho in the flood. (Illustration by R.C. Armour, from his book North American Indian Fairy Tales, Folklore and Legends, 1905)

Henry Wadsworth Longfellow's epic poem The Song of Hiawatha (1855) is adapted from several Nanabozho stories, along with Longfellow's own inventions. However, the poem has little to do with the historical or legendary Hiawatha.

Nanabozho is featured, as "Nanabozo", in the form of a trickster rabbit in the Swiss bandes dessinées series Yakari, e.g. Yakari et Nanabozo (1978).

Motorcycles and Sweetgrass, a novel by Drew Hayden Taylor, contains a contemporary depiction of Nanabozho. Published in 2010, the trickster is portrayed as a white man who charms his way into an Indigenous family living on the Otter Lake reserve.

The novel Moon of the Crusted Snow by Waubeshig Rice contains a retelling of a story involving Nanabozho. Published in 2018, the spirit is called by the name Nanabush and is involved in a retelling of the story "Nanabush and the Wild Geese".

== See also ==
- Aayaase
- Glooscap
- Wisakedjak
- Odziozo
- Tabaldak
- Naniboujou Club Lodge
- Sleeping Giant (Ontario)
- Winneboujou, Wisconsin
