= Nokomis, Virginia =

Unincorporated community in Virginia, US

Coordinates: 37°56′39″N 76°28′48″W

Nokomis is an unincorporated community in Northumberland County, in the U.S. state of Virginia.
