= Ask-wee-da-eed =

Ask-wee-da-eed is a Native American mythological figure of the Algonquin Abenaki people. It is an embodiment of fire associated with comets and meteors, and brings bad luck and misfortune.
