= Aldar kose =

Kazakh folk fairy tale character

Aldar kose, (native name Kazakh: Алдар көсе/Aldar köse) is a Kazakh folk fairy tale and name of main character. He is the collective image of the sly but very kind man. In fairy tales he is a swindler, cheating the greedy rich, evil Khans and helping the poor and weak people. The Historical Dictionary of Kazakhstan refers to him as a "creative liar".

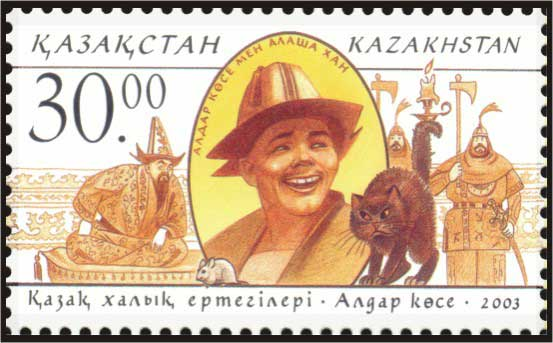
Postage stamp of Kazakhstan with Aldar kose, 2003

== In theatre and film ==
A play Aldar-Kose, a folk-comedy by Shakhmet Khusainov, was published in the early 1940s. In 1964 a Soviet film simply entitled Aldar-Kose was produced by Sh. Aimanov. In Turkmenistan a children's film, Prikluchenia Aldar-Kose (The Adventures of Aldar Kose), was released in 1970.

- "Aldar-Kose / Shaven Impostor" (1964)
- . Aldar-Kose (cartoon, 1976)
- . As Aldar-Kose outwitted tiger (animation, 1976)
- . "Aldar-Kose" (2011)
- .Animation Series "Aldar Kösenіñ köñіldі oqigalary" - 83 series. Production Studio Azia Animation (2009-2011) Authors: Igor Kraus and Arthur Kraus.
