= Glooscap =

Legendary figure of the Wabanaki peoples in the United States and Canada

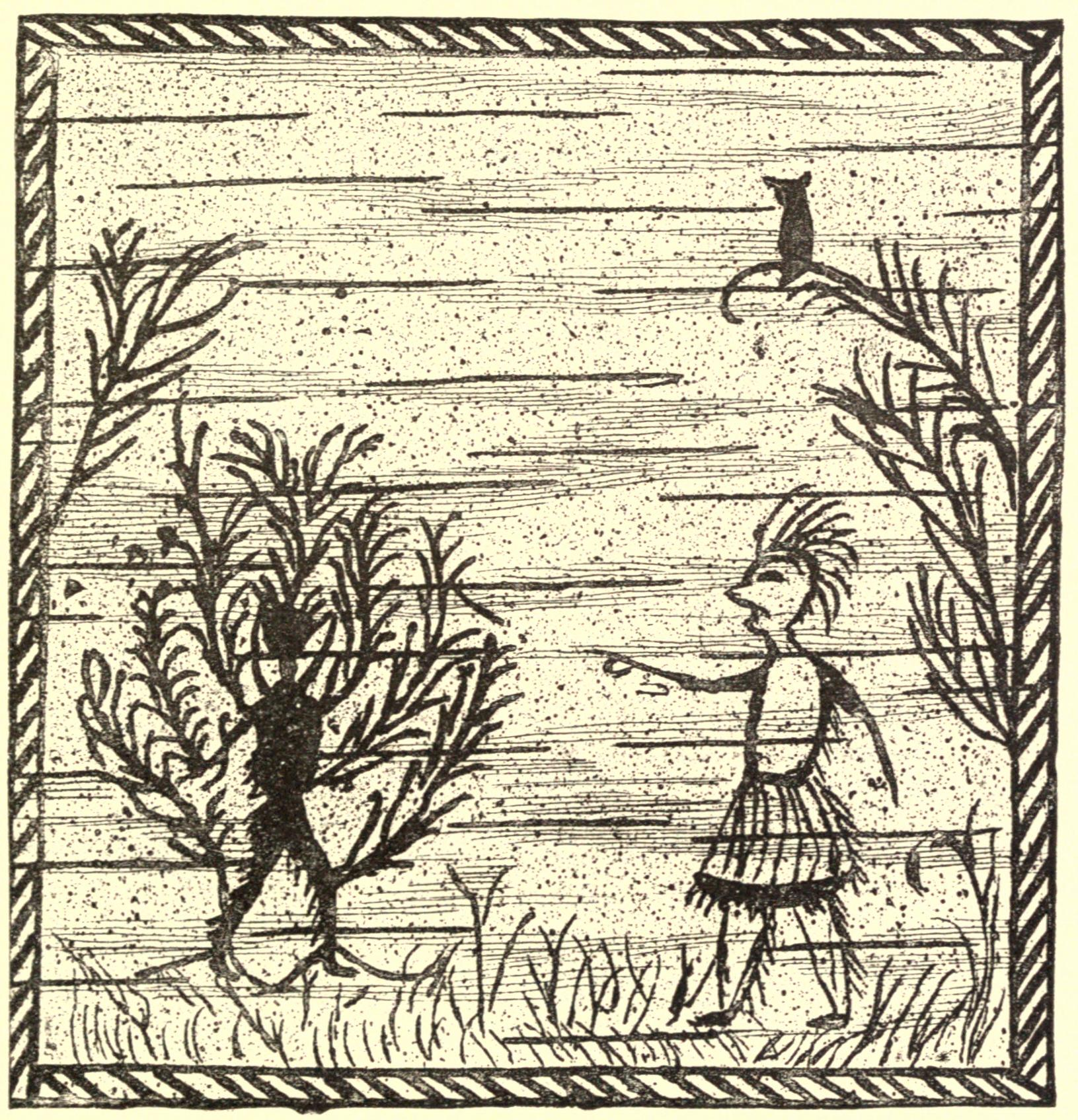
Glooscap turning man into a cedar tree. Scraping on birchbark by Tomah Joseph 1884

Glooscap (variant forms and spellings Gluskabe, Glooskap, Gluskabi, Kluskap, Kluscap, Kloskomba, or Gluskab) is a legendary figure of the Wabanaki peoples, native peoples located in Vermont, New Hampshire, Maine and Atlantic Canada. The stories were first recorded by Silas Tertius Rand and then by Charles Godfrey Leland in the 19th century.

In his role as creator, Glooscap is similar to that of the Ojibwa Nanabozho and the Cree Wisakedjak. There are variations to the legend of Glooscap as each tribe of the Wabanaki adapted the legend to their own region. At the same time, there are consistencies in the legend with Glooscap always portrayed as "kind, benevolent, a warrior against evil and the possessor of magical powers".

== Abenaki ==
The Abenaki people believe that after Tabaldak created humans, the dust from his body created Glooscap and his twin brother, Malsumis. He gave Glooscap the power to create a good world. Malsumis, on the other hand, is the opposite, and seeks evil to this day.

Glooscap learned that hunters who kill too much would destroy the good world he had sought to create. Frightened at this possibility, Glooscap sought Grandmother Woodchuck (Agaskw) and asked her for advice. She plucked all the hairs out of her belly (hence the lack of hair on a woodchuck's belly) and wove them into a magical bag. Glooscap put all the game animals into the river. He then bragged to Grandmother Woodchuck that the humans would never need to hunt again. Grandmother Woodchuck scolded him and told him that they would die without the animals. She said that they needed to hunt to remain strong. Glooscap then let the animals go.

Later, Glooscap decided to capture the great bird that Tabaldak had placed on a mountain peak, where it generated bad weather in the flapping of its wings. Glooscap caught the eagle and bound its wings and the winds ceased. Soon, the air was so hot and heavy that Glooscap could not breathe, so he loosened the bird's wings, just enough to generate enough weather so humanity could live.

== Mi'kmaq ==
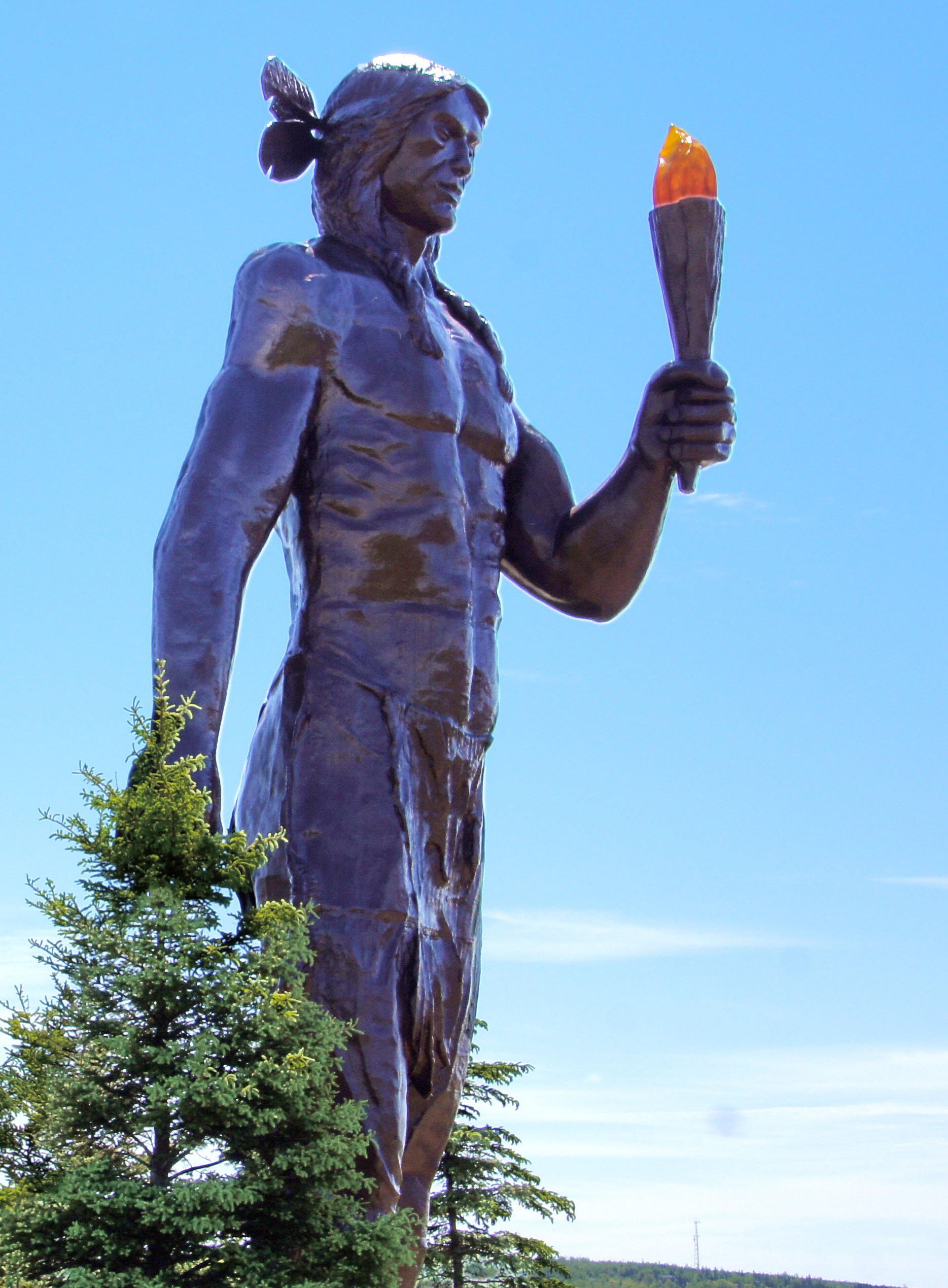
Glooscap monument, Millbrook First Nation, Nova Scotia

In one version of the Mi'kmaq creation story, Glooscap laid on his back, with arms outstretched to the north and south and his head toward the rising sun. He was in this position for 365 days and nights. Then, Nogami, the grandmother, was born as an old woman from the dew of the rock. The next day, Nataoa-nsen, Nephew, was born from the foam of the sea. On the next day was born the Mother of all the Mi'kmaq, from the plants of the Earth.

Glooscap was said by the Mi'kmaq to be great in size and in powers, and to have created natural features such as the Annapolis Valley. In carrying out his feats, he often had to overcome his evil twin brother who wanted rivers to be crooked and mountain ranges to be impassable; in one legend, he turns the evil twin into stone. Another common story is how he turned himself into a giant beaver and created five islands in the Bay of Fundy, Nova Scotia by slapping his huge tail in the water with enough force to stir up the earth. His home was said to be Cape Blomidon.

Yet another legend says that when Glooscap finished painting the splendor of the world, he dipped his brush into a blend of all the colors and created Abegweit, meaning "Cradled on the Waves"—his favorite island (Prince Edward Island). When Glooscap slept, Nova Scotia was his bed, and Prince Edward Island his pillow.

Another legend tells how Glooscap saved the world from an evil frog-monster, who had swallowed all the Earth's water. Glooscap killed the monster and the water was released. Some animals, relieved at the resurgence of water, jumped in and became fish and other aquatic animals.

Glooscap is also believed to have brought the Mi'kmaq earthenware, knowledge of good and evil, fire, tobacco, fishing nets, and canoes, making him a Culture hero.

The Mi'kmaq community Glooscap First Nation is named in honor of Glooscap.

== Cultural influence ==
In addition to being a spiritual figure, Glooscap also became a major figure of regional identity for the Bay of Fundy region with everything from steam locomotives, the ship Glooscap, schools, businesses and the Glooscap Trail tourism region named after the heroic figure.

The animated series Lil Glooscap and the Legends of Turtle Island premiered in 2022 on APTN.

== See also ==
- Abenaki mythology
- Glooscap First Nation
- Nanabozho
- Odziozo
- Tabaldak
- Wisakedjak
