= Nokomis, Alabama =

Unincorporated community in Alabama, United States

- Unincorporated community
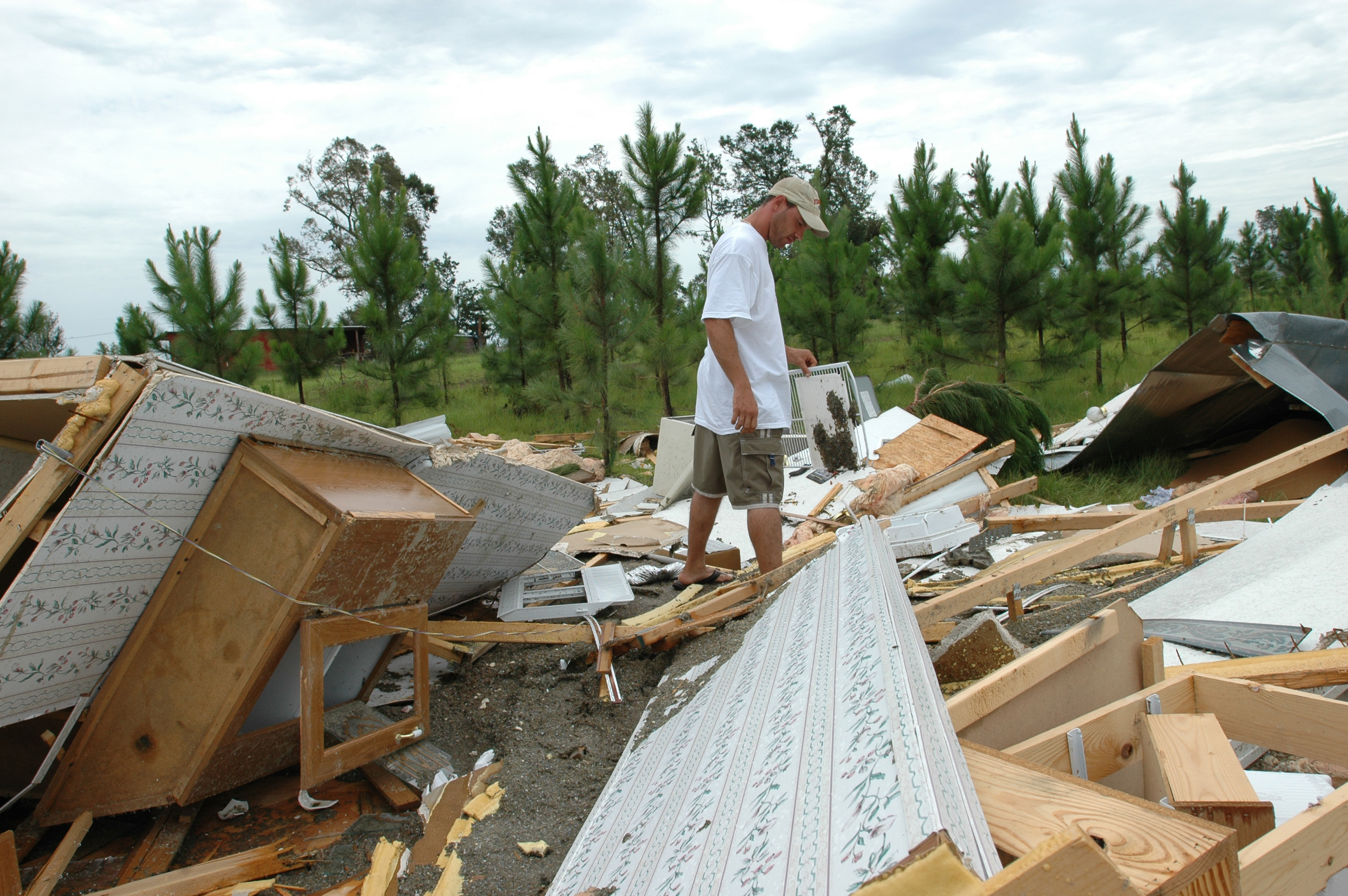
- A homeowner looks through what is left of his home after Hurricane Dennis caused severe damage, 2005

- Location within Alabama Location within the United States
- Coordinates: 31°00′37″N 87°33′53″W
- Country: United States
- State: Alabama
- County: Escambia
- Elevation: 272 ft (83 m)
- Time zone: UTC-6 (Central (CST))
  - Summer (DST): UTC-5 (CDT)
- Area code: 251
- GNIS feature ID: 155179

Nokomis is an unincorporated community in Escambia County, Alabama, United States. Nokomis is located along U.S. Route 31 and a CSX Transportation line 4.3 miles (6.9 km) west-southwest of Atmore. Nokomis has the distinction of having boundaries in three U.S. counties: Escambia, Alabama; Escambia, Florida; and Baldwin, Alabama.

== Community Information ==
Nokomis is a suburb of Atmore, with one fire station, one church and three businesses.

== Notable person ==
- Albert Murray, writer and critic, was born in Nokomis
