= Tabaldak =

Tabaldak is the androgynous creator among the Abenaki and Algonquian people of northeastern North America. Their name means "The Owner" who "created all living things but one". Tabaldak created people out of stones, but thought these people's hearts were too cold. They broke up these stones and left them scattered over the Abenaki land. Next they tried wood, and out of these came the Abenaki people.

The only creature Tabaldak did not create was Odzihodo, whose name means "He Makes Himself from Something." Initially Odzihodo only had his hand, and as he was not a creator of things, required help from Tabaldak. By the time he was fully formed, Odzihodo had already transformed the world to his vision.

To do this, he piled dirt to make mountains, and dug lines for rivers. He took great care in forming Lake Champlain, and happy with his work, turned into a stone.
