= Aki (name) =

Aki (あき, Aki) is a surname, a given name, and a nickname. Aki is a common Japanese, Finnish and Nigerian given name. Aki is also a Japanese surname.

== Written forms in Japanese ==
Forms in kanji can include:

- あき, hiragana
- アキ, katakana
- 明, 'bright'
- 燦, 'brilliant, bright, radiance'
- 昭, 'shining'
- 秋, 'autumn'
- 彬, 'refined, gentle'
- 爽, 'refreshing, bracing, resonant, sweet'
- 晶, 'sparkle'
- 暁, 'daybreak'
- 彰, 'acknowledge'
- 晃, 'clear'
- 亜紀, 'follow, chronicle'
- 亜希, 'follow, hope'
- 愛希, 'love, hope'

== In Finnish ==
In Finnish, Aki is a diminutive form of Joakim, which is cognate with the English Joachim.

== People ==
=== Given name ===
Aki
- Gender: (Finland) (Nigeria) Male (Japan) Unisex

Origin
- Origin: Japanese, Finnish, and Nigerian

Other names
- See also: Akiko; Akina; Akie; Akseli; Aukusti; Joakim

- Aki Avni (born 1967), Israeli actor, entertainer and television host
- Aki Berg (born 1977), Finnish ice hockey player
- Aki Cederberg (born 1978), Finnish writer, musician and filmmaker
- Aki Collins, American basketball player
- Aki Deguchi (出口 陽; born 1988), Japanese singer, known professionally as Aki
- Aki Hakala, Finnish drummer of The Rasmus
- Aki Hata (畑 亜貴; born 1966), Japanese musician and lyricist
- Aki Heikkinen (born 1980), Finnish decathlete
- Aki Heiskanen (born 1952), Finnish footballer
- Aki Higashihara (東原 亜希; born 1982), Japanese television personality, fashion model, and gravure idol
- Aki-Matilda Høegh-Dam (born 1996), Danish-Greenlandic politician
- Aki Hoshino (ほしの あき; born 1977), Japanese gravure idol
- Aki Hyryläinen (born 1968), Finnish footballer and coach
- Aki Ichijo (born 1969), Japanese basketball player
- Aki Inomata (あき いのまた; born 1983), Japanese multidisciplinary contemporary artist and designer
- Aki Irie (入江 亜季), Japanese manga artist
- Aki Jones (1982–2014), American football player
- Aki Juusela (born 1991), Finnish ice hockey player
- Aki Kangasmäki (born 1989), Finnish ice hockey player
- Aki Karvonen (born 1957), Finnish cross-country skier
- Aki Kaurismäki (born 1957), Finnish screenwriter and film director
- Aki Kawamura (川村亜紀; born 1980), Japanese gravure idol
- Aki Kivelä (born 1992), Finnish ice hockey player
- Aki Kondo (born 1977), Japanese illustrator and character designer
- Aki Korhonen (born 1975), Finnish ice hockey player
- Aki Kuroda (黒田 アキ; born 1944), Japanese-French painter
- Aki Kurose (1925–1998), American teacher and social justice activist
- Aki Lahti (1931–1998), Finnish chess player
- Aki Lahtinen (born 1958), Finnish footballer
- Aki Lindén (born 1952), Finnish politician
- Aki Linnanahde, Finnish television and radio personality
- Aki Maeda (前田亜季; born 1985), Japanese actress and singer
- Aki Maeda, a member of the J-pop group MAX from 2002 to 2008
- Aki Misato (美郷 あき; born 1981), Japanese singer
- Aki Mitsugi (三津木晶; born 1987), Japanese contemporary artist
- Aki Mitsuhashi (三橋 亜記; born 1989), Japanese field hockey player
- Aki Mizusawa (水沢 アキ; born 1954), Japanese actress, model, and singer
- Aki Mukai (向井 亜紀; born 1964), Japanese actress
- Aki Momii (籾井 あき; born 2000), Japanese volleyball player
- Aki Nagatomi (永富 有紀; born 1969), Japanese volleyball player
- Aki Narula (born 1968), Indian fashion designer, costume designer, and wardrobe stylist
- Aki Nawa (名和 秋; born 1979), Japanese bowler
- Aki Ogawa (born 1975), Japanese wheelchair curler
- Aki Ollikainen (born 1973), Finnish novelist
- Aki Orr (1931–2013), Israeli writer and political activist
- Aki Parviainen (born 1974), Finnish javelin thrower
- Aki Ra (born c. 1973), Cambodian landmine disposal expert and former Khmer Rouge conscripted child soldier
- Aki Rahunen (born 1971), Finnish tennis player
- Aki Riihilahti (born 1976), Finnish footballer
- Aki Roberge (born c. 1973), Japanese-American astrophysicist
- Aki Sasamoto (笹本 晃; born 1980), Japanese-American artist
- Aki Sawada (澤田 亜紀; born 1988), Japanese figure skater
- Aki Schilz, British writer, poet and editor
- Aki Seitsonen (born 1986), Finnish ice hockey player
- Aki Seiuli (born 1992), New Zealand rugby union player
- Aki Shibahara, Japanese musician, member of the British indie pop band Warm Jets
- Aki Shibata (芝田安希; born 1981), Japanese volleyball player
- Aki Shimazaki (born 1954), Japanese-Canadian novelist and translator
- Aki Shimizu (志水 アキ), Japanese manga artist
- Aki Sirkesalo (1962–2004), Finnish musician
- Aki Sudo (須藤 亜貴; born 1975), Japanese ice hockey player
- Aki Takahashi (高橋 アキ; born 1944), Japanese pianist
- Aki Takajo (高城 亜樹; born 1991), Japanese singer and actress
- Aki Takase (高瀬 アキ; born 1948), Japanese jazz pianist and composer
- Aki Takayama (高山亜樹; born 1970), Japanese synchronized swimmer
- Aki Takejo (あき竹城; 1947–2022), Japanese actress and comedian
- Aki Tammisto (1915–1978), Finnish sprinter
- Aki Thomas (born 1979), American college basketball coach
- Aki Tonoike (外ノ池 亜希; born 1979), Japanese speed skater
- Aki Toyosaki (豊崎 愛生; born 1986), Japanese voice actress
- Aki Tsuchida (土田 亜希; born 1979), Japanese ice hockey player
- Aki Ulander (born 1981), Finnish basketball player
- Aki Uusikartano (born 1977), Finnish footballer
- Aki Wada (和田 あき; born 1997), Japanese shogi player
- Aki Yamada (山田 明季; born 1992), Japanese field hockey player
- Aki Yanagisawa (柳沢 亜紀), Japanese soprano
- Aki Yashiro (八代亜紀; 1950–2023), Japanese singer and painter
- Aki Yazawa (矢澤 亜希; born 1991), Japanese slalom canoeist
- Aki Yli-Salomäki (born 1972), Finnish composer, music critic, and music journalist

=== Nickname or stage name ===
- Aki Aleong (1934–2025), Trinidadian-American actor, singer, songwriter and record producer
- Akihiro Ienaga (家長 昭博; born 1986), Japanese football player commonly referred to as "Aki"
- Akinori Iwamura (岩村 明憲; born 1979), Japanese baseball player and manager referred to as "Aki" while playing in Major League Baseball
- Aki Kumar (born 1980), Indian-born American blues musician
- Aki Kuroda (黒田 アキ; born 1944), Japanese painter
- Aki Nawaz (born 1961), British rapper and musician born Haq Nawaz Qureshi
- Alfred Schmidt (1935–2016), German football player and manager
- Aki (rapper), real name Aleksi Swallow, Swedish rapper with Swedish hip hop band Labyrint

=== Surname ===
- Angela Aki (アンジェラ・アキ; born 1977), Japanese singer-songwriter
- Bundee Aki (born 1990), New Zealand-Irish rugby union player
- Izumi Aki (亜希 いずみ; born 1960), Japanese pink film actress
- Keiiti Aki (安芸 敬一; 1930–2005), Japanese-American geophysicist and professor
- Tong Kee or T. Aki (died 1887), Chinese immigrant businessman in the Kingdom of Hawaii involved in the Aki opium scandal
- Yoko Aki (阿木 燿子; born 1945), Japanese songwriter, actress, novelist and essayist

== Fictional and legendary characters ==
- Aki the Wealthy, a 10th-century Dane in the medieval Icelandic Egil's Saga
- Aki (James Bond), from the James Bond film You Only Live Twice played by Akiko Wakabayashi
- Aki Adagaki (安達垣 愛姫), in Masamune-kun's Revenge
- Aki Hayakawa (早川アキ), from the manga series Chainsaw Man
- Akiza Izinski, or Aki Izayoi from Yu-Gi-Oh! 5D's
- Aki Kimura, from Medabots
- Aki Kino, from Inazuma Eleven
- Aki Mikage, twin brother of Aya Mikage from Ceres: Celestial Legend
- Aki Mizuguchi, from the manga and anime series Whisper Me a Love Song
- Aki Nikkinen, from Salatut elämät
- Aki Ross, from Final Fantasy: The Spirits Within
- Aki Shiina, protagonist of Miss Caretaker of Sunohara-sou
- Aki Shirashi, protagonist of Usurper of the Sun, a novel by Hōsuke Nojiri
- Aki Tomoya, protagonist of Saekano: How to Raise a Boring Girlfriend
- Aki Wasama, from Kotikatu
- Aki Yuko, a doctor from Sky Girls
- Aki Zeta-5 (née Aki Lutinnen), leader of the Cybernetic Consciousness faction in Sid Meier's Alien Crossfire
- Aki, one of the seven daughters of the evil demon Aku, specifically trained to destroy Samurai Jack
- A.K.I., from the video game series Street Fighter
- Aki Nijou, from Maken-Ki!
- Shizuha and Minoriko Aki, sister characters in Mountain of Faith from the video game series Touhou Project

== See also ==
- Aki (disambiguation)
- Akki (name)
