= List of legendary creatures (A) =

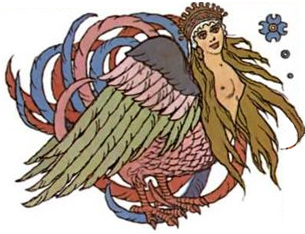
Ivan Bilibin's Alkonost

The Egyptian Ammit, who eats the wicked dead in the afterlife, has the body of a lion and hippopotamus and the head of a crocodile.

1. Á Bao A Qu (Malay) – Entity that lives in the Tower of Victory in Chitor.
2. Aatxe (Basque) – Bull spirit.
3. Abaasy (Yakuts) – Iron-toothed demons.
4. Abada (African) – Unicorn that inhabits the African Congo.
5. Äbädä (Tatar) – Forest spirit.
6. Abaia (Melanesia) – Huge magical eel.
7. Abarimon (Medieval Bestiaries) – Savage humanoid with backward feet.
8. Abath (Malay) – One-horned animal.
9. Abumi-guchi (Japanese) – Furry creature from an animated stirrup, usually from a mounted soldier who fell in battle
10. Abura-sumashi (Japanese) – Creature from a mountain pass in Kumamoto Prefecture.
11. Abzar iyesi (Turkic) – Household spirit
12. Acephali (Greek) – Headless humanoids.
13. Acheri (Hindu) – Disease-bringing ghost.
14. Achiyalabopa (Pueblo) – Huge bird god.
15. Achlis (Roman) – Curious elk.
16. Adar Llwch Gwin (Welsh) – Giant birds that understand human languages.
17. Adaro (Solomon Islands) – Malevolent merfolk.
18. Adhene (Manx) – Nature spirit.
19. Adlet (Inuit) – Vampiric dog-human hybrid
20. Adroanzi (Lugbara) – Nature spirit.
21. Adze (Ewe people) – African vampiric-forest being.
22. Aerico (Greek) – Disease demon.
23. Æsir (Norse) – Norse deities.
24. Aeternae (Greek) – Saw-horned monster.
25. Afanc (Welsh) – Lake monster (exact lake varies by story).
26. Agadzagadza (Nigerian) – Lizard trickster figure in Bura mythology.
27. Agni (Hindu) – God of fire and sacrifices.
28. Agathodaemon (Greek) – Spirit of vinefields and grainfields.
29. Agloolik (Inuit) – Ice spirit that aids hunters and fishermen.
30. Agogwe (East Africa) – Small, ape-like humanoid.
31. Akhekh (Ancient Egypt) – Draconic oryx-bird hybrid that brings chaos.
32. Ahkiyyini (Inuit) – Animated skeleton that causes shipwrecks.
33. Ahuizotl (Aztec) – Anthropophagous dog-monkey hybrid.
34. Ahura (Zoroastrianism) – Zoroastrian spirits.
35. Aigamuxa (Khoikhoi) – Anthropophagous humanoid with eyes in its instep.
36. Aigikampoi (Etruscan) – Fish-tailed goat.
37. Airavata (Hindu) – Divine elephant.
38. Aitu (Polynesian) – Malevolent spirits or demons.
39. Aitvaras (Lithuanian) – Household spirit.
40. Ajatar (Finnish) – Dragon/snake female spirit, is said to spread diseases
41. Akateko (Japanese) – Tree-dwelling monster.
42. Akerbeltz (Basque) – Billy goat spirit.
43. Akhlut (Inuit) – Orca-wolf shapeshifter.
44. Akka (Finnish) – Female spirits or minor goddesses.
45. Akki (Japanese) – Large, grotesque humanoid.
46. Akkorokamui (Ainu) – Sea monster.
47. Akuma (Japanese) – Evil spirit or devil
48. Akupara (Hindu) – Giant turtle that supports the world.
49. Akurojin-no-hi (Japanese) – Ghostly flame which causes disease.
50. Al (Armenian and Persian) – Spirit that steals unborn babies and livers from pregnant women.
51. Ala (Slavic) – Bad weather demon.
52. Alal (Chaldean) – Queen of the full moon.
53. Alan (Philippine) – Winged humanoid that steals reproductive waste to make children.
54. Al Ana (Turkic) – Female spirit that kidnaps human children and replaces them with her own.
55. Alce (Heraldic) – Wingless griffin.
56. Aleya (Bengali) – Spirit of a dead fisherman.
57. Alicanto (Chilean) – Bird that eats gold and silver.
58. Alicorn (Bestiario medieval) – Winged unicorn.
59. Alkonost (Slavic) – Angelic bird with human head and breasts.
60. Allocamelus (Heraldic) – Ass-camel hybrid.
61. Almas (Mongolian) – Savage humanoid.
62. Al-mi'raj (Islamic) – One-horned rabbit.
63. Aloja (Catalan) – Female water spirit.
64. Alom-bag-winno-sis (Abenaki) – Little people and tricksters.
65. Alp (German) – Male night-demon.
66. Alphyn (Heraldic) – Lion-like creature, sometimes with dragon or goat forelegs.
67. Alp-luachra (Irish) – Parasitic fairy.
68. Al Rakim (Islamic) – Guard dog of the Seven Sleepers.
69. Alseid (Greek) – Grove nymph.
70. Alû (Assyrian) – Leprous demon.
71. Alux (Mayan) – Little people.
72. Amaburakosagi (Japanese) – Ritual disciplinary demon from Shikoku.
73. Amala (Tsimshian) – Giant who holds up the world.
74. Amamehagi (Japanese) – Ritual disciplinary demon from Hokuriku.
75. Amanojaku (Japanese) – Small demon.
76. Amarok (Inuit) – Giant wolf.
77. Amarum (Quechua) – Water boa spirit.
78. Amazake-babaa (Japanese) – Disease-causing hag.
79. Amemasu (Ainu) – Lake monster.
80. Amikuk (Yup'ik) – Shapeshifter that swims in water and land.
81. Ammit (Ancient Egyptian) – Female demon who was part lion, hippopotamus and crocodile and devoured the souls of the wicked.
82. Amorōnagu (Japanese) – Tennyo from the island of Amami Ōshima.
83. Amphiptere (Heraldic) – Winged serpent.
84. Amphisbaena (Greek) – Serpent with a head at each end.
85. Anak (Jewish) – Giant.
86. Anansi (Akan) – Half human half spider trickster diety from Akan folklore.
87. Andean wolf (Argentina) – Mountain wolf
88. Androsphinx (Ancient Egyptian) – Human-headed sphinx.
89. Angel (mainly Christian, Jewish, Islamic traditions) – Divine beings of Heaven who act as mediators between God and humans; the counterparts of Demons.
90. Anggitay (Philippine) – The Philippine counterpart to the centuaride.
91. Anqa (Arabian) – Giant mythical female bird similar to a phoenix.
92. Ani Hyuntikwalaski (Cherokee) – Lightning spirit.
93. Ankou (French) – Skeletal grave watcher with a lantern and scythe.
94. Anmo (Japanese) – Ritual disciplinary demon from Iwate Prefecture.
95. Antaeus (Greek) – Giant who was extremely strong as long as he remained in contact with the ground.
96. Anubis (Ancient Egyptian) – God of funerals
97. Antero Vipunen (Finnish) – Subterranean giant.
98. Anthropomorphic Animals (Worldwide) – Humanoid Animals
99. Anzû (Sumerian) – Divine storm bird
100. Ao (Chinese) – Giant turtle.
101. Ao Ao (Guaraní) – Anthropophagous peccary or sheep.
102. Aobōzu (Japanese) – Blue monk who kidnaps children.
103. Apkallu (Sumerian) – Fish-human hybrid that attends the god Enki.
104. Apophis (Ancient Egyptian) – The Serpent Diety of chaos, darkness and fire.
105. Apsaras (Buddhist and Hindu) – Female cloud spirit.
106. Aqrabuamelu (Akkadian) – Human-scorpion hybrid.
107. Arachne (Greek mythology) - Centaurid, human-spider hybrid.
108. Ardat-lilî (Akkadian) – Disease demon.
109. Aralez (Armenian) – The oldest gods in the Armenian pantheon
110. Archura (Turkic) – Shapeshifting woodland spirit
111. Argus Panoptes (Greek) – Hundred-eyed giant.
112. Arikura-no-baba (Japanese) – Old woman with magical powers.
113. Arimaspi (Greek) – One-eyed humanoid.
114. Arion (Greek) – Swift green-maned talking horse.
115. Arkan Sonney (Manx) – Fairy hedgehog.
116. Asag (Sumerian) – Hideous rock demon.
117. Asakku (Sumerian) – Demon.
118. Asanbosam (West Africa) – Iron-toothed vampire.
119. Asena (Turkic) – Blue-maned wolf.
120. A-senee-ki-wakw (Abenaki) – Stone giant.
121. Ashi-magari (Japanese) – Invisible tendril that impedes movement.
122. Asiman (Dahomey) – Vampiric possession spirit.
123. Askefrue (Germanic) – Female tree spirit.
124. Ask-wee-da-eed (Abenaki) – Fire elemental and spectral fire.
125. Asobibi (Japanese) – Spectral fire from Kōchi Prefecture.
126. Aspidochelone (Medieval Bestiaries) – Island-sized whale or sea turtle.
127. Asrai (English) – Water spirit.
128. Astomi (Greek) – Humanoid sustained by pleasant smells instead of food.
129. Asura (Hindu) – Hindu malevolent divinities.
130. Aswang (Philippine) – Carrion-eating humanoid.
131. Atomy (English) – Surprisingly small creature.
132. Ato-oi-kozō (Japanese) – Invisible spirit that follows people.
133. Atshen (Inuit) – Anthropophagous spirit.
134. Augerino (American) - Subterranean creature.
135. Avalerion (Medieval Bestiary) – King of the birds.
136. Awa-hon-do (Abenaki) – Insect spirit.
137. Axex (Ancient Egyptian) – Falcon-lion hybrid.
138. Ayakashi (Japanese) – Sea serpent that travels over boats in an arc while dripping oil.
139. Ayakashi-no-ayashibi (Japanese) – Spectral fire from Ishikawa Prefecture.
140. Azhdaha (Persian) – Gigantic winged serpent, roughly equivalent to a dragon.
141. Aziza (Dahomey) – Little people that help hunters.
142. Azukiarai/Azukitogi (Japanese) – Spirit that washes azuki beans along riversides.
143. Azukibabaa (Japanese) – Bean-grinding hag who devours people.
