= Gallery MORYTA =

- ギャラリーモリタ
- Former name: Kazuki Gallery
- Established: 1991
- Location: Fukuoka, Japan
- Type: Gallery
- Founders: Shunichiro Morita and Hitomi Kazuki
- Public transit access: Akasaka station
- Website: g-morita.com

Gallery MORYTA is a gallery located in Fukuoka, Japan. Established in 1991, its focus lies on contemporary art. Numerous exhibitions are held every year, with works by artists like Tatsuo Ikeda, Ryosuke Yasumoto, Season Lao and Aki Mitsugi. The gallery is a cultural hub, hosting events such as live music shows and artist' talks. The ART FAIR ASIA FUKUOKA, held yearly, is one of its initiatives. The gallery participates in fairs in both Japan and overseas.

== History ==
The gallery was established on Keyaki Street in 1991, initially under the name Gallery Kazuki by Shunichiro Morita and Hitomi Kazuki. In February 2006, the name was officially changed to Gallery MORYTA. In 2011, another gallery by the name of Gallery Kazuki was opened in Ginza, Tokyo.

== Exhibitions ==
Since its establishment, artists like Ryosuke Yasumoto, Junpei Kishida, Shinichi Saito, Chiaki Horikoshi, Yuji Kobayashi, Masakatsu Tagami, Valentino Moradei, Kai Yokota, Kenji Kobayashi, Akiko Takeuchi, Asao Kawahara, Aki Mitsugi and Zai Kuning have had their work exhibited in Gallery MORYTA. Outside of general exhibitions, Gallery MORYTA has been involved in the organization of art events in museums and public spaces. Notable examples include Chiaki Horikoshi's exhibition 'Spanish Evening' at the Kuratake Brewery in Kashima City, Saga Prefecture and at the SeaHawk Resort Hotel Sotokoto Club in 1996, Yuji Koboyashi's exhibition at the Oguni Art Village Hall in 1997, and the Japan-Korea Exchange Live Special held at Fukuoka Asian Art Museum in 2002. In 2003, the gallery organized the Chiaki Horikoshi exhibition 'He has gone over to Spain 1977' at ART GALLERY MITSUBISHI ESTATE ARTIUM.

== Music Scene ==
Besides organizing exhibitions, the gallery has been very active in the music scene. Gallery MORYTA's 1993 anniversary was celebrated with a jazz concert featuring pianist Itabashi Fumio and percussionist Yahiro Tomohiro. While Itabashi had worked with great names such as Elvin Jones and Ray Anderson in the latter half of the 80s, this concert was his first solo performance. After the success of this concert, the gallery opened up for more general events. The gallery has collaborated with numerous musicians, such as Tetsu Saitoh (contrabass), Shota Koyama (drum), Nobuyoshi Ino (contrabass), Kazutoki Umezu (sax), Takamasa Segi (siku), Yoshiro Nakamura (guitar / vocal), Shun Sakai (vocal), Hasegawa Kiyoshi (guitar / vocal), Ono Lisa (guitar / vocal), Jorge Cumbo (quena / vocal), Hugo Fattoruso (piano), Michel Doneda (sax), Barre Phillips (contrabass), Onuma Yosuke (guitar), Kosuke Atari (vocal), Pierre Barouh (guitar / vocal), Choisori (percussionist), Eiichi Hayashi (sax), Hayasaka Sachi (sax), Tagata Toshiki(bass), Agatsuma Hiromitsu (shamisen player), Masato Tomobe (folk singer) and Takateru Kudo (butoh dance) The gallery has also worked together with GAIA CUATRO, a group that consists of Yahiro Tomohiro, Kaneko Asuka (violin), Carlos Buschini (bass), and Gerardo Di Giusto (piano).
