= Ulander =

Ulander is a surname. Notable people with the surname include:

- Aki Ulander (born 1981), Finnish basketball player
- Kristina Ulander (born 1981), Swedish wheelchair curler
- Martin Ulander (born 1976), Swedish footballer

== See also ==
- Lander (surname)
