= Akki =

Akki may refer to:

- Acci, Akki in Greek Latinisation, an ancient city in Spain
- Akki, term for rice in the cuisine of Karnataka, India
- Akki, a Japanese legendary creature
- Akki (name)

== See also ==
- Aki (disambiguation)
