= Salomäki =

Surname list

Salomäki is a surname. Notable people with the surname include:

- Jouko Salomäki (born 1962), Finnish wrestler
- Miikka Salomäki (born 1993), Finnish ice hockey player
- Aki Yli-Salomäki (born 1972), Finnish composer and critic
