= Convulse (band) =

Finnish metal band

- Also known as: S.D.S.
- Origin: Nokia, Finland
- Genres: Death metal, death 'n' roll
- Years active: 1988–1994, 2012–present
- Labels: Thrash Records; Relapse Records
- Past members: Rami Jämsä; Patti (Juha Telenius); Juppo Paavola; Toni Honkala; Aki Yli-Salomäki; Janne Miikkulainen; Jani Kuhanen; Perttu Lind; Kimmo Häkkilä

Convulse is a Finnish death metal band from Nokia, active between 1988 and 1994 and again since 2012. They were one of their country's first extreme metal bands and considered by some to be the forefathers of the local 'Nokia' metal scene.

== History ==
Convulse was formed in 1988 under the name S.D.S. formed and consisted of singer and guitarist Rami Jämsä, bassist Juha "Patti" Telenius, drummer Janne Miikkulainen and guitarist Jani Kuhanen. After the group changed its name to Convulse, they released their first demo, Resuscitation of Evilness, in 1990. In 1991, Toni Honkala joined the band as the new guitarist. Through the demo, the band reached a deal with the French label Thrash Records, where the debut album World Without God was released. The single Lost Equilibrium followed in 1993 on Relapse Records. Then the recordings for the second album Reflections began. The work on this took place within a week in December 1992 at the Sunlight Studios in Sweden. In 1993, the band members enlisted in their mandatory military service before the album was released in the summer of 1994 after some delay via Relapse Records. They later broke up in the same year.

In 2012, Convulse was reformed and played some gigs in Finland. They were also confirmed for 2013's Maryland Deathfest. The band now consists of guitarist/vocalist Rami Jämsä, bass player Olli Heino and drummer Matias Rokio.

== Legacy ==
In 2010, Denise Falzon of Exclaim! wrote: "Finland's Convulse are one of those old school extreme metal bands that helped define the genre, yet weren't fully appreciated in their time, and their career was so short-lived hardly anyone remembers them."

== Members ==
2026 line-up:

- Rami Jämsä - guitar and vocals
- Olli Heino - bass
- Matias Rokio - drums

Previous members

- Juha Telenius - bass 1988-1994 and 2012-2025
- Janne Miikkulainen - drums 1988-1993
- Jani Kuhanen - guitar 1989-1991
- Rolle Markos -drums 2012-2024
- Perttu Lind - drums 1994
- Kimmo Häkkilä - vocals 1994
- Aki Y.S. 1994
- Tomi Ylönen drums 2021 (session)

== Discography ==
Demos

- Rehearsal (1990)
- Resuscitation of Evilness (1990)
- Promo 1992 (1992)

Studio albums

- World Without God (1991)
- Reflections (1994)
- Evil Prevails (2013)
- Cycle of Revenge (2016)
- Deathstar (2020)

EPs

- Inner Evil (2013)

Singles

- Lost Equilibrium (1993)
