= Akki (name) =

Akki is a surname, a given name and a nickname that may refer to the following people:

== Surname ==
- Gaurish Akki, Indian entertainment personality
- Muhammad ibn Muqatil al-'Akki, Abbasid governor

== Given name ==
- Akki Chennabasappa, Indian actor
- Akki Sharma (born 1991) Nepalese visual effects artist and film editor

== Nickname ==
- Akshay Kumar (born 1967), Indian actor nicknamed Akki
- Akshaya Chopra (born 1990), Indian comedian nicknamed Akki

== Historical character ==
- Akki, a royal gardener in the Sumerian town of Kish, foster-father of Sargon of Akkad

== Fictional characters ==
- Akki, a character in The Pit Dragon Trilogy series of novels by Jane Yolen
- Akki, a character in the novel The Kaiser's Last Kiss by Alan Judd

== See also ==
- Akki (disambiguation)
- Aki (name)
