= Thunderbolt =

Symbolic representation of lightning

The high-voltage electricity warning symbol is a contemporary example of thunderbolt iconography.

A thunderbolt, or lightning bolt, is a symbolic representation of lightning. It appears variously in history, literature, and in contemporary warnings of (typically high-voltage) electricity. Thunderbolts may appear naturally among the estimated 8.6 million lightning strikes per day or not: heat lightning is an electrical discharge in the atmosphere without an accompanying sound, and a Tesla coil produces an artificial "lightning"-like electrical discharge with an accompanying clap. The term "thunderbolt" adds the notion of a loud thunderclap accompanying a lightning flash, while the term "lightning bolt" — which refers directly to the electrical discharge — does not.

In Indo-European mythology, the thunderbolt was identified with the 'Sky Father'; this association is also found in later Hellenic representations of Zeus and Vedic descriptions of the vajra wielded by the god Indra. It may have been a symbol of cosmic order, as expressed in the fragment from Heraclitus describing "the Thunderbolt that steers the course of all things".

In its original usage the word may also have been a description of the consequences of a close approach between two planetary cosmic bodies, as Plato suggested in Timaeus, or, according to Victor Clube, meteors, though this is not currently the case. As a divine manifestation the thunderbolt has been a powerful symbol throughout history, and has appeared in many mythologies. Drawing from this powerful association, the thunderbolt is often found in military symbolism and semiotic representations of electricity.

== In history, religion and mythology ==
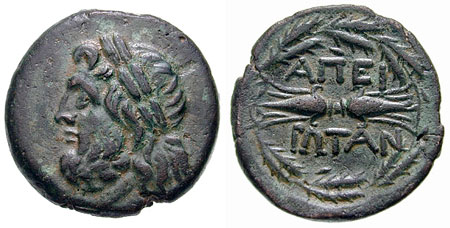
Zeus' head and thunderbolt on a coin from Epirus, 234 BC.

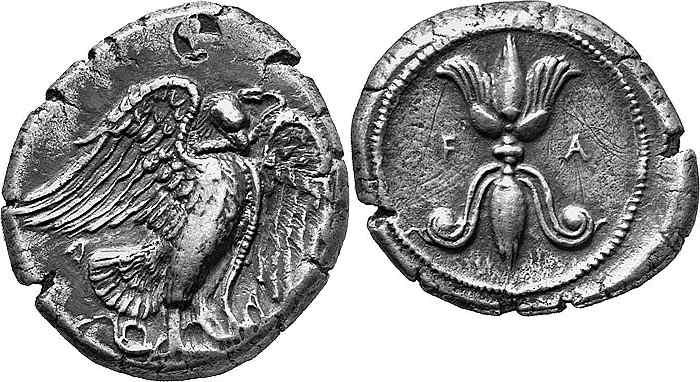
The thunderbolt pattern with an eagle on a coin from Olympia, Greece, 432-c.421 BC.

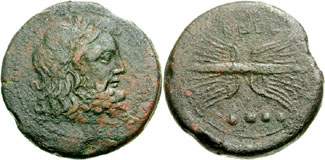
Zeus' head and thunderbolt on a coin from Capua, Campania, 216-211 BC.

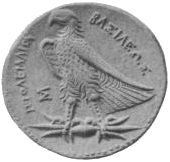
Ptolemaic coin showing the Eagle of Zeus, holding a thunderbolt

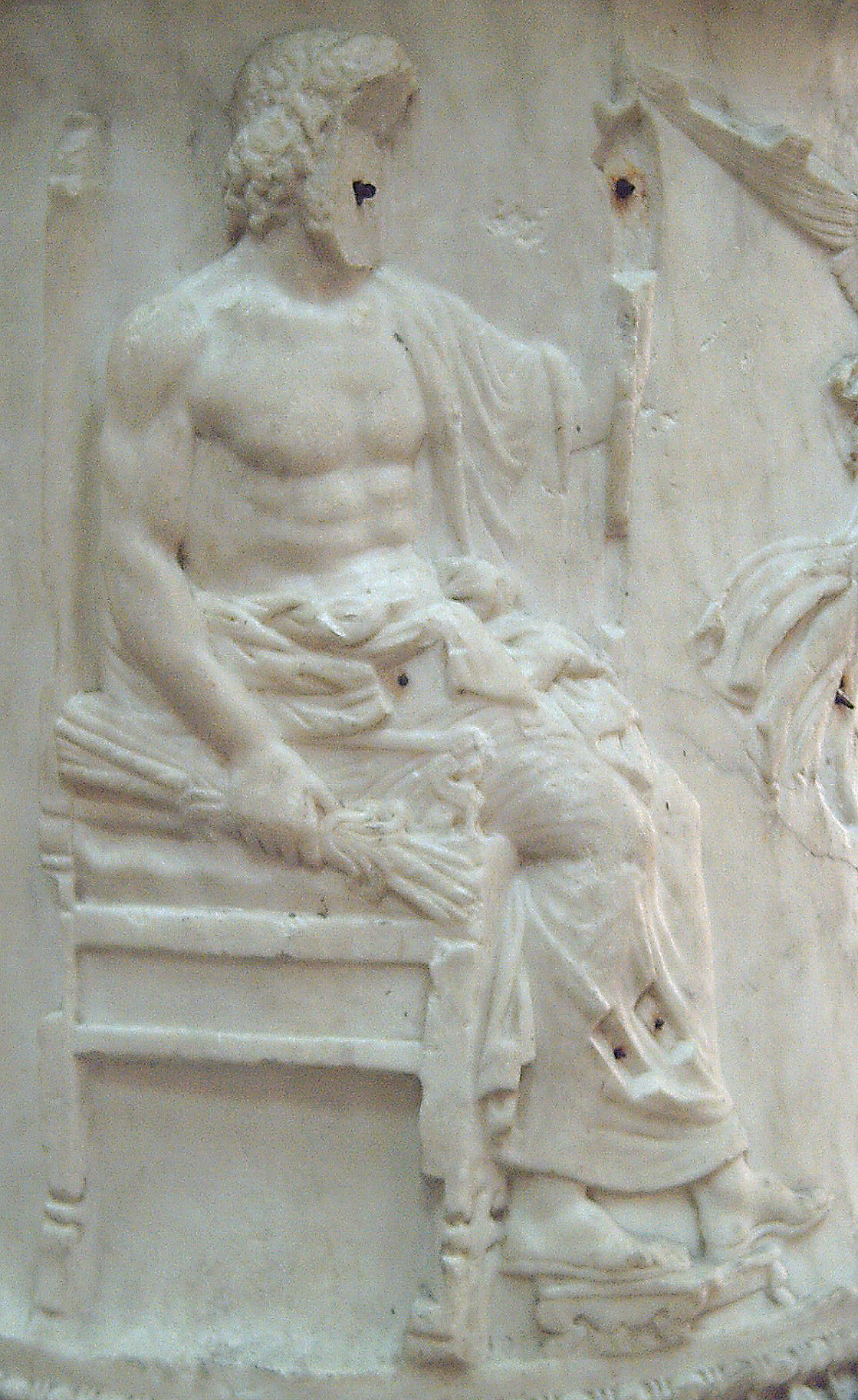
Neo-Attic bas-relief sculpture of Jupiter, holding a thunderbolt in his right hand; detail from the Moncloa Puteal (Roman, 2nd century), National Archaeological Museum, Madrid

Depictions of lightning have appeared throughout history, and religions and mythologies. Often it is the weapon of a sky god and weather god. As such, it is an unsurpassed method of dramatic instantaneous retributive destruction: thunderbolts as divine weapons can be found in many mythologies.

- in the Torah, the word for 'arrow', khets חֵץ, is used for the "arrows" of YHWH/Elohim, which are represented as lightnings in Habakuk 3:11, but also as general calamities inflicted on men as divine punishment in Deuteronomy 32:42, Psalm 64:7, Job 6:4, etc.
- In Christianity, One of its most significant verses is Deuteronomy 6:4, Verses 6:4–5 were also quoted by Jesus in Mark 12:28–34 as the Great Commandment. The Second Coming of Jesus is compared to lightning (Matthew 24: 27, Luke 17: 24). With the establishment of Christianity, it passed into popular belief that lightning is the fire that leaves behind the chariot of the Prophet Elijah as it runs through the sky, while thunder is the rattle of the feet of the horses that drag his chariot. According to another tradition, lightning and thunder are more island-like, as the cannons fired by the Archangel Michael against Satan.
- In Hittite (and Hurrian) mythology, a triple thunderbolt was one symbol of Teshub (Tarhunt).
- In Vedic religion (and later Hindu mythology) the god Indra is the god of lightning. His main weapon is the thunderbolt (Vajra).
- In Greek mythology, the thunderbolt is a weapon given to Zeus by the Cyclopes. Based on this, in Roman mythology, the thunderbolt is a weapon given to Jupiter by the Cyclopes, and is thus one of the emblems of Jupiter, often depicted on Greek and Roman coins and elsewhere as an eagle holding in its claws a thunderbolt which resembles in form a bundle of crossed sticks.
- In Celtic mythology, Taranis is the god of thunder, in Irish, Tuireann.
- In Norse mythology, Thor is specifically the god of thunder and lightning, wielding Mjölnir.
- In Slavic mythology, Perun is the god of the sky, controlling storms, thunder and lightning and wields the Axe of Perun.
- In Finnish mythology, Ukko is the god of thunder and lightning, wielding Ukonvasara.
- In Turkish mythology, Bayülgen creates the thunderbolts.
- In Maya mythology, Huracan is sometimes represented as three thunderbolts.
- In Guaraní mythology, Tupã is the embodiment of thunder and has power over lightning.
- In Cherokee mythology, the Ani Hyuntikwalaski ("thunder beings") cause lightning fire in a hollow sycamore tree.
- In Ojibway mythology, thunder is created by the Thunderbirds (Nimkiig or Binesiiwag), which can be both benevolent and malevolent to human beings.
- In Igbo mythology, the thunderbolt is the weapon of Amadioha/Amadiora.
- In Yoruba mythology, the thunderbolt is the weapon of Shango.
- In Tibetan Buddhism, the Vajra or thunderbolt is symbol of Vajrayana branch.
- In Paleo-Balkan mythology, Zibelthiurdos (also "Zbelsurdos", "Zibelthurdos"): a god recognized as similar to the Greek Zeus as a wielder of lightning and thunderbolts.
- In Navajo mythology, the hero twins, Naʼídígishí and Naayééʼ Neizghání, have bows that shoot thunderbolts as arrows.
- In Chinese mythology, Lei Gong uses thunderbolts as a weapon and his wife, Dian Mu, creates the accompanying lightning flashes with her mirror.

=== Thunderstones ===
The name "thunderbolt" or "thunderstone" has also been traditionally applied to the fossilised rostra of belemnoids. The origin of these bullet-shaped stones was not understood, and thus a mythological explanation of stones created where a lightning struck has arisen.

== In the modern world ==
The thunderbolt or lightning bolt continues into the modern world as a prominent symbol, and term; it has entered modern heraldry and military iconography.

=== In iconography ===
- The thunderbolt is used as an electrical symbol.
- The thunderbolt is also used as a hazard symbol indicating dangers from electricity.
- The thunderbolt is the logo of the Los Angeles Chargers of the NFL (originally the San Diego Chargers of the AFL)
- A thunderbolt is used in the logo of the Australian hard rock band AC/DC.
- A thunderbolt is used in the logo of the German car manufacturer Opel.
- The logo of the People's Action Party in Singapore.
- The thunderbolt used by squatters as their insignia.
- Numerous fascist organizations such as the Schutzstaffel, the British Union of Fascists, and the Union of Bulgarian National Legions (SBNL) historically used thunderbolts as their symbols.

=== In fiction ===
- In the DC Universe, the thunderbolt is used as an emblem or motif on the costumes worn by Captain Marvel, the Flash, Garth Ranzz, Ayla Ranzz, Black Lightning, Static, and Livewire.
- In the Marvel Universe the thunderbolt is used as an emblem or motif on the costumes worn by Electro, Quicksilver, Black Bolt, Speed Demon, and Ms. Marvel. It is also the name of a superhero team.
- The thunderbolt is used in the logo of the Power Rangers franchise.
- In the Harry Potter novel and film series, both the scar on Harry Potter's forehead and the stylised "P" in the logo are shaped like thunderbolts.
- In the novel The Godfather, "being hit with the thunderbolt" is an Italian expression (colpo di fulmine) referring to a man being spellbound at the sight of a beautiful woman (like the so-called love at first sight). The novel's emerging main character is affected in this fashion and eventually marries a woman whose appearance initially affects him in this way.

=== In names ===
The term "thunderbolt" as a verbal representation of a lightning bolt accompanied by a loud thunderclap is used to convey power and speed.

- P-47 Republic Thunderbolt – the top combination of size, power, and speed in a World War II fighter aircraft.
- Thunderbolt – a British world land speed racer; powered by two Rolls-Royce R V-12 aero engines, the 4,700 bhp (3,505 kW; 4,765 PS) one-off was the fastest thing on Earth in several durations during the 1930s.

== Unicode code points ==
- U+2607 ☇ LIGHTNING

Related forms have these code points:

- U+21AF ↯ DOWNWARDS ZIGZAG ARROW
- U+2B4D ⭍ DOWNWARDS TRIANGLE-HEADED ZIGZAG ARROW
- U+26A1 ⚡ HIGH VOLTAGE SIGN
- U+1F5F2 🗲 LIGHTNING MOOD
- U+03DF ϟ GREEK SMALL LETTER KOPPA
- U+2621 ☡ CAUTION SIGN

== Gallery ==
Typical cartoon representations of thunderbolts (lightning bolts)

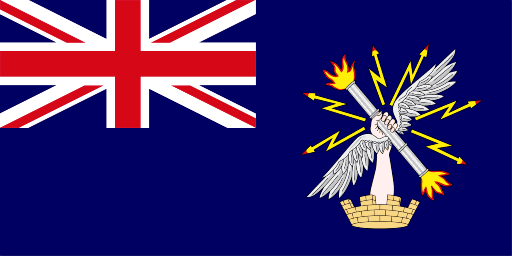
Thunderbolts represented on the Royal Engineers' ensign

Emblem of the United States Air Force

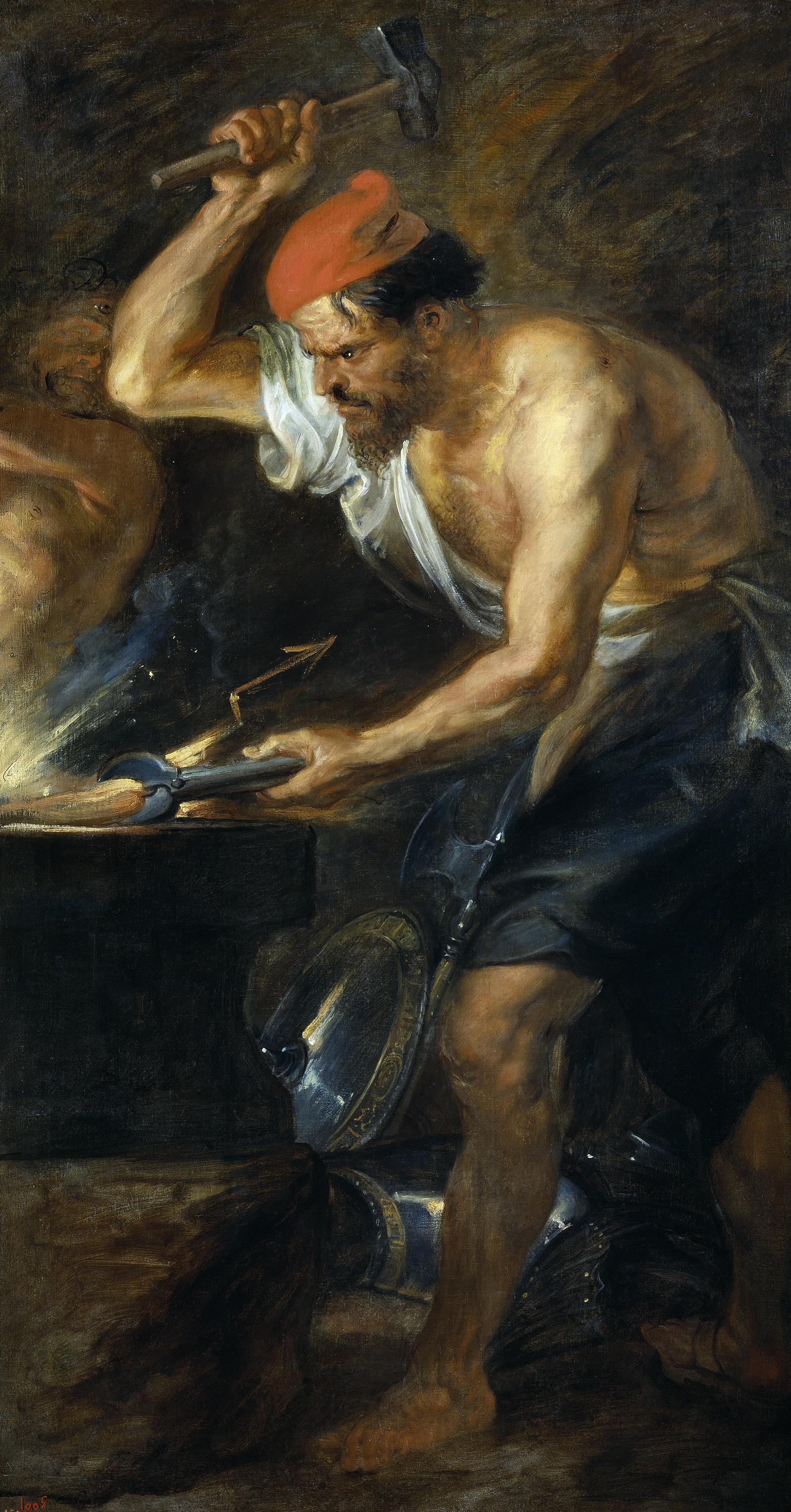
Vulcan forging the thunderbolts of Jupiter
(by Pieter Paul Rubens)

Thunderbolt through circle used as squatters' symbol

Thunderbolt through circle in the Union of Bulgarian National Legions (SBNL) emblem

Opel's logo represents thunderbolt

The shield of Strategic Air Command shows a mailed hand holding an olive branch and thunderbolts

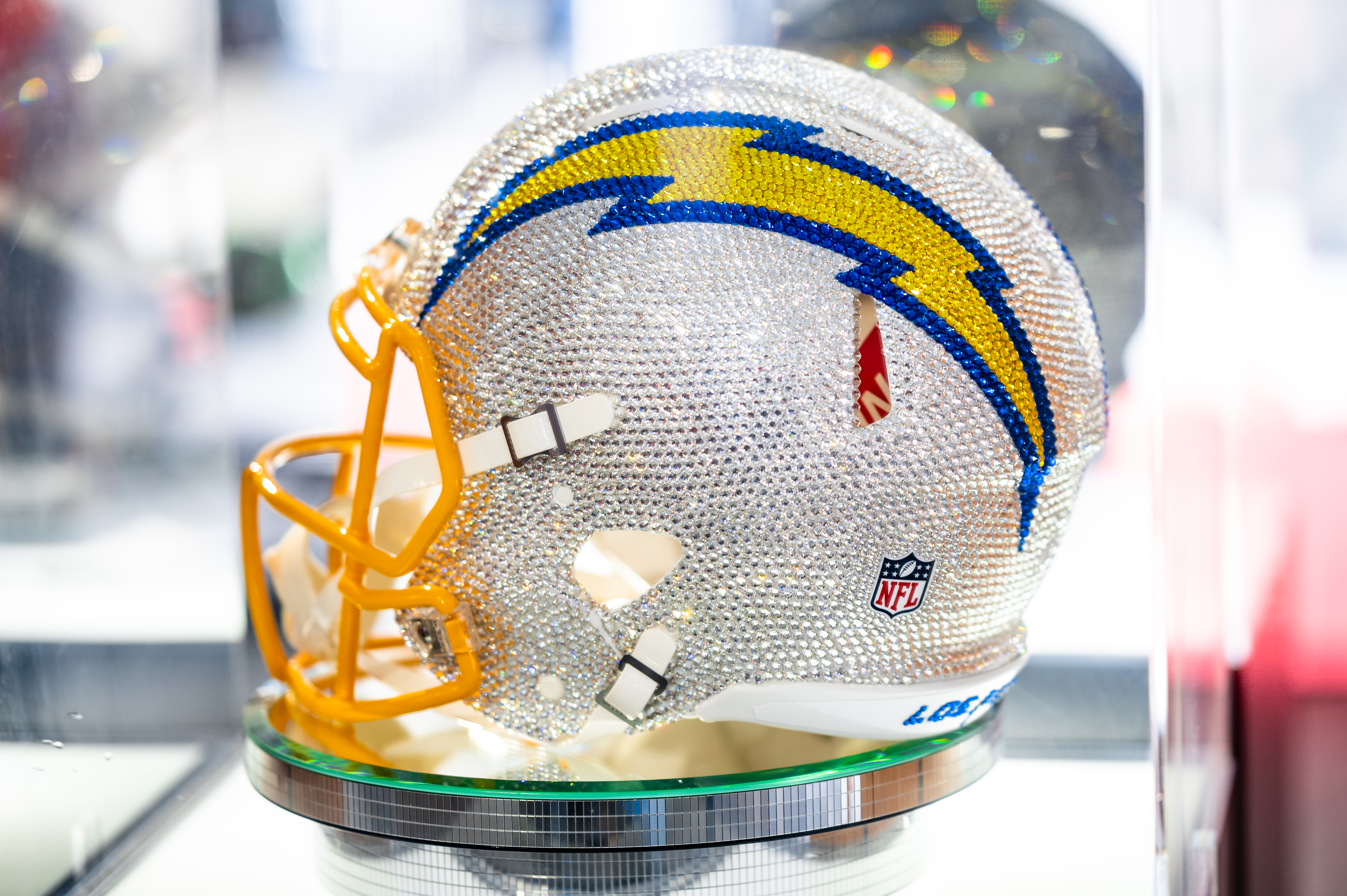
A Los Angeles Chargers helmet with thunderbolt iconography

== See also ==
- Mjölnir
- Thunderstone (folklore)
- Vajra
