= Kangasmäki =

Kangasmäki is a Finnish surname. Notable people with the surname include:

- Aki Kangasmäki (born 1989), Finnish ice hockey player
- Kai-Pekka Kangasmäki (born 1985), heavy metal musician
- Jorma Kangasmäki (born 1952), football coach and footballer
- Reino Kangasmäki (1916–2010), Finnish wrestler
