= Mielenrauhaa =

Studio album by Aki Sirkesalo
- Released: January 1995
- Genre: Funk, soul, rock, pop
- Label: Sony Music Entertainment
- Producer: Esa Kaartamo

Aki Sirkesalo chronology
| Mielenrauhaa (1995) | Aika (1996) |

Mielenrauhaa is the debut solo studio album by Finnish singer-songwriter Aki Sirkesalo. Released by Sony Music Entertainment in January 1995, the album peaked at number five on the Finnish Albums Chart and spawned some of his best-known songs, such as "Naispaholainen", "Hikinen iltapäivä" and "Pelkkää kuvitelmaa", a Finnish-language cover version of The Temptations song "Just My Imagination (Running Away with Me)". The latter was also released as a single and peaked at number nine on the Finnish Singles Chart.

== Reception ==
Sirkesalo received an Emma Award for the Best Album in 1995. According to IFPI Finland, Mielenrauhaa earned Sirkesalo a gold record in 1995 and went on to sell platinum by 1999.

== Track listing ==
Standard Edition
| No. | Title | Length |
|---|---|---|
| 1. | "Mielenrauhaa" | 4:48 |
| 2. | "Iho muistaa" | 4:34 |
| 3. | "Naispaholainen" | 3:51 |
| 4. | "Miehen täytyy" | 4:29 |
| 5. | "Marvin Gaye" | 4:06 |
| 6. | "Mustankipee" | 5:09 |
| 7. | "Vieläkö sun omenapuusi kasvaa" | 6:29 |
| 8. | "Koti-ikävä" | 2:55 |
| 9. | "Hikinen iltapäivä" | 4:10 |
| 10. | "Kun musiikki soi" | 4:22 |
| 11. | "Sä jaksat tanssii" | 3:39 |
| 12. | "Sileää pintaa" | 4:35 |

"Kultapainos" (Special Edition)
| No. | Title | Length |
|---|---|---|
| 1. | "Pelkkää kuvitelmaa (Albumiversio)" | 5:59 |
| 2. | "Mielenrauhaa" | 4:48 |
| 3. | "Iho muistaa" | 4:34 |
| 4. | "Naispaholainen" | 3:51 |
| 5. | "Miehen täytyy" | 4:29 |
| 6. | "Marvin Gaye" | 4:06 |
| 7. | "Mustankipee" | 5:09 |
| 8. | "Sä jaksat tanssii (Aamuun asti mix)" | 4:54 |
| 9. | "Vieläkö sun omenapuusi kasvaa" | 6:29 |
| 10. | "Koti-ikävä" | 2:55 |
| 11. | "Hikinen iltapäivä" | 4:10 |
| 12. | "Kun musiikki soi" | 4:22 |
| 13. | "Sä jaksat tanssii" | 3:39 |
| 14. | "Sileää pintaa" | 4:35 |
| 15. | "Vieläkö sun omenapuusi kasvaa (Toosa auki mix)" | 6:07 |
| 16. | "Hikinen iltapäivä (Radiomafia live)" | 4:25 |

== Chart performance ==
| Chart (1995) | Peak position |
|---|---|
| Finland (Suomen virallinen lista) | 5 |
