= 30 unohtumatonta laulua =

Compilation album by Aki Sirkesalo
- Released: 23 October 2006
- Genre: Funk, soul, pop
- Label: Sony Music Entertainment

Aki Sirkesalo chronology
Sanasta miestä (2005)	30 unohtumatonta laulua (2006)	The Essential Aki Sirkesalo (2011)

30 unohtumatonta laulua is a second compilation album by a Finnish singer-songwriter Aki Sirkesalo. Released posthumously by Sony Music Entertainment on 23 October 2006, the album peaked at number 31 on the Finnish Albums Chart.

== Track listing ==
No.	Title	Length
1.	"Hikinen iltapäivä"	4:10
2.	"Mustankipee"	5:08
3.	"Naispaholainen"	3:50
4.	"Pelkkää kuvitelmaa"	4:58
5.	"Mielenrauhaa"	4:48
6.	"Marvin Gaye"	4:05
7.	"Sä jaksat tanssii (Aamuun asti mix)"	4:54
8.	"Missä betoni kasvaa"	5:29
9.	"Seksuaalista häirintää"	3:52
10.	"Heitätkö avaimen"	3:25
11.	"Kiire"	4:20
12.	"Leijailen"	3:52
13.	"Kissanainen"	4:28
14.	"Pikkuihminen"	4:36
15.	"Äiti"	3:39
16.	"Punatukkainen"	4.25
17.	"Mä tuun kotiin"	4:07
18.	"Mykkäkoulu"	3:13
19.	"Helena"	3:27
20.	"Enkeleitä onko heitä"	4:36
21.	"Senat sakaisin"	4:02
22.	"Tule mun luo"	3:34
23.	"Talismaani"	4:27
24.	"Melkein onnellinen"	3:50
25.	"Toijalan takana"	3:55
26.	"Mysteriet (Mysteeri)"	3:59
27.	"Mullonikäväsua"	3:25
28.	"Turistit"	4:06
29.	"Parempaa aikaa"	3:51
30.	"Tule nyt"	4:06

== Chart performance ==
Chart (2006)	Peak position
Finland (Suomen virallinen lista)	31
