= Halutuimmat =

Compilation album by Aki Sirkesalo
- Released: 26 September 2002
- Genre: Funk, soul, pop
- Label: Sony Music Entertainment

Aki Sirkesalo chronology
Enkeleitä onko heitä (2001)	Halutuimmat (2002)	Sanasta miestä (2005)

Halutuimmat is a compilation album by Finnish singer-songwriter Aki Sirkesalo. Released by Sony Music Entertainment on 26 September 2002, the album peaked at number nine on the Finnish Albums Chart.

== Track listing ==
No.	Title	Length
1.	"Melkein onnellinen"	3:51
2.	"Naispaholainen"	3:49
3.	"Punatukkainen"	3:36
4.	"Kissanainen"	3:55
5.	"Tule mun luo"	3:34
6.	"Enkeleitä onko heitä"	4:02
7.	"Mustankipee"	5:08
8.	"Marvin Gaye"	4:05
9.	"Mykkäkoulu"	3:12
10.	"Helena"	3:26
11.	"Pelkkää kuvitelmaa"	4:58
12.	"Seksuaalista häirintää"	3:51
13.	"Hikinen iltapäivä"	4:09
14.	"Mä tuun kotiin"	4:06
15.	"Mielenrauhaa"	4:48
16.	"Mikään ei muutu"	6:01
17.	"Aika"	5:01
18.	"Toijalan takana"	3:54

== Chart performance ==
Chart (2002)	Peak position
Finland (Suomen virallinen lista)	9
