= Aika (album) =

Studio album by Aki Sirkesalo
- Released: 1996
- Genre: Funk, soul, rock, pop
- Label: Sony Music Entertainment
- Producer: Esa Kaartamo

Aki Sirkesalo chronology
Mielenrauhaa (1995)	Aika (1996)	Kissanelämää (1998)

Aika is the second solo studio album by a Finnish singer-songwriter Aki Sirkesalo. Released by Sony Music Entertainment in 1996, the album peaked at number three on the Finnish Albums Chart.

== Track listing ==
No.	Title	Length
1.	"Aika"	5:01
2.	"Kiire"	4:20
3.	"Seksuaalista häirintää"	3:53
4.	"Leijailen"	3:53
5.	"Missä betoni kasvaa"	5:30
6.	"Toulambe laulaa"	4:01
7.	"Lemmen jättiläinen"	2:43
8.	"Heitätkö avaimen"	3:35
9.	"Se oikea"	3:15
10.	"Tämä kaupunki"	4:07
11.	"Suuri sydän ja käärmeen kieli"	4:22
12.	"Mikään ei muutu"	5:03

== Chart performance ==
Chart (1996)	Peak position
Finland (Suomen virallinen lista)	3
