= Ibrahim I ibn al-Aghlab =

Emir of Ifriqiya (from 800 – 812)

- Emir of Ifriqiya (9 July 800 – 5 July 812)
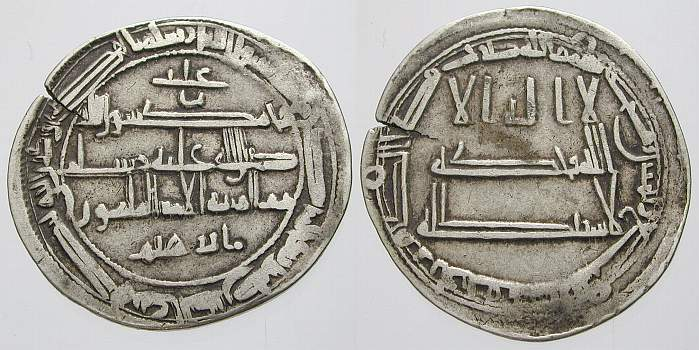
- Silver dirham of Ibrahim ibn al-Aghlab
- Predecessor: Muhammad ibn Muqatil al-Akki (as Abbasid governor)
- Successor: Abdallah
- Born: c. 756; Kairouan Abbasid Caliphate
- Died: 5 July 812; Kairouan Aghlabid State
- Children: Abdallah; Ziyadat Allah; Abu Iqal
- House: Aghlabids
- Father: al-Aghlab
- Religion: Muʿtazila Islam

Ibrahim I ibn al-Aghlab (Arabic: إبراهيم ابن الأغلب; 756–812) was the first Emir of the Ifriqiya from Aghlabid family (800–812).

== Origin and early career ==
He was the son of al-Aghlab, a Khurasani Arab who had been a companion of Abu Muslim during the Abbasid Revolution. He had served as governor of Ifriqiya in 765–767, and was killed during the revolt of al-Hasan ibn Harb.

The Encyclopaedia of Islam describes Ibrahim as "energetic and wise, prudent and shrewd, a brave fighter as well as skilful diplomat", and of considerable education, including in Islamic jurisprudence, as well as talented in poetry and oratory.

In 795, Ibrahim was appointed governor of the Zab. From that position he played a leading role in the suppression of a revolt against the Abbasid governor of Ifriqya, Muhammad ibn Muqatil al-Akki. As a reward, on 9 July 800 Caliph Harun al-Rashid recognized him as emir of Ifriqiya, and bestowed virtually complete independence in exchange for an annual payment of 40,000 gold dinars to the Abbasid treasury. This allowed Ibrahim and his successors to establish the hereditary Aghlabid dynasty.

== Reign ==
Ibrahim was successful in subduing the last Berber uprisings that had continued since the Great Berber Revolt, although the southern part of the Maghreb had to be given up for lost, and the Berbers there allowed to keep their Kharijite or Shi'a beliefs, which a century later would provide the basis for the downfall of the Aghlabids to the Shi'a Fatimids.

Domestically, Ibrahim and his successors faced constant opposition from the Arab settler community (jund) in Tunis and Kairouan, which was jealous of their prerogatives and oppressed the native population. In addition, Ibrahim was a Mu'tazili Muslim, and in opposition to the Maliki jurists of Kairouan. He named Abu Muhriz, a Mu'tazili imam, as Qadi (Shari'a magistrate) Qayrawan (cadi of Kairouan) in 806.

Ibrahim faced two revolts from the jund, one by Hamdis ibn Abd al-Rahman al-Kindi in 802, and the other by Imran ibn Mukhallad in 809. As a result, Ibrahim established the palace city of al-Abbasiyya (or al-Qasr al-Qadim), just south of Kairouan, and imported a large number of black African slave soldiers to lessen his dependence on the jund.

On his death on 5 July 812, he was succeeded by his son Abdallah I (r. 812–817).

== Sources ==
- Hitti, Philip K. A History of the Arabs, 5th ed. London, 1951.
- Marçais, G. & Schacht, J. (1960). "Ag̲h̲labids or Banu 'l-Ag̲h̲lab". In Gibb, H. A. R.; Kramers, J. H.; Lévi-Provençal, E.; Schacht, J.; Lewis, B. & Pellat, Ch. (eds.). The Encyclopaedia of Islam, Second Edition. Volume I: A–B. Leiden: E. J. Brill. pp. 247–250. doi:10.1163/1573-3912_islam_COM_0024. OCLC 495469456.

Ibrahim I ibn al-Aghlab Aghlabid dynasty
Preceded by Muhammad ibn Muqatil al-Akki as Abbasid governor	Emir of Ifriqiya; 800–812	Succeeded by Abdallah I
