= Akis =

Akis may refer to:

- A crater in the Mons Vinogradov
- Aghtsk, Armenia - formerly Akis
- Akis (given name)
- Akis (periodical), a former periodical in Turkey
- Akis (beetle), a genus of beetle in tribe Akidini

== See also ==
- Aki (disambiguation) for the singular of the plural 'Akis'
