= World Without God =

Studio album by Convulse
- Released: 13 September 1991
- Recorded: 1991
- Genre: Death metal
- Length: 37:38
- Label: Thrash Records, Eternal Darkness Productions, Relapse Records

Convulse chronology
World Without God (1991)	Reflections (1994)

World Without God is the debut album by Finnish death metal band Convulse, originally released through Thrash Records on 13 September 1991.

== Release history ==
World Without God was originally released on Thrash Records on 13 September 1991. It was re-released by Eternal Darkness Productions in a limited print, which also contains the "Resuscitation Of Evilness" demo, a rehearsal from 1990 featuring the tracks "Godless Truth" and "Powerstruggle Of Belief" as well as a live cover of Venom's "Countess Bathory" taken from the "Live In Pain" bootleg. It was re-released again, this time by Relapse Records in 2010 with Resuscitation Of Evilness demo and live songs Countess Bathory and Incantation Of Restoration as bonus tracks. It is also available in limited vinyl, with 500 of them in black and 100 clear.

== Music and lyrics ==
Denise Falzon of Exclaim! said that World Without God "presents the band's amalgamation of death metal, black metal and grindcore with such powerful force that each track contains even more of an evil atmosphere than the one before." Greg Prato of AllMusic said: "Consult your 'death metal checklist' and all the prerequisites are on display here -- guttural growls, indecipherable lyrics, nonstop riffing, brutal beats, and, of course, foul song titles." Brian Corsair of Invisible Oranges noted the album's use of hooks, stating: "The focus of World Without God was on spectacularly heavy riffs arranged in a way that cements them in a listener’s brain. Chord progressions are not put together to confuse or beguile; if a riff starts with a tremolo, it will move into a chunky power chord, and Convulse, confident that their riffs were worth hearing over and over again, used repetition heavily to drive them home."

== Reception and legacy ==
Greg Prato of AllMusic gave the album three and a half stars out of five. He said: "It may sound like your average/ordinary death metal band by and large, but you have to give these chaps credit for sticking to their guns and unleashing World Without God during a time that was a world without death metal."

World Without God is considered by some journalists to be an overlooked release in the death metal genre. In 2021, Brian Corsair of Invisible Oranges wrote: "It’s understandable why death metal albums from this same time period and region that were more exploratory in approach often get more attention, but Convulse focused on something equally laudable to invention, which was mastery. Every riff, lead, vocal line, and drum beat feel carefully and intentionally chosen for maximum impact and replayability, sticking in the brain like a murderous fog. Many bands have followed in the footsteps of Convulse for their heavy riffs and putrid sound, but the band’s true talent, songwriting, is what is underappreciated." In the 30 years since World Without God released, none of the imitators have matched it, and perhaps never will." In 2024, Graham Hartmann of Metal Injection wrote: "These Finnish blasphemers would've been huge if they'd only grown up in Florida. What a fucking guitar tone on this beast! The drums are on full-tilt as well, giving this album an attitude that few death metal bands could stack up to. Flawless execution."

== Track listing ==
No.	Title	Length
1.	"Introduction"	0:49
2.	"World Without God"	4:55
3.	"Putrid Intercourse"	3:22
4.	"Incantation Of Restoration"	3:45
5.	"Blasphemous Verses"	4:28
6.	"False Religion"	4:46
7.	"Resuscitation Of Evilness"	3:45
8.	"Infernal End"	3:34
9.	"Godless Truth"	3:00
10.	"Powerstruggle of Belief"	4:01
Total length:		37:38

== Personnel ==
- Rami Jämsä - vocals, lead guitar
- Jani Kuhanen - rhythm guitar
- Juha "Patti" Telenius - bass
- Janne Miikkulainen - drums
