= Aki Inomata =

Japanese artist (born 1983)

Aki Inomata (あき いのまた Inomata Aki, born 1983) is a Japanese multidisciplinary contemporary artist and designer based in Tokyo. Her work addresses identity and displacement, and questions societal boundaries between humans versus animals and the natural versus man-made worlds. Much of her artistic practice aims at creating collaborative interspecies relationships through such contemporary modeling technologies as 3-D scanning and printing techniques. Inomata's cross-disciplinary Bio Art projects complicate the notion of production while proposing a new awareness of human and nonhuman ecologies, as she states: "The concept of my works is to get people to perceive the modes of life of various living creatures by experience a kind of empathy toward them."

== Education and professional activity ==
Born in Tokyo in 1983, Inomata grew up in a "forest of concrete buildings", and attributes her artistic influences to early experiences in greenspaces at schools and parks as respite in her childhood urban environment. Contact with animal and insect life in these spaces sparked Inomata's early interest in interspecies kinships. Inomata graduated with an MFA in Intermedia Art from Tokyo University of the Arts in 2008, studying under artist Yoshiaki Watanabe. As a student, Inomata experimented with sound installations and digital projections in order to engage natural environments in urban space, inspired by avant-garde Japanese playwright Jūrō Kara's theatrical technique of shakkei, or "borrowed scenery". In 2013, she began working as a visiting researcher at Waseda University and in 2014 became a part-time Faculty of Art and Design lecturer at the Department of Informational Design at Tama Art University. She was awarded the Grand Prize at the 2014 YouFab Global Creative Awards from Loftwork Inc. In 2017, she lived in New York for three months as a recipient of an Individual Fellowship Grant with International Studio & Curatorial Program (ISCP) from the Asian Cultural Council. Most recently, she has worked as a part-time lecturer at the Department of Art and Design, Joshibi University of Art and Design since 2019, and the Department of Sculpture at Musashino Art University since 2020.

== Artwork ==
Inomata is best known for projects highlighting interspecies relationships and collaborations, often facilitated through complimenting natural animal processes with technological interventions. Departing from her early student work with technological simulations of natural environments, Inomata's breakthrough came through collaborations with nonhuman species as "co-creators".

For one of her best known early works, entitled Why Not Hand Over a "Shelter" to Hermit Crabs? (2009), Inomata utilized rapid prototyping and CT scanning to produce habitable 3D-printed plastic shells for hermit crabs decorated with cityscapes. The series explored themes of exchangeability, nationality, and immigration. Inomata describes the inspiration for the piece coming from her participation in the group exhibition No Man's Land at the French Embassy of Japan in 2009, in which she learned of land possession agreements between the two countries: "This work was inspired by the fact that the land of the former French Embassy in Japan had been French until October 2009, and then became Japanese for the following fifty years, after which it will be returned to France. I was surprised to hear this story, and associated this image with the way that hermit crabs exchange shelters." For her participation in No Man's Land, Inomata exhibited photographs of hermit crabs in her the clear resin sculptures of Tokyo housing complexes and Paris' Haussmann apartment buildings. Later iterations would include cityscapes and cosmopolitan landmarks such as Berlin's Reichstag and Beijing's Temple of Heaven. The use of hermit crabs plays off the Japanese term for the animal yadokari, which means a tenant or someone renting a home. The hermit crabs' acceptance, inhabitation, and exchanges of the printed shells represents the swapping and crossing of cities and nationalities, especially for global migrants and refugees. Inomata created a follow-up work to the series Why Not Hand Over a "Shelter" to Hermit Crabs? under the subtitle White Chapel (2014–2015), with the printed structure of a wedding chapel from Japan. The work refers to the pop-up nature in Japanese cities of Christian chapels, stemming from the huge popularity of Western-style weddings in Japan despite only one percent of Japanese citizens identifying as Christian. The work identifies the remnants of postcolonialism in Japan through its eager adaptations of Western architectures, religious ceremonies, and cultural practices. Resisting essentialist readings of identity, Inomata states of the work: "For hermit crabs, the shell is not a part of their own body. However, when we see hermit crabs, we identify them with their shells."

For Inomata's 2012 work Girl, girl, girl..., the artist spent two years raising bagworms, a species of moths which construct protective cases that male bagworms leave upon adulthood while females remain until they find male mates. Inomata's intervention involved cutting pieces of fabric from women's clothing and giving the strips to the bagworms to use in their casing. Giving pieces of colored paper to bagworms to construct colorful casings has also been a traditional game for Japanese children. Girl, girl, girl... was an installation of these bagworm casings, weaved by the bagworms with fashion fabric, and created to premier in women's department stores, as a commentary on gender discrepancies in pursuits of personal upkeep, fashion, and the development of a culture of hyper-consumerism.

Other major artworks include the performance piece I Wear the Dog's Hair, and the Dog Wears My Hair, in which Inomata collected the hair of her dog Cielo over the course of several years, as well as her own hair, and created capes out of each other's respective hair. In an act of "exchanging coats", Inomata highlights the co-development of human beings and their domesticated pets, having evolved alongside each other for centuries. At the same time, the work exposes uneven value assessments of animal life, the contradictions implicit in animal domestication, and complicates the idea of pet ownership. Human interventions in the breeding of domesticated animals, for instance, warps animal genetics to meet the needs of their owners: an exploitation of ecology that Inomata warns against.

Ecological loss also factors significantly into Inomata's most recent work. In the wake of the 2011 Fukushima Daiichi nuclear disaster, caused by the Tōhoku earthquake and tsunami, Inomata collaborated with Toho University marine scientists Kenji Okoshi and Masahiro Suzuki for the work Lines—Listening to the Growth Lines of Molluscan Shell (2015—). The project examines the growth lines and patterns of Fukushima's Asari clams. Considering the ways in which nonhuman, coastal creatures register ecological tragedy and upset, the artist transposed the clam growth lines onto disc records that could be played, thus the mollusks could be "heard". However, drawing attention to the problematics of anthropomorphizing nonhuman communications, Inomata notes gaps in the project: "The sound of this recording is not the clam's voice itself. However, perhaps within the sound, we may feel a fragment of the world the clams felt." In 2020, Inomata was included at the New York Museum of Modern Art exhibition Broken Nature, with her moving-image work Think Evolution #1: Kiku-ishi (Ammonite) (2016–17) in which the artist fabricated a resin ammonite shell, a now-extinct cephalopod, from its fossils. Inomata then introduced a live octopus to the fabricated shell, which it promptly inhabited, allowing for the impossible meeting of both animal relatives across time. The octopus is considered to be the shell-less modern evolution of the ammonite, known to use coconut shells and bivalves to protect its soft body. These projects draw on notions of deep-time, mobility, temporality, and change.

== Later work ==
Inomata has exhibited widely in Japan and around the world. In late 2019, she presented her first solo exhibition, AKI INOMATA: Significant Otherness, in Japan at the Towada Art Center in Aomori Prefecture. The title of the exhibition was derived from science historian Donna Haraway's publication, The Companion Species Manifesto: Dogs, People, and Significant Otherness in which Haraway proposes the reinvention of human relationships with other living species on earth. Working recently with oyster farms, in April 2021 Inomata staged a solo exhibition with Maho Kubota Gallery entitled Memory of Currency (2018—), featuring works inspired by pre-modern uses of seashells as currency. Using pearl cultivation methods, Inomata sculpted miniature models of several historic figures symbolic to national currencies, such as George Washington and Queen Elizabeth, and inserted them into live oysters from which "money fossils" made of nacre featuring the historic figures were produced. Inventing a new currency, Inomata's intervention into the natural processes of oyster's pearl production and recording in multichannel video probes human ascriptions of value to both natural resources and currencies, as well as humanity's dependence on the natural world.

As one of three finalists for the 2020–21 Contemporary Art Foundation Artist Award, Inomata opened a solo exhibition in which she exhibited her new work How to Carve a Sculpture at the Contemporary Art Foundation in Roppongi, Tokyo. For the work, Inomata employed beavers at Japanese zoos to gnaw on several logs, producing animal-made sculptural forms. In an earlier iteration of the series for the 2018 Thailand Biennale, Thai stone-cutters were then commissioned to replicate the wooden forms created by the beavers, which were then installed around a pond to evoke the beavers' habitat. In the series' latest iteration, Inomata employed automated CNC-machines, which produce rotary-blade nicks similar to the bite marks of the beavers, to carve the logs. The series in its multiple iterations complicates notions of artistic authorship, the human, animal and technological hand.

== Solo exhibitions ==
- 2021 – "How to Curve a Sculpture" – Contemporary Art Foundation, Tokyo
- 2021 – "Memory of Currency" – Maho Kubota Gallery, Tokyo
- 2020 – "Why Not Hand Over a 'Shelter' to Hermit Crabs?" – SEIBU SHIBUYA, Tokyo
- 2019 – "guest room 004 AKI INOMATA Poetics of Analogy: The Process of Collaboration with Different Species" – Kitakyusyu Municipal Museum of Art, Fukuoka, Japan
- 2019 – "AKI INOMATA: Significant Otherness" – Towada Art Center, Aomori, Japan
- 2018 – "Aki Inomata, Why Not Hand Over a "Shelter" to Hermit Crabs ?" – Musée d'arts de Nantes (Cette exposition est coproduite par Stereolux/Scopiton), Nantes, France
- 2015 – "Solaé art project vol.11" – Tokyo electron, Akasaka, Tokyo
- 2015 – "Spectrum File – 07 AKI INOMATA" – SPIRAL, Tokyo
- 2015 – "Emergencies! 025 AKI INOMATA Inter-Nature Communication" – NTT InterCommunication [ICC], Tokyo
- 2014 – "HAMBURG ILLUSTRATED ENCYCLOPEDIA" – Frise, Hamburg
- 2014 – "I Wear the Dog's Hair, and the Dog Wears My Hair" – Hagiso, Tokyo
- 2013 – "WORKS 2009–2013" – One, Shanghai, China
- 2012 – "girl, girl, girl..." – Seiba Shibuya, Tokyo
- 2012 – "girl, girl, girl..." – Striped House Gallery, Tokyo
- 2011 – "Aki Inomata: Why Not Hand Over a 'Shelter' to Hermit Crabs?" – The University of Vermont Fleming Museum, Vermont, USA
- 2008 – "Aki Inomata" – Gallery Teo, Tokyo

== Selected Group exhibitions ==
2004

- "Tokyo Competition 2004" – Marunouchi Building, Tokyo
- "Mobile Art" – Kyoto Seika University, Kyoto

2005

- "P&E" – ARTCOURT Gallery, Osaka

2007

- "Kiryu Saien 13" – Maehara Garage, Gunma

2008

- "Graduation Exhibition (M.F.A.) Inter Media Art Course – Tokyo University of the Arts – ZAIM, Yokohama

2009

- "No Man's Land" – Former French Embassy, Tokyo

2011

- "Nakanojyo Biennale 2011" – Former Public School 3, Gunma, Japan

2012

- "The New Phase of Image XII Out of Place" – Gallery SUZUKI, Antenna Media, Kyoto, Japan
- "The 15th Exhibition of the Taro Okamoto Award for Contemporary Art" – Taro Okamoto Museum of Art, Kawasaki, Kanagawa, Japan

2013

- "3D PRINT SHOW" – Metropolitan Pavilion, NY

2014

- "Ogaki Biennale 2013" – IAMAS, Gifu, Japan
- "3D PRINT SHOW" – Metropolitan Pavilion, NY
- "Ars Electoronica Festival 2014" – Akademisches Gymnasium, Linz, Austria
- "YouFab Global Creative Awards 2014" – FabCafe Tokyo
- "Materializing II – Between Information and Materiality" – The University Art Museum – Tokyo University of the Arts, Japan

2015

- "Show-zui-zu" – Nihonbashi Takashimaya 6F / X Art Gallery, Tokyo
- "the art fair +plus-ultra 2015" – Spiral, Tokyo
- "TOKYO DESIGN WEEK 2015 Super Interactive & Robot Museum" – Meiji-Jingu Gaien Mae, Tokyo
- "Beyond Sugar and Spice – Girls Who Overcome" Galerie Paris, Yokohama, Japan
- "Odaiba YUME-TAIRIKU" – Fuji TV Headquarters / Odaiba & Aomi Area, Tokyo
- "Généalogie des objets 2.0" – Espace Jean Legendre, Compiègne, France
- "3331 Art Fair 2015 – Various Collectors' Prizes—" – 3331 Arts Chiyoda 1F Main Gallery, Tokyo
- "Digital Choc 2015" – institut francais tokyo
- "Five Sculptors" – hpgrp gallery tokyo

2016

- "KENPOKU ART 2016" – 6 cities in the northern Ibaraki Prefecture, Japan
- "Out of Hand: Materialising the Digital" – Museum of Applied Arts & Sciences, Sydney, Australia
- "AKI INOMATA, Kentaro Kobuke, Brian Alfred TOKYO-LONDON-NEWYORK" – Maho Kubota Gallery, Tokyo
- "PERFORMATIVE PHASE" – gallery blanka, Nagoya, Japan
- "ECO EXPANDED CITY 2016" WRO Art Center, Wroclaw, Poland
- "Beyond Sugar and Spice Vol.2" – CAS, Osaka, Japan
- "New Elements" – The New State Tretyakov Gallery, Moscow, Russia

2017 – "Shutoko Expressway Fine Art Collection" – O Art Museum, Tokyo

- "Coming of Age" – Sector 2337, Chicago, USA
- "Hermit Crabs and Shelters" – Shirahama Aquarium, Kyoto University, Wakayama, Japan
- "PLAY! WATER(S)" – Ogaki City Cultural Foundation, Ogaki, Japan
- "Fictitious Realities" Bayside Arts and Cultural Centre, Melbourne, Australia
- "NARS Spring Open Studios" – Nars Foundation, New York City
- "SPRING OPEN STUDIOS 2017" – iscp(international studio & curatorial program), New York City
- "Open Rehearsal" – ALWAN FOR THE ARTS, New York City
- "The Great Ordinary" – Borderless Art Museum NO-MA, Shiga, Japan
- "Media Ambition Tokyo 2017" – Roppongi Hills, Mori Tower 52F TOKYO CITY VIEW, Tokyo
- "Moths, crabs and vibrations" – Griffin Art Space, Warszawa, Poland

2018

- "Thailand Biennale Krabi 2018" – Krabi, Thailand
- "Frankenstein in 2018: Bio-art throws light on art, science, and society today" – EYE OF GYRE, Tokyo
- "Asian Art Award 2018 supported by Warehouse TERRADA – Finalist Exhibition" – TERRADA ART COMPLEX, Tokyo
- "Pilot Plant Anniversary" – Contemporary Art and Spirits(CAS), Osaka, Japan

2019

- Toronto Biennial of Art" – Canada
- "ELLE LOVES ART" – Kashiyama Daikanyama, Tokyo
- "Made in Tokyo: Architecture and Living 1964/2020" – Japan Society, New York City
- "ALLIGA" SFER IK – Tolum, Mexico
- "Festival ]interstice[ 14" – Abbaye-Aux-Dames, Caen, France
- "STRP Festival" – Eindhoven, Netherlands
- "The XXII Triennale di Milano, Broken Nature: Design Takes on Human Survival" – La Triennale di Milano, Italy
- "Femufacture" – Japan Foundation Gallery, Sydney, Australia
- "Video art Made in Japan" – Umakart, Brno, Czech

2020

- "Broken Nature" – MoMA, New York City
- "Intermedia Art 2020 Apparition" – The University Art Museum: Tokyo University of the Arts, Tokyo
- "Space Art Tanegashima 2020" Hirota Site Museum, Tanegashima, Kagoshima, Japan
- "VIDEOTOPIA" – Maho Kubota Gallery, Tokyo
- "TOKYO 2X2X" – Maho Kubota Gallery, Tokyo
- "School of the Future Dappi/Out of Box" – Tokyo Midtown

2021

- The World Began Without Human Race, and It Will End Without It" – National Taiwan Museum of Fine Arts, Taichung City, Taiwan
- "Matsudo International Science Art Festival" – Tojo-tei, Chiba, Japan
- "SEIAN ARTS ATTENTION 14 Re:Home" – Seian University of Art and Design, Shiga, Japan
- "So Close / So Far" – Hycp Veddel-Space, Taipei City, Humburg, Germany
- "Broken Landscapes: Have Our Cities Failed?" – Jut Art Museum, Taipei City, Taiwan
