= Kissanelämää =

Studio album by Aki Sirkesalo
- Released: 1998
- Genre: Funk, soul, pop
- Label: Sony Music Entertainment
- Producer: Pekka Witikka

Aki Sirkesalo chronology
Aika (1996)	Kissanelämää (1998)	Enkeleitä onko heitä (2001)

Kissanelämää is the third solo studio album by a Finnish singer-songwriter Aki Sirkesalo. Released by Sony Music Entertainment in 1998, the album peaked at number five on the Finnish Albums Chart.

== Track listing ==
No.	Title	Length
1.	"Sanat"	4:55
2.	"Mä tuun kotiin"	4:08
3.	"Punatukkainen"	4:24
4.	"Kissanainen"	4:28
5.	"Minerva"	2:52
6.	"Äiti"	3:37
7.	"Halu hyvään"	4:23
8.	"Kun nainen haluaa"	3:46
9.	"Mykkäkoulu"	3:12
10.	"Eksyin suudelmaan"	3:57
11.	"Pikkuihminen"	4:36

== Chart performance ==
Chart (1998)	Peak position
Finland (Suomen virallinen lista)	5
