= Sanasta miestä =

Studio album by Aki Sirkesalo
- Released: 30 November 2005
- Genre: Funk, soul, pop
- Label: Sony Music Entertainment

Aki Sirkesalo chronology
Halutuimmat (2002)	Sanasta miestä (2005)	30 unohtumatonta laulua (2006)

Sanasta miestä is the fifth and final studio album by a Finnish singer-songwriter Aki Sirkesalo. Released posthumously by Sony Music Entertainment on 30 November 2005, the album peaked at number one on the Finnish Albums Chart.

== Track listing ==
No.	Title	Length
1.	"Parempaa aikaa"	3:54
2.	"Mullonikäväsua"	3:26
3.	"Turistit"	4:09
4.	"Hiljennä, Siiri"	3:56
5.	"Telepatiaa"	3:21
6.	"Kun rakkaus sanoo stop"	3:41
7.	"Haava"	3:32
8.	"Remontti"	3:56
9.	"Sanansa mittainen mies"	3:43
10.	"Mene pois"	4:20
11.	"Tule nyt"	4:09

== Chart performance ==
Chart (2005)	Peak position
Finland (Suomen virallinen lista)	1
