= Enkeleitä onko heitä =

Studio album by Aki Sirkesalo
- Released: 2001
- Genre: Funk, soul, pop
- Label: Sony Music Entertainment

Aki Sirkesalo chronology
Kissanelämää (1998)	Enkeleitä onko heitä (2001)	Halutuimmat (2002)

Enkeleitä onko heitä is the fourth solo studio album by a Finnish singer-songwriter Aki Sirkesalo. Released by Sony Music Entertainment in 2001, the album peaked at number five on the Finnish Albums Chart.

== Track listing ==
No.	Title	Length
1.	"Senat sakaisin"	4:03
2.	"Enkeleitä onko heitä"	4:37
3.	"Helena"	3:27
4.	"Tule mun luo"	3:34
5.	"Hehkuvaa laavaa"	3:36
6.	"Kitara"	4:02
7.	"Jouten"	3:31
8.	"Sikamakee"	3:15
9.	"Talismaani"	4:27
10.	"Laihat lauseet"	4:15
11.	"Suu selittää"	3:49
12.	"Enkeleitä..."	4:13

== Chart performance ==
Chart (2001)	Peak position
Finland (Suomen virallinen lista)	5
