= Akis (given name) =

Akis is a Greek masculine given name. It may refer to the following:

- Akis Agiomamitis, Greek Cypriot footballer and football manager
- Akis Cleanthous (1964–2011), Greek Cypriot politician and financial analyst
- Akis Kallinikidis (born 1977), Greek basketball player
- Akis Katsoupakis (born 1972), Greek pop musician
- Akis Mantzios (born 1969), Greek footballer and manager
- Akis Petretzikis (born 1984), Greek celebrity chef
- Akis Tsochatzopoulos (1939–2021), Greek politician, engineer, and economist
- Akis Zikos (born 1974), Greek footballer

== See also ==
- Akis (disambiguation)
