= Muhammad ibn Muqatil al-Akki =

Provincial governor of Ifriqiya

Muhammad ibn Muqatil al-Akki محمد بن مقاتل العكي

Abbasid Governor of Ifriqiya
- In office 797–799 (first period)
- Monarch: Harun al-Rashid
- Preceded by: Harthama ibn A'yan
- Succeeded by: Tammam ibn Tamim al-Tamimi

Abbasid Governor of Ifriqiya
- In office 797 - 800 (second period)
- Monarch: Harun al-Rashid
- Preceded by: Tammam ibn Tamim al-Tamimi
- Succeeded by: Ibrahim ibn al-Aghlab

Personal details
- Born: Abbasid Empire
- Died: Abbasid Empire
- Parent: Muqatil ibn Hakim al-Akki

Muhammad ibn Muqatil ibn Hakim al-Akki (Arabic: محمد بن مقاتل بن حكيم العكي) was a provincial governor for the Abbasid Caliphate. Appointed to Ifriqiya in 797, he was the last Provincial governor of that province prior to the establishment of the Aghlabid Governor dynasty in 800.

== Career ==
The son of Muqatil ibn Hakim al-Akki, a supporter of the Abbasid Revolution, Muhammad himself was a foster brother of the caliph Harun al-Rashid (r. 786–809). In 797, Harun appointed him to Ifriqiya, as a replacement for Harthamah ibn A'yan. Arriving at the provincial capital al-Qayrawan in late October or early November, his administration quickly ran into problems due to his bad conduct, and his relations with the jund (local army) soon became strained. Eventually a rebellion led by Makhlad ibn Murrah al-Azdi and supported by members of the jund and the local Berbers broke out. Muhammad dispatched an army which defeated the rebels and killed Makhlad.

In October 799, a new revolt led by Tammam ibn Tamim al-Tamimi was launched in Tunis and quickly gathered a large degree of support. Muhammad engaged the rebels as they marched toward al-Qayrawan, but was defeated and forced to retreat into the city. Tammam continued his advance and entered al-Qayrawan. Muhammad was given a guarantee of safety by the rebels on the condition that he departed from Ifriqiya. Accepting the arrangement, he departed and made his way to Tripoli.

Shortly after his exile, Muhammad received a letter from Ibrahim ibn al-Aghlab, the governor of the Zab, informing him that he had expelled Tammam from al-Qayrawan and inviting him to return to the province; Muhammad consequently was able to resume his governorship. A fresh attempt was soon made by Tammam, who had fled to Tunis, to overthrow Muhammad, but Ibrahim defeated him again and gained his submission.

Muhammad's restored rule over Ifriqiya did not last for long. His continuing unpopularity among his subjects led to Ibrahim writing to Harun al-Rashid, telling him of the hatred for Muhammad and asking to be appointed over Ifriqiya in exchange for certain financial guarantees. Harun granted this request; Muhammad was dismissed and Ibrahim became the first governor of the Aghlabid dynasty.

== See also ==
- Umar ibn Hafs Hazarmard
- Yazid ibn Hatim al-Muhallabi
- Isa ibn Musa

== Notes ==
Preceded by Harthamah ibn A'yan	Governor of Ifriqiya; 797–799	Succeeded by Tammam ibn Tamim al-Tamimi (rebel)
Preceded by Tammam ibn Tamim al-Tamimi (rebel)	Governor of Ifriqiya; 800	Succeeded by Ibrahim ibn al-Aghlab
