= Amorōnagu =

Celestial maiden in Japanese mythology

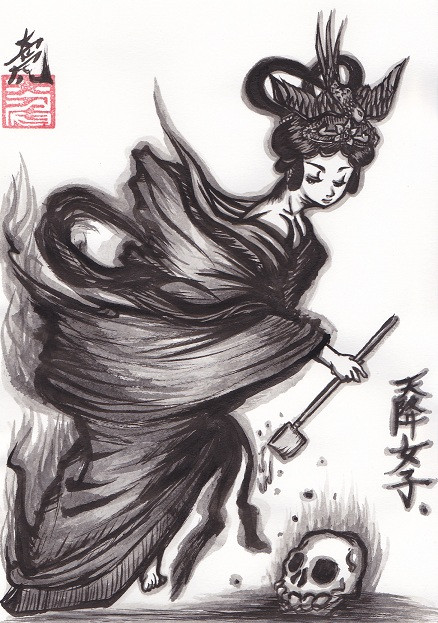
- A 19th-century depiction of Amorōnagu

Creature information
- Grouping: Tennyo
- Family: Unnamed mother Unnamed father Unnamed husband Three unnamed children

Origin
- Country: Japan
- Region: Kagoshima Prefecture

Amorōnagu (天降女子, "girl who fell from heaven"), is a tennyo (celestial maiden) from the folklore of the island of Amami Ōshima, in Kagoshima Prefecture. She is known for bathing in springs and rivers. Amorōnagu also has stories of her descending to earth, marrying a human man, and then returning to heaven.

== Mythology ==
Amorōnagu descends to Earth to find human men. When she finds one, she seduces him and offers him water from a ladle she is carrying. If the man drinks the water, he dies and she takes his soul back to heaven with her. It is possible for the man to survive if he holds the ladle in a certain way, supporting the handle with the palm facing up.

In a less morbid story, Amorōnagu descended to Earth one day so she could bathe in a river. A man saw her bathing and stole her gown from where it was hung on a tree, telling her he would only give it back if she married him. Since she needed her gown in order to return to heaven, she agreed. She would have three children with him over the next seven years. One day, Amorōnagu heard her eldest child singing a song to the youngest about where their father had hidden her gown, saying that it was in the family storehouse. She retrieved her gown and ascended back to heaven, leaving a note for her husband saying that he could join her. When Amorōnagu's husband came to live with her and her parents in heaven, her parents didn't like him and forced him to do many difficult tasks. She would always help him, but one day he didn't follow her advice to cut a winter melon horizontally, cutting it vertically instead. A flood spewed forth from the cut he made, sweeping him away and forming the Milky Way. From that point, Amorōnagu and her husband could only meet once a year on June 7th.
