= Arikura-no-baba =

Character from Japanese folklore

Arikura-no-baba (蟻鞍の婆, ant-saddle hag) is a character from the folklore of Gifu Prefecture, Japan. She was an old woman with supernatural powers who lived in Takayama. She used a prayer to stop the eruption of a mountain after it had been rumbling for seven days, and turned the hot water of an onsen cold by throwing a horse's hoof into it.
