= Ashi-magari =

Ashi-magari (足まがり, leg turner) is a ghostly phenomenon from the folklore of Kagawa Prefecture in Shikoku, Japan. It is a soft thing, like a kitten or a wad of cotton, which is felt wrapping itself around a person's legs at night, impeding their ability to walk. While it is not generally visible, it is often believed to be the trick of a tanuki.
