= Yoshiaki Watanabe =

Japanese artist

Yoshiaki Watanabe (渡辺好明, Watanabe Yoshiaki) (June 24, 1955 - November 4, 2009) was a Japanese artist, born in Hyōgo Prefecture, Japan and best known for his installation work involving candles.

He graduated from the undergraduate program at the Tokyo National University of Fine Arts and Music (now known as Tokyo University of the Arts) in 1980 with a degree in oil painting, and completed a graduate program in mural work in 1982. From 1985 to 1989 he lived and worked in Germany at the Kunstakademie Düsseldorf on a Deutscher Akademischer Austauschdienst Dienst (German Academic Exchange Service) grant.

He returned to Japan in 1989 and began working at the Tokyo National University of Fine Arts and Music as an assistant, eventually matriculating to a full professorship. In 1999 he was one of the founding professors of the university's Inter-Media Arts program. He was also one of the main organisers of the Toride Art Project, a community arts project based in Toride City in Ibaraki, Japan. More recently he had done extensive work founding the Ino Artists Village.

As an artist, Watanabe had exhibited extensively around the world, completing exhibitions in Turkey and Germany shortly before his death.

He died from sudden heart failure on November 4, 2009.
