= Aki Kawamura =

Japanese model

- Born: Aki Kawamura; October 15, 1980 (age 45); Tokyo, Japan
- Occupations: bikini model; television idol
- Modeling information
- Height: 5 ft 2 in (1.57 m)
- Hair color: Brown
- Eye color: Brown

Aki Kawamura (川村亜紀 Kawamura Aki, born October 15, 1980) is a Japanese bikini model and television idol.

She debuted in 1999 with the Yellow Cab Talent Agency. After some time out of the public eye, she joined the Spice talent agency and resumed her career. Kawamura's DVDs include Fuji Television Visual Queen of the Year '00 'Aki Kawamura' Aloha Paradise.

== Television appearances ==
- Shiritsu tantei Hama Maiku (NTV)
- Kaidan hyaku monogatari (Fuji Television)
- Yo ni mo kimyou na monogatari (Fuji Television)
- Ai wa seigi (TV Asahi)
