= Amemasu =

Mythological creature from Ainu folklore

Amemasu (雨鱒(アメマス)) or Ō-amemasu (大アメマス) (rain trout) is a giant whale- or fish-like creature from Ainu folklore. Some of the largest amemasu are said to live in Lake Mashū and Lake Shikotsu in Hokkaidō, with smaller ones inhabiting lakes throughout northern areas of Honshu. The amemasu are known for capsizing boats, creating earthquakes, and causing other natural disasters.

== Appearance ==
An amemasu is able to take on a human appearance, usually of a beautiful woman, in order to lure young men to their deaths. The skin of an amemasu is said to be cold and clammy, much like fish skin, which is how they can be identified when they are in human form.

== Legends ==
The inhabitants of Hokkaido believed that large amemasu held up the Earth. Sometimes, the fish would get tired and this could cause earthquakes, similar to the Namazu.

In Akita Prefecture, there is a place called Amemasu Otoshi (アメ鱒落し). Legend says that the amemasu was so powerful, that it was able to kill a hawk, even though it died in the end.

There is an island in the middle of Lake Kussharo in Hokkaido. The lake is said to be home to a large amemasu, whose head resembled a rock and whose tail stretched to the Kushiro River. An Ainu hero, Otashitonkuru, took a harpoon, determined to poke out the eyes of the amemasu. However, the fish started fighting back. Desperate to hold on to the harpoon, Otashitonkuru held on to a rock and the struggling amemasu pulled so hard that the rock became the island in the middle of the lake.

In one tale, the amemasu swallows a deer that has come down to the lake to drink, but the deer's antler tears open the great fish's belly and kills it. The amemasu's enormous corpse then blocks up the lake and puts it in danger of flooding. A god in the form of a bird warns the people in villages nearby. The villagers upstream escape to higher ground, but the people downstream, not believing the bird, find the amemasu's body and drag it out of the lake, after which the water comes rushing out with such force that everything downriver is washed away. That area is now the flat Konsengen'ya plain.

== Other uses ==
Amemasu is also a name given to the white-spotted char, Salvelinus leucomaenis.
