= Achiyalabopa =

Bird god of the Pueblo people

Achiyalabopa was a huge bird god of the Pueblo people. He is described as being of extraordinary size and having rainbow-colored feathers as sharp as knives. It was considered a celestial creature and may have once been attributed to the whole of creation.
