= Aki Korhonen =

Finnish ice hockey right winger

- Born: September 28, 1975 (age 49); Savonlinna, Finland
- Height: 5 ft 9 in (175 cm)
- Weight: 168 lb (76 kg; 12 st 0 lb)
- Position: Right wing
- Shot: Right
- Played for: KalPa; Blues; SaiPa
- Playing career: 1996–2010

Aki Korhonen (born September 28, 1975) is a Finnish retired professional ice hockey winger.

Korhonen played a total of 264 games in the SM-liiga, playing for KalPa, Blues and SaiPa between 1996 and 2001.

== Career statistics ==
			Regular season					Playoffs
Season	Team	League	GP	G	A	Pts	PIM	GP	G	A	Pts	PIM
1992–93	KalPa U18	U18 SM-sarja	15	10	11	21	16	—	—	—	—	—
1992–93	KalPa U20	U20 I-Divisioona	6	3	1	4	4	—	—	—	—	—
1993–94	SaPKo U20	U20 I-Divisioona	22	20	14	34	18	—	—	—	—	—
1993–94	SaPKo	I-Divisioona	13	4	1	5	0	—	—	—	—	—
1994–95	Jokerit U20	U20 SM-liiga	22	3	3	6	18	—	—	—	—	—
1995–96	KalPa U20	U20 SM-liiga	34	20	21	41	44	7	4	8	12	6
1996–97	KalPa	SM-liiga	50	11	6	17	18	—	—	—	—	—
1997–98	KalPa	SM-liiga	45	8	10	18	40	—	—	—	—	—
1998–99	KalPa	SM-liiga	54	15	9	24	38	—	—	—	—	—
1999–00	Espoo Blues	SM-liiga	50	6	7	13	28	3	0	0	0	0
2000–01	Espoo Blues	SM-liiga	37	0	1	1	6	—	—	—	—	—
2000–01	KJT	Mestis	8	1	3	4	12	—	—	—	—	—
2000–01	SaiPa	SM-liiga	4	0	1	1	0	—	—	—	—	—
2001–02	KalPa	Mestis	36	14	16	30	80	9	4	2	6	4
2002–03	ERC Haßfurt	Germany3	54	26	31	57	46	3	1	1	2	4
2003–04	KalPa	Mestis	45	12	21	33	63	11	3	7	10	4
2004–05	KalPa	Mestis	36	6	8	14	56	9	3	1	4	6
2005–06	Iisalmen Peli-Karhut	2. Divisioona	7	6	9	15	8	1	1	1	2	0
2006–07	Kotkan Titaanit	Suomi-sarja	27	13	25	38	32	4	4	2	6	8
2009–10	PiPS	2. Divisioona	6	0	4	4	12	—	—	—	—	—
SM-liiga totals			240	40	34	74	130	3	0	0	0	0
Mestis totals			125	33	48	81	211	29	10	10	20	14
