= Akurojin-no-hi =

Japanese mythological creature

Akurojin-no-hi (悪路神の火, "fire of the god of the bad road") is a ghostly flame from the folklore of Mie Prefecture, Japan. It often appears on rainy nights. People who encounter it and do not run away become gravely ill.

== See also ==
- Will-o'-the-wisp
