= Aki =

Aki or AKI may refer to:

== Places ==
- Aki District, Hiroshima, a district in Hiroshima Prefecture
- Aki, Kōchi, a city in Kochi Prefecture
- Aki District, Kōchi, a district in Kochi Prefecture
- Aki, Ōita, a town in Ōita Prefecture
- Aki Province, a former province, part of what is today Hiroshima Prefecture
- Aki Station, a rail station in Aki, Kōchi

== Gaming ==
- Syn Sophia, a video game developer, formerly AKI Corporation

== As an acronym ==
- Acute kidney injury
- Anti Knock Index of motor fuel

== People and fictional characters ==
- Aki (name), a list of people and characters with the surname, given name, nickname or stagename
- Princess Aki (Akihime) of Japan

== Other uses ==
- Akiak Airport (IATA code), airport in Akiak, Alaska
- Japanese battleship Aki, an early 20th century battleship of the Imperial Japanese Navy
- Aki (film), a Canadian documentary

== See also ==
- CCGS Waban-Aki, Canadian Coast Guard hovercraft
- Akis (disambiguation)
