= Martin Ulander =

Swedish footballer (born 1976)

Personal information
- Full name: Erik Martin Ulander
- Date of birth: 23 February 1976 (age 50)
- Place of birth: Jönköping, Sweden
- Height: 1.74 m (5 ft 9 in)
- Position: Midfielder

Senior career*
| Years | Team | Apps | (Gls) |
| 1993 | Jönköpings Södra IF | | |
| 1994–1996 | IFK Göteborg | 0 | (0) |
| 1997–2003 | Örgryte IS | 122 | (7) |
| 2004–2005 | Aarhus GF | 21 | (0) |
| 2005–2006 | IFK Göteborg | 4 | (0) |

International career
| 1991–1992 | Sweden U17 | 9 | (0) |
| 1993–1994 | Sweden U19 | 9 | (1) |
| 2001–2003 | Sweden | 4 | (0) |
- * Club domestic league appearances and goals

Erik Martin Ulander (born 23 February 1976) is a Swedish former footballer who played as a midfielder. He represented Jönköpings Södra IF, IFK Göteborg, Örgryte IS, and Aarhus GF during a career that spanned between 1993 and 2006. A full international between 2001 and 2003, he won four caps for the Sweden national team.

== Honours ==
Örgryte IS

- Svenska Cupen: 2000

Sweden

- King's Cup: 2003
