= Season Lao =

- Born: 劉善恆; 1987 (age 37–38); Macau
- Education: Macao Polytechnic Institute (currently named Macao Polytechnic University)
- Known for: Contemporary Artist

Chinese name
- Traditional Chinese: 劉善恆
- Simplified Chinese: 刘善恒

Japanese name
- Katakana: シーズン・ラオ
- Romanization: Season Lao
- Website: season-lao.com

Season Lao is a contemporary artist based in Kyoto, Japan. Born in Macau, He graduated from Macau Polytechnic University.

In 2009, his video works about communities in Macau gained acclaim. This led to the preservation of historic buildings, including his birthplace, previously scheduled for demolition as people re-evaluated their importance. This inspired Lao to pursue his artistic work further.

From 2010 to 2020, Lao was based in Hokkaido. His work during this time focused on the concept of "Engi" (縁起) or Dependent Co-arising. His artwork sought to capture the "interdependence of emptiness and reality" (虚実相生) in natural phenomena such as snow and fog. These works have since been exhibited around the world.

Lao has been based in Kyoto since 2020. During the pandemic, he created site-specific works exploring the law of included middle (容中律) in places such as Pure Land Buddhist temple gardens. His installation works seek to dissolve the boundary between subject and object, re-exploring the relationship between human nature and the external world.

Public Collections Include: Museum of Asian Arts in Nice, Cernuschi Museum, Macau Museum of Art, Chishima Foundation, The Ritz-Carlton Fukuoka, Setsu Niseko, AYA Niseko, Nipponia Mino Shokamachi etc.

== Literature ==
- Adrien Bossard. Season Lao: Une pièce vide devient blanche pour l'illumination. Musée départemental des arts asiatiques à Nice, 2023. ISBN 9784865283815
- Roberto Borghi, Andrea Giordano, Michele Pierpaoli. L'uomo e il paesaggio. Carlo Pozzoni Fotoeditore, 2015. ISBN 9788890963353
- Season Lao. Pateo do Mungo. Associacao Promotora para as Industrias Criativas na Freguesia de Aso Lazaro, 2010. ISBN 9799993771905
