= Aki Mitsugi =

Japanese artist

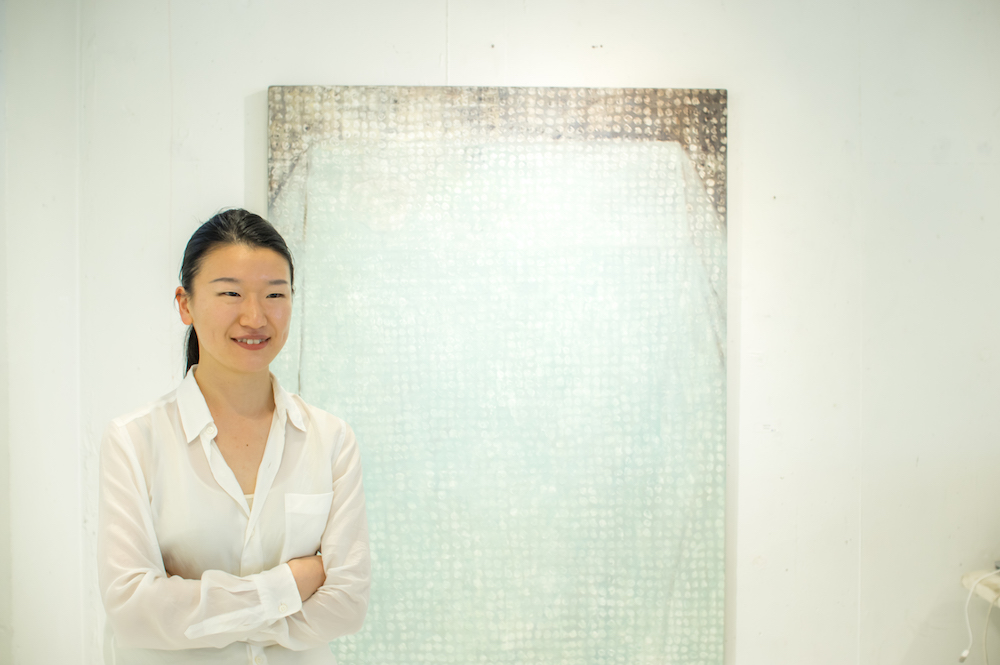
- Born: 三津木晶; 1987 (age 38–39); Kitakyushu, Fukuoka Prefecture, Japan
- Education: University of Teacher Education Fukuoka in Fukuoka
- Known for: Painting

Aki Mitsugi (三津木晶) is a contemporary Japanese artist. She was born in 1987 in Kitakyushu, Fukuoka prefecture. She graduated from the University of Teacher Education Fukuoka with a degree in Elementary School Fine Arts Education. Her paintings are created through unorthodox techniques, like the use of turpentine to remove particular layers of paint.

== Exhibitions ==
Aki Mitsugi has had her work exhibited at various locations in Japan and has collaborated with artists like Toyomi Kamekawa and Kazutaka Shioi. She has also appeared in various art fairs across Japan.

2018 Infinity Japan Contemporary Art Show

2018 ART in PARK HOTEL 2018 under Gallery Kazuki

2018 3331ART FAIR

2017 Infinity Japan Contemporary Art Show

2017 ART FAIR ASIA FUKUOKA under Gallery MORYTA

2017 Aki Mitsugi Exhibition Tablecross, GALLERY SOAP, Kitakyushu

2017 Aki Mitsugi Exhibition Tablecross, Gallery MORYTA, Fukuoka

2016 ART SAPPORO under Gallery MORYTA

2016 ART KAOHSIUNG under Gallery MORYTA

2016 ART FAIR ASIA FUKUOKA] under Gallery MORYTA

2016 Aki Mitsugi & Toyomi Kamekawa Exhibition, Gallery Kazuki, Tokyo

2015 ART FAIR ASIA FUKUOKA under Gallery MORYTA

2015 Aki Mitsugi & Toyomi Kamegawa Exhibition, caffe Otto, Fukuoka

2014 Aki Mitsugi & Toyomi Kamekawa Exhibition, Gallery MORYTA, Fukuoka

2013 Aki Mitsugi Exhibition, Komorebi, Kitakyushu

2012 Aki Mitsugi Show, ECRU

2012 Kazutaka Shioi & Aki Mitsugi exhibition, Gallery MORYTA, Fukuoka

2011 PANDEMIC HALATION, GALLERY SOAP, Kitakyushu

2011 Aki Mitsugi Show, SPITAL, Kitakyushu

2011 Aki Mitsugi Show, MOON BEAMS

2010 Aki Mitsugi Exhibition, Gallery Canvas

2010 Kazutaka Shioi & Aki Mitsugi Exhibition, GALLERY CAFFE girasole, Kitakyushu

2009 Aki Mitsugi Exhibition, Gallery Canvas
