= Aerico =

Aerika (Greek: αγερικό or Greek: αερικό) is a category of spirits from Greek folklore. They are said to be air spirits that dwell in the air and can be exorcised by priests.
