= Akateko (folklore) =

Yokai

An akateko (赤手児; lit. "red child's hand") is a yōkai, or Japanese monster, from the folklore of Aomori Prefecture, specifically in the city of Hachinohe. The monster is also a legend local to Kagawa and Fukushima prefectures.

== Mythology ==
The monster is described as the red, disembodied hand of a small child descending from a Japanese honey locust tree. It is accompanied by the specter of a young woman (around the age of 17 or 18) at the base of the tree whose beauty lulls unsuspecting passersby into a trance or fever state.

According to some legends, the hand will then grab the traveler by the neck and rip them apart, limb by limb, but in most stories the hand is harmless. In Kagawa and Fukushima prefectures, the spirit will travel in pairs, resembling moving feet or legs. Some even suggest that those two creatures are, in fact, two parts of the same yōkai. In other versions of the story, the hand is entirely cold and lifeless.

According to most sources, this creature is harmless, and only frighten passers-by.

A theory pointed that Akateko may be an illusion created by other yōkai such as kitsune or tanuki, who have shape-shifting abilities.
