= Sori Choi =

South Korean percussionist

Sori Choi (Korean: 최소리) is a South Korean percussionist, known for performing both traditional Korean musical styles and contemporary art music by modern composers.

Choi was born in Seoul, South Korea. She began learning how to play the janggu at age 6. Choi studied traditional Korean percussion instruments at the National High School of Korean Music and at the Music College of Seoul National University. She is a student of two Important Intangible Cultural Properties of Korea master percussionists, learning the janggu with Kim Yeong-taek and the soribuk (the barrel drum used in pansori) with Park Geun-young.

In 2010, Choi began touring internationally with the Korean Music Project (KMP), sponsored by South Korea's Ministry of Culture, Sports and Tourism. She has given world premieres by many Korean and European contemporary composers, and has given presentations, performances, and workshops on traditional Korean percussion instruments at many international music festivals, including the 2012 and 2014 Darmstädter Ferienkurse (Darmstadt International Summer Courses for New Music).
