= Aki Kuroda =

Japanese painter

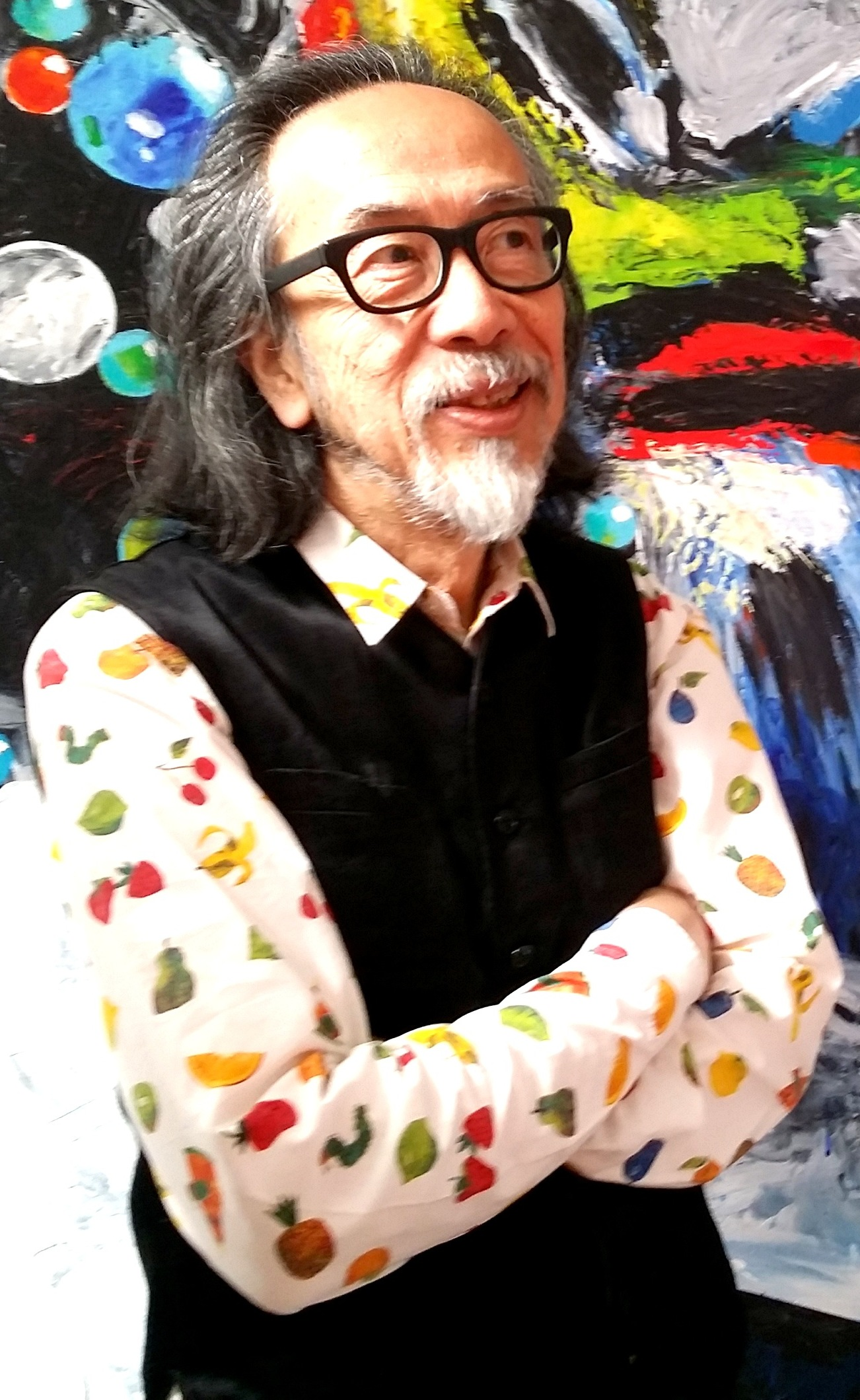
- Aki in his atelier
- Born: 黒田アキ; October 4, 1944; Kyoto, Japan
- Known for: Painting, Printmaking

Aki Kuroda (黒田 アキ, Kuroda Aki; 4 October 1944), real name Akihiko Kuroda (黒田 明比古, Kuroda Akihiko), is a Japanese painter based in Paris, France.

Aki Kuroda, well known for his silhouettes and figures painted with line strokes, which has been considered like a symbol of "passage" to the labyrinth. Since 1992, he has continued to produce a fluxional interactive art spectacle/installation named "COSMOGARDEN" (the cosmic garden).

== Biography ==
Aki Kuroda's father was a professor of economics at Doshisha University. As the only child, Aki Kuroda was raised in a family open to European culture. He began painting at a very young age.

In 1994, Aki Kuroda participated in an exhibition as part of the São Paulo Biennale.

He has created murals for the Leonardo da Vinci University Center, the Japanese cultural House in Paris, the café of the Strasbourg Museum of Modern and Contemporary Art in Strasbourg, for the city of Paris in 2000 and for the École nationale des douanes in Tourcoing (a work registered in the supplementary inventory of historical monuments in 2009).

He designed the sets for the ballet Parade for Angelin Preljocaj at the Paris Opera and the Avignon Festival in 1993. He collaborated with architects such as Tadao Ando and Richard Rogers to create relief paintings in Japan.

== Exhibitions ==
Année	
2021	Yoyo Maeght Gallery, Paris
2021	Galerie Louis Gendre, Chamalières, Clermont Métropole
2020	Richard Taittinger Gallery, New York, États-Unis
2019	Musée des Beaux-Arts de Chartres, Chartres
2019	Musée Lapidaire, Avignon, curated by Yoyo Maeght
2019	Salle des Dominicains, Saint-Emilion
2018	Aquarium de Paris, curated by Yoyo Maeght
2018	Hangar Art Center, Bruxelles, Belgique
2016	Galerie Louis Gendre, Chamalières, Clermont Métropole
2015	Galerie Nikki Diana Marquardt, Paris
2015	Galerie Louis Gendre, Chamalières, Clermont Métropole
2015	Centre d’Art des Sablons, Neuilly sur Seine
2014	Galerie Alexandre Lazarew, Paris
2014	Biwako Biennale, Japon
2013	KH Gallery, Tokyo, Japon
2011	Nori Yu Gallery, Tokyo, Japon
2010	Maison Européenne de la Photographie, Paris
2010	Centre d’Art de Saint-Emilion
2008	Doland Museum, Shanghai, Chine
2007	TS1 Museum, Beijing, Chine
2007	Beijing Imperial Museum, Chine
2004	Espace culturel des Arts, Trèbes
2002	Musée Château de Bellecour, Pithiviers
2001	Scène Nationale d’Orléans
1998	Galerie Ham, Nagoya, Japon
1998	Galerie Proarta, Zurich, Suisse
1997	Casa França-Brasil, Rio de Janeiro, Brésil
1997	La Manufacture des Œillets, Ivry
1997	Otemae Art Center, Kobe, Japon
1978	Kunsthalle, Bremerhaven, Allemagne

== Books ==
- COSMOGARDEN COSMOJUNGLE (ed.) Seigensha, Japan, 2007.ISBN 978-4-86152-104-1 website
- KURODA, (ed.) Maeght, France, 2002. ISBN 2-86941-307-6 website
