= Aki Sirkesalo =

- Born: Aki Pekka Antero Sirkesalo; 25 July 1962; Toijala, Finland
- Died: 26 December 2004 (aged 42) Khao Lak, Thailand
- Genres: Funk, soul, rock, pop
- Occupations: Singer, musician, songwriter, broadcaster
- Instrument: Vocals
- Years active: 1984–2004
- Label: Sony Music Entertainment

Aki Pekka Antero Sirkesalo (25 July 1962 – 26 December 2004) was a Finnish singer and broadcaster who was killed in the 2004 Indian Ocean tsunami in Thailand.

== Career ==
Sirkesalo started his public career in 1984 as an announcer in the Yle radio show Rockradio. In 1986, he formed a band called Giddyups and later a successful a cappella group Veeti and the Velvets. Sirkesalo released his first solo album Mielenrauhaa in 1995. He went on to make four more solo albums, the last of which, Sanasta miestä, was released posthumously in February 2005. Sirkesalo also hosted music-related TV shows for the Finnish Broadcasting Company.

== Death ==
Sirkesalo drowned after being struck by the Indian Ocean tsunami while on holiday in Khao Lak, Thailand, on 25 December 2004, which also killed his wife Johanna, 38, and their eight-year-old son Sampo and four-year-old daughter Saana. They lie buried in Toijala. Before his death, Sirkesalo lived with his family for the last few years of his life in Klaukkala, Nurmijärvi.

His birth town Toijala commemorated him by naming a street as Sirkesalontie. He had left a lot of unpublished music and lyrics before his death, which has been recorded by various artists.

== Solo albums ==
Year	Title	Chart
Year	Title	FIN
1995	Mielenrauhaa	5
1996	Aika	3
1998	Kissanelämää	5
2001	Enkeleitä onko heitä	5
2002	Halutuimmat	9
2005	Sanasta miestä	1
2006	30 unohtumatonta laulua	31
2009	The Essential Aki Sirkesalo	—
