= Aki Ulander =

Finnish basketball player (born 1981)

Aki Ulander (born 29 December 1981 in Oulu) is a Finnish basketball player. He stands 6'10 tall and weighs 255lbs. Ulander has been a member of the Finland national basketball team for several years.

== Career ==
=== Season 2008-2009: ===
- Swedish Championship League: Sundsvall Dragons, Sundsvall, Sweden

=== Past seasons ===
- Lappeenrannan NMKY, Lappeenranta, Finland / FIBA Eurocup: Team Lappeenranta
- Sallen Basket, Uppsala, Sweden
- Namika Lahti, Lahti, Finland
- Ciudad De Palencia, Palencia, Spain
- Honka Playboys, Espoo, Finland
- Pussihukat, Vantaa, Finland

=== Titles ===
Latest:

- Swedish League: League Champion 2009
- Finnish League: Bronze Medal 2008
- Finnish League: Regular Season Champion 2008
- Finnish Cup: Cup Champion 2007
- Finnish League: Regular Season Champion 2004
- Finnish League: League Champion 2003
- Finnish League: Regular Season Champion 2000
