= Ani Hyuntikwalaski =

Mythological beings

In Native American mythology (particularly in the Cherokee tribe) the Ani Hyuntikwalaski ("Thunder Beings") are beings that cause lightning fire in a hollow sycamore tree.
