= Aki Kangasmäki =

Finnish ice hockey player

- Born: May 24, 1989 (age 35); Rauma, Finland
- Height: 190 cm (6 ft 3 in)
- Weight: 97 kg (214 lb; 15 st 4 lb)
- Position: Forward
- Shot: Left
- Played for: Lukko; Hokki; Vaasan Sport; TUTO Hockey; KooKoo; KeuPa HT; Karhu HT
- Playing career: 2006–2019

Aki Kangasmäki (born May 24, 1989) is a Finnish ice hockey player who currently plays professionally in Finland for Lukko of the SM-liiga.

== Career statistics ==
			Regular season					Playoffs
Season	Team	League	GP	G	A	Pts	PIM	GP	G	A	Pts	PIM
2003–04	Lukko U16	U16 SM-sarja	19	11	15	26	24	—	—	—	—	—
2004–05	Lukko U16	U16 SM-sarja	20	19	3	22	45	5	5	1	6	4
2005–06	Lukko U18	U18 SM-sarja	24	6	12	18	16	—	—	—	—	—
2005–06	Lukko U20	U20 SM-liiga	14	3	0	3	14	9	0	0	0	0
2006–07	Chilliwack Bruins	WHL	60	4	4	8	19	4	0	0	0	0
2007–08	Lukko U20	U20 SM-liiga	40	15	17	32	57	—	—	—	—	—
2008–09	Lukko U20	U20 SM-liiga	42	13	18	31	34	8	3	2	5	2
2008–09	Suomi U20	Mestis	1	0	0	0	0	—	—	—	—	—
2009–10	Lukko U20	U20 SM-liiga	32	19	20	39	36	9	3	4	7	10
2009–10	Hokki	Mestis	13	9	3	12	6	—	—	—	—	—
2010–11	Lukko	SM-liiga	14	0	2	2	27	2	0	0	0	14
2010–11	Hokki	Mestis	31	14	8	22	30	—	—	—	—	—
2011–12	Lukko	SM-liiga	25	1	2	3	4	3	0	1	1	0
2011–12	Vaasan Sport	Mestis	21	14	12	26	18	—	—	—	—	—
2012–13	Lukko	SM-liiga	45	4	3	7	18	14	0	0	0	2
2012–13	Vaasan Sport	Mestis	10	5	2	7	0	—	—	—	—	—
2013–14	Lukko	Liiga	24	3	1	4	6	—	—	—	—	—
2013–14	TUTO Hockey	Mestis	1	0	0	0	0	—	—	—	—	—
2014–15	KooKoo	Mestis	45	12	22	34	8	9	0	0	0	2
2015–16	KooKoo	Liiga	44	5	10	15	12	—	—	—	—	—
2016–17	Hokki	Mestis	9	3	3	6	4	—	—	—	—	—
2016–17	KeuPa HT	Mestis	12	8	7	15	0	—	—	—	—	—
2016–17	Lukko	Liiga	26	1	1	2	8	—	—	—	—	—
2017–18	TUTO Hockey	Mestis	32	6	11	17	14	18	3	7	10	12
2018–19	Karhu HT	Suomi-sarja	1	1	0	1	0	—	—	—	—	—
SM-liiga totals			178	14	19	33	75	20	0	1	1	16
Mestis totals			175	71	68	139	80	27	3	7	10	14
