= Aki Yli-Salomäki =

Finnish composer

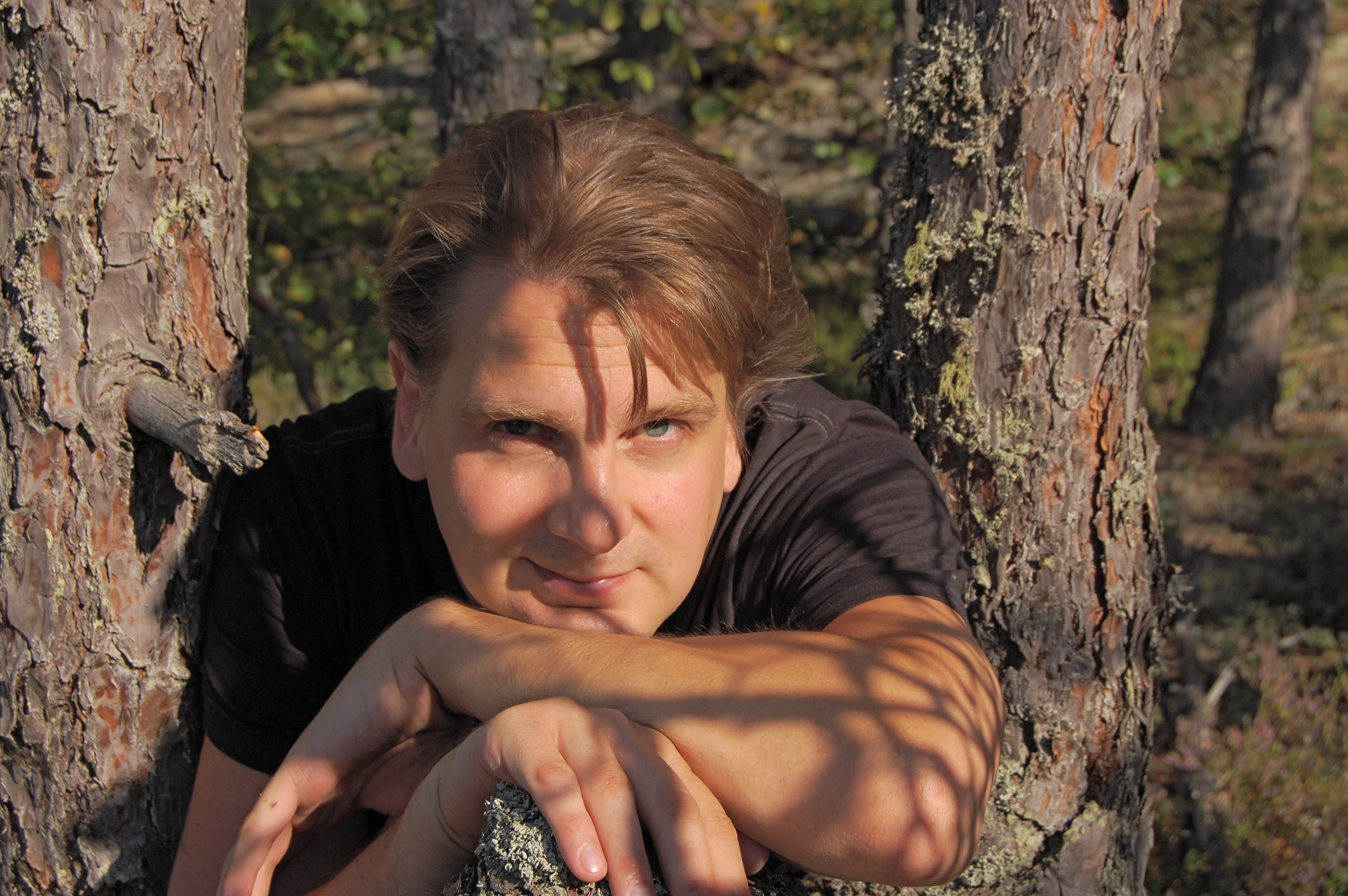
Aki Yli-Salomäki

Aki Yli-Salomäki (born 1972 in Tampere) is a Finnish composer, music critic and music journalist. Yli-Salomäki's main musical area is contemporary classical music, but he works also as a composer and producer of popular music and ambient music. Yli-Salomäki forms the electro-pop duo Ouden with baroque singer and performance artist Debi Wongl and he is founding member of hardcore punk band Puhelinkoppi. He makes ambient music under the name Osa7029.

== Career ==
Yli-Salomäki studied musicology and literature at the University of Helsinki. He studied composition initially with Jouni Kaipainen and Juhani Nuorvala. Later he studied composition and orchestration with Harri Vuori at the University of Helsinki in 1998–1999 and privately in 2000–2002. Yli-Salomäki has worked as a radio journalist in Yleisradio, particularly focusing on contemporary classical music in programs like Aikamme suomalaista musiikkia (2012–) and "Uudet levyt" (2018–). He works also as a music critic.

== Musical style ==
In his music, Yli-Salomäki hasput particular focus on timbral issues, temporal experience, and the aesthetics of space and "landscape" in music. Especially in the 2010s, his music was often slow, calm and focused, as evidenced by the titles of many works, for instance the "Lingering" series for solo various instruments. Stylistically Yli-Salomäki's work draws on, for example, post-minimalism, colorism, neo-mysticism and slow music thinking. Slow-moving but intense surfaces and flowing sequences are typical of his music.

== List of works ==
=== Orchestral ===
- Ei mittään - Never Mind (2018–2019) (15') for orchestra
- Onnelmia (2014–2016) for orchestra (24')
- Uneen... (2015–2016) for orchestra (12')
- Uinukainen (2015) for string orchestra (version for string orchestra. Original version is written for string quartet) (11')
- Kaarella (2009–2010) for orchestra (9')
- Lull (2008/2010) for orchestra (10')
- Speak, memory (2007) for orchestra (16')
- Random Layers on Open Space (2006) for orchestra (10')
- Ilmassa (2005) for sting orchestra (6')
- Lava (2003) for symphonic wind orchestra (10')
- Drift (2003–2004) for string orchestra (23')

=== Works for soloist with orchestra ===
- Yhtenäisyys (Unity) (2018–2019) for flute and orchestra (21')
- Oi autuus (2015–2016) for cello and orchestra (24')
- Ilmanvaloa (2013–2014) for clarinet and orchestra (31')
- Täplät (2009) for oboe and orchestra (15')
- Gently Flow Silent Streams (2008/2010) for oboe and orchestra (6')
- Species – In Action (2005–2006/2010) concerto for percussion and orchestra (17')
- Smaller and Smaller (2005) concerto for guitar and orchestra (17')
- Kamarisinfonia nro 1 "ALLA" (2004–2005) for flute, clarinet, plucked instruments and string orchestra (38')
- Arpian images (2003) concerto for vibraphone, glockenspiel and string orchestra (30')
- Viulukonsertto (2002) for violin and string orchestra (18')
- Klarinettikonsertto (2001/2004) for clarinet and string orchestra (14')
- .lagh (2000) concertino for flute and string orchestra (10')

=== Vocal and choral works ===
- Les Hymnes de Bilitis (The Hymns of Bilitis) (2014) mezzo-soprano, violin and cello (8')
- Aukea (2010–2013) for throat-singer and orchestra (18')
- Sekunneista kiinni (2011–2012) for mixed chorus (11')
- Haihtuvaa (2010–2011) for female chorus and orchestra (30')
- Uumenissa (2008) for mixed chorus (8')
- Mistä osasit (2005) for mixed chorus (6')

=== Works with large ensambles ===
- Harhoja (2014–2015) for chamber ensemble (string quartet and wind quartet) (13')
- Väreitä (2014–2015) for clarinet, horn, piano and string quartet (15')
- Süvendus (2011) for ensemble (13')
- Colours in Linear Landscapes (2005–2006) for ensemble (10')
- Rata (2005) for big band (4')
- More (2001–2002) for big band (7')

=== Chamber ===
- Uusi yritys (2018–2019) for string quartet (8')
- Raukeaa (2019) violin, cello and piano (8')
- Helpottaa jo (2019) guitar and violin (6')
- Muistiainen (2018–2019) clarinet, violin, viola and cello (10')
- Sellaisenaan (As It Is) (2017) for string quartet (26')
- Uinukainen (2015) for string quartet (10')
- Versoja (2013–2014) for oboe, violin, tape ja aerial acrobat (23')
- Raanu (2012) for violin and guitar (also versions for violin and kantele, guitar and flute, flute and kantele) (9')
- Paikka (2012) for throat-singer and oboe (7')
- Täälläolo (2010) for string quartet (8')
- Valotomu (2010–2011) for guitar and string quartet (17')
- Nightfall (2010–2011) for clarinet and string quartet (12')
- Excerpt (2006) for guitar, cello and piano (5')
- Atmos (2003) for two guitars and two flutes (9')

=== Solo ===
- Viipyillen (Lingering) (2010–2013), cycle for various solo instruments (30')
- Preview (2011) clarinet (7')
- Jälkitiloja – viisi miniatyyriä (2010–2011) piano (7')
- Hidasta (2010) cello (6')
- Mailla (2010) viola (6')
- Odota (2010) guitar (6')

== Prizes ==
- First prize in the Chamber Music Seinäjoki 2005 -competition (Colours in Linear Landscapes)
- The University of Helsinki Pacius-award 2005

== Discography ==
- 2013 – Odota, Otto Tolonen, guitar, Sibarecords SACD-1011 (Toccata: Finnish Guitar Music / Otto Tolonen)
- 2015 – Raanu, Sami Junnonen, flute, Eva Alkula, kantele, Sibarecords SRCD-1016 (Laet lauloi / Sami Junnonen, flute)
