= Charles Reef =

Shoal in Haven County, Connecticut

Coordinates: 41.249°N 72.625°W

Charles Reef is a small rocky shoal about half a mile (0.8 kilometers) south and west of Madison Reef, off the coast of Madison in New Haven County, Connecticut. It is between 7 and 18 feet deep and surrounded by deeper waters. A buoy marks the location.

== See also ==
- Round Rock, Madison
- Tuxis Island
- Gull Rock, Madison
- Thimble Islands
- Madison Reef
- Outer Lands
