= Tuxis Pond =

- Location within Connecticut Location within the United States
- Location: New Haven County, Connecticut
- Coordinates: 41°16′51.3″N 72°35′50″W
- Type: lake

Tuxis Pond, occasionally spelled Tunxis, is a small pond located in the town of Madison in New Haven County, Connecticut. The pond is 3.58 acres (1.45 ha) in area. Three small streams run into it, and one runs out to sea. Tuxis Pond is about three feet (0.9 m) above sea level. The shores are mostly rocky with little sand or soil. Many nearby businesses have taken the name of the pond, including a lumber company, bookseller, grill, highway, golf club, art show, and assisted living facility.

The pond was previously known to Native Americans as Tuxisshoag or Tuckshishoag.

The pond is bordered on its western edge by the Tuxis Pond Walkway, an elevated boardwalk that permits viewing of the pond's wetland habitats. The walkway was contentiously approved in 1994 at an initial cost of $350,000, and an additional $400,000 in state funds were secured for the walkway's refurbishment in 2016.

== Flora and fauna ==
The pond is home to a vast array of fish, amphibians, and reptiles, as well as semi-aquatic mammals and birds. Other native birds and mammals use the pond as well. The most common bird seen there is the piping plover.

The pond is surrounded by trees on most parts, as well as grass and shrubs. The pond itself is host to several varieties of water plants. The areas surrounded by trees are a small, typical New England forest, mainly deciduous trees with some evergreens. The underbrush, too, consists of all the expected grasses, mosses, ferns, and shrubs. The canopy provides adequate shade for some cooler climate lichens. There are many fungi, as well. There are often algal blooms in the warmer months.

== Folklore ==
The Algonquin in the area claimed that Odziozo, the great giant, created Tuxis Pond after following a flock of geese from his newly carved-out Lake Champlain. They led him down the glaciers to what today is Madison. He scooped out some earth, forming the pit that would become Tuxis Pond, and flung it out to sea to create Tuxis Island. As he flung it, a single rock fell from his hand and is now known as Samson Rock. This rock has a somewhat foot-shaped groove in the top, supposedly from when Odziozo turned around to go home and stepped on it. The pond filled up with the water that splashed out of the sound when Tuxis Island hit the water.

This same legend was sometimes told by Europeans with the role of Odziozo being given to the biblical Samson.

== See also ==
- Tuxis Island
- Samson Rock
- Lake Champlain
- Rock Dunder
- Odziozo
