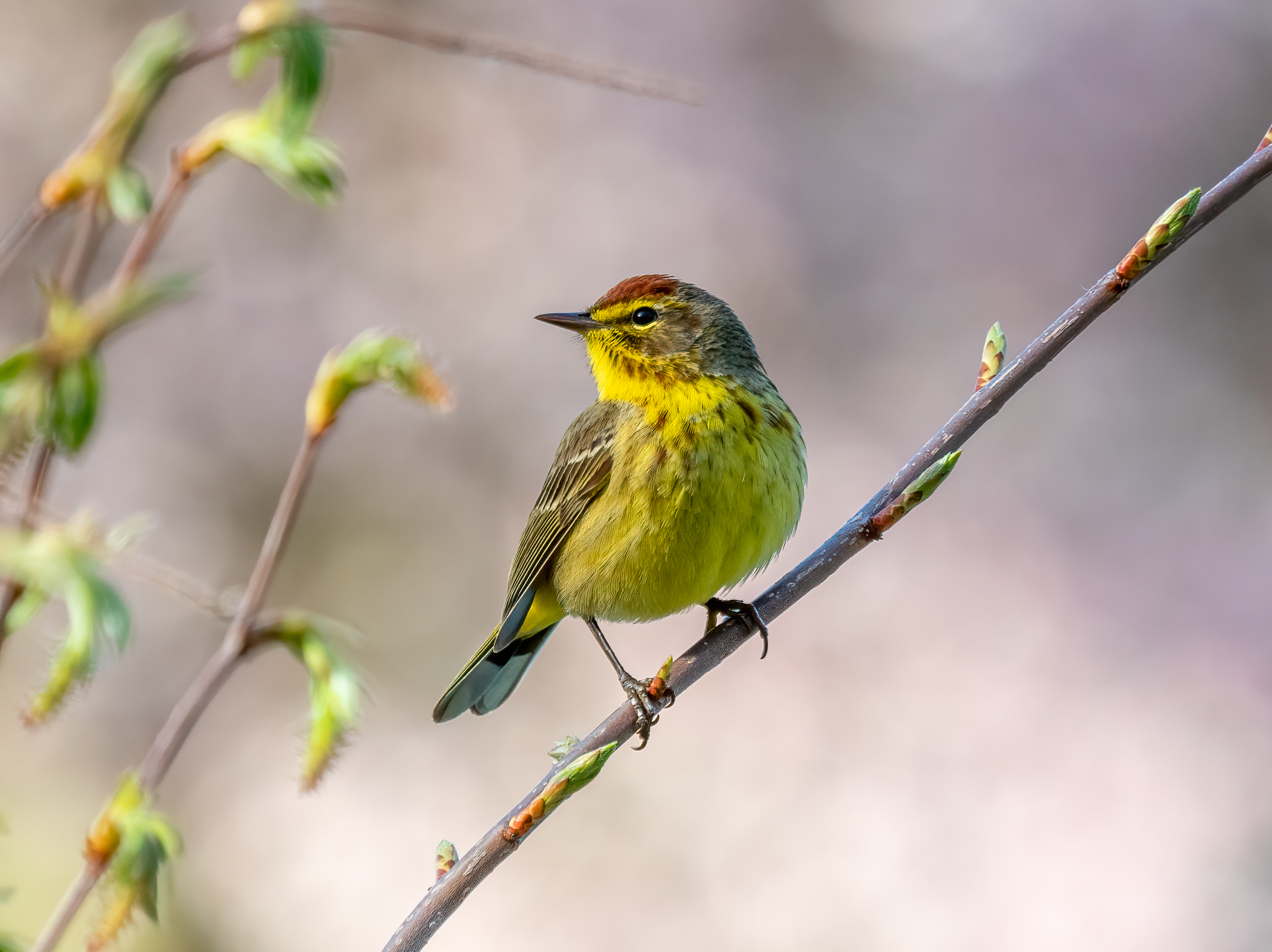
- Subspecies hypochrysea in breeding plumage

Conservation status
- Least Concern (IUCN 3.1)

Scientific classification
- Kingdom: Animalia
- Phylum: Chordata
- Class: Aves
- Order: Passeriformes
- Family: Parulidae
- Genus: Setophaga
- Species: S. palmarum

Binomial name
- Setophaga palmarum (Gmelin, 1789)
- Breeding range Wintering range Note: map is missing distribution in New York State and New England

Synonyms
- Dendroica palmarum (Gmelin, 1789); Motacilla palmarum (Gmelin, 1789); Sylvia citrinella (Wilson, 1810)

= Palm warbler =

Species of bird

The palm warbler (Setophaga palmarum) is a small songbird in the New World warbler family.

== Description ==
Measurements:

- Length: 12–14 cm (4.7–5.5 in)
- Wingspan: 20–21 cm (7.9–8.3 in)
- Weight: 8.5–14.2 g (0.30–0.50 oz)

== Taxonomy ==
The species comprises two subspecies, with fairly extensive intergradation and mixing where they meet.

- S. p. palmarum ("brown palm warbler" or "western palm warbler") inhabits the western two-thirds of the breeding range, and migrates southeast to winter on the Atlantic coast from Delaware to Florida (with a few on the Gulf coast west to Louisiana). It has much less yellow below, with less colorful streaking, and cold grayish-brown upper parts.
- S. p. hypochrysea ("yellow palm warbler" or "eastern palm warbler") of the eastern third of the breeding range, and migrates southwest to winter on the Gulf coast from western Florida to Texas; it migrates later in the fall than its western counterpart. It has brownish-olive upper parts and thoroughly yellow underparts with bold rufous breast and flank streaking.

== Distribution ==
Palm warblers breed in open coniferous bogs and edge east of the Continental Divide, across Canada and the northeastern United States. The bird breeds in the United States, Canada and Saint Pierre and Miquelon, and is also found in non-breeding populations throughout eastern North America, Central America and the Caribbean, as far south as Panama. There have also been occasional vagrant occurrences in parts of South America, Bermuda, Iceland and the United Kingdom. The palm warbler's habitat includes shrublands, forests, grasslands, wetlands, and human-modified environments.

These birds migrate to the southeastern United States, the Yucatán Peninsula, islands of the Caribbean, and eastern Nicaragua south to Panama to winter. They are one of the earlier migrants to return to their breeding grounds in the spring, often completing their migration almost two months before most other warblers. Unlike most Setophaga species, the palm warbler's winter range includes much of the Atlantic coast of North America, extending as far north as southern Nova Scotia. Every year since 1900 the palm warbler has been observed during Christmas Bird Count activities in Massachusetts, and consistently since 1958 in Nova Scotia. For the interval 1966–2015 the palm warbler population increased throughout much of its northernmost breeding range.

The palm warbler has been recorded as a vagrant to Iceland.

== Behavior ==
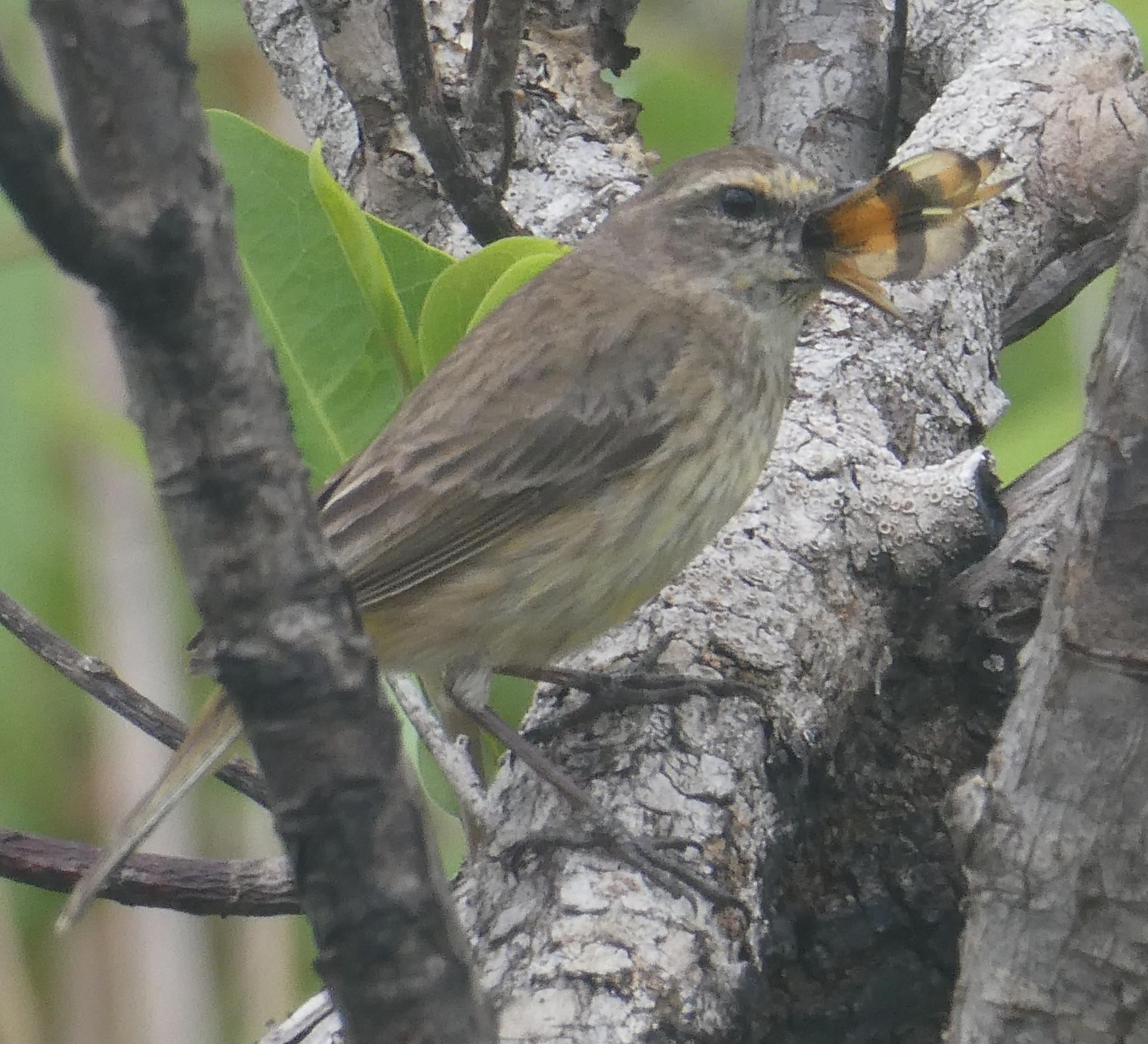
Eating a Halloween pennant

Palm warbler nests take the form of an open cup, usually situated on or near the ground in an open area.

Palm warblers forage on the ground much more than other warblers, sometimes flying to catch insects. These birds mainly eat insects and berries. Their constant tail bobbing is an identifying characteristic. Kirtland's, prairie, and palm warblers are the only Setophaga species that incessantly bob their tails.

The song of this bird is a monotonous buzzy trill. The call is a sharp chek.

== Gallery ==
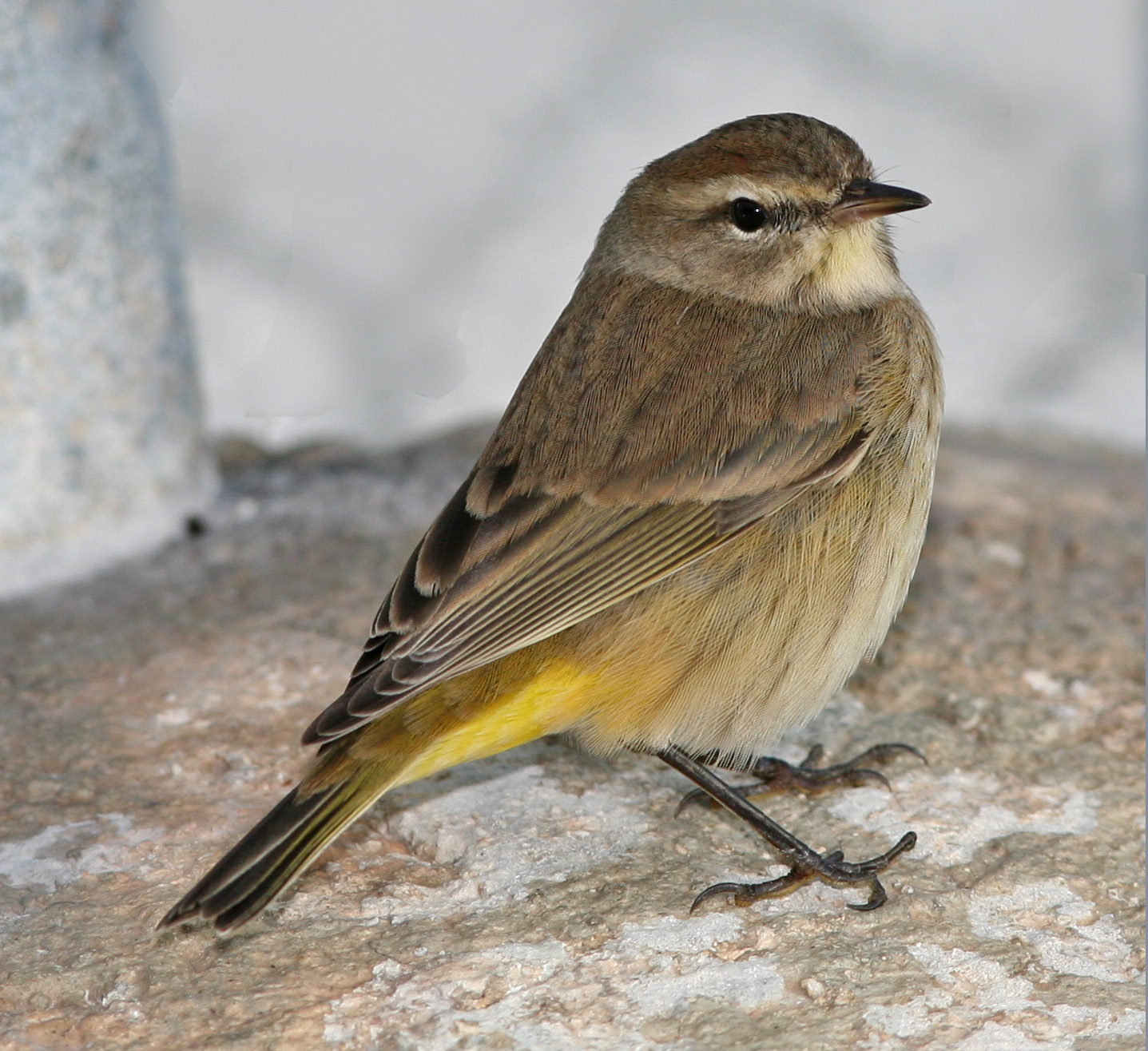
Western subspecies (S. p. palmarum), in non-breeding plumage

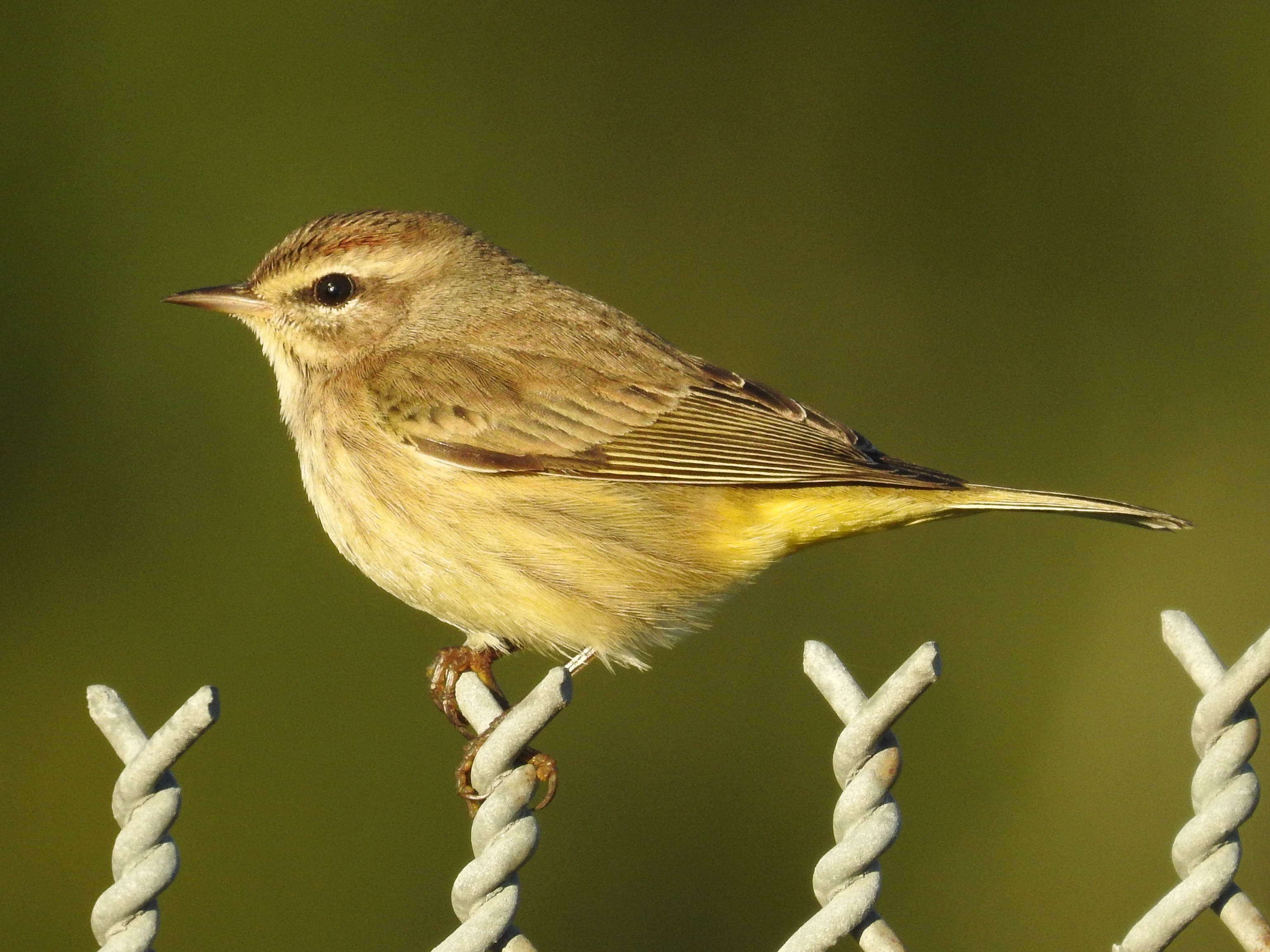
Non-breeding plumage, Florida, US

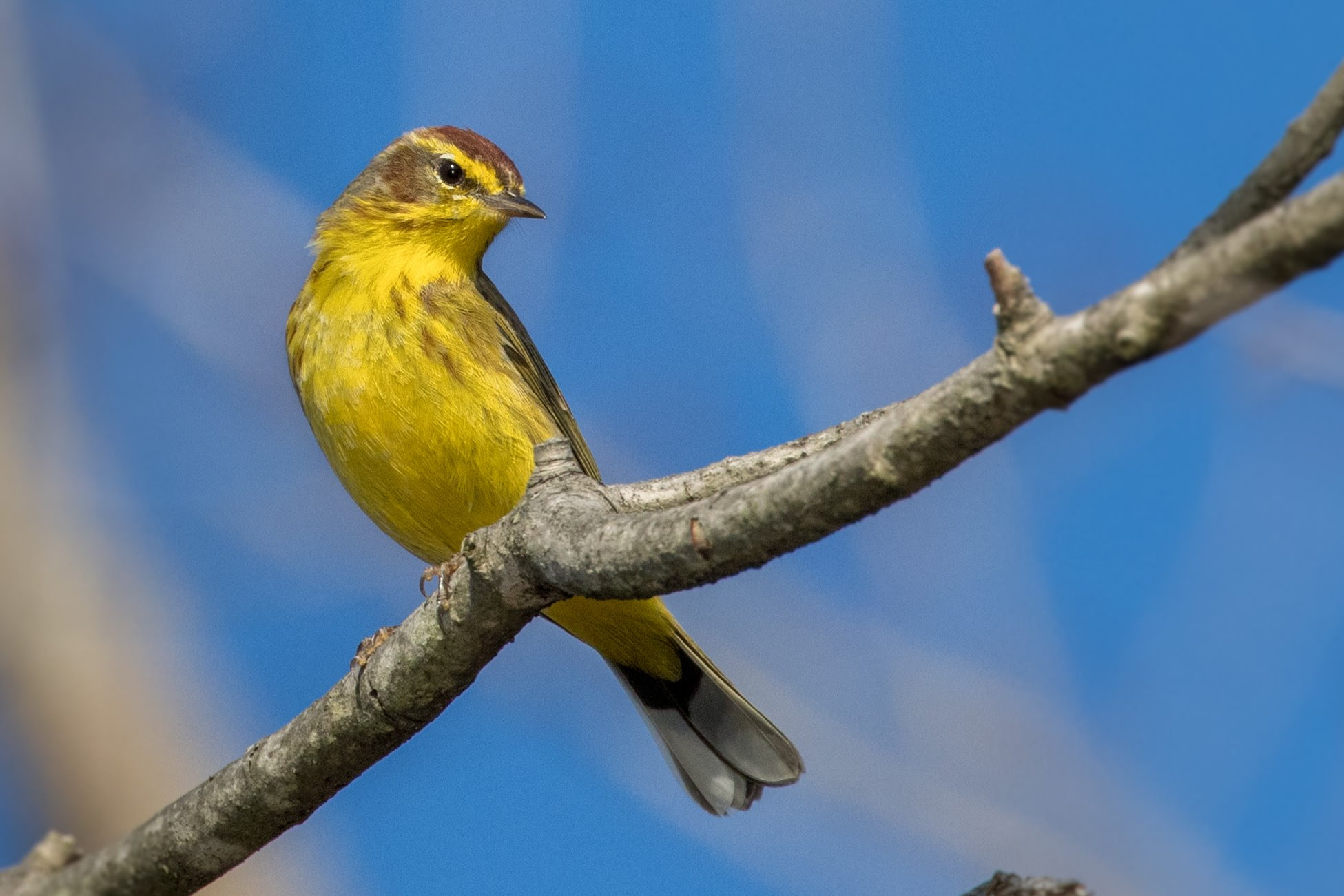
A palm warbler during its spring migration

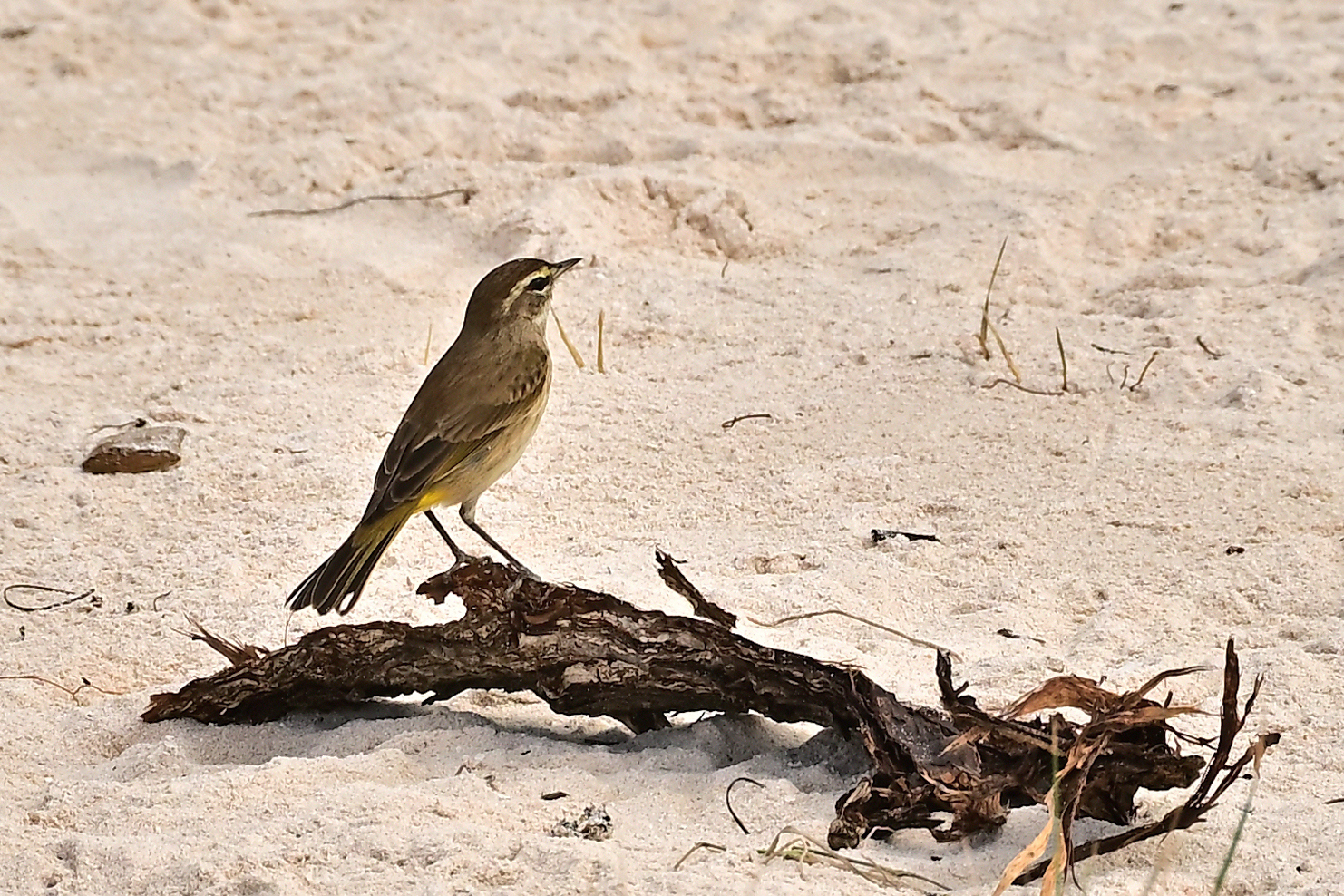
Palm warbler at Cayo Jutias (Cuba) in February

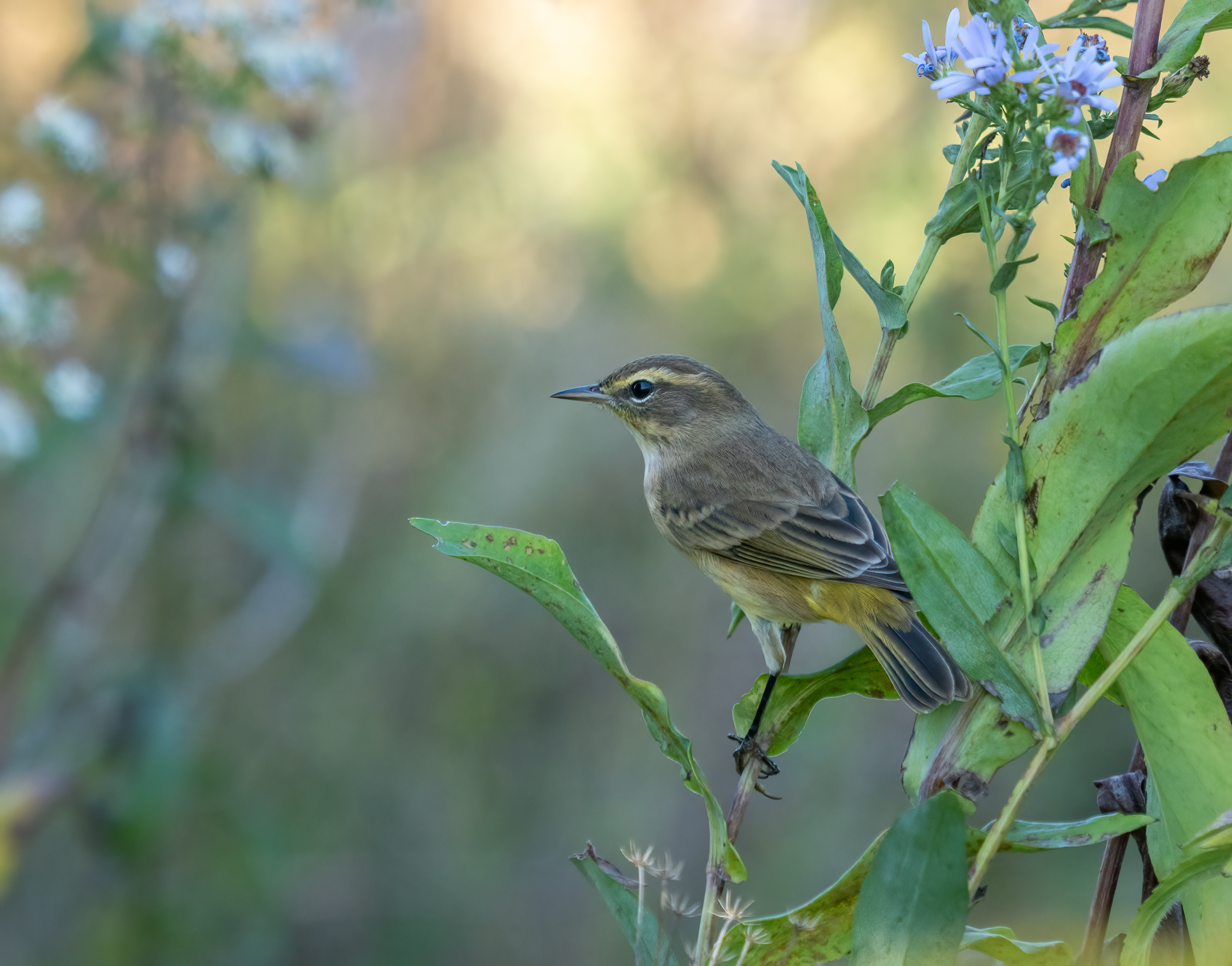
Palm warbler in a meadow in New York

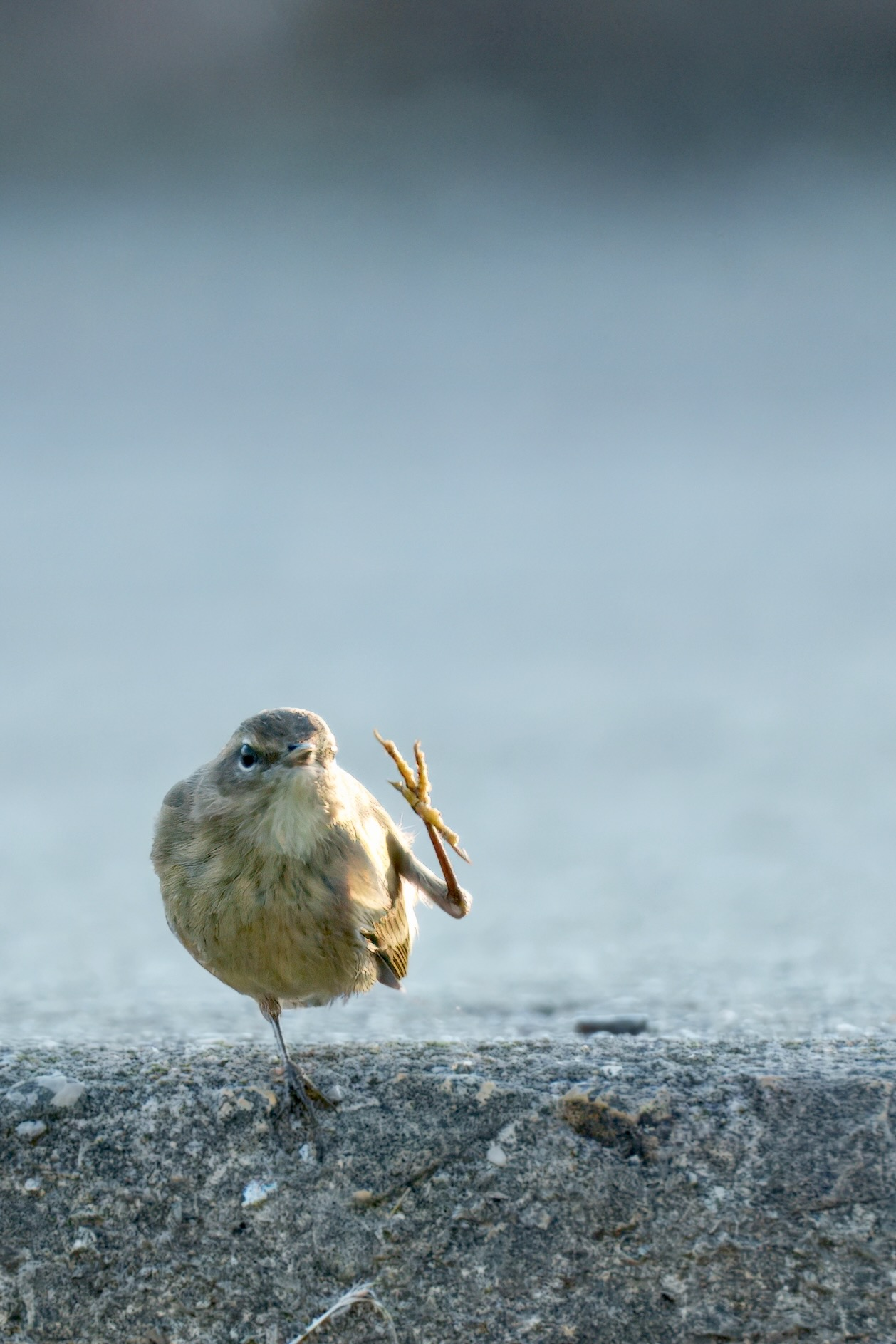
About to take flight, at Montrose Point Bird Sanctuary, Chicago
