= Monty and Rose =

Pair of piping plovers in Chicago, US

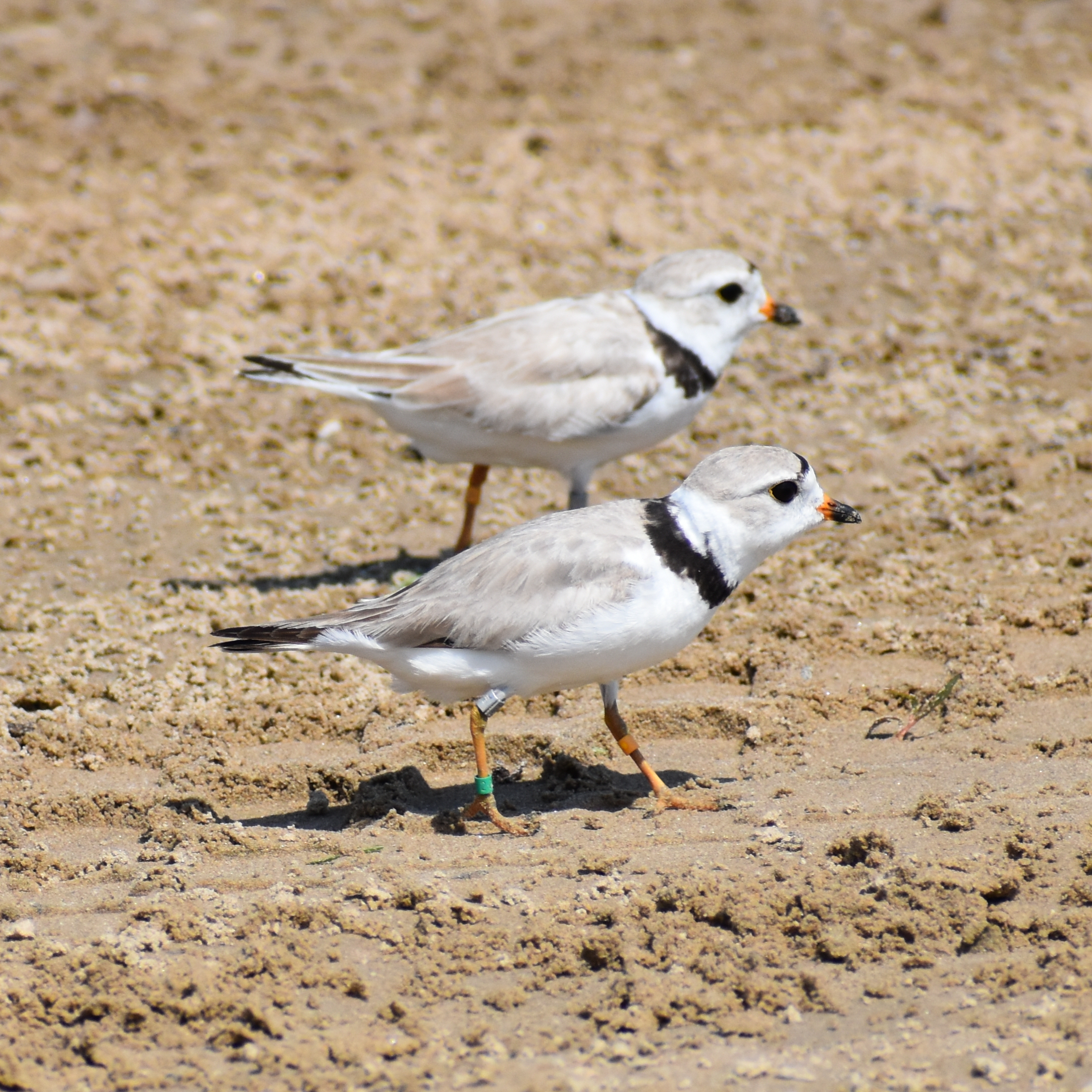
- Monty and Rose at Montrose Beach in 2020
- Species: Charadrius melodus
- Known for: First piping plovers to nest in Chicago in several decades
- Named after: Montrose Beach

Monty (June 2017 – May 13, 2022) and Rose (died circa 2022) were a pair of Great Lakes Piping Plovers, who gained local fame in 2019 for being the first pair to successfully breed in Chicago in decades. They belonged to the critically endangered Great Lakes population of piping plovers, which has around 90 breeding pairs in total as of 2026, up from about a dozen in 1990. They annually nested at Montrose Beach in the summer and nested separately in the winter, with Monty in Galveston, Texas, and Rose in Anclote Key, Florida. The pair, who had previously tried and failed to nest in a Waukegan parking lot, and later moved to Montrose Beach. The discovery generated much excitement in the local birding community, with a concert planned to be held on the beach cancelled and over 150 people volunteering to monitor the pair. Monty and Rose successfully fledged chicks in 2019, 2020, and 2021. They successfully fledged a pair of chicks in 2019, but the chicks were not banded, so their subsequent whereabouts, and whether they successfully nested, is unknown. In 2020, they had a clutch of four with three named Hazel, Esperanza and Nish successfully fledging. In 2021 they had a clutch of four, losing two chicks while the survivors, named Imani and Siewka successfully fledged. Nish garnered its own fame when it and its partner, named Nellie, became the first piping plover pair to successfully nest in Ohio in 83 years, having their own successful clutch. Shortly after arriving back in Chicago on May 13, 2022, Monty was found stumbling and short of breath, and died that evening of a respiratory infection. The whereabouts and well-being of Rose are currently unknown. Rose did not return to Montrose in 2022, and having never been sighted again, is presumed dead.

== Legacy ==
In honor of the pair, November 18 was declared Piping Plover Day in Illinois by state governor J.B. Pritzker.

A 2-part documentary about the pair, titled Monty and Rose and Monty and Rose 2: The World of Monty and Rose respectively, was produced and released by local filmmaker Bob Dolgan, originally for Piping Plover Day.

In 2021, a children's book about the pair was published, called Monty and Rose Nest at Montrose. It was written by honorary "Plovermother" Tamima Itani with illustrations by Anna-Maria Crum. Itani and Crum followed up with another collaboration in 2022 called Monty and Rose Return to Montrose.

In 2024, an expansion to the Montrose Dune Natural Area, where Monty and Rose nested, was named the Monty and Rose Wildlife Habitat in their honor.

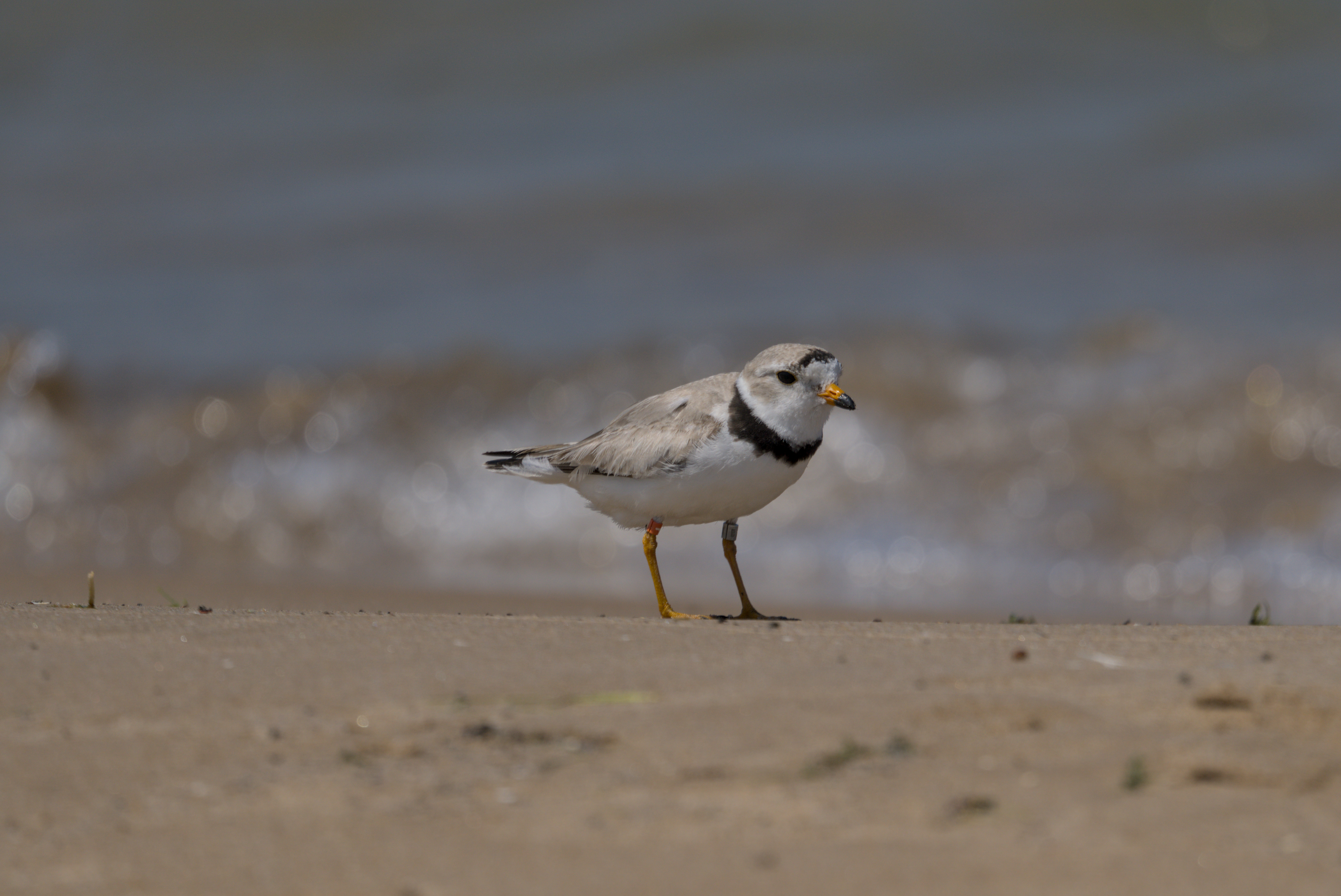
Imani, offspring of Monty and Rose, at Montrose Beach in 2026

Imani returned to Montrose Beach in 2023. In 2024, he was joined by Sea Rocket, a female piping plover who was raised in captivity and released at Montrose the previous summer, and they laid a nest with one chick surviving to fledge.They each returned to Montrose in 2025 and 2026, again laying eggs and fledging chicks.
