= Samson Rock =

Glacial erratic boulder in Madison, Connecticut, US

Coordinates: 41°16′39.5″N 72°35′45.5″W

Samson or Sampson's Rock is a glacial erratic boulder in Madison in New Haven County, Connecticut.

According to Algonquin legend, the rock was formed by Odziozo, a giant and folk hero. The legend says Odziozo created it after he flung some land out to sea, creating Tuxis Island. The hole filled up to become Tuxis Pond. One rock fell from his hand and became Samson Rock. While leaving, he stepped on the rock. The rock contains a somewhat foot-shaped indent on top which the Algonquin pointed to in order to support this tale.

The European settlers assigned this legend to the Biblical Samson after being told the legend in the 1600s, giving the rock its name. Samson Rock has been preserved for its legendary significance, but is somewhat difficult to find, tucked between two shopping centers and a parking lot. The rock which it sits has been fit with a bronze plaque commemorating the legend of the rock, and a road has been named after it. The plaque was placed by the Madison Foundation, as well as the Madison Rotary Club and Stop and Shop. A bus stop also shares the name.

Sometime in late December, 2012, the plaque was vandalized. The vandal had crossed out Samson and replaced it with a heavily charged term. It has since been returned to its normal condition.

The rock that Samson Rock sits on is not a glacial deposit.

== See also ==
- Tuxis Island
- Tuxis Pond
- Lake Champlain
- Odziozo
- Samson
- Rock Dunder
