= Madison Reef =

Coordinates: 41.252°N 72.603°W

Madison Reef is a series of submerged rock shoals about 1.65 miles (2.65 kilometers) long and one mile (1.6 kilometers) offshore of Madison in New Haven County, Connecticut. It is between four and seventeen feet (1.21 and 5.18 meters) deep, and separated by channels of deeper water. Charles Reef is to the south and west. A cable passes through the reef on the seafloor.

== See also ==
- Round Rock, Madison
- Tuxis Island
- Gull Rock, Madison
- Thimble Islands
- Charles Reef
- Outer Lands
