= Odziozo =

Odziozo, also called Oodzee-hozo, is a giant in Algonquin (specifically Abenaki) legend. His name means "He who Created Himself," or "Transformer." He is attributed with the creation of Lake Champlain, Tuxis Island and Pond, Rock Dunder, and Samson Rock, among other landforms, including mountains and rivers. The legend states that he grew his arms and head from his body, but his legs grew slowly. He passed the time by forming valleys, meadows, and hills. After carving out and flooding Champlain, then known as Bitawbágw, Petoubouque or Petonbowk, meaning 'lake in between,' he followed a flock of migrating geese south along a glacier. He arrived in Madison, Connecticut, where he took a handful of earth and flung it to sea. The piece that landed in Long Island Sound became Tuxis Island, and another piece that fell out of his hand became Samson Rock. The hole, Tuxis Pond, was filled in the resulting splash. Odziozo then turned, stepping on the rock (It is assumed his legs were grown in by then), and went back to Vermont to get to his home, Rock Dunder, where, exhausted, he turned himself into a stone, so as to be permanently with his favorite creation.

Odziozo is often said to have lived before animals evolved legs, and, as such, many of the landforms he created were caused by the dragging of his body by his long arms. Rock Dunder, in Shelburne, Vermont, is supposedly where his spirit and body are kept. The Madison section of the story is most likely a more recent legend.

Odziozo has a boat race named after him in Lake Champlain.

At least one expert thinks that the glacier mentioned in the legend was added in the 17th century.

== Name variants ==
Odziozo has several name variants, including Wo-ja-ho-sen, Odzihozo, Odzihózo, Bemee-geedzin-pobi-zeed, Odzeez, Odzihodo, and Ojihozo. He is often confused with Glooscap.

== See also ==
- Abenaki mythology
- Glooscap
- Lake Champlain
- Rock Dunder
- Samson Rock
- Tabaldak
- Tuxis Island
- Tuxis Pond
