= Montrose Point Bird Sanctuary =

Nature preserve in Chicago, Illinois, US

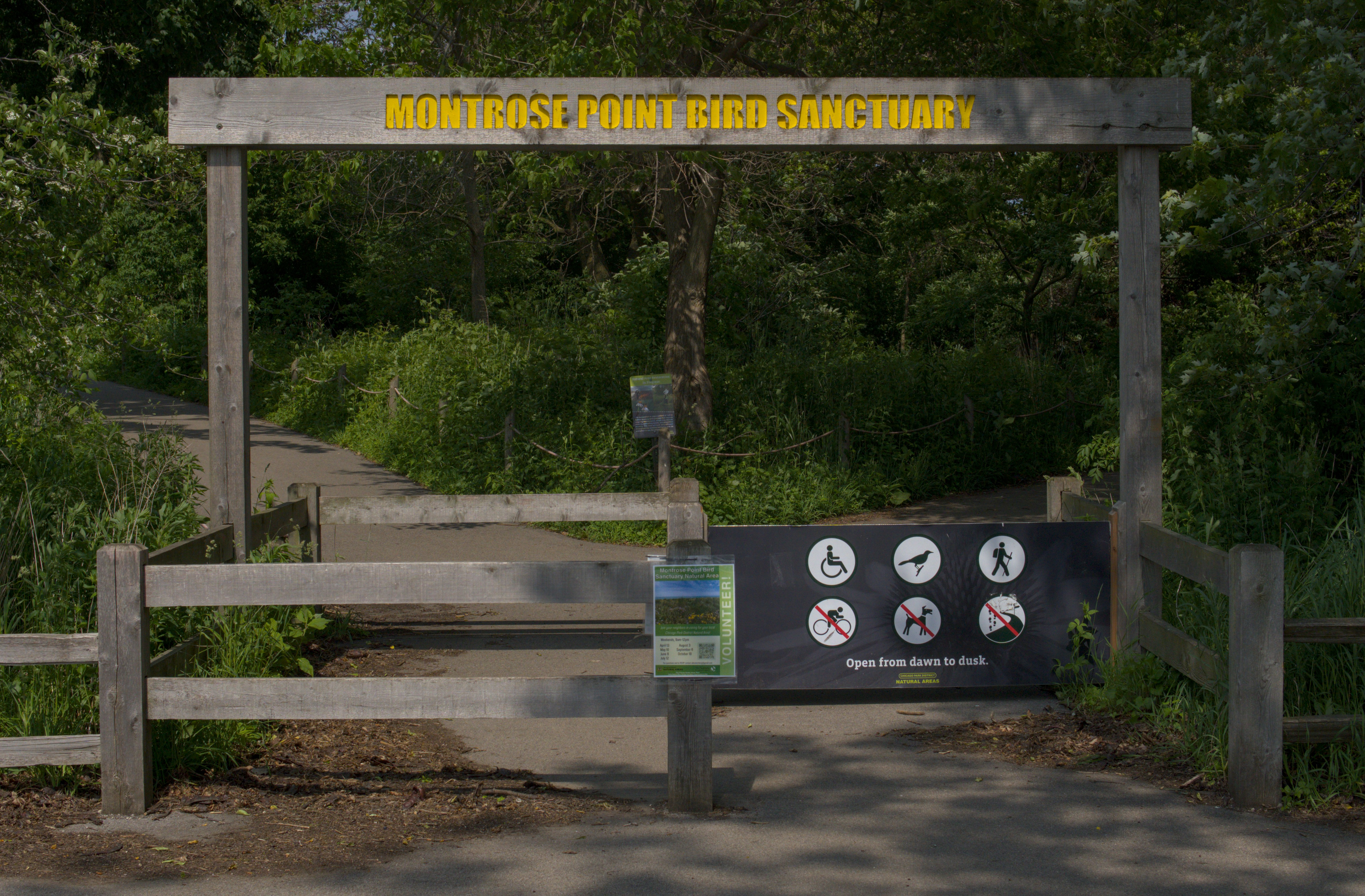
- Entrance to the Montrose Point Bird Sanctuary in 2025
- Interactive map of Montrose Point Bird Sanctuary
- Type: Animal sanctuary, nature preserve
- Location: 200 W. Montrose Harbor Dr. Chicago, IL 60660
- Website: www.chicagoparkdistrict.com/parks-facilities/lincoln-park-montrose-point-bird-sanctuary

Montrose Point Bird Sanctuary is a 15-acre bird sanctuary and nature preserve in Lincoln Park within Uptown, Chicago. The preserve includes Prairie, Savanna, Woodland, as well as an ADA Path, Birding Area, and Nature Trail. With 349 recorded species, it is Illinois's hottest spot on eBird.

Throughout the 1980s and 1990s, conservationists and birders worked together to officially designate this area a nature preserve and bird sanctuary. It opened to the public in July 2001.

== Birding ==
Montrose Point Bird Sanctuary is often visited during spring and fall migration. Passerines, as well as many other birds, often use the sanctuary as a stopover during their biannual migration. During peak birding season, there are often reports of the central meadow holding large numbers of sparrows, notably LeConte's, white-crowned, Lincoln's and fox.

In winter, the sanctuary is reported to have roosting owls, including northern saw-whet and snowy owl.

=== Monty and Rose ===
In 2019, two piping plovers nested at Montrose Beach, becoming the first nesting Piping Plover pair in the city since 1948. They were named Monty and Rose after their nesting spot.

== History ==
Montrose Point was man-made in the 1930s during the Montrose Harbor Extension. Alfred Caldwell developed plans for the planting of various flora on the Point, but these plans were never implemented.

During the Cold War, Montrose Point was a Nike missile site, site C-03, for the United States Army from Oct 1955 – June 1965. Honeysuckle bushes were planted to obscure their base. After the army left, local birders noticed that the honeysuckle, nicknamed "the Magic Hedge," was attracting several birds, including the Chestnut-sided Warbler.

Historically, Montrose Point Bird Sanctuary was a community space for gay men in Chicago. Many men in these spaces were arrested for public indecency and anti-sodomy laws. In 2016, filmmaker Frederic Moffet produced a short art documentary about the sanctuary's history in relation to Chicago's gay cruising scene.

Chicago mayor Richard M. Daley signed an Urban Conservation Treaty with the United States Fish and Wildlife Service that promised to provide bird-friendly areas. Chicago then invested $400,000 into native plants for the Montrose Point Bird Sanctuary, which opened in July 2001.

Some birders were upset when Montrose Beach opened dog beaches in fall 2002, expressing concern that the dogs would scare away the birds. In 2015, the Chicago Park District produced a future renovation master plan to guide development and renovation of the area. In accordance with the plan, the sanctuary added a butterfly meadow at the west end of the site. In 2021, an ADA-accessible trail was added to the site. Relatedly, an accessible 1/3 mile long loop was added, partially funded by a grant from the Illinois Department of Natural Resources.
