= Rock Dunder =

Rock in Lake Champlain

Coordinates: 44°26′49.27″N 73°15′34.99″W

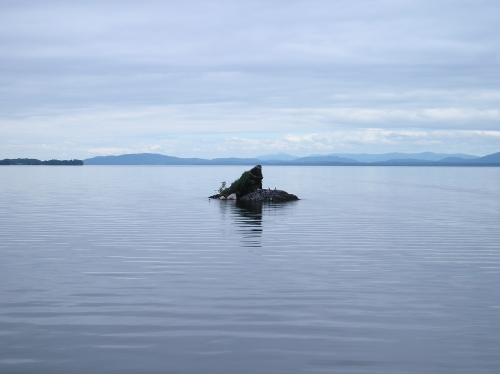
Rock Dunder, shown with a seagull standing on the left slope for scale

Rock Dunder is a tiny rock island extending just above the waters of Lake Champlain roughly 2.8 miles (4.5 km) southwest from the Burlington, Vermont ferry dock. The water level averages 95.5 feet (29.1 m) above sea level, and the rock protrudes only a few feet above that. The island becomes somewhat larger at low water.

Rock Dunder and much larger nearby Juniper Island (visible in the background of the picture) are remnants of a large belt of Utica slate which once filled Lake Champlain from Shelburne to South Hero, part of a belt extending northward from the Hudson River. The base of the rock is strewn with large boulders of Winooski limestone and Laurentian gneiss.

According to Abenaki legend, Oodzee-hozo ("he who created himself") lived before the invention of legs. As he dragged his body around, he created mountains, valleys and rivers, as well as Lake Champlain, which is holy to the Abenaki. Oodzee-hozo turned himself into this rock in the lake, and there his spirit lives.

An 1896 newspaper article says the Wendat (Huron) and Haudenosaunee (Iroquois) would meet here at what they called Wujahose to make their treaties. While there is similarity between this name and the Abenakis', the question arises as to whether the Haudenosaunee and Wendat knew of or cared about the Abenaki legend and whether they would have been meeting here if they believed it was the embodiment of such a powerful spirit.

The rock has often been mistaken for another ship on the foggy lake, and legend has it parts of the rock were blasted away throughout the Revolutionary war. Rock Dunder owes its name to one such incident. At the height of the Battle of Plattsburgh the patriots put a lantern on the rock which was shrouded in fog, to make it look like one of their ships. It worked, causing a British vessel to mistakenly fire on it multiple times. When the officer discovered his mistake he is said to have cried out "It's a rock, by Dunder!", earning the place its name.

== See also ==
- Tuxis Island
- Samson Rock
- Lake Champlain
- Tuxis Pond
- Odziozo
- Carleton's Prize
