= Tuxis Island =

Island in Connecticut, United States

Coordinates: 41°15′59″N 72°36′07″W

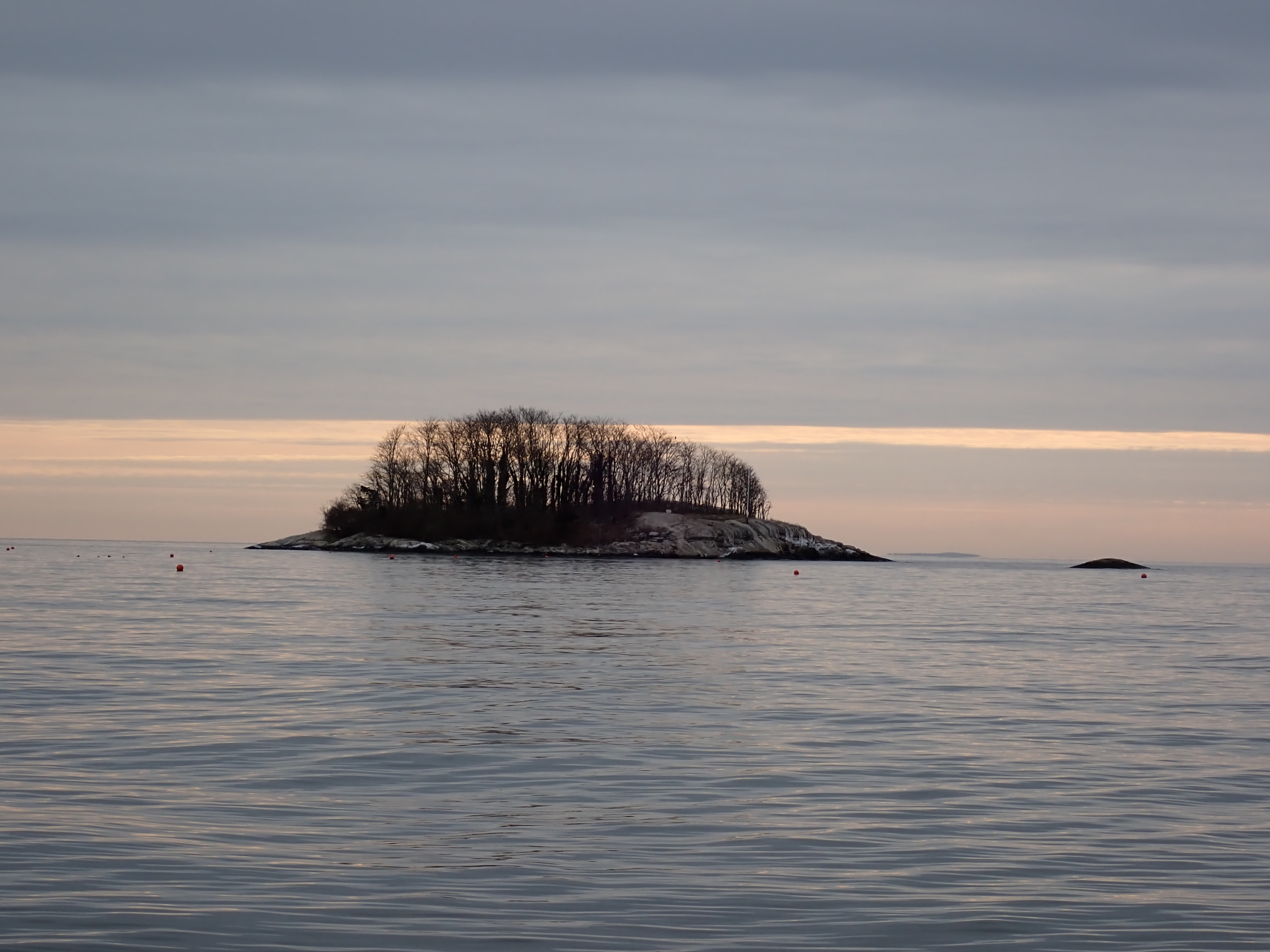

Geography
- Location: Long Island Sound

Administration
- United States
- State: Connecticut

Tuxis Island, sometimes uncommonly spelled Tunxis, is a small, uninhabited island about 1,029 feet (314 m) off the shore of Madison in New Haven County, Connecticut in the United States. Tuxis Island is about 3.42 acres (1.38 ha) in area, and covered mostly in trees. The island's elevation is 16 feet (4.9 m) above sea level. Tuxis Island was formed by glaciers, a fact that is evident by the many glacial potholes and small boulders on the south of the island. The island itself is made mostly of granite, like most of the other islands nearby, although there is some sand. Two other islands, Gull Rock and Round Rock, are relatively close to Tuxis, as is Madison Reef to the south, and several unnamed rocks and islets. These landforms are sometimes associated with the Thimble Islands.

The name Tuxis comes from the Native words Tuxisshoag and Tuckshishoag.

Tuxis Island is closed to people without permission from May to August to protect the many species of birds that nest there.

Tuxis Road in Madison Connecticut was also named after the island.

== History ==
The first people on Tuxis Island were the Hammonasset people. Tuxis Island has had various owners dating back to 1674. The current owners are the Madison Beach Club and a private shellfishing company. The New Haven YMCA ran a camp named Camp Jewell on the island for nine years, from 1901 to 1910.

In 1914, a congressman by the name of Thomas L. Reilly requested a breakwater to be built from the west tip of Tuxis Island to Round Rock, and northwest towards the Madison Wharf.

== Flora and fauna ==
Most of the animals seen on Tuxis Island are birds. There are about fifteen species of birds that nest on Tuxis, including geese, egrets, herons, seagulls, ospreys, and oystercatchers. Some smaller mammals, amphibians, and reptiles can be found here as well. The waters surrounding the island are home to several species of fish. Shellfish and other invertebrates can be found living on and around Tuxis Island.

The forest on Tuxis Island is mainly deciduous, with the occasional evergreen tree. Grasses, ferns, mosses, lichens, and some small shrubs are among the plants that constitute the undergrowth. Many algae cling to the rocks offshore. Fungi can be found here as well, due to the seaspray and tree cover creating a cool, damp environment.

== Folklore ==
According to the Algonquin, a giant named Odziozo formed Tuxis Island when he scooped up a handful of rocks from the mainland and flung it into the Sound. The resulting splash filled up the hole, creating Tuxis Pond. A rock that fell out of his hand became Samson Rock, which he stepped on when turning to go back home, resulting in a large footprint-shaped indent in the rock.

Later, colonists from Europe assigned the same legend to Samson (thus the name of the rock), from the Bible.

== See also ==
- Tuxis Pond
- Gull Rock, Madison
- Round Rock, Madison
- Madison Reef
- Lake Champlain, another lake claimed to have been made by Odziozo.
- Thimble Islands
- Samson Rock
- Rock Dunder
- Charles Reef
- Odziozo
- Outer Lands
