= Round Rock, Madison =

Glacial rock islet in Connecticut, US

Coordinates: 41°16′00.1″N 72°36′13.6″W

Round Rock is a glacial rock islet of around 119 square feet (11.1 square meters) in size. It is situated 1,163 feet (354 meters) offshore of Madison in New Haven County, Connecticut. In 1914, congressman Thomas L. Reilly requested Round Rock to be connected to Tuxis Island by a breakwater, and extended towards Madison Wharf. It is rarely grouped into the Thimble Islands archipelago. The islet is often represented without a name on maps, and often appears as little more than a small circle, as it is too small to consistently label. Smaller scale maps do, however include the name.

== See also ==
- Tuxis Island
- Gull Rock, Madison
- Madison Reef
- Thimble Islands
- Outer Lands
