= Gull Rock, Madison =

Rock ledge in Connecticut, United States

Coordinates: 41°16′02.5″N 72°35′54.2″W

Gull Rock is a small rock ledge 542 feet (165 meters) off the coast of Madison in New Haven County, Connecticut. It is 883 square feet (82.0 square meters) in size and made of glacial granite. It was named due to the large numbers of seabirds that rest there. Some parts of Gull Rock are covered in hardy plants during the summer months, and invertebrates thrive here. The island and its neighbors are occasionally considered to be part of the Thimble Islands, though this is uncommon. A steel seawall, now decrepit and unused, runs submerged from Gull Rock to the shore.

== See also ==
- Round Rock, Madison
- Tuxis Island
- Madison Reef
- Thimble Islands
- Outer Lands
