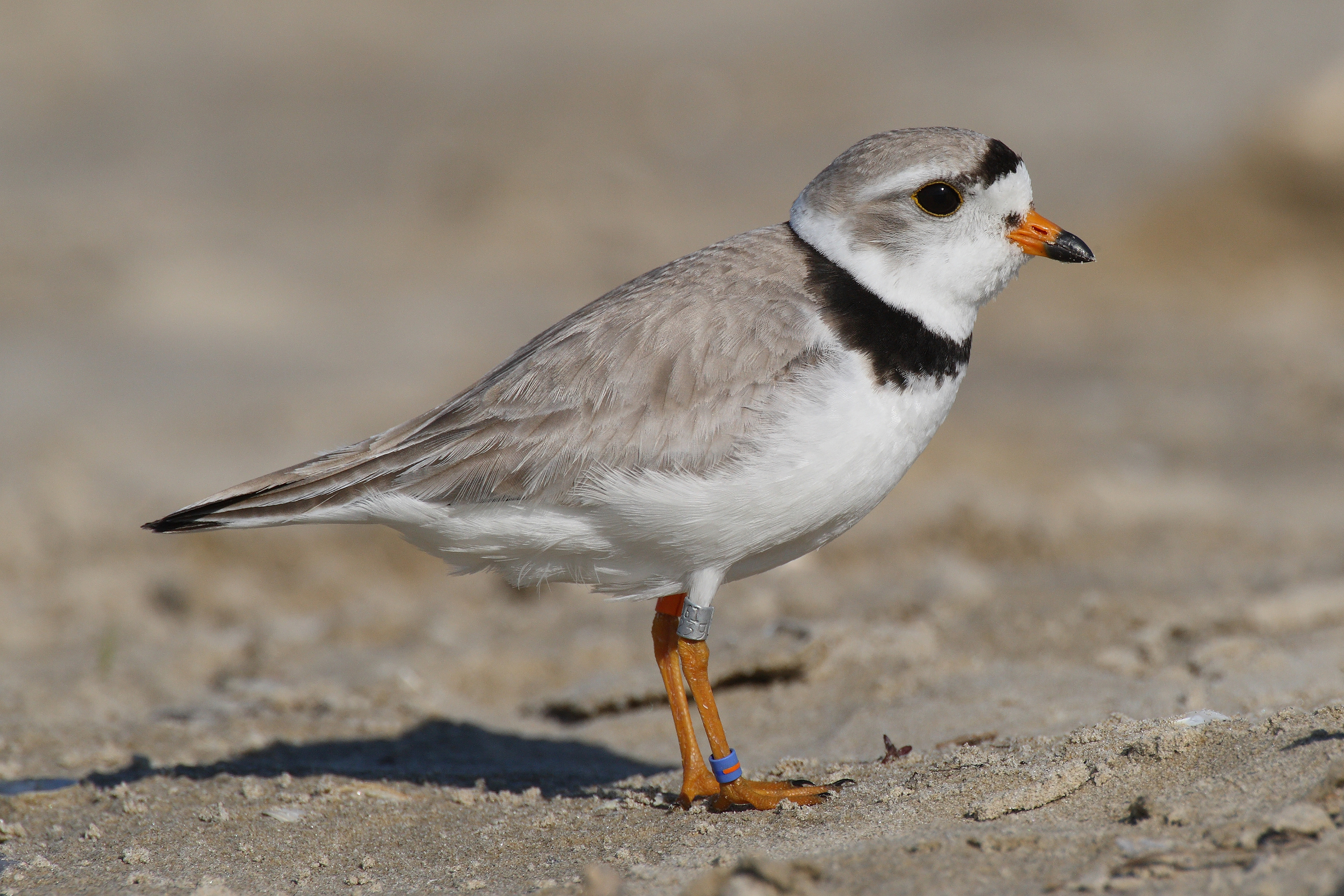
- Sauble Beach, Ontario, Canada

Conservation status
- Near Threatened (IUCN 3.1)

- Vulnerable (NatureServe)

Scientific classification
- Kingdom: Animalia
- Phylum: Chordata
- Class: Aves
- Order: Charadriiformes
- Family: Charadriidae
- Genus: Charadrius
- Species: C. melodus

Binomial name
- Charadrius melodus Ord, 1824

Subspecies
- C. m. circumcinctus; C. m. melodus
- Distribution Breeding Nonbreeding Passage

= Piping plover =

Species of bird

The piping plover (Charadrius melodus) is a small, sand-colored shorebird that nests and feeds along coastal sand and gravel beaches in North America. The adult has yellow-orange-red legs, a black band across the forehead from eye to eye, and a black stripe running along the breast line. This chest band is usually thicker in males during the breeding season, and it is the only reliable way to tell the sexes apart. The bird is difficult to see when it is standing still, as it blends well with open, sandy beach habitats. It typically runs in short, quick spurts and then stops.

There are two subspecies of piping plovers: the eastern population is known as Charadrius melodus melodus and the mid-west population is known as C. m. circumcinctus. The bird's name is derived from its plaintive bell-like whistles which are often heard before the bird is visible.

In 1986, the U.S. Fish & Wildlife Service listed the Great Lakes population as endangered and the Northern Great Plains and Atlantic populations as threatened. Intensive conservation efforts have yielded slow population growth, but only some populations have met the recovery goals set for them. The growth trend is expected to reverse if conservation efforts were stopped. Total population was estimated to be between 7600 and 8400 individuals in 2020.

Their breeding habitat includes beaches and sand flats on the Atlantic coast, the shores of the Great Lakes, and in the mid-west of Canada and the United States. They nest on sandy or gravel beaches or shoals. These shorebirds forage for food on beaches, usually by sight, moving across the beaches in short bursts. Generally, piping plovers will forage for food around the high tide wrack zone and along the water's edge. They eat mainly insects, marine worms, and crustaceans.

== Taxonomy ==
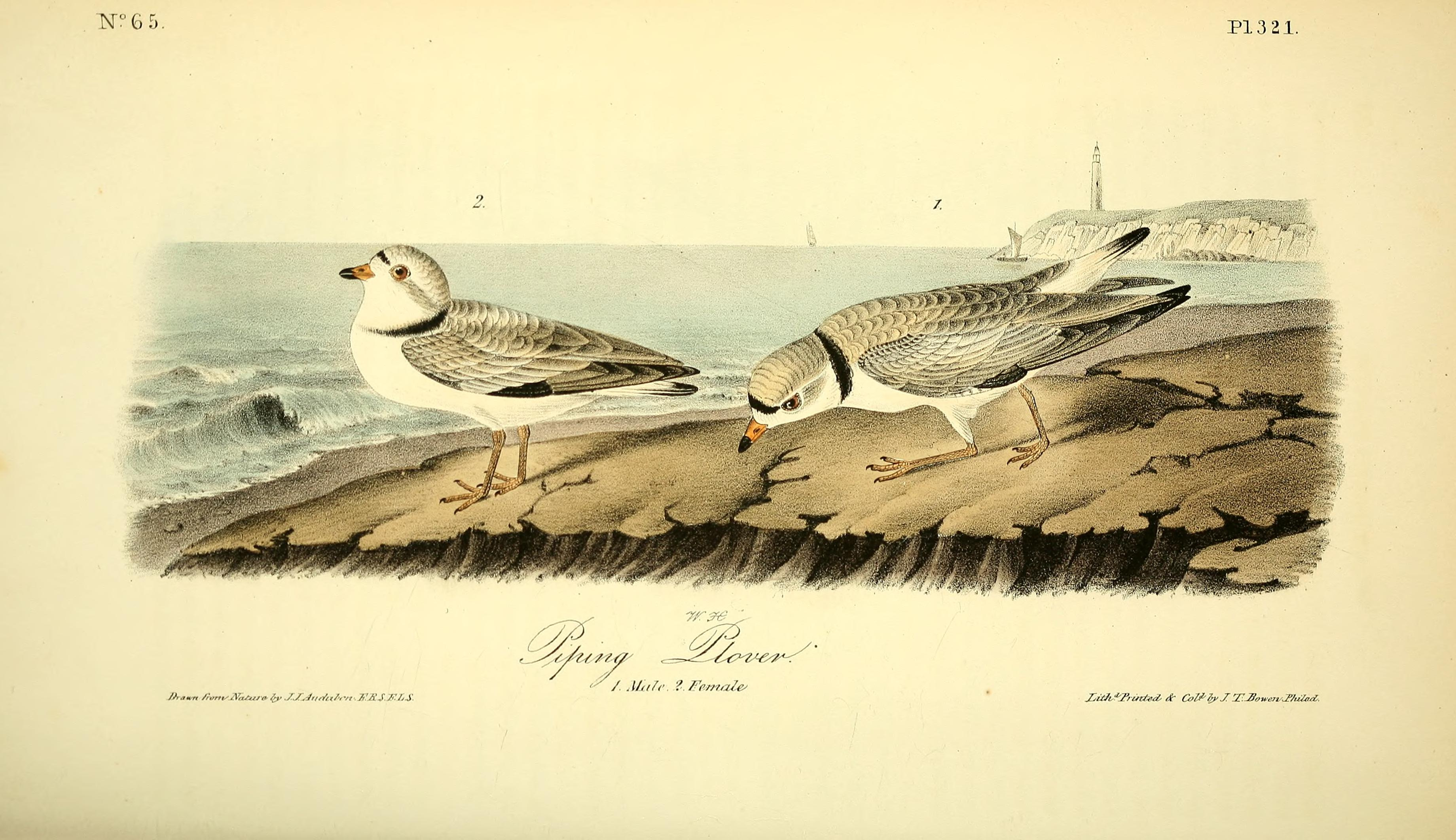
Illustration of male and female by John James Audubon.

The piping plover was given the binomial name Charadrius melodus in 1824 by the American ornithologist George Ord in a revised edition of Alexander Wilson's American Ornithology; or, The Natural History of the Birds of the United States. In 1812 Wilson had described and illustrated a bird collected from Great Egg Harbour, New Jersey.

Two subspecies are recognized: the nominate C. m. melodus of the Atlantic Coast and C. m. circumcinctus of the Great Plains. On average, circumcinctus is darker overall with more contrastingly dark cheeks and lores. Breeding circumcinctus males show more extensive black on forehead and bill-base and more often shows complete breast-bands. Some overlap exists.

== Description ==
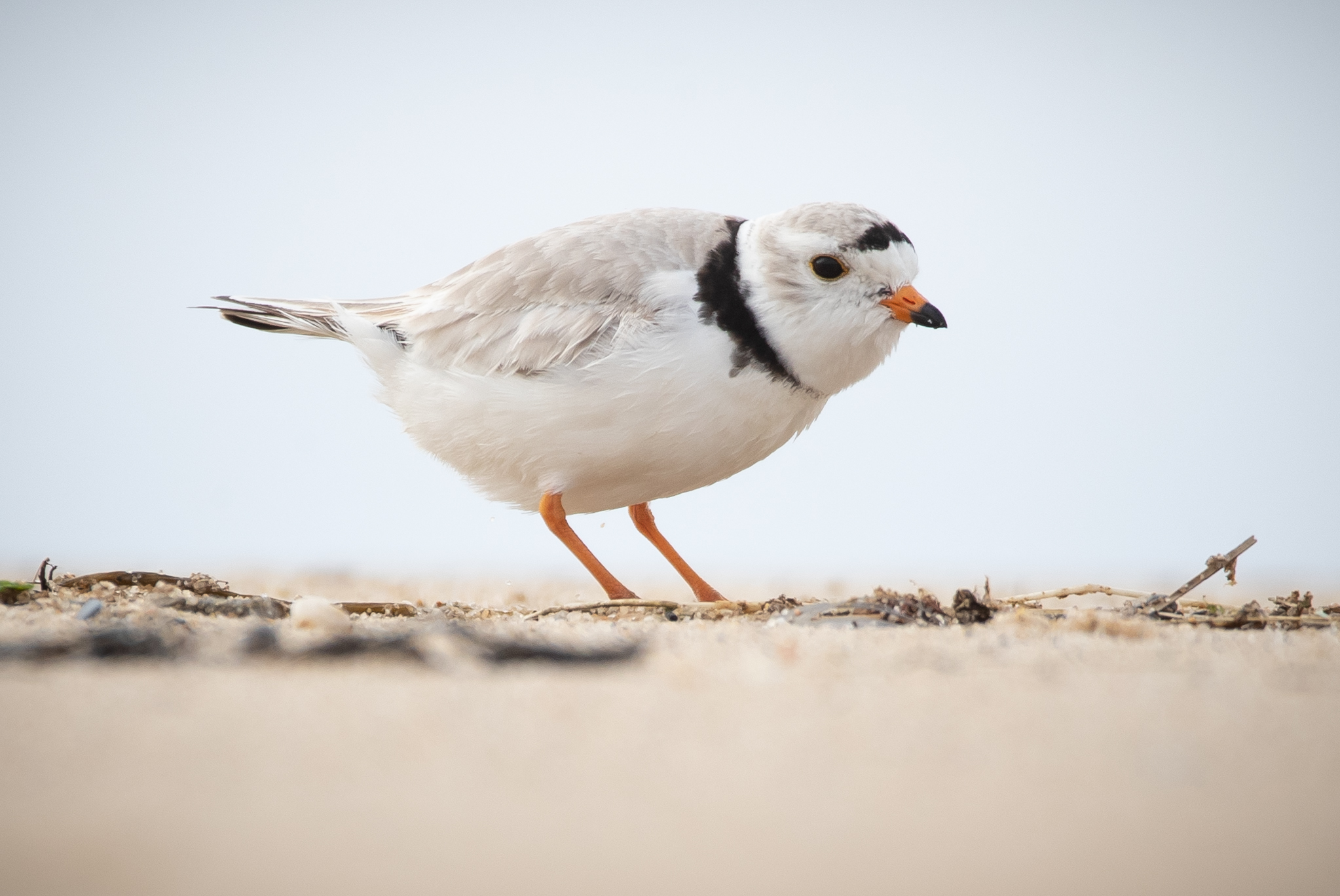
A piping plover on sand

The piping plover is a stout bird with a large rounded head, a short thick neck, and a stubby bill. It is a sand-colored, dull gray/khaki, sparrow-sized shorebird. The adult has yellow-orange legs, the male has a prominent black band across the forehead from eye to eye, and a black ring around the neck during the breeding season. The band on the female's brow is much fainter. During nonbreeding season, the black bands become less pronounced. Its bill is orange with a black tip. It ranges from 15–19 cm (5.9–7.5 in) in length, with a wingspan of 35–41 cm (14–16 in) and a mass of 42–64 g (1.5–2.3 oz).

Vocalizing

=== Vocalizations ===
The piping plover's light call is a soft, whistled peep peep given by standing and flying birds. Its frequently heard alarm call is a soft pee-werp, which the second syllable lower pitched.

== Distribution and habitat ==
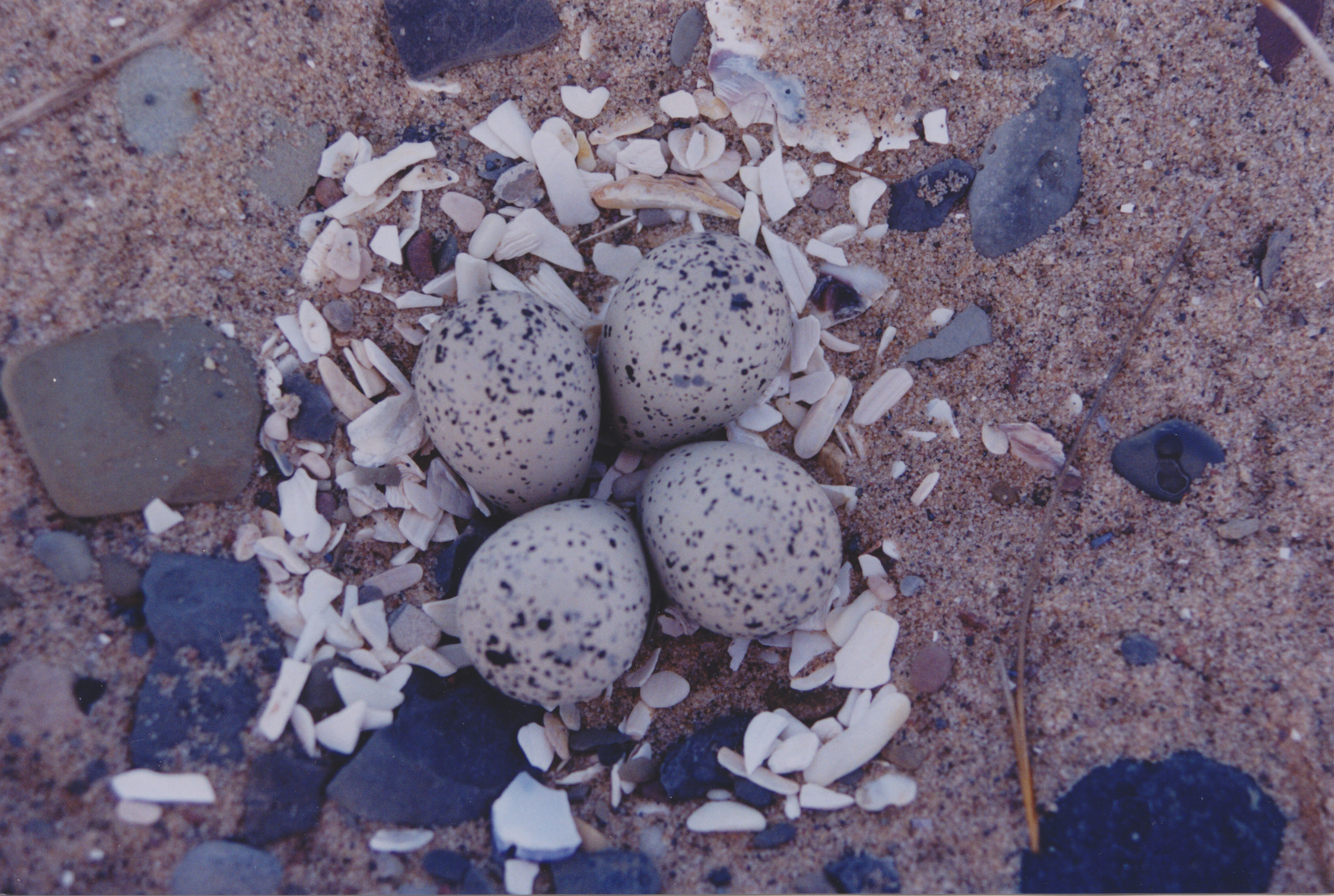
Nest on a beach of île de la Grande-Entrée, Magdalen Island, Quebec, Canada

The piping plover lives the majority of its life on open sandy beaches or rocky shores, often in high, dry sections away from water. They can be found on the Atlantic Coast of the U.S. and Canada on the ocean or bay beaches and on the Great Lakes shores. It builds its nests higher on the shore near beach grass and other objects. It is very rare to see a piping plover anywhere outside of sand or rocky beaches/shores while not migrating. Notably, they are considered a disturbance-dependent species due to their habitat's relationship with severe flooding. They need their nesting sites to be far away from the water to be dry for their entire nesting period – yet, they also need to nest in open sand. Often, this combination occurs only in sites which are thoroughly flooded once every few years, which brings in fresh sand and clears away vegetation. As human coastal management strategies worked to minimize unpredictable flooding, their old habitats often became overgrown, and their populations declined. Nowadays, the U.S. Army Corps of Engineers is forced to artificially clear shoals on the Platte and Missouri River to maintain some of the plovers' remaining habitat in the Great Plains. However, while these efforts are important, they remain inferior to natural periodically flooded habitats.

Alongside least terns, piping plovers also have an unusual relationship with mining. Whereas most species predictably suffer habitat loss from mining activities in their area, these birds are known to nest in waste sand piles generated by nearby mines, as the replacement for sand bars. Those sand piles remain topped-up and hostile to vegetation overgrowth as long as the mining activity continues. Often, mining sites end up reclaimed for housing development at the end of their lifespan, which means more construction work, and an extended persistence of waste sand piles. However, modern mining practices typically transport much of this waste sand to more remote areas, often to reuse it commercially, which limits colonization opportunities for these birds.

Piping plovers migrate from their northern range in the summer to the south in the winter months, migrating to the Gulf of Mexico, the southern Atlantic coast of the United States and the Caribbean, including The Bahamas. They have also been recorded across Cuba, with rarer occurrences elsewhere throughout the West Indies, and even Ecuador and Venezuela. They begin migrating north in mid-March. Their breeding grounds extend from southern Newfoundland south to the northern parts of South Carolina. Migration south begins in August for some adults and fledglings, and by mid-September most piping plovers have headed south for winter.

== Behavior ==
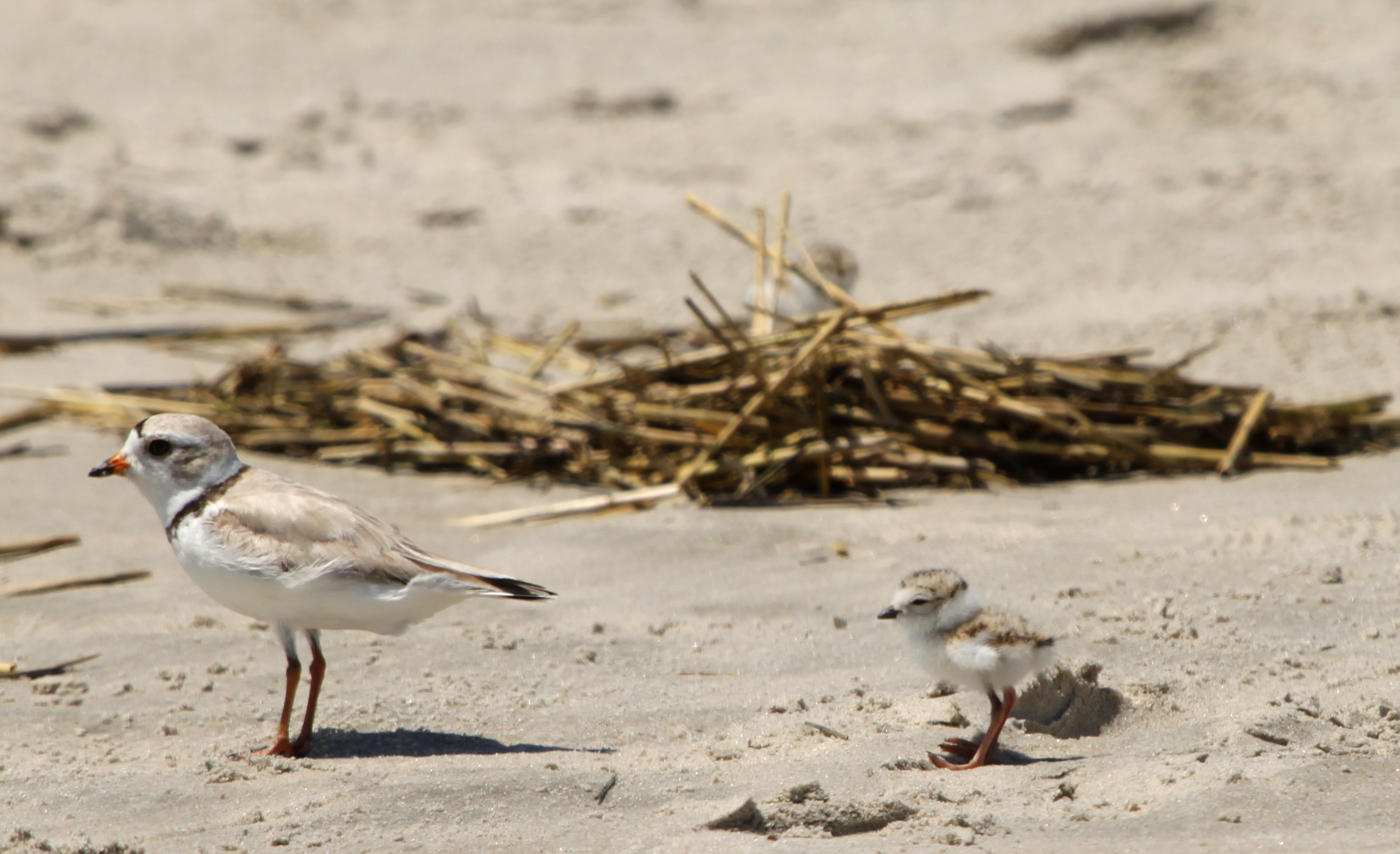
Parent and chick on the Atlantic coast, Cape May, New Jersey, USA

=== Breeding ===
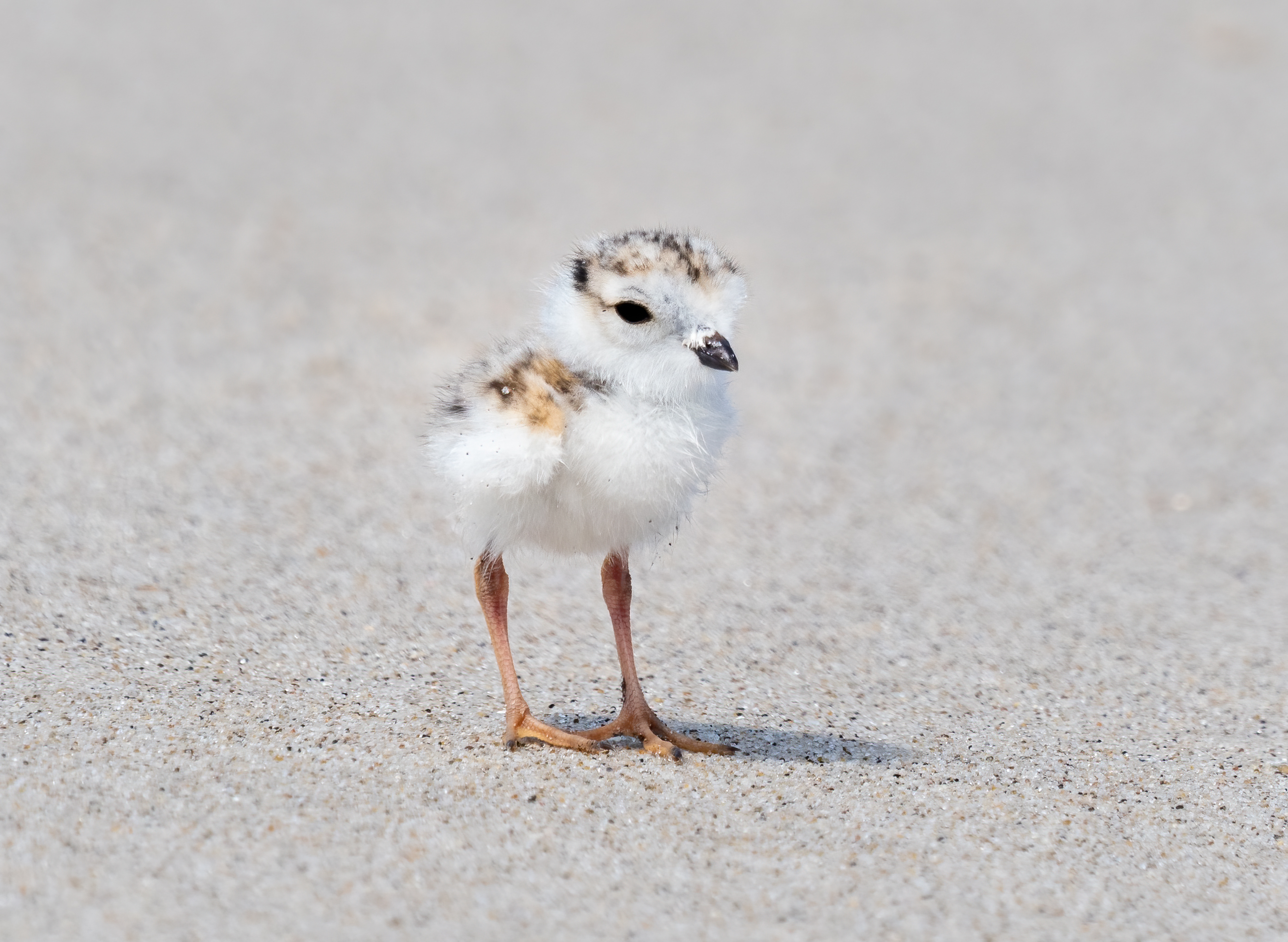
Piping plover chick on a beach in Queens, New York

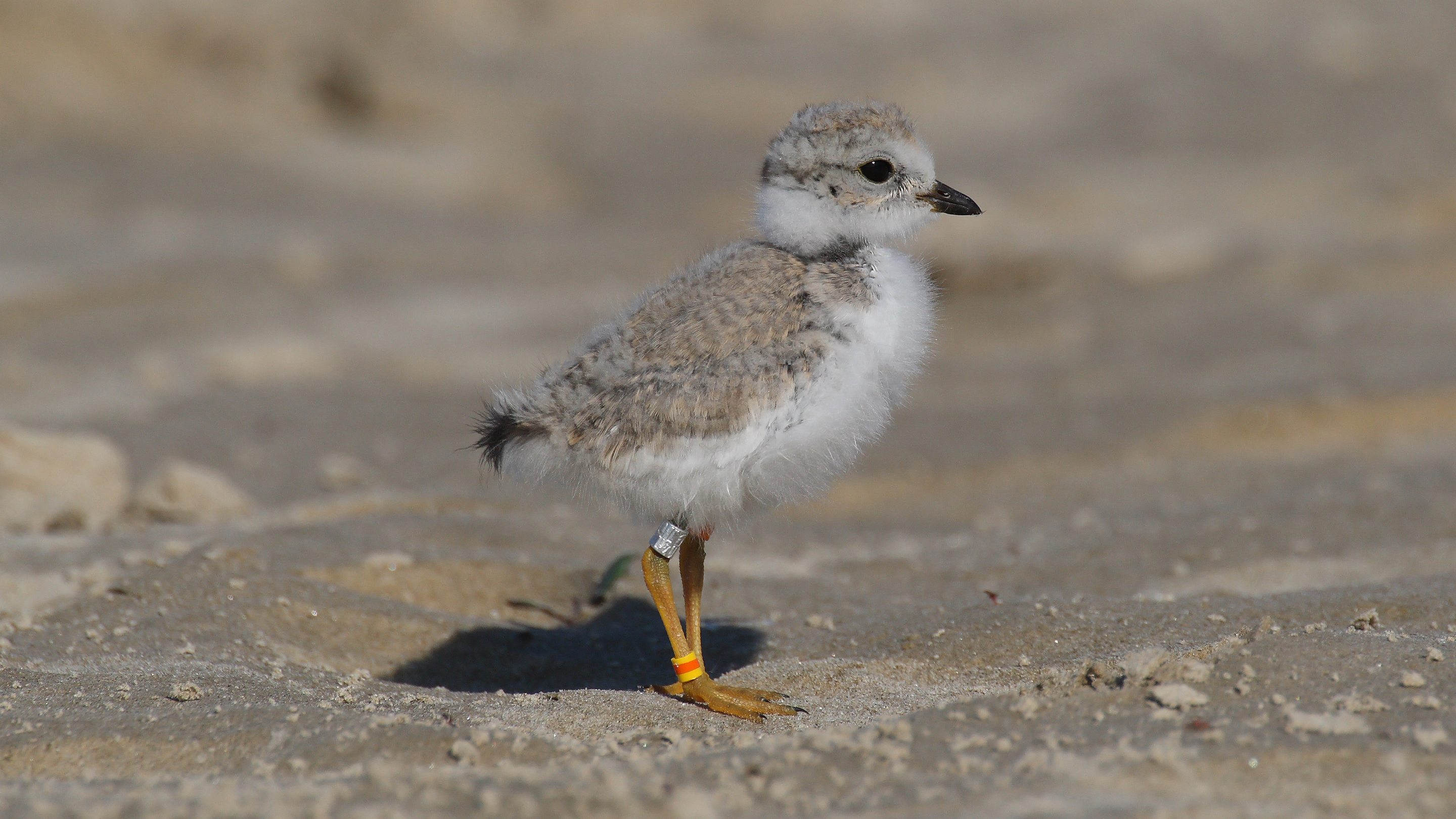
Piping plover chick with band at two weeks old.

The piping plover usually arrives at sandy beaches to breed in mid-March.

Males will begin claiming territories and pairing up in late March. When pairs are formed, the male begins digging out several scrapes (nests) along the high shore near the beach-grass line. The males also perform elaborate courtship ceremonies, including stone tossing and courtship flights featuring repeated dives. Scrapes, small depressions in the sand dug by kicking the sand, are often in the same area that least terns choose to colonize. Females will sit and evaluate the scrapes, then choose a good scrape and decorate the nest with shells and debris to camouflage it. Once a scrape is seen as sufficient, the female will allow the male to copulate with her. The male begins a mating ritual of standing upright and "marching" towards the female, puffing himself up and quickly stomping his legs. If the female had seen the scrape as adequate, she will allow the male to stand on her back and copulation occurs within a few minutes.

Most first-time nest attempts in each breeding season are four-egg nests which appear as early as mid-to-late April. Females lay one egg every other day. Second, third and sometimes fourth nesting attempts may have only three or two eggs. Incubation of the nest is shared by both the male and the female. Incubation is generally 27 days and eggs usually all hatch on the same day.

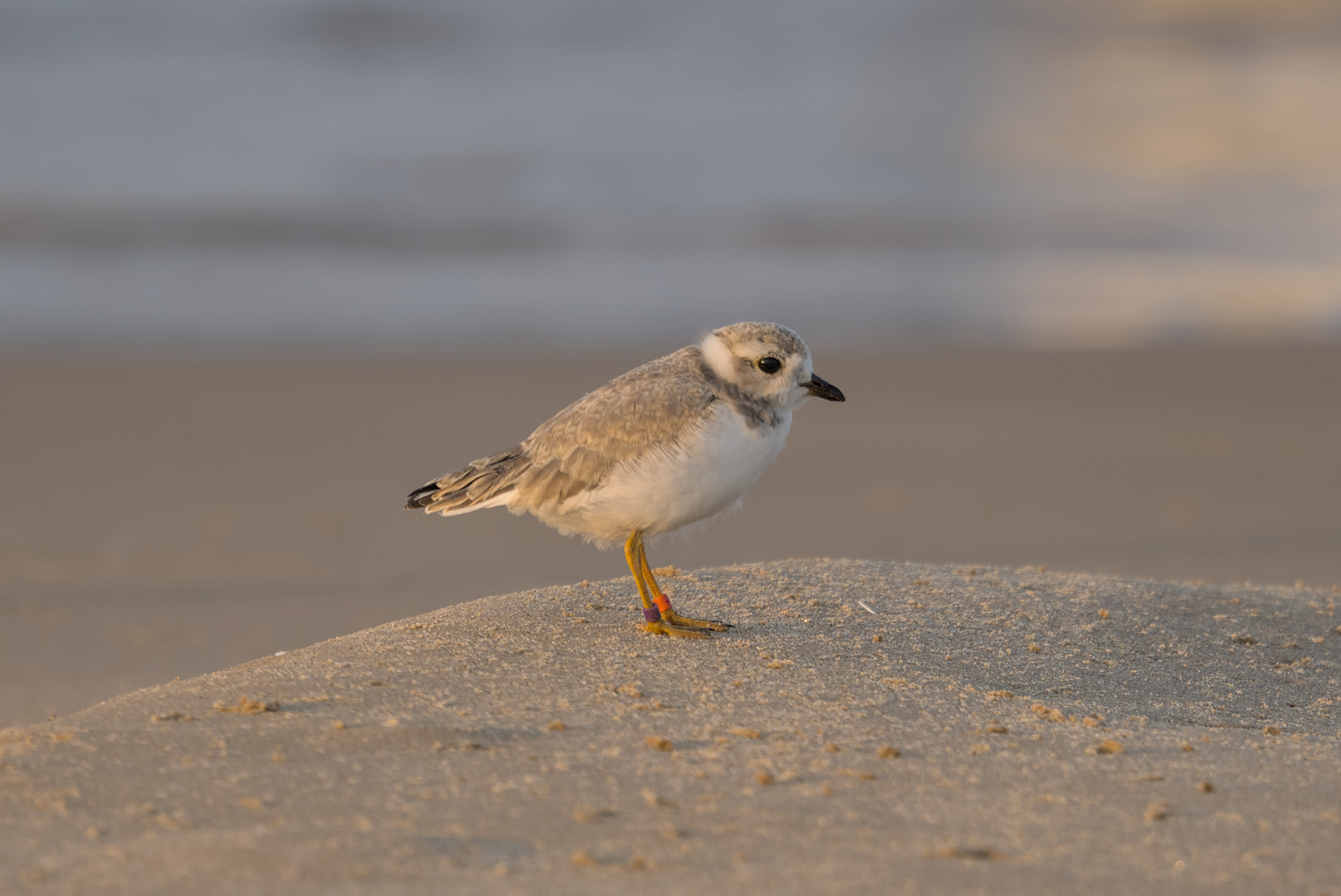
Piping plover fledgling with bands at Montrose Beach in Chicago, Illinois, USA

After chicks hatch, they are able to walk within hours, and must have access to feeding areas to feed on marine macro invertebrates. The adults' role is to protect them from the elements by brooding them. They also alert them to any danger. Like many other species of plovers, adult piping plovers will often feign a "broken wing display", drawing attention to themselves and away from the chicks when a predator may be threatening the chicks' safety. The broken wing display is also used during the nesting period to distract predators from the nest. A major defense mechanism of the chicks is their ability to blend in with the sand. It takes about 30 days before chicks achieve flight capability. They must be able to fly at least 50 yd (46 m) before they can be considered fledglings.

To protect the nests from predators during incubation, many conservationists use exclosures, such as round turkey-wire cages with screened tops. These allow the adults to move in and out but stop predators from getting to the eggs. After the chicks hatch, many areas will put up snow fencing to restrict driving and pets for the safety of the chicks. Threats to nests include crows, cats, raccoons, and foxes, among others. Exclosures are not always used, as they occasionally draw more attention to the nest than would occur without the exclosure. Natural hazards to eggs or chicks include storms, high winds, and abnormal high tides; human disturbances can cause the abandonment of nests and chicks as well. It is best to stay away from any bird that appears distressed to prevent any unintended consequences.

== Status and conservation ==
The piping plover is globally threatened and endangered; it is uncommon and local within its range, and has been listed by the United States as "endangered" in the Great Lakes region and "threatened" in the remainder of its range. While it is federally threatened, the piping plover has been listed as state endangered in Illinois, Indiana, Iowa, Maine, Michigan, Minnesota, Nebraska, New Hampshire, New York, New Jersey, Ohio, Pennsylvania, and Wisconsin. The Parker River Refuge on Plum Island, Massachusetts, is a national network of lands and rivers dedicated to the safety of its native wildlife and specifically the piping plover. Protecting the Piper with full beach closures, the Refuge now "has the second largest plover population on the [Massachusetts] North Shore".

In eastern Canada, the piping plover is found only on coastal beaches. In 1985, it was declared an endangered species by the Committee on the Status of Endangered Wildlife in Canada. A large population in Ontario has disappeared entirely. In 2008, however, piping plover nests were found at Wasaga Beach and near Sauble Beach, Ontario, along the Ontario Great Lakes shores. There is also some evidence of nesting at other sites in Ontario, including Port Elgin, Ontario in 2014.

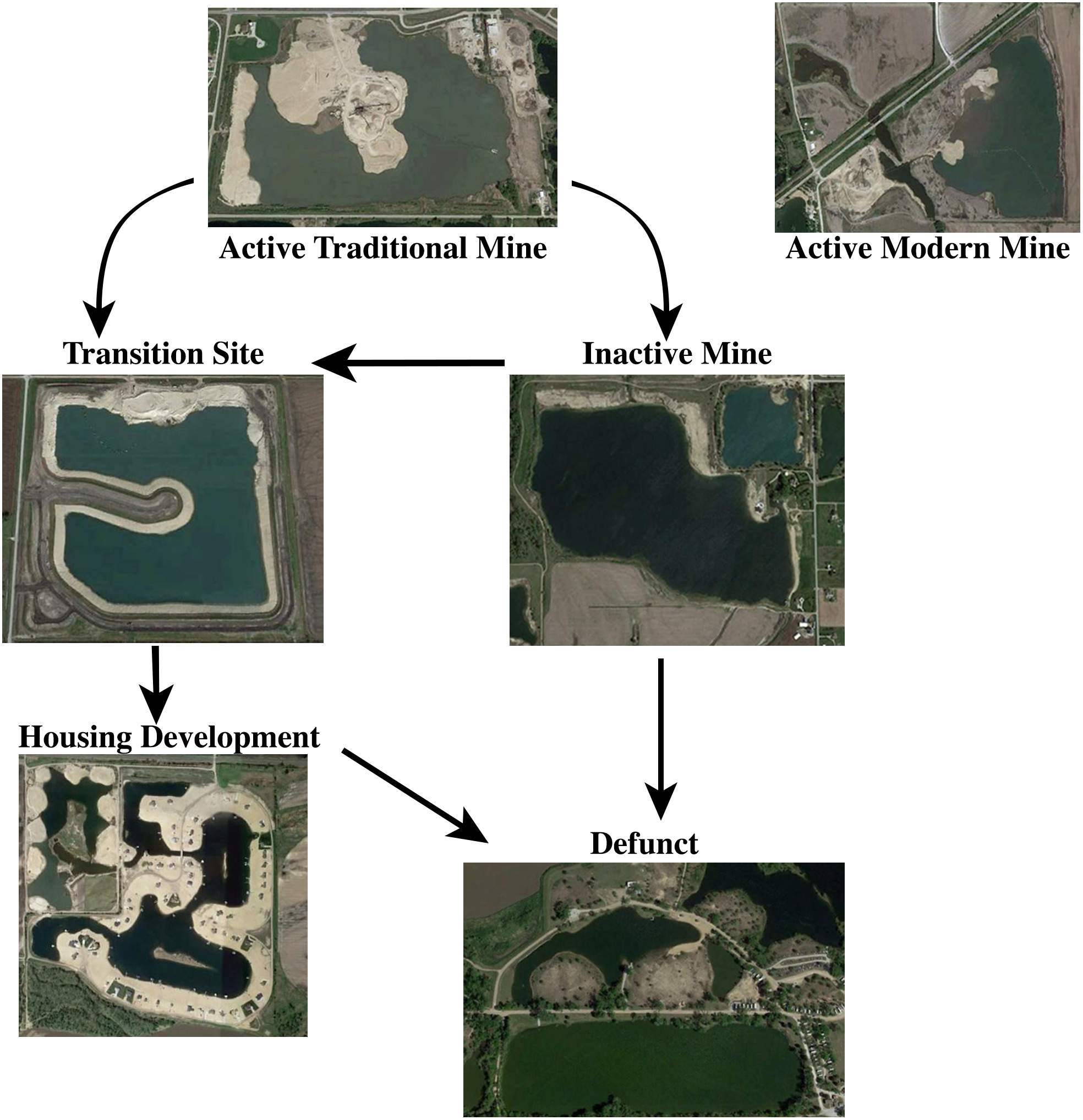
Aerial photos showing two general types of mining sites and the aftermath of mining operations. Piping plovers benefit from large white waste sand piles, which are the most abundant on traditional mining sites.

In the 19th century and early 20th century, the piping plover was used for its feathers, as were many other birds at the time, as decorations for women's hats. These decorations, called plumes, became a symbol of high society, especially those from larger rare birds. This practice led to its initial population decline. The Migratory Bird Treaty Act of 1918 helped the population recover through the 1930s. The second decline in the piping plover's population and range has been attributed to increased development, shoreline stabilization efforts, habitat loss and human activity near nesting sites in the decades following World War II. The Great Lakes populations eventually shrank to only around two dozen. On the Missouri River sandbars, the number of breeding individuals varied, with the population increasing from 2012 to 2017 following a major habitat creation event.

Critical nesting habitats are now being protected to help the population during its breeding season. Populations have seen significant increases since the protection programs began, but the species remains in serious danger. Some USGS research suggests that in the northern Great Plains, low connectivity between scattered habitats means that even maintaining the current population sizes will be a great challenge, and there's an 8–37% risk of those subpopulations disappearing near the end of the century. Current conservation strategies include identification and preservation of known nesting sites; public education; limiting or preventing pedestrian and/or off-road vehicle (ORV) traffic near nests and hatched chicks; limiting predation of free-ranging cats, dogs and other pets on breeding pairs, eggs and chicks; and removal of foxes, raccoons, skunks, and other predators.

In coastal areas, such as Plymouth, Cape Cod, Long Island, Fire Island National Seashore, Sandy Hook, Cape Henlopen State Park in Delaware, North Manitou Island in Lake Michigan, and most recently, Cape Hatteras National Seashore on the Outer Banks of North Carolina, beach access to pedestrians and off-road vehicles has been limited to protect piping plovers and their chicks at critical times of the breeding season.

Many studies have documented piping plovers' successes and struggles with human recreation or other predatory concerns. For example, piping plovers are much less likely to successfully fledge in heavily trafficked, popular recreational areas. Additionally, those that do fledge in active recreational areas tend to take longer to fledge. Most interestingly, chicks will spend less time foraging on weekends, since this tends to be when beaches are most active and disturbance will be at its highest. Despite the multitude of anthropogenic conservation concerns regarding the piping plover, a study on plovers on Long Island, New York found that the most significant cause of nest failure in the species was not humans, but depredation by the Red fox. Birds either lost their nests due to depredation of the nest, or significant predator presence and subsequent abandonment of the nest by adults. Birds rarely abandoned nests due to human presence.

Various environmental organizations are involved in aiding restoration efforts. The Goldenrod Foundation unsuccessfully filed suit against the Town of Plymouth in 2010 and 2015 to restrict offroad vehicle access to breeding habitat.

In 2019, the first documented pair of piping plovers in Chicago nested at Montrose Beach. The pair, named Monty and Rose by locals, hatched three chicks in July, becoming the first within Cook County in 60 years. Threats to the nest and chicks included a planned music festival that was canceled to ensure the birds were protected. Monty and Rose returned to the area in 2020 and 2021, again laying eggs and hatching chicks, although some eggs and chicks were lost to natural predators. In May 2022, the male shorebird, Monty, died after returning to Montrose Beach. Rose did not return in 2022. In late April 2023, Monty and Rose's offspring Imani was spotted at Montrose Beach along with an unbanded male and an unbanded female. In 2024, Imani returned to Montrose Beach again, this time joined by another banded male and a female named Searocket, who had been released at the beach as a captive-reared chick the previous summer; Imani and Searocket produced their first egg in late May.

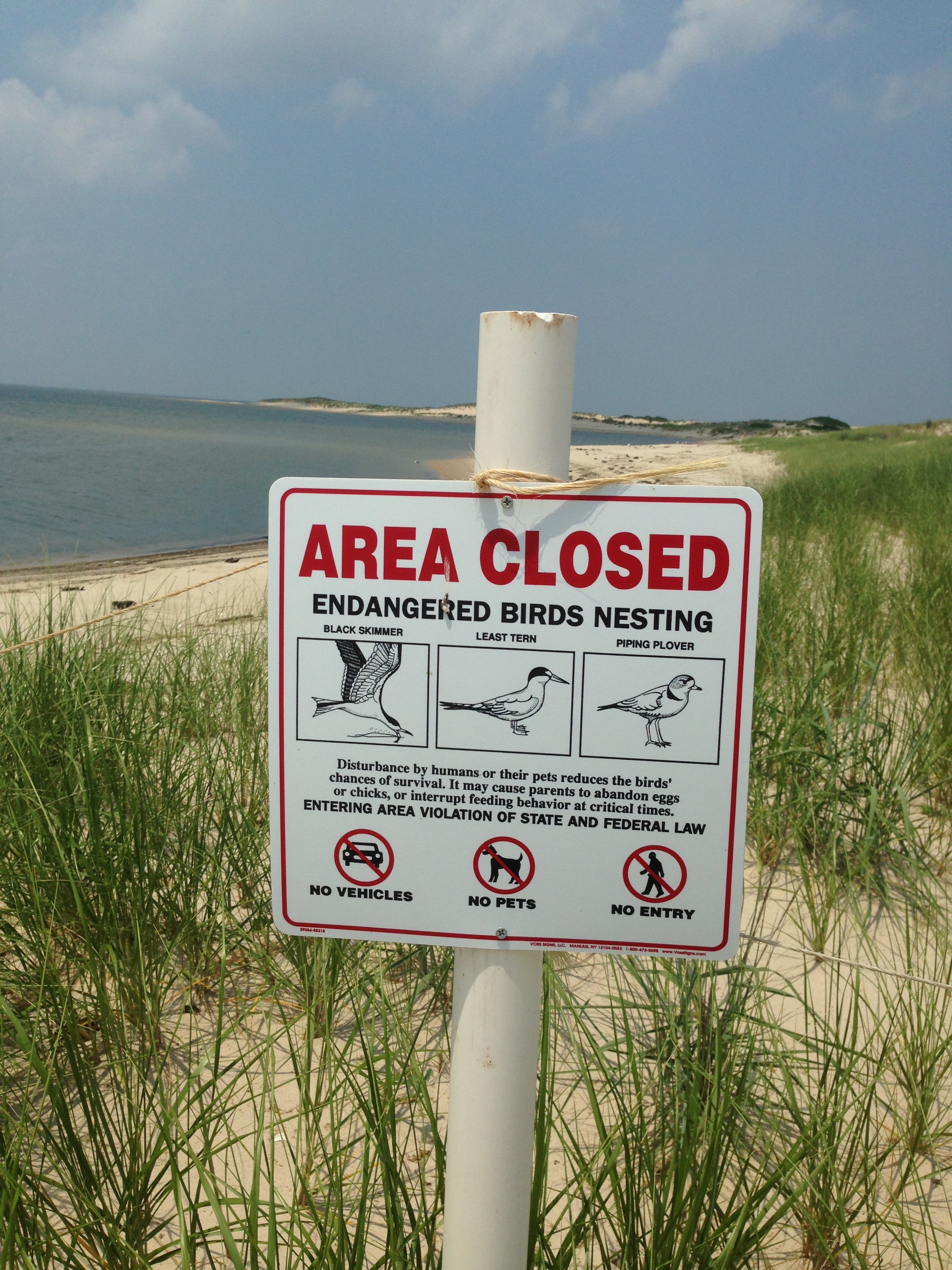
Area closed within Cape Henlopen State Park, Delaware, where piping plovers are known to nest

Piping plover protected nesting area on Cavendish Beach, P.E.I.

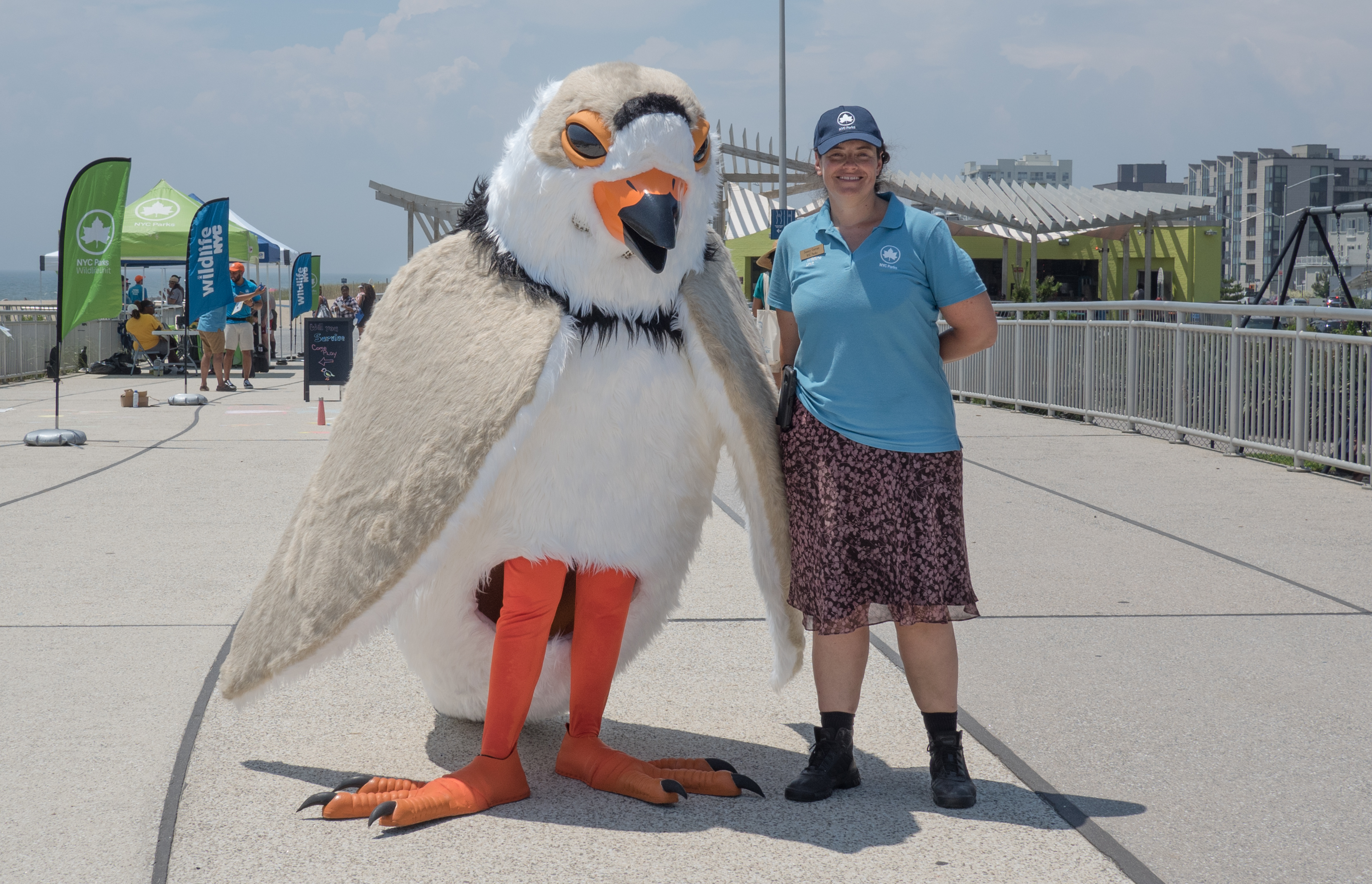
New York City Parks Department employee dressed in a piping plover costume for a "Plover Day" conservation event in 2019

== Climate change ==
As shorebirds, piping plovers may be highly impacted by climate change, as it affects their aquatic and their terrestrial habitats. At the same time, the disturbance-dependent nature of their habitat makes their relationship to climate change more complex than of most other bird species.

=== Increasing sand temperatures ===
Higher sand temperatures directly and negatively affect piping plovers. Piping plovers nest on the ground in open areas, which regularly subjects them to high temperatures. Because of these high temperatures, piping plovers (along with other ground-nesting bird species) have specific strategies and behaviors for thermal regulation of their nests and themselves. Research has been conducted to evaluate how sand temperature affects piping plover nesting behaviors in a population of piping plovers in North Dakota during the 2014-2015 breeding seasons. As sand temperatures increased, piping plover nest attendance decreased and the frequency and duration of daily shading behaviors increased. Rising ground temperatures will likely have significant effects on piping plovers' ground-nesting behavior.

=== Inland habitat water level rise ===
A main part of the piping plover's range is in the Prairie Pothole Region of South Dakota, North Dakota, and Canada. The shallow wetlands of this region fluctuate water surface area in response to wet-dry periods. Piping plovers who breed in this region depend on the decreased water levels to reveal shorelines that they use for nesting. Climate change, along with consolidation drainage, drainage of smaller wetlands into another wetland to create fewer, larger wetlands, has begun to create fuller wetlands, reducing shoreline nesting habitat. Research of 32 piping plover wetland habitats in this region found that wetlands with risen water levels had lower chances of piping plover presence. This suggests that the warming climate and increased water levels and precipitation will degrade piping plover breeding habitats in the Prairie Pothole Region.

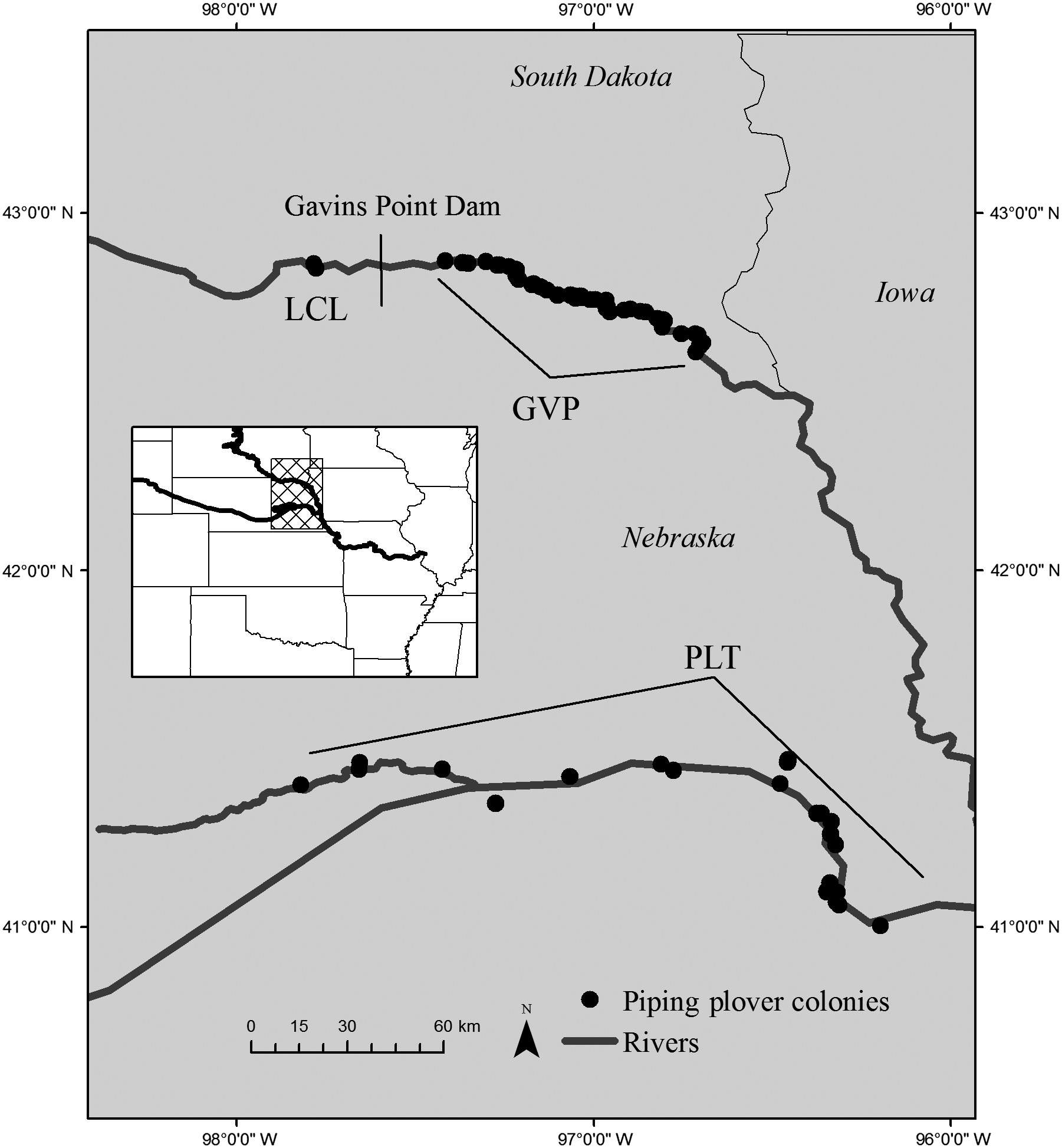
Piping plover habitat in Nebraska.

On the other hand, research suggests that piping plover's habitat in Nebraska, on the shoals of Platte and Missouri River and around Lewis and Clark Lake would benefit from climate change, as it would make extensive flooding (so called "high-flow events") which keeps the shoals from getting overgrown occur more often than it does now, yet closer to the historical, pre-European colonization of the Americas patterns. The ideal frequency of high-flow events for piping plover population abundance in this river system is once in four years. Shoreline stabilization efforts reduced such high-flow events to once per twenty years, which is not enough to maintain piping plover populations outside of artificially cleared shoals, which become their only refuge in the long term. Climate change would only be harmful to these populations overall if it either makes high-flow events occur more often than once every four years, or if it ends making the basin drier and ultimately reduces their frequency even further, and both are considered unlikely. However, it is more plausible that in at least the near term, climate change adaptation efforts to protect human property in the area would continue to suppress high-flow events and negate this benefit to piping plover populations, while also making them more vulnerable to a potential, unprecedented catastrophic flooding event which could overwhelm those efforts and also submerge piping plover subpopulations across the entire area.

=== Coastal habitat sea level rise ===
Climate change is also causing sea level rise, which may affect the piping plover's other main habitat, the Atlantic Coast of the U.S. and Canada. Research has assessed sea level rise's threat to the piping plover habitat on barrier islands in Long Island, New York, finding that sea level rise will reduce piping plover breeding areas. Breeding habitats have the potential to migrate inland, but would still be reduced as a result of human development, which would reduce the migrated habitat 5-12%. This may lead to conflict between piping plover habitat conservation and human recreation because sea level rise will make the habitats take up a larger proportion of the islands. Research also shows that a large hurricane with the risen sea levels could flood up to 95% of piping plover habitat, so increased coastal storms induced by climate change, combined with rising sea level, could be very damaging.

Similar research has been conducted on the Florida coastline, part of the piping plovers's Atlantic coast habitat, to evaluate the habitat's sensitivity to sea level rise caused by climate change. Florida coastline species are at particular risk to climate change because of not just sea level rise, but also increased tropical storms. The piping plover depends on this habitat because it migrates south from its breeding habitats to winter in Florida for about three months. It is predicted that there will be a 16% loss of coastal landforms from inundation by the year 2100. Further, the sea level rise may make the coastline more complex, which may produce more habitat fragmentation. Thus, the changing landforms of the Florida coastline will likely affect piping plover ecology. Research also shows that of the shorebird species affected by the Florida coastline transformation, piping plovers are at high risk of decline.

== In popular culture ==
In May 2023, the United States Postal Service released a piping plover Forever stamp as part of the Endangered Species set, based on a photograph from Joel Sartore's Photo Ark. The stamp was dedicated at a ceremony at the Jamaica Bay Wildlife Refuge, one of the biggest nesting sites for piping plovers.
