= List of fictional tricksters =

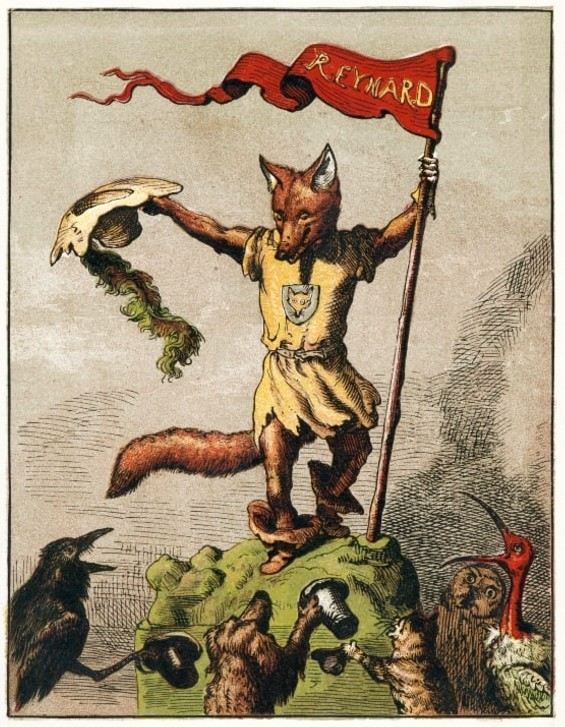
The trickster figure Reynard the Fox as depicted in an 1869 children's book by Michel Rodange.

The trickster is a common stock character in folklore and popular culture. A clever, mischievous person or creature, the trickster achieves goals through the use of trickery. A trickster may trick others simply for amusement or for survival in a dangerous world. The trickster could be a personification of the chaos that the world needs to function.

An archetypical example is the simple peasant successfully put to the test by a King who wishes a suitable suitor for his daughter. In this fairy tale, no brave and valiant prince or knight succeeds. Aided only by his natural wit, the peasant evades danger and triumphs over monsters and villains without fighting. Thus, the most unlikely candidate passes the trials and receives the prize. Such characters are a staple of animated cartoons, in particular those used and developed by Tex Avery et al. during the Golden Age of American animation.

== Characteristics ==
Hynes and Doty, in Mythical Trickster Figures (1997) state that every trickster has several of the following six traits:

1. fundamentally ambiguous and anomalous
2. deceiver and trick-player
3. shape-shifter or master of disguise
4. situation-inverter
5. messenger and imitator of the gods
6. sacred and lewd bricoleur

== Tricksters in folktale and mythology ==
- Àjàpá - The turtle trickster of Yoruba folk tales.
- Anansi - The spider trickster of African origin. He considers himself cunning enough to trick and outwit anyone, but is also proud, lazy, and impulsive, which often proves to be his undoing.
- Azeban - "the Raccoon," a trickster spirit in Abenaki mythology.
- Birbal, a real advisor to the Mughal emperor Akbar the Great, is often cast as a trickster in Indian folklore.
- Br'er Rabbit - A slave trickster of African American origin.
- Coyotes in various Native American mythologies.
- Curupira - A Brazilian folklore (male) jungle genie who protects the animals and the trees of the forests. It has red hair and backwards feet to confuse hunters and lumberjacks.
- Dionysus - Greek God of wine, madness, and ecstasy. More than any other Greek God, he is associated with shape-shifting and taking on other identities, which is part of why he is also associated with actors. A thoroughly ambiguous person in personality and in his androgynous figure, one can never know exactly what he will do next.
- Eris - Greek Goddess of discord in Greek mythology. Infamous for starting a fight between other goddesses over the Apple of Discord, leading to the Judgement of Paris and, ultimately, the Trojan War.
- Eshu/Eleggua/Legba - One of the primary orishas in Yorùbá religion, patron of roads and especially crossroads, doors, and travelers, as well as a spirit of chaos and trickery.
- The Fair Folk in many European cultures.
- Hermes - Messenger of the gods in Greek mythology and Mercury in Roman mythology, patron of travelers, boundaries, and thieves. Notably stole a herd of cattle from Apollo in his youth, but then invented the lyre and gave it to Apollo as payment.
- Hershele Ostropoler - In Ashkenazic Jewish folklore, based on a real person who lived during the 18th century.
- Huehuecoyotl - the gender-changing coyote god of music, dance, mischief, and song of pre-Columbian Mexico and Aztec Mythology. Befitting a trickster, he is the patron of uninhibited sexuality and often engages in trickery against the gods with camaraderie among mortals.
- Jack - best known from the story Jack and the Beanstalk, he is a young boy who uses his wit to outsmart characters in many stories.
- Jack Mary Ann - A folk hero from the Wrexham area of north Wales whose fictionalised exploits continue to circulate in local folklore.
- Jacob - Biblical patriarch and the ancestor of the Israelites.
- John the Conqueror - Character who appears in many stories from the African American tradition. He is a slave who is much smarter than any slave-master and cannot be controlled.
- Kitsune - In Japanese folklore, they are described as "tricksters" with no care for the concept of right or wrong.
- Kuma Lisa - A fox and trickster figure in Bulgarian folklore.
- Loki - A cunning, shape-shifting god, sometimes benefactor and sometimes foe to the gods of Asgard. Famous as a catalyst for Ragnarök. The precise nature of Loki's being defies clear classification, as there is little detail regarding his mother, but he is at least half-giant on his father's side.
- Māui - A Polynesian culture hero famous for his exploits and his trickery.
- Maximón - A cunning deity in modern Mayan tradition. Famous for being a womanizer and using trickery to achieve his goals.
- Nasreddin - In Turkish folklore, based on a historical 13th century person.
- Odysseus - Hero and king in Greek mythology. Came up with the idea for the Trojan Horse, and used his wits to escape perilous situations during the Odyssey, e.g. outwitting Polyphemus the Cyclops.
- Pan - God of shepherds and flocks. He is a satyr, a creature with the upper body of a man and the legs of a goat. In many stories, Pan and satyrs in general are known to play tricks on people, especially children, for their amusement.
- Pedro Urdemales – a trickster folk hero from Iberian and Latin American folklore
- Prometheus - Tricks Zeus over sacrifices at Mecone, steals fire on behalf of mankind.
- Puck/Robin Goodfellow - A "merry domestic fairy" from British folklore. Prominently featured in Shakespeare's A Midsummer Night's Dream, where he plays tricks on a group of humans who stumble into a forest. His final monologue explains the nature of tricksters.
- Puss in Boots - A clever and magical cat who tricks a king into raising a lowborn miller to the station of a great noble, and defeats a shapeshifting ogre by tricking him into becoming a mouse.
- Raven amongst the Indigenous peoples of the Pacific Northwest Coast.
- Reynard - A red fox and trickster figure who plays a central role in the moralistic fables of the Reynard cycle.
- Saci - A Brazilian folklore character, a one-legged black or mulatto youngster with holes in the palms of his hands, who smokes a pipe and wears a magical red cap.
- Sang Kancil, the mouse-deer trickster of Malaysian and Indonesian folklore.
- Scheherazade, the heroine in the frame story of the One Thousand and One Nights. By her wit and guile, she delays her execution every night by the murderous Shah, until she cures him of his madness by winning his heart.
- Sisyphus - Sly and audacious mortal king in Greek mythology who managed to cheat death twice, but angered the gods in the process and was condemned to endlessly push a boulder up a slope in Tartarus.
- Sly Peter - In Bulgarian and Macedonian folklore.
- Stingy Jack - a folkloric character associated with Halloween. He outwits the Devil, but displeases God in the process. Because his soul is denied entry into Heaven and Hell, he is doomed to haunt the earth as a ghost, carrying a lantern - thus being the origin of the Jack-o'-Lantern.
- Sun Wukong - Irrepressible Monkey King of Chinese mythology, whose exploits are described in Journey to the West.
- Sri Thanonchai - In Thai and other Southeast Asian folklore. He is known as Xiang Miang or Sieng Mieng in Laos, Saga Duasa in Myanmar, and Ah Thonchuy Prach in Cambodia.
- Susanoo - Amaterasu's brother, god of storms and trickster of Japanese mythology. His destructive behaviour gets him banished from Heaven, though he later redeems himself through deeds of heroism.
- Trạng Quỳnh – A trickster in Vietnamese folklore based on a historical figure of the 17th and 18th centuries, whose deceitful targets are often high-class figures in society.
- Till Eulenspiegel – Trickster of German folklore.
- Tokoloshe – Trickster of Zulu mythology.
- Twm Siôn Cati - A Welsh trickster who was reputed to have lived in the 16th century: according to legend, he was a gentleman farmer by day, but a highwayman at night.
- Zomo, a rabbit from Nigerian folklore.

== Tricksters in fiction ==
=== Novels, short stories, and comics ===
- El-ahrairah - The Prince of Rabbits, or the "Prince with the Thousand Enemies"; the trickster folk hero of the rabbits in Watership Down.
- James Jesse/The Trickster - A supervillain from DC Comics and a foe of the Flash.
- The Joker - The chaotic counterpart to Batman's strive for order, he displays several characteristics of the trickster. Inscrutable, unpredictable and a defining obsession with gags and pranks that are sometimes harmless, sometimes deadly.
- Joseph Joestar - The main protagonist of JoJo's Bizarre Adventure: Battle Tendency and a major supporting character in Stardust Crusaders. Joseph has a supernatural talent of deception and sleight-of-hand, which, combined with his martial arts skills and ability to channel Hamon, makes him an unpredictable fighter. He will frequently taunt his opponents both for his own amusement and as a tactic to lower their confidence.
- Kickaha - The Trickster from Philip José Farmer's World of Tiers novel series. Also known by his true name, Paul Janus Finnegan.
- Loki (Marvel Comics) - From the Marvel Comics series and the Marvel movies Thor, The Avengers, Thor: The Dark World, Thor: Ragnarok, and Avengers: Infinity War. He is based directly on the trickster god Loki from Norse mythology.
- Max and Moritz - Principal characters of the book of the same name written by Wilhelm Busch in 1865. Famous for their tricks, Max and Moritz quickly became famous characters in Germany.
- The Mask - Wears a mask imbued with Loki's powers and lack of inhibition.
- Mister Mxyzptlk - An imp from the fifth dimension featured in the Superman comics.
- Ms. Gsptlsnz - The girlfriend of Mister Mxyzptlk from the fifth dimension in the Superman comics.
- Panurge - Companion of the Giant Pantagruel in the books of Francois Rabelais.
- Rumplestiltskin - A character from the Mother Goose Grimm fairy tales, in which he fits many of the attributes of the trickster and often tricks other characters for his own nefarious purposes.
- Silk - or Prince Kheldar of Drasnia, a character in The Belgariad and The Malloreon.
- Yun-Harla - The trickster goddess of the Yuuzhan Vong religion in the New Jedi Order series, who protagonist Jaina Solo impersonates in several novels.

=== Movies, television, animation, and video games ===
- The Trickster - an immortal extra-dimensional alien from the show Doctor Who.
- Bart Simpson - From the animated TV series The Simpsons.
- Bill Cipher - A demon resembling a one-eyed triangle, and the main antagonist of the animated series Gravity Falls. He has many supernatural abilities and loves to use them to cause trouble for humans, including offering deals that invariably turn out badly for those who take them.
- Bugs Bunny - A cartoon rabbit trickster, in some respects similar to Brer Rabbit.
- Catnip - a Siamese cat actress who often portrays villains in plays and is also a trickster outside of acting. She is a Sanrio character who appeared in Hello Kitty's Furry Tale Theater (1987).
- Cegorach - the trickster god and one of the few survivors from their pantheon of the Eldar in the Warhammer 40,000 setting.
- Clopin - King of the Gypsies and Master of Ceremonies at the Festival of Fools, from the Disney film The Hunchback of Notre Dame. He is a brightly-clothed jester who can be devious and unpredictable.
- Discord - a former antagonist from My Little Pony: Friendship is Magic. He is the powerful Spirit of Chaos and Disharmony, and, though later reformed, still sometimes play tricks on others.
- The Doctor - The title character of Doctor Who: Always a situation-inverter, deceiver and bricoleur, and sometimes ambiguous or trick-player, depending on the incarnations.
- Doctor Facilier - Also known as the Shadow Man, is the smooth-talking, sharp-dressed voodoo bokor who serves as the main antagonist of Disney's The Princess and the Frog. Operating out of his New Orleans Voodoo Emporium, he uses charm, sleight-of-hand, and dark magic from his "friends on the other side" to manipulate Prince Naveen and his valet Lawrence in a scheme to seize wealth and power.
- Felix the Cat - A "transgressor of boundaries" in the most literal sense.
- Fen'Harel - An enigmatic member of the elven pantheon and a recurring mythological figure in the Dragon Age series.
- Gaunter O'Dimm - A powerful creature from higher dimensions in video games based on the novels written by Andrzej Sapkowski as one of the many sentient obstacles to the famed monster hunter Geralt of Rivia.
- Hades - The fast-talking, hot-tempered God of the Underworld from Disney's Hercules, is portrayed as a scheming, sharp-witted villain whose blue flame hair flares red when enraged.
- Heloise - A teenaged girl in the cartoon Jimmy Two Shoes, who is a mad scientist and tomboyish trickster.
- Hokey Wolf - A canine trickster who comes up with different ways to fool his victims.
- Jareth - King of the Goblins from Jim Henson's Labyrinth, who changes forms and uses magic to cajole the story's heroine, Sarah Williams, through a series of puzzles.
- Jerry - The mischievous mouse who constantly plays tricks on the tomcat Tom from the show Tom and Jerry.
- Joker - The main protagonist of Persona 5 and leader of The Phantom Thieves of Hearts.
- Mr. Chapel - Mr. Chapel is a mysterious vigilante who helps people failed by the legal system, contacting them through cryptic envelopes containing past case clippings and the number 555-0132. He demands either a one-million-dollar fee or a future favor of unlimiting scope, drawing on a long-standing network of former clients to execute his investigations. Though willing to use lethal force, Chapel refuses to carry guns, keeps current clients out of danger, and honors every promise he makes. A recurring joke shows him releasing debtors with the line, "We're even. I'm out of your life. Forever."—always met with "Thank God!" Some favors persist such as Boone Paladin's permanent motel access, while K.C. Griffin remains his ongoing partner even after her debt is paid. Subtle hints suggest Chapel's crusade began after a devastating personal tragedy.
- The Pink Panther - A character featured at the start of the film and the animated series of the same name.
- Puck from Gargoyles - Based on the faerie trickster from A Midsummer Night's Dream, he plays a major role in the Disney animated television show Gargoyles.
- Q - An omnipotent being in Star Trek: The Next Generation, Deep Space Nine, and Voyager, who puts characters through various and trials and tricks, seemingly for his own amusement. At times, he seems to be working toward becoming a better, more moral being, or possibly trying to grow the characters and humanity in general in positive ways. However, his ultimate goal seems to consistently remain his own entertainment, as being omnipotent has become somewhat boring after so long.
- Ray - Ray is an enigmatic Southern California troubleshooter who aids people in danger through a covert newspaper ad offering a '65 black Stingray as a coded invitation, never accepting payment but instead collecting future favors he can call in at any time. His identity is deliberately obscured—he variously presents himself as Raymond, Charles D. Stroke, and appears in credits as Ray Simpson, with hints of past ties to U S. intelligence and confirmed service in Vietnam. Ray's Stingray carries shifting, impossible registration data, reinforcing his shadowy background. Gifted with a photographic memory, speed-reading, advanced martial arts skill, and the ability to adopt convincing personas, he also demonstrates expertise in hacking and covert operations, repeatedly eluding authorities and adversaries who attempt to uncover who he truly is.
- River Song - Character from Doctor Who who acts as the trickster to the show's titular trickster. She shows up in an episode, causes trouble, and drags everyone into insane situations before solving the crisis, often with a kiss.
- Rumplestiltskin - A character from the Mother Goose Grimm fairy tales, in which he fits many of the attributes of the trickster and often tricks other characters for his own nefarious purposes.
- Sera - A brash and capricious Robin Hood-like rogue who is a party member in Dragon Age: Inquisition.
- Swiper - A cartoon fox who is the main antagonist of Dora the Explorer.
- Trickster - From the 1994 horror film Brainscan, starring T. Ryder Smith as the Trickster.
- The Trickster (Supernatural) - An antagonist of seasons two and three of Supernatural, who often plays tricks on Sam and Dean.
- The Trickster - From the 1998 video game Thief: The Dark Project. A pagan god of nature and darkness who manipulates the player character into advancing his plans.
- Ursula - From the 1998 film The Little Mermaid who tricks Ariel into giving up her voice in exchange for being able to walk.
- Woody Woodpecker - "A less complex version of the Trickster."
- Zoe - A Targonian kid turned an "Aspect of Twilight", as the embodiment of mischief, imagination, and change in the video game League of Legends.
