= Queen Vida =

Slovenian early medieval folk heroine

Queen Vida is a legendary heroine from the folk tradition of the Slovene minority in Friuli (Slavia Friulana). Her story is closely associated with the Grotta di San Giovanni d’Antro (Slovene: Landarska jama) near San Pietro al Natisone (Slovene: Špeter Slovenov) in the Valli del Natisone (Slovene: Nadiške doline).

== Legend ==
Queen Vida (Slovene: Kraljica Vida) is portrayed as a queen (or "people's queen") named Vida who lived in the castle at Biacis (Slovene: Bijača). She ruled the valley justly and gave alms to the poor. When word spread of the approach of the Huns under Attila, Queen Vida gathered the inhabitants with their livestock and grain and led them to take shelter in the Grotta di San Giovanni d’Antro, which had water, a mortar for grinding, and an oven for baking bread. Attila discovered their hideout and decided to lay siege to it, intending to starve them out. When only one bushel of wheat remained in the cave, Vida scattered the grain over a chasm and shouted that they still had "as many sacks as there are kernels." Convinced that the siege was futile, Attila withdrew with his army. Queen Vida and her people were saved.

== Geographical and historical context ==
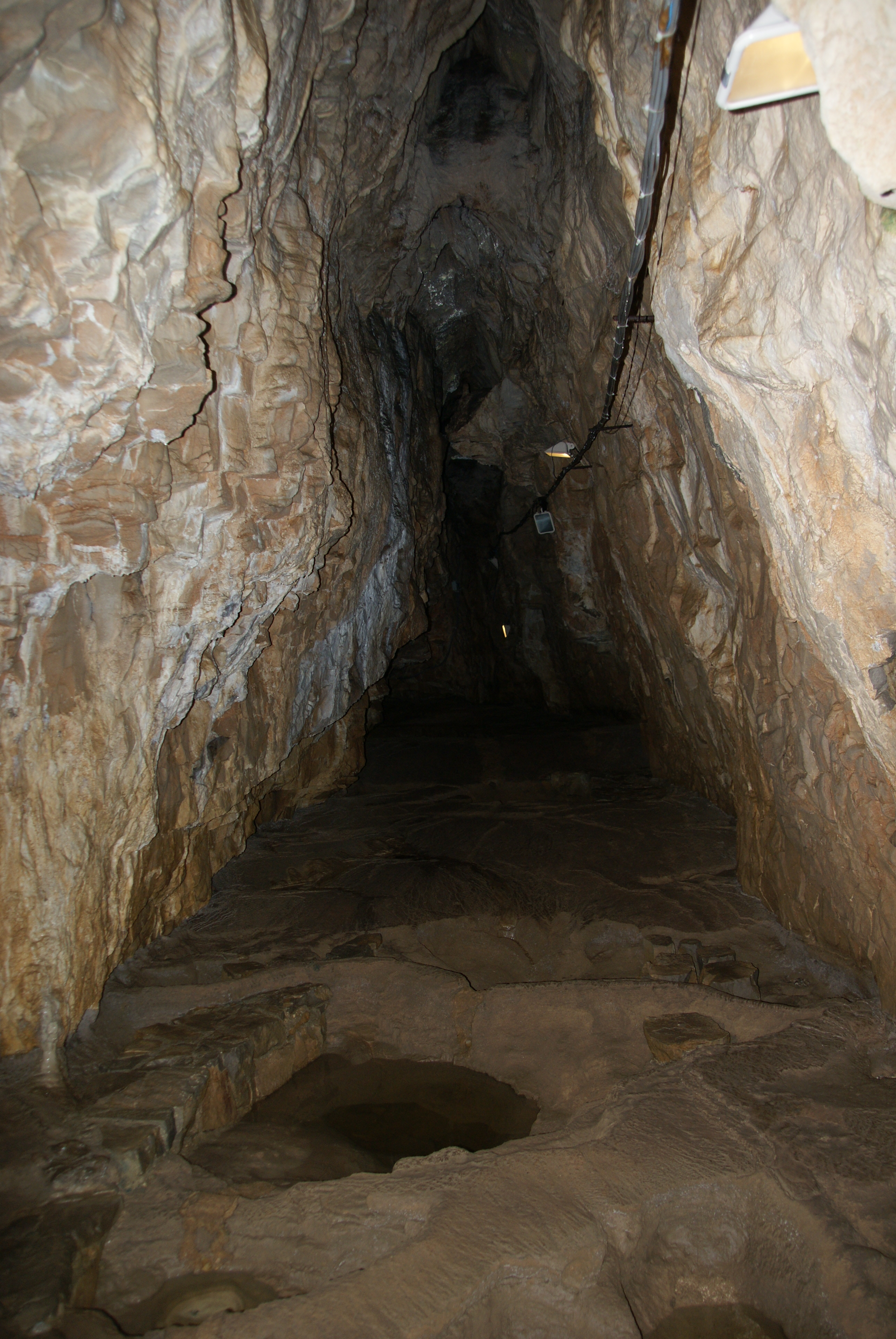
Grotta di San Giovanni d’Antro

The Grotta di San Giovanni d'Antro (Slovene: Landarska jama) is a karst cave complex above the hamlet of Antro in the municipality of Pulfero (Slovene: Podbuniesac). In the early Middle Ages it was fortified, and from at least the 8th century it also served a sacred function; a late-Gothic church space and a wooden altar are preserved there. In local Benecian Slovene tradition, the rock fortress is the setting of the siege and Vida’s ruse.

== Origins of the motif ==
The tale of "Queen Vida" belongs to a wider narrative motif ("a besieged community saved by a stratagem"), with analogues elsewhere in northern Italy. In a study of borderland legends, Pier Silverio Leicht suggested it may be an adaptation of older stories once linked to the historical queen Adelaide of Burgundy or the Lombard queen Theodelinda.

In the 19th century the motif became well known through Anton Aškerc's romance Atila in slovenska kraljica (1890), which places the episode explicitly in the "Landarska jama (Grotta di San Giovanni d’Antro)" and names the heroine "Kraljica Vida (Queen Vida)." From the late 19th to the early 20th century, the first prose records of variants of the story were published by Ivan Trinko and other writers from the Slovene community.

== In literature and the arts ==
- The romance Atila in slovenska kraljica (Attila and Slovenian queen) in the collection Balade in romance (1890) by the poet Anton Aškerc; the text names the heroine "Vida" and sets the action in the Grotta di San Giovanni d'Antro.
- The children’s booklet Kraljica Vida (Queen Vida) (Trieste/San Pietro al Natisone, 1984) in the local Slovene vernacular by Ada Tomasetig, illustrated by Alessio Petricig; published by Editoriale Stampa Triestina and the Beneški študijski center Nediža (Benecian Studies Center Nediža).
- Krajica Vida – Spevoigra, a short opera with libretto by Aldo Klodič and music by Davide Klodič; first performed in San Pietro al Natisone in June 2012.
- Short fiction film Vida (2021, 16 min), directed by Pietro Cromaz.

== Distinction from Lepa Vida ==
The figure of Queen Vida should not be confused with Lepa Vida (Lovely Vida), the heroine of Slovene folk ballads that became central to 19th-century literature through France Prešeren's treatment (Kranjska čbelica, 1832). The genres and core themes differ (Lepa Vida centers on a seduced/abducted mother).

== See also ==
- Slavia Friulana
- List of folk heroes
