= Ken Smith (poet) =

British poet (1938–2003)

- Born: 4 December 1938; Rudston, Yorkshire, England
- Died: 27 June 2003 (aged 64)
- Education: University of Leeds
- Occupation: Poet
- Spouse(s): Annie Minnis (m. 1960) Judi Benson (m. 1981)
- Children: 3 biological, 1 stepchild
- Writing career
- Notable awards: Cholmondeley Award (1998)

Ken Smith (4 December 1938 – 27 June 2003) was a British poet.

== Life ==
The son of a farm labourer, born in Rudston, Yorkshire, Smith had an itinerant childhood. He attended Leeds University and studied with Geoffrey Hill where fellow students included Tony Harrison and Jon Silkin. With Silkin, he later co-edited Stand magazine, from 1963 to 1972. Moving to America in 1969, he taught at Slippery Rock State College, College of the Holy Cross, and Clark University.

He returned to England in 1973, teaching at Leeds University as the Yorkshire Arts Association Creative Writing Fellow from 1976 to 1978. In 1977 he founded the South West Review literary magazine and remained the editor until 1979.

He married Annie Minnis in 1960; they had one son and two daughters, but the marriage dissolved. In 1981, he married the poet and artist Judi Benson; he thus became stepfather to her son. In 2018, Stand Magazine published a special Ken Smith celebration issue for what would have been his 80th birthday.

== Awards ==
- 1964 Gregory Award for The Pity
- Lannan Award, 1997
- 1998 Cholmondeley Award

== Works ==
=== Poetry ===
- Eleven Poems. Northern House. 1964.
- The Pity. Jonathan Cape 1967.
- Work, Distances/Poems. Swallow Press. 1972. ISBN 978-0-8040-0588-3.
- Tristan Crazy, Bloodaxe, 1978. ISBN 0-906427-00-2.
- Tales of the Hunter. Four Zoas. 1979.
- Grainy Pictures of the Rain. Truedog Press. 1981. ISBN 0-937212-02-4.
- Abel Baker Charlie Delta Epic Sonnets. Bloodaxe. 1981. ISBN 0-906427-25-8.
- Fox Running. Bloodaxe Books. 1981. ISBN 978-0-906427-22-4.
- Burned Books. Bloodaxe Books. 1981. ISBN 978-0-906427-23-1.
- The poet reclining: selected poems 1962-1980. Bloodaxe Books. 1982. ISBN 978-0-906427-50-7.
- The House Of Numbers. Rolling Moss Press. 1985. ISBN 0-950-7048-1-4
- Terra. Bloodaxe Books. 1986. ISBN 978-0-906427-94-1.
- A Book Of Chinese Whispers. Bloodaxe. 1987. ISBN 978-0906427934.
- Wormwood. Bloodaxe Books. 1987. ISBN 978-1-85224-037-0.
- The Heart, the Border Publisher. Bloodaxe Books. 1990. ISBN 978-1-85224-139-1.
- Tender To The Queen Of Spain. Bloodaxe Books. 1993. ISBN 978-1-85224-261-9.
- Wild Root. Bloodaxe Books. 1998. ISBN 978-1-85224-461-3.
- Wire Through The Heart. Ister. 2001.
- Shed: poems, 1980-2001. Bloodaxe. 2002. ISBN 978-1-85224-571-9.
- You again: last poems & other words. Bloodaxe. 2004. ISBN 978-1-85224-670-9.
- Collected Poems. Bloodaxe. 2018 ISBN 978-1-78037-432-1

=== Prose ===
- Frontwards In A Backwards Movie. Arc Publications. 1974. ISBN 0 902771 33 7.
- Anus Mundi. Four Zoas. 1976.
- Ten Poets In Leeds (programme notes for readings at Leeds Playhouse). 1978.
- The Joined Up Writing. the x press. 1980.
- The Queen's Dreams (short story) Harry Novak Books. 1986.
- Inside Time (with Dave Wait). Harrap. 1989. ISBN 978-0245547201
- Berlin: Coming In From The Cold. Hamish Hamilton. 1990. ISBN 978-0-241-13072-8.

=== Editor ===
- Ken Smith; Judi Benson, eds. (1993). Klaonica: Poems for Bosnia. Bloodaxe. ISBN 978-1-85224-283-1.
