= List of folk heroes =

This is a list of folk heroes, a type of hero – real, fictional or mythological – with their name, personality and deeds embedded in the popular consciousness of a people, mentioned frequently in folk songs, folk tales and other folklore; and with modern trope status in literature, art and films.

== Historically documented ==
=== Antiquity (up to 450 AD) ===
- Scipio Africanus – Italy, Roman general and later consul who is often regarded as one of the greatest military commanders and strategists of all time.
- Ambiorix – Belgium, was, together with Cativolcus, prince of the Eburones, leader of a Belgic tribe of north-eastern Gaul (Gallia Belgica).
- Augustus – Italy, he was the founder of the Roman Empire. He reigned as the first Roman emperor from 27 BC until his death in AD 14. The reign of Augustus initiated an imperial cult, as well as an era of imperial peace (the Pax Romana or Pax Augusta) in which the Roman world was largely free of armed conflict.
- Attila – Central and Eastern Europe, leader of an empire consisting of Huns, Ostrogoths, Alans, Gepids, and others.
- Boudica – Great Britain, the warrior queen who led an uprising against the Roman Empire in Britain.
- Ducetius – Italy, he was a Hellenized leader of the Sicels and founder of a united Sicilian state and numerous cities.
- Hermocrates – he was an ancient Syracusan general during the Athenians' Sicilian Expedition in the midst of the Peloponnesian War.
- Jugurtha – Algeria, the Numidian king that managed to defeat the Roman Empire.
- Julius Caesar – Italy, he was a Roman general and statesman. A member of the First Triumvirate, Caesar led the Roman armies in the Gallic Wars before defeating his political rival Pompey in a civil war, and subsequently became dictator from 49 BC until his assassination in 44 BC. He played a critical role in the events that led to the demise of the Roman Republic and the rise of the Roman Empire.
- King David – Kingdom of Judah, second Biblical king of Israel, founder of the Davidic dynasty.
- Decebalus – Romania, King of Dacia who managed to defend the kingdom against the Roman Empire.
- Guan Yu (Yunchang) – China, military general during the late Eastern Han dynasty. One of East Asia's most popular paradigms of loyalty and righteousness.
- Hannibal – Tunisia, Spain and Lebanon, was a Carthaginian general and statesman who is considered one of the greatest military commanders in history.
- Bar Kokhba – Judea, leader of a failed rebellion against the Roman Empire.
- Judas Maccabaeus – Judea, leader of a successful rebellion against the Seleucid Empire.
- Vercingetorix – France, chief of the Arverni tribe, who united the Gauls in a revolt against the Roman forces of Julius Caesar.
- Viriathus – Portugal, the leader of the freedom fighters of the confederated Iberian tribes who resisted colonial Rome.
- Zhuge Liang – China, chancellor and regent of the state of Shu Han, is recognized as the most accomplished strategist of the Three Kingdoms period.

=== Middle Ages (450–1500) ===
- Ali ibn Abi Talib - Muhammad’s cousin and son-in-law, regarded as his legitimate successor by Shia Muslims, Fourth Caliph, who was able to destroy the fort of Khaybar by one hand.
- Anawrahta – founder of the Pagan Empire and considered the father of the Burmese nation.
- Antarah ibn Shaddad – Pre-Islamic Arabia, an Arab slave who became a knight, famous for his bravery, pride and poetry.
- Buluggin Ibn Ziri – Algeria, the first leader of the Zirid Dynasty and founder of the city of Algiers on the site of the ancient Roman Icosium in 960.
- Shin Arahan – Myanmar, credited with converting King Anawrahta to Theravada Buddhism and religious adviser to four Pagan kings.
- Jan Breydel – Belgium, butcher and resistance fighter during the Franco-Flemish War.
- Charlemagne – Europe, was king of the Franks from 768, king of the Lombards from 774, and emperor of the Romans from 800. During the Early Middle Ages, he united the majority of western and central Europe.
- Christopher Columbus – Italy, he was an explorer and navigator from the Republic of Genoa who completed four Spanish-based voyages across the Atlantic Ocean sponsored by the Catholic Monarchs, opening the way for the widespread European exploration and colonization of the Americas. His expeditions were the first known European contact with the Caribbean and Central and South America.
- Pieter de Coninck – Belgium, weaver and resistance fighter during the Franco-Flemish War.
- Lekë Dukagjini – Albania, was a medieval Albanian prince, leader of the Albanian resistance against the Ottoman Empire after Skanderbeg's death and the author of the well-known Kanun.
- Eleanor of Arborea – Italy, she was one of the most powerful and important, and one of the last, judges of the Judgedom of Arborea in Sardinia, and Sardinia's most famous heroine.
- Engelbrekt Engelbrektsson – Sweden, rebel and temporary regent in the 15th century.
- Frederick Barbarossa - Germany, Holy Roman Emperor who was a leader during the Third Crusade.
- Leif Erikson – Norse: Icelandic, Viking explorer who is thought to have been the first European to set foot on continental America.
- Fujiwara no Hidesato – Japanese aristocrat and samurai, famed for his legendary and military exploits.
- Eppelein von Gailingen – Germany, robber baron.
- Gajah Mada – Indonesia, unified the Southeast Asian archipelago of Nusantara in the 13th century for Majapahit.
- Genghis Khan – Mongolian ruler of the Steppe during the 13th century, founder of the Mongolian empire.
- Owain Glyndŵr – Wales, nobleman who led a rebellion against the Kingdom of England.
- Godfrey of Bouillon – France and Belgium, leader of the First Crusade, established the Kingdom of Jerusalem. One of the Nine Worthies.
- Guo Ziyi – China, Tang dynasty general who ended the An Lushan Rebellion, respected by the Uyghur chieftains and greatly weaken Tibetan Empire.
- Hildegard von Bingen – Germany, Saint Hildegard, Christian mystic, founder of scientific nature history.
- Joan of Arc – France, a peasant girl who led the French in the Hundred Years' War after she claimed saints told her it was God's will. Burned as a heretic she became a martyr, folk hero, and eventually a saint. She is now one of the patron saints of France.
- John the Blind – Count of Luxembourg and King of Bohemia, is considered a national hero in Luxembourg, partly because of his sacrifice at the Battle of Crécy in 1346.
- Khalid ibn al-Walid - A 7th-century Arab military commander.
- Lazar of Serbia – Serbia, medieval Serbian ruler, who fought and perished at the Battle of Kosovo (1389).
- Liu Bowen – China, key advisor to the Hongwu Emperor of Ming dynasty, also well known for his prophecies and has been described as the "Divine Chinese Nostradamus".
- Prince Marko – Serbia, better known as Kraljević Marko, a medieval prince active during the fall of the Serbian Empire and Ottoman invasion, a hero in Serbian epic poetry.
- Minamoto no Yorimitsu – Japanese samurai and legendary figure, famed for military exploits and monster slaying.
- Miloš Obilić – Serbia, a knight who killed Ottoman Sultan Murad I at the Battle of Kosovo (1389), regarded as a national hero.
- Constantine XI Palaiologos – Greece, the last emperor of the (Eastern) Roman Empire, who died leading his troops in the Fall of Constantinople.
- Marco Polo – Italy, he was a Venetian merchant, explorer and writer who travelled through Asia along the Silk Road between 1271 and 1295.
- Mir Chakar Rind – Pakistan, a 15th-century Baloch chieftain and folklore hero found in the Hani and Sheh Mureed tale.
- Robert the Bruce – Scottish king who defeated the English invaders at the Battle of Bannockburn.
- Rodrigo Díaz de Vivar, el Cid – Castilian knight who battled in the times of Reconquista
- Roger I of Sicily – Italy, he was a Norman nobleman and founder of the County of Sicily. In the Sicilian folklore he is considered the liberator of the island.
- Sejong the Great – Korean king, personally responsible for creation of the Hangul alphabet and many scientific, humanitarian and literary advances.
- Sheikh Bedreddin – Ottoman Empire, theologian and revolutionary.
- Skanderbeg – Albanian national hero who led the resistance of Albanian people against the Ottoman Empire.
- Everard t'Serclaes – Belgium, recaptured Brussels from the Flemings during the War of the Brabantian Succession.
- Tanush Thopia – Albania, medieval Albanian prince from the noble Thopia family who defended the castle of Krujë during its third siege in 1466–1467.
- Wat Tyler – Leader of the Peasant's Revolt, or the Great Rising of 1381 against the imposition of a Poll Tax in England. Killed by agents of King Richard II during parley.
- Ulubatlı Hasan – Ottoman Empire, martyr of the Fall of Constantinople.
- Urška Dolinarka – Slovenia, a farmeress who lead people from Davča against the Ottoman Turks in 1478 and won.
- Jacob van Artevelde – Belgium, statesman and political leader during the Hundred Years' War.
- Vlad the Impaler – Romania, a Wallachian prince who defended his country from the Ottomans, with fictionalised identity as a vampire.
- Vytautas – Lithuania and Poland, led the Battle of Grunwald along with Władysław II Jagiełło against the Teutonic Order.
- William Tell – Switzerland, legendary mountain climber and crossbowman who allegedly shot an apple off the top of his son's head
- William Wallace – Scotland, knight who led a rebellion against England in the early 14th century.
- Wen Tianxiang – Chinese Duke of Xinguo, refuse to yield to the Mongol invaders despite being captured and tortured, enable him to become a symbol of patriotism and righteousness.
- Lady Xian – China, warrior, politician, queen of the Hsien.
- Xuanzang – China, prominent Buddhist monk in early Tang dynasty who traveled to India in the seventh century.
- Yue Fei – China, famous Song dynasty general, best known for leading Southern Song forces against Jurchen-ruled Jin dynasty in the 12th century.
- Zhang Xun – China, general of Tang Dynasty who is best known for defending Yongqiu and Suiyang during the An Shi Rebellion.
- Jan Žižka – Czech knight, commander of Hussite armies in the 15th century.

=== Early modern period (1500–1800) ===
- Bayinnaung – Myanmar, king of the Toungoo Dynasty, assembled what was probably the largest empire in the history of Southeast Asia.
- Dulla Bhatti – A 16th century folk hero from Punjab, known for rebelling against the Mughal authorities due to their unfair taxation system.
- Daniel Boone – United States, an American pioneer in the late 18th and early 19th centuries.
- Yuan Chonghuan – China, Ming general best known for defending Liaoning from Jurchen invaders during the Later Jin invasion of the Ming and defeated Nurhaci.
- Stefan Czarniecki – Poland, nobleman, statesman, military commander; led Poland through the Russo-Polish war, Khmelnytsky uprising and the Deluge.
- Nils Dacke – Sweden, leader of a 16th-century peasant revolt.
- Ahmad Shah Durrani – Afghanistan, founder of the Afghan Durrani Empire.
- Guy Fawkes – England, Roman Catholic restorationist from England who planned the Gunpowder Plot.
- Wojciech Bartosz Głowacki – Poland, he became a Polish national hero during the battle of Racławice on 4 April 1794, when he captured a Russian cannon by putting out the fuse with his hat.
- Ishikawa Goemon – Japan, bandit hero famous for robbing the rich and giving to the poor, though some accounts suggest he may have kept much of his ill-gotten gains. Before being boiled in oil, he saved his infant son at the cost of his own life.
- Nathan Hale – United States, a captain in the Continental Army during the American Revolutionary War.
- Piet Hein – Netherlands, captured the Spanish treasure fleet.
- Juraj Jánošík – Slovak outlaw living in the Tatra mountains, defending Carpathian peasants from the tyranny of Hungarian landlords.
- Koxinga – Chinese Ming loyalist who resisted the Qing conquest of China in the 17th century and defeated the Dutch in Formosa.
- Lapulapu – Philippines, best known for the Battle of Mactan that happened at dawn on 27 April 1521, where he and his soldiers defeated Portuguese explorer Ferdinand Magellan.
- Ngawang Namgyal Unifier of various warring fiefdoms to create the nation of Bhutan.
- Blas de Lezo – Colombia, was a Spanish navy officer best remembered for the Battle of Cartagena de Indias (1741) in modern-day Colombia, where Spanish imperial forces under his command decisively defeated a large British invasion.
- Sebastián Lemba – Dominican Republic, the earliest anti-slavery fighter and Maroon leader in the Americas.
- Lempira – Honduras, was a leader of the revolution against the Spaniards.
- Ram Singh Malam – India, a navigator and craftsmen from 18th-century Kutch region. Introduced European crafts in the region.
- Louis Mandrin – France, bandit of the 18th century liked by the population because he attacked the tax collectors.
- Kuzma Minin – Russia, became a national hero for his role in defending the country against the Polish invasion in the early-17th century together with Dmitry Pozharsky.
- Gilbert du Motier, Marquis de Lafayette – United States, French aristocrat, honoured in the US for service in the American Revolutionary War, slave owner, supporter of constitutional monarchy, with mixed legacy in France.
- Miyamoto Musashi – Japan, a skilled swordsman, soldier, philosopher and author.
- Naresuan – Thailand, one of the most revered monarchs as he is known for his campaigns to free Ayutthaya from the vassalage of the Taungoo Empire.
- Redmond O'Hanlon – Irish, rapparee of the 17th century.
- Maharana Pratap – India, a 16th-century Hindu ruler and Rajput hero.
- Pocahontas – United States, Powhatan princess who saved the life of John Smith and later was married to John Rolfe.
- Dmitry Pozharsky – Russia, became a national hero for his role in defending the country against the Polish invasion in the early-17th century together with Kuzma Minin.
- Bonnie Prince Charlie - Scotland, Jacobite pretender to the English, Scottish and Irish thrones who led the Jacobite rising of 1745 in an attempt to overthrow the House of Hanover restore the Stuart dynasty to power.
- Paul Revere – American silversmith and a patriot in the American Revolution whose 'Midnight Ride' warned patriot rebels of the arrival of the British military troops.
- Betsy Ross – United States, popularly credited with making one of the first American flags.
- Rob Roy – Scotland, outlaw whose word was his bond.
- Deborah Sampson – United States, Female soldier who disguised herself as a man to fight in the American Revolution.
- Daniel Shays – United States, farmer who led Shays' Rebellion in the late 18th century over debt and taxes.
- Shivaji – India, founder of the Maratha empire and leader of resistance to Mughal rule.
- Ivan Susanin – Russia, Russian peasant who saved the tsar in the early 17th century Time of Troubles.
- Taksin – Thailand, king of the Thonburi Kingdom, liberation of Siam from Burmese occupation after the Second Fall of Ayutthaya in 1767, and the subsequent unification of Siam.
- Yermak Timofeyevich – Russia, Russian Cossack leader who began the Russian conquest of Siberia.
- George Washington – United States, American surveyor, British colonial army officer, commander of the Continental Army during the American Revolutionary War, first serving U.S. president.
- Dun Mikiel Xerri – Malta, a Roman Catholic priest who was the head of a failed revolt against the French during the French occupation of Malta and subsequently executed.
- Lin Zexu – China, patriotic Qing official who pointed to the harmfulness of opium which led to the Destruction of opium at Humen.

=== Modern period (1800–present) ===
- Bhumibol Adulyadej – Thailand, ninth monarch of Chakri dynasty, involved in many social and economic development projects, and highly revered by the people in Thailand.
- Albert I, Belgium, King of the Belgians during World War I.
- Johnny Appleseed (Johnathan Chapman) – United States, introduced the apple to large parts of Ohio, Indiana, and Illinois.
- Neil Armstrong – United States, naval aviator, test pilot, aeronautical engineer, and NASA astronaut, who became the first person to set foot on the Moon.
- Asari-Dokubo – Nigeria, a political figure who currently fights against western oil companies in the Niger Delta.
- Mustafa Kemal Atatürk – Turkey, he was a revolutionary statesman, successful General and beloved figure who is revered in Turkey.
- Stepan Bandera – Ukraine, leader of the nationalist and independence movement of Ukraine.
- Cesare Battisti – Italy, patriot, geographer, socialist politician and journalist of Austrian citizenship, who became a prominent Italian irredentist at the start of World War I.
- Billy the Kid – United States, a 19th-century American frontier outlaw and gunman.
- Black Hawk – Midwestern United States, a Sauk Indian warrior who resisted white settlement.
- Isa Boletini – Albania, Military commander and revolutionary.
- Simon Bolivar – Venezuelan military and political leader who led the secession of Venezuela, Bolivia, Colombia, Ecuador, Peru, and Panama.
- Andrés Bonifacio – Philippines, "The Father of the Philippine Revolution".
- Bonnie and Clyde – United States, Depression-era gangster couple known for bank robberies and multiple murders.
- Subhas Chandra Bose – India, revolutionary who led the Indian National Army in an attempt to liberate India from British rule.
- Hristo Botev – Bulgarian folk hero, poet, revolutionary.
- Mohamed Bouazizi – Tunisian fruit vendor who immolated himself in protest of government mistreatment and sparked a successful revolution in that country and the Arab Spring.
- John Brown – United States, attempted to lead a slave revolt in the south by raiding Harper's Ferry, helped spark the American Civil War.
- Antonio Canepa – Sicily, founder of the Volunteer Army for the Independence of Sicily, he is considered a hero by the Sicilian nationalists.
- Butch Cassidy – United States, outlaw and train robber.
- Kakutsa Cholokashvili – Georgia, anti-Soviet guerrilla fighter who led the August uprising, national hero of Georgia.
- Chulalongkorn – Thailand, fifth monarch under the House of Chakri, all his reforms were dedicated to ensuring Siam's survival in the face of Western colonialism.
- Joseph Cinqué – West African man of the Mende tribe, leader of the Amistad slave rebellion.
- Gregorio Cortez – Mexican-American folk hero.
- Davy Crockett – United States, an Indian-fighter and Congressman; died fighting at the Alamo.
- George Armstrong Custer – United States, general who died during The Battle of Little Bighorn.
- Daaga – Trinidad, leader of the St. Joseph Mutiny against British rule.
- Adolf Daens – Belgium, clergyman, politician, and founder, along with his brother Piet, of Daensism.
- Zerai Deres – Eritrea, Eritrean-born man lionized for his act of vengeance against the Italian Fascists in Rome during an imperial celebration.
- John Dillinger – United States, gangster and bank robber. Robbed dozens of banks, escaped from jail multiple times.
- Jean-Jacques Dessalines – Leader of the Haitian slave rebellion and the first president of Haiti.
- Anton Docher – United States, Roman Catholic missionary and defender of the Native Americans.
- Juan Pablo Duarte – Dominican revolutionary who was the primary leader of Dominican War of Independence and a leader in the Dominican Restoration War. In New Mexico, he fought for five years in the French colonial army.
- Wyatt Earp – United States, western lawman in the late 19th century and the early 20th century.
- Mike Fink – United States, the toughest boatman on the Mississippi River and a rival of Davy Crockett.
- Mahatma Gandhi – India, the leader of the Indian independence movement against British rule, employing non-violent civil disobedience.
- José Gaspar Rodríguez de Francia – Paraguay, first consul of Paraguay.
- Giuseppe Garibaldi – Italy, he was a general, patriot, revolutionary and republican. He contributed to Italian unification and the creation of the Kingdom of Italy. He is considered one of the greatest generals of modern times and one of Italy's "fathers of the fatherland", along with Camillo Benso, Count of Cavour, Victor Emmanuel II of Italy and Giuseppe Mazzini. Garibaldi is also known as the "Hero of the Two Worlds" because of his military enterprises in South America and Europe.
- Hendrik Geeraert – Belgium, skipper and World War I resistance fighter known for opening the Ganzepoot after the Battle of the Yser, flooding the polders and halting the German advance.
- Geronimo – United States, Apache military leader and medicine man, fought the United States army during the late 19th century, defending his homeland and people.
- Gauchito Gil – Argentina, legendary outlaw gaucho.
- Salvatore Giuliano – Sicily, the historian Eric Hobsbawm described him as the last of the "people's bandits" (à la Robin Hood).
- Husein Gradaščević – Bosnia, called "Dragon of Bosnia", led the resistance of Bosnians and uprising for autonomy of Bosnia against the Ottoman Empire.
- Zeng Guofan – China, best known for organizing the Xiang Army to suppress the Taiping Rebellion and restored the stability of the Qing Empire.
- Simo Häyhä – Finland, a legendary sharpshooter in the Winter War with 505 confirmed kills.
- Hekimoğlu – Turkish folk hero who led a campaign against feudal lords.
- Wild Bill Hickok – United States, lawman, gunfighter, gambler, scout, Civil War soldier, stage coach driver, performer, abolitionist.
- Hōne Heke – Māori chief who chopped down British flagpole three times.
- Joe Hill – United States, union leader and songwriter wrongfully convicted of murder in 1915.
- Andreas Hofer – Austrian and particularly Tirolian hero who resisted the Bavarians and Napoleon.
- Doc Holliday – United States, dentist, gambler, and gunfighter in the American West of the late 1800s.
- Huo Yuanjia – China, famous Chinese martial artist who defeated foreign fighters at highly publicised matches and established the first civil martial arts association in China.
- Ip Man – China, he was the first man teaching martial artist liberally; his most famous student was Bruce Lee.
- Jambe-de-Bois – Belgium, revolutionary whose participation in the Belgian Revolution, despite being an amputee, was widely praised for his role in the fighting near Brussels Park.
- Jesse James – United States, Wild West outlaw who supposedly robbed from the rich and gave to the poor (in reality his crimes only profited himself and his gang).
- Calamity Jane – United States, a frontierswoman, sharpshooter, and storyteller in the American West of the late 19th century.
- Jigger Johnson – United States, a legendary lumberjack, trapper, and fire warden for the U.S. Forest Service who was known throughout the Eastern United States for his many exploits.
- Casey Jones – United States, railroad engineer who remained in his locomotive and died in a collision while braking to save his passengers and sounding the whistle to warn the crew of the other train.
- Konstanty Kalinowski – Belarus, leader of Belarusian, Polish, and Lithuanian national revival and the leader of the January uprising.
- Kaluaiko'olau – Hawaii, Hawaiian man who evaded deportation for leprosy by hiding in the Hawaiian rain forests.
- Karađorđe – Serbia, leader of the Serbian Revolution.
- Voivode Micko – Macedonia, Serb revolutionary who fought in the Serbo-Turkish wars, Kumanovo uprising, Brsjak Revolt and the Macedonian Struggle.
- Ustym Karmaliuk – Ukrainian counterpart of Robin Hood, who led a peasant rebellion.
- Ned Kelly – Australia, bushranger and leader of the Kelly Gang who fought against a corrupt government system; most famous for crafting bullet-proof armor.
- Giuseppe Musolino – Italian brigand who escaped prison and committed a string of murders while on the run from 1899 to 1901 against those who testified against him at his first trial; became a hero in Calabria and is the subject of numerous songs and movies.
- Ibrahim Nasir - the Maldives, he was prime minister and later president of the Maldives, led the Maldives to independence from the British, officially abolished the monarchy and dogmatic laws, founded the local tourism industry and rapidly developed and modernized the country.
- Józef Piłsudski – First Marshal of Poland, Winner of Battle of Warsaw (1920)
- Ogedengbe of Ilesa – Nigeria, Yoruba chief and hero of the 1877-1893 Kiriji War.
- Sundance Kid – United States, outlaw and train robber.
- Martin Luther King Jr. – United States, African American activist and leader of the Civil Rights Movement, who promoted nonviolent resistance in an effort to end policies of racial segregation.
- Theodoros Kolokotronis – Greek general during the Greek War of Independence against the Ottoman Empire.
- Tadeusz Kościuszko – Belarus/Poland, military leader.
- Paul Kruger – South African Boer leader and President of the South African Republic (Transvaal).
- Rani Lakshmibai – India, warrior Queen of Jhansi, fought and was martyred as the first revolutionary for Indian Independence.
- Lam Sai-wing – China, Hung Gar martial artist and student of Wong Fei Hung, primarily responsible for popularizing Hung Gar style in the 20th century.
- Lampião – Brazilian outlaw, leader of a Cangaço band in Northeast Brazil.
- Abraham Lincoln – United States president during the Civil War.
- Francisco Solano López – Paraguay, president during the Paraguayan War.
- Ned Ludd – Britain, leader of the Luddites in the 1810s.
- Nelson Mandela – South Africa, anti-apartheid activist who became president on apartheid's end.
- José Martí – Cuban revolutionary, one of its greatest national heroes.
- Jack Mary Ann – north Wales, a folk hero from the Wrexham area whose fictionalised exploits continue to circulate in local folklore.
- Chris McCandless – United States, an adventurer whose nomadic exploits under the pseudonym "Alexander Supertramp" earned him notoriety in life, and who would posthumously become a symbol of transcendentalism.
- James Mckenzie – New Zealand, outlaw and inspiration to landless immigrants in early colonial New Zealand.
- Juan Moreira – legendary Argentine outlaw, famed as a skillful knife fighter. He is considered one of the most important figures in Argentine history.
- Giovanni Falcone and Paolo Borsellino – Italy, judges and prosecuting magistrates. From their office in the Palace of Justice in Palermo, Sicily, they spent most of their professional life trying to overthrow the power of the Sicilian Mafia. After a long and distinguished careers, culminating in the Maxi Trial in 1986–1987, Falcone was assassinated by the Corleonesi Mafia in the Capaci bombing, while Borsellino was killed by a car bomb in Via D'Amelio. They were named as heroes of the last 60 years in the 13 November 2006 issue of Time Magazine.
- Joseph Montferrand – Canada, a larger than life French Canadian woodsman popularly known as Big Joe Mufferaw.
- Audie Murphy – United States, hero of WWII, Medal of Honor recipient
- George S. Patton – United States, general, commanded the Third United States Army during World War II, image popularized by the 1970 award-winning epic biographical war film Patton.
- Pedro I of Brazil – hero of Brazilian independence and hero of the Portuguese Civil War.
- Pemulwuy – Australia, an Aboriginal resistance leader.
- Philippe Petit – France, tightrope artist who walked between the two towers of the World Trade Center.
- Sheikh Mujibur Rahman – Bangladesh, led Bengali nation's decade long struggle for independence against then autocratic rule of Pakistan, finally resulting in the Bangladesh Liberation War and the independence of Bangladesh.
- Pazhassi Raja – India, fought against British Raj in south India (Kerala) with guerrilla war tactics.
- Bass Reeves – United States, the first black deputy U.S. marshal west of the Mississippi River. He worked mostly in Arkansas and the Oklahoma Territory. During his long career, he was credited with arresting more than 3,000 felons. He shot and killed 14 outlaws in self-defense.
- Manfred von Richthofen – Germany, air force pilot known as the "Red Baron", ace-of-aces during World War I.
- Manuel Rodríguez – Chile, lawyer and people's hero, who fought the Spanish with often nothing more than crafty disguises.
- Louis Riel – Canada, founder of Manitoba, led two rebellions against the Dominion of Canada.
- Dorus Rijkers – Netherlands, sailor and savior of over 500 men, women and children as the captain of a rescue-boat, in the late 19th century and the early 20th century.
- José Rizal – Philippines, a critic of the Spanish colonizers, was executed at Bagumbayan (now Rizal Park).
- Erwin Rommel – Germany, the "Desert Fox", field marshal, panzer commander during the African campaign in World War II.
- Nana Saheb Peshwa II – India, a leader in the First War of Indian Independence until his mysterious disappearance.
- Juan Santamaría – Costa Rican national hero.
- El Santo – Mexico, wrestler, with heavy fictionalised adventures in movies and comic books.
- Laura Secord – Canada, heroine of the War of 1812.
- Sitting Bull – United States, shaman leader of the Hunkpapa Lakota.
- Crazy Horse – United States, Lakota military leader, known for defeating Custer at Little Bighorn.
- Soapy Smith – United States, infamous 19th-century Colorado and Alaska con-man and gangster.
- Claus von Stauffenberg – Germany, failed attempt to assassinate Adolf Hitler during the 20 July plot.
- Samuel Steele – Canada, a Mountie who brought peace to the Canadian West and law and order to Yukon, preventing bloodshed between the First Nation peoples and the settler peoples of Canada.
- Ludvík Svoboda – Czechoslovakia, general and politician who fought in both World Wars.
- Tamanend – United States, a Native American chief who became the source of many folk legends during the American Revolutionary War.
- Tecumseh – United States, Shawnee chief who formed a Native American confederacy to combat the expansion of white settlers into Native American lands.
- Ten Tigers of Canton – China, group of ten prominent fighters in Southern China.
- Joseph Trumpeldor – Israel, leader of the Jewish forces at Tel Hai.
- Nat Turner – America, leader of Nat Turner's Rebellion (also known as the Southampton Insurrection), a slave rebellion that took place in Southampton County, Virginia in August 1831.
- Dick Turpin – England, highwayman.
- Pancho Villa – Mexico, fought in the 1910s Mexican revolution with Emiliano Zapata.
- Tudor Vladimirescu – Romania, leader of the Wallachian uprising of 1821.
- Wong Fei Hung – China, Chinese doctor, acupuncturist, Chinese martial artist, and revolutionary.
- James Morrow Walsh – Canada, a Mountie who turned Sitting Bull and his peoples from enemies into friends in 1879.
- Hannah Szenes – Jewish paratrooper who was sent to Yugoslavia to rescue Hungarian Jews during World War II.
- Zuo Zongtang – China, military leader of the late Qing dynasty who crushed the Dungan Revolt and recaptured Xinjiang Province from rebel forces.
- Ismail Kemal – Albania, Founding father and first head of state of the modern Albanian state.
- Çerçiz Topulli – Albania, Military commander fought against the Ottoman, Greek and Serbian troops.
- Richard "Beebo" Russell – a ground service agent for Horizon Airlines. Stole a jet from SEATAC airport August 10, 2018. Russell, the sole occupant, who described himself as "just a guy," and "broken guy, got a few screws loose, I guess." About 1 hour and 15 minutes after takeoff, Russell successfully executed a barrel roll before he crashed the aircraft on sparsely populated Ketron Island in Puget Sound, killing only himself. Posthumously dubbed "Sky King", Russell's history of depression and the happiness he apparently found during his final moments connected people to him and serves as a symbol for mental health and the desire for freedom.
- Sully Sullenberger - A retired US airways pilot that is known for his actions on January 15, 2009, after US airways flight 1549 lost both engines because of a birdstrike. He ditched the plane in the Hudson river and saved all 155 lives onboard in an event nicknamed "Miracle on the Hudson".
- Steve Irwin - Australian, his legacy includes his lifelong dedication to wildlife conservation, his distinctive and fearless work with animals of all varieties, and his ability to popularize wildlife education among millions worldwide. His larger-than-life persona, conservation legacy, and enduring cultural influence has made him an iconic figure associated with wildlife protection throughout the world.
- Luigi Mangione – United States, perpetrator in the killing of UnitedHealthcare CEO Brian Thompson case, who has received praise and support from critics of the American health insurance industry.

== Possibly apocryphal ==
- Samson – Israel, one of the judges, who became a legend due to his superhuman strength.
- King Arthur – Britain, legendary British warlord said to have united the Britons against the Germanic invaders, with the support of the Knights of Camelot.
- Beowulf – Scandinavia, legendary Geatish hero later turned king
- Cúchulainn – Ireland, folk legend and the pre-eminent hero of Ulaid in the Ulster Cycle.
- Dalbec
- Moremi Ajasoro – Nigeria, Yoruba queen and heroine of Ife
- Till Eulenspiegel or Tijl Uilenspiegel – Germany and the Low Countries, trickster and jester.
- Fionn mac Cumhaill – Ireland, warrior, leader of the Fianna. Primary figure in the Oisin cycle.
- Fong Sai-Yuk – China, martial arts folk hero.
- Yamato Takeru – Japanese prince and legendary warrior.
- Grettir the Strong – Icelandic outlaw.
- John Henry – United States, mighty steel-driving African-American.
- Heracles – Greece, strongman and demigod.
- Homer – poet credited as the author of The Iliad and The Odyssey.
- Robin Hood – England, outlaw usually associated with the motto "Steal from the rich, give to the poor".
- The Three Musketeers – France, some highly skilled musketeers particularly fictionalized by Alexandre Dumas.
- Hua Mulan – China, heroine who disguised herself as a man to join an army.
- Hung Hei-Gun – China, martial arts folk hero.
- Maui (mythology) – Great culture hero and trickster in Polynesian mythology.
- Ilya Muromets – Kievan Rus', heroic knight from the Russian bylinas.
- Merlin – Britain, the greatest Mage to have ever existed, it's unknown if he was real and if he was an alchemist or a priest.
- Nai Khanom Tom – Thailand, master of Muay Thai.
- Nasreddin Hodja – Seljuk Empire, Muslim philosopher and wise man.
- Miloš Obilić – Serbian knight, assassin of Ottoman sultan Murad I.
- Odysseus – Greece, legendary king of Ithaca.
- Ragnar Lodbrok or Lothbrok – Old Norse; Sweden and Denmark, legendary Viking king.
- Rummu Jüri – Estonia, outlaw who stole from the rich to give to the poor.
- Molly Pitcher – American, Military woman who carried water pitchers for American soldiers in the Revolutionary war
- Siegfried – Germany, the legendary dragon-slaying hero in Nibelungenlied.
- Sundiata Keita – Mali, founder of the Mali Empire and king of the Mandinke people.
- Tardanak – Altaic peoples, cunning boy-knight and opponent of giants.
- Queen Vida – (Slovene minority in Friuli, Italy) queen and heroine, who saved her people from Attila
- William Tell – Switzerland, hunter who began the rebellion against the Austrians.
- Twm Siôn Cati – Wales, robber and trickster nicknamed the Welsh Wizard.
- Achilles – Greece, hero of the Trojan War, the greatest of all the Greek warriors
- Arnold von Winkelried - Switzerland, hero of the Battle of Sempach.
- Jára Cimrman - Czech polymath and universal genius.

== Fictional ==
- Alberto da Giussano – Italy, legendary character of the 12th century who would have participated, as a protagonist, in the battle of Legnano on 29 May 1176.
- Pier Gerlofs Donia – Frisia, legendary giant warrior, freedom fighter and leader of the Arumer Zwarte Hoop.
- The Smith of Kochel – Germany, a well-known national hero, especially in Bavaria.
- Klaus Störtebeker – Germany, legendary pirate.
- Pecos Bill – United States, giant cowboy who "tamed the Wild West".
- Paul Bunyan – United States and Canada, giant lumberjack of the North Woods.
- Chen Zhen – China, martial artist who fought against Japanese aggression in pre-World War II China.
- Febold Feboldson – United States, farmer who could fight a drought.
- Martín Fierro – Argentina, hero of the eponymous poem by Jose Hernandez.
- Koba – Georgia, folk hero whose legend bears a resemblance to Robin Hood.
- Joe Magarac – United States, steelworker made of steel.
- Kintarō – Japan, legendary figure often depicted as a very young boy with superhuman strength.
- Momotarō – Japan, legendary figure from the Edo period who defeated a band of ogres with the help of three animal companions (dog, monkey and pheasant).
- Baron Münchausen – Germany, "Baron of lies", rode cannonball and went to the moon.
- Juan Bobo – Puerto Rico, trickster folk hero.
- Alfred Bulltop Stormalong – United States, immense sailor whose ship was so big it scraped the moon.
- Väinämöinen – Finland, described as an old and wise man with potent magical powers.
- Zorro – Spanish California/Mexico-United States, a masked vigilante.
