= San Pietro al Natisone =

San Pietro al Natisone Špietar (Slovene) San Pieri dai Sclavons (Friulian)
- Comune
- Comune di San Pietro al Natisone
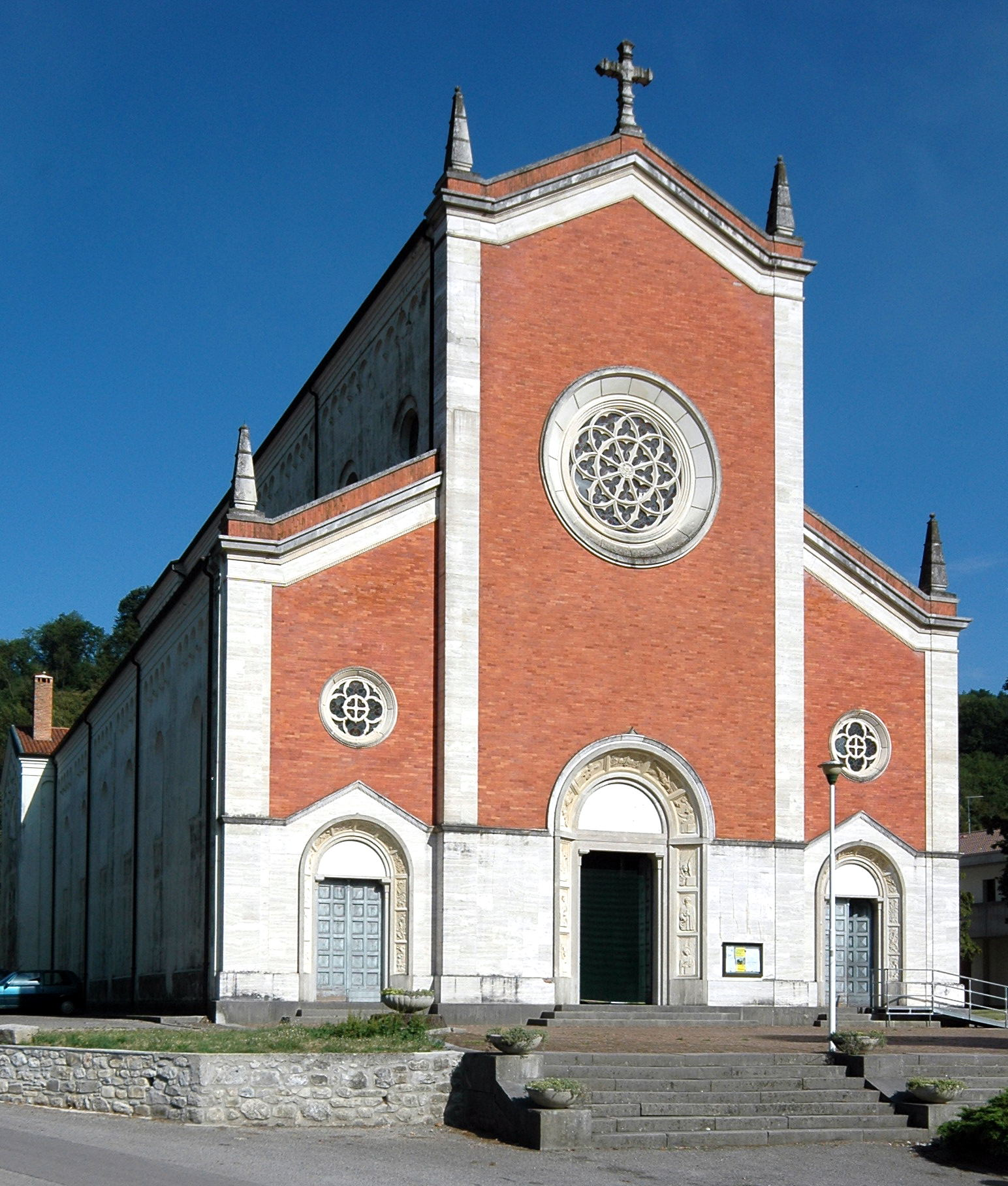

- Location within Italy Location within Friuli-Venezia Giulia
- Coordinates: 46°8′N 13°29′E
- Country: Italy
- Region: Friuli-Venezia Giulia
- Province: Udine (UD)
- Frazioni: Altovizza/Atovca, Azzida/Ažla, Becis/Bečja, Biarzo/Bjarč, Cedron, Chiabai/Čabaji, Clenia/Klenje, Cocevaro/Kočebar, Correda/Koreda, Costa/Kuosta, Macorins/Mohorin, Mezzana/Mečana, Oculis/Nokula, Podar, Ponteacco/Petjag, Ponte San Quirino/Muost/Puint, Puoie/Puoje, Sorzento/Sarženta, Tarpezzo/Tarpeč, Tiglio/Lipa, Vernassino/Gorenj Barnas, Sotto Vernassino/Pod Barnas, Vernasso/Dolenj Barnas

Government
  - Mayor: Mariano Zufferli

Area
  - Total: 24.1 km^{2} (9.3 sq mi)
- Elevation: 175 m (574 ft)

Population (Sept. 2011)
  - Total: 2,229
  - Density: 92.5/km^{2} (240/sq mi)
- Time zone: UTC+1 (CET)
  - Summer (DST): UTC+2 (CEST)
- Postal code: 33049
- Dialing code: 0432
- Patron saint: Saint Peter and Saint Paul
- Saint day: June 29
- Website: Istitutional website

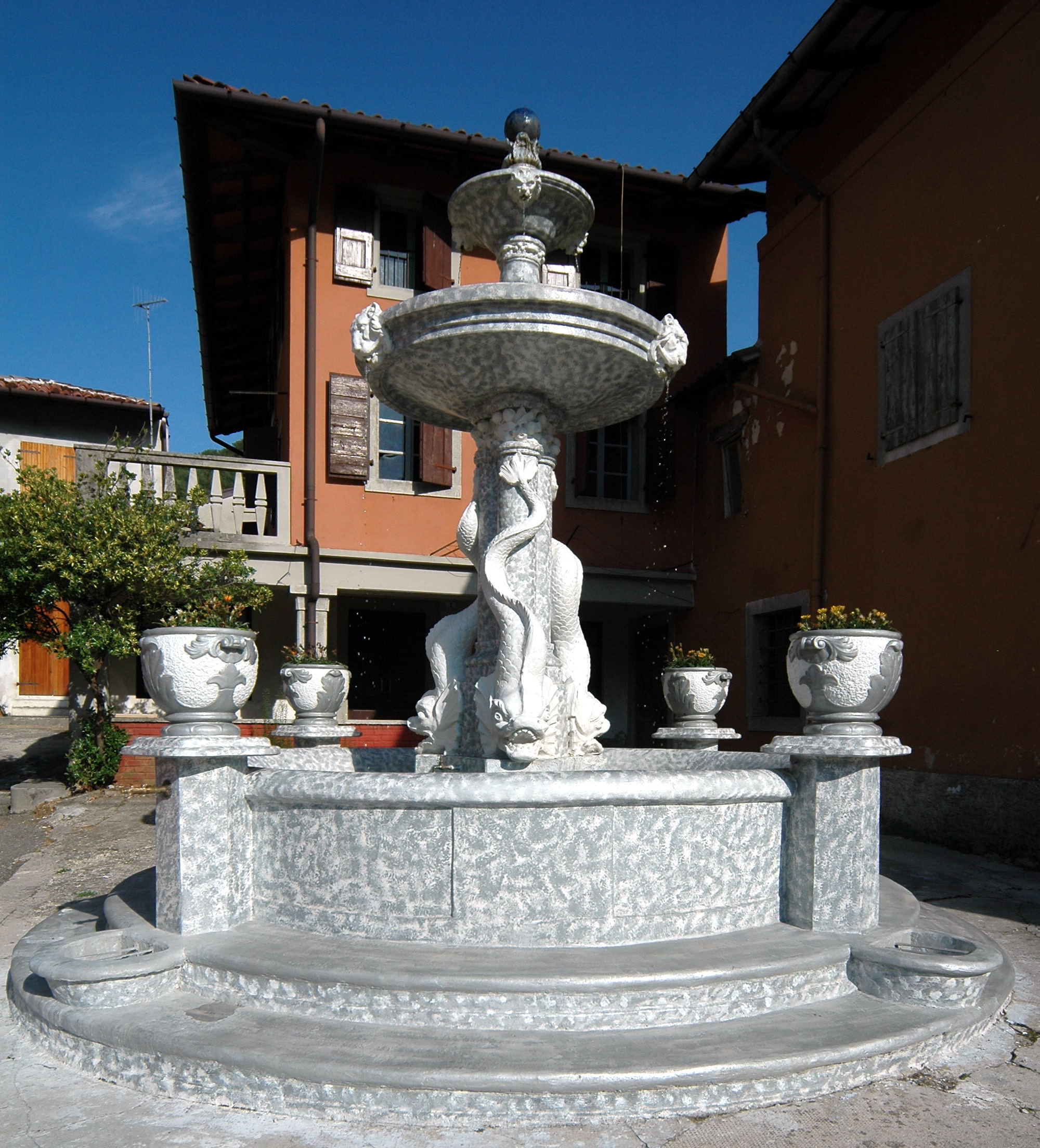
Fountain.

San Pietro al Natisone (Slovene: Špeter Slovenov, locally Špietar; Friulian: San Pieri dai Sclavons; Latin: Sancti Petri Sclavorum) is a comune (municipality) in the Regional decentralization entity of Udine in the Italian region of Friuli-Venezia Giulia, located about 60 kilometres (37 mi) northwest of Trieste and about 20 kilometres (12 mi) northeast of Udine, and borders the following municipalities: Cividale del Friuli, San Leonardo, Savogna, Prepotto, Pulfero, and Torreano. Until 1878, its official Italian name was San Pietro degli Slavi, i.e. "Saint Peter of the Slavs" (cognate with the Friulian name still in use).

== Ethnic composition ==
75.9% of the population were Slovenes according to the 1971 census.

== Twin towns ==
San Pietro al Natisone is twinned with:

- Sambreville, Belgium

== See also ==
- Venetian Slovenia
- Queen Vida
- Friuli
- Slovene Lands
