= Silk (disambiguation) =

Silk is a natural fibre and a textile woven from it.

Silk or Silks may also refer to:

== Arts and entertainment ==
- Silk (novel), a novel by Alessandro Baricco
- Silk, a novel by Caitlín R. Kiernan
- Silk (group), an American R&B group
- Silk, a Philadelphia International Records funk group sampled by LF System on their number one hit "Afraid to Feel"
- Silk Music, a progressive house music label founded in Moscow in 2008 and acquired in 2021 by Monstercat

=== Fictional characters ===
- Silk (character), comic book character created by Dan Slott
- Coleman Silk, a character in The Human Stain
- Doctor Silk, a character in Ninjak
- Patera Silk, a character in The Book of the Long Sun
- Silk or Prince Kheldar of Drasnia, a character in The Belgariad and The Malloreon

=== Film, television and video games ===
- Silk (2006 film), a Taiwanese horror film
- Silk (2007 film), a drama starring Keira Knightley, based on Alessandro Baricco's novel
- Silk (TV series), a British TV series about barristers
- Silk, a BBC Two '1991–2001' ident
- Silk (1986 film), an action film starring Cec Verrell
- Hollow Knight: Silksong, a 2025 Metroidvania that has silk as a primary mechanic

== People ==
=== Nickname or stage name ===
- Silk or Jamaal Wilkes (born 1952), American former basketball player
- Steve "Silk" Hurley (born 1962), American house-music producer
- (Francis) Silk O'Loughlin (1872–1918), American Major League Baseball umpire
- Silk Smitha (Vijayalakshmi Vadlapati, 1960–1996), South Indian cinema actress
- Rochelle Hardaway "Silk" Richardson (born 1970), American conservative commentator and vlogger
- Silkk the Shocker (Vyshonn King Miller, born 1975), American gangsta rapper

=== Surname ===
- Alexandra Silk (born 1963), American pornographic actress
- Anna Silk (born 1974), Canadian television and film actress
- Dennis Silk (1931–2019), British schoolmaster and international cricketer
- Garnett Silk (1966–1994), Jamaican reggae musician
- Gary Silk (born 1984), English footballer
- George Silk (1916–2004), New Zealand photojournalist
- Ilkay Silk (born 1948), Cypriot-born British and Canadian theatre artist
- Joseph Silk (born 1942), American professor and astronomer
- Mark Silk (born 1950), professor of religion in public life at Trinity College (Hartford, Connecticut)
- Paul Silk, British civil servant

== Other uses ==
- Aerial silk, an apparatus used in aerial acrobatics
- Amazon Silk, a web browser developed by Amazon for Kindle Fire
- Corn silk, fibres in maize
- Racing silks, racing colours worn by jockeys
- SILK, an audio compression format and codec
- Silk (brand), a brand of dairy-substitute products
- Silk Engineering, a British motorcycle manufacturer
- Spider silk, silk produced by spiders, used in making webs
- Steel Industries Limited Kerala, a company
- King's Counsel and Senior counsel, a class of British and Commonwealth lawyers often colloquially called "silks" because of the silk gowns they wear
- Kajang Dispersal Link Expressway, a highway in Selangor, Malaysia

== See also ==
- Robert Kilroy-Silk (born 1942), British former politician and TV presenter
- Cilk, a programming language
- Silkin, a surname
- Silkk the Shocker, American rapper
