= Jack Mary Ann =

Jack Mary Ann is a folk hero whose legendary exploits in the Wrexham area of Wales in the 1920s and 1930s are celebrated in a series of jokes and tales transmitted in local oral tradition. Jack was a coal miner. Jack's nickname comes from the common practice of distinguishing local men (in an area known for its poverty of surnames) by the use of the wife's Christian or given name. Jack may be considered an archetypal trickster figure and the tales involve his various intrigues with hostile authority figures such as landlords, bailiffs and employers. His legendary activities celebrate his fecklessness and irresponsibility. Jack's quick tongue does not generally save him from the consequences of his actions but provides an ironic commentary on his plight and on the values of more respectable citizens. The popularity of the Jack Mary Ann tales may suggest an undercurrent of local opposition to the respectable and supposedly dominant norms of non-conformist Christianity generally held to be an expression of Welsh identity in this period.

== The tales ==
Mary Ann fell one night ill and asked Jack to go for the doctor. Jack was reluctant to do so because he was afraid of being attacked while walking through a rough area at night. Eventually he grabbed a kitchen chair and made to leave. Mary Ann called Jack back and asked him what he wanted the chair for. Jack said that if he did meet anyone who wanted to fight him, he would tell them he was moving house secretly to avoid paying the rent and that there were five men behind him with the other chairs and the kitchen table.

Jack and Mary Ann avoided paying rent on their cottage. One day a bailiff called to serve them with notice to quit. They hid when he knocked. He tried to push the notice under the door. Jack took the bellows from the fire and blew the notice back outside. As the bailiff walked away he was heard to remark, "No wonder Jack won't pay rent on a draughty old place like that!"

The landlord decided to give up the struggle about the rent and called at the house one day and told Mary Ann he was going to give them the house. Jack returned from the pub and Mary Ann told him about their surprising good fortune. Jack asked Mary Ann if she'd accepted the house. When she said she had, he became angry: "You stupid woman! We paid nothing before, now we'll have to pay the rates!"

Surprisingly, Jack used to work as a policeman. This ended when the new police inspector walked into a local pub which was still open after licensed hours and found Jack with a pint in one hand leaning on the pub piano leading the bar in a chorus. The inspector, amazed at this gross breach of duty, brought out his notebook intending to record Jack's name and offence, and asked Jack, "Who are you?" Jack replied, "I'm the bobby that's just lost his job".
