= Pulfero =

Pulfero Podbonesec (Slovene) Pulfar (Friulian)
- Comune
- Comune di Pulfero
- Location within Italy Location within Friuli-Venezia Giulia
- Coordinates: 46°10′N 13°29′E
- Country: Italy
- Region: Friuli-Venezia Giulia
- Province: Udine (UD)
- Frazioni: Antro/Landar, Biacis/Bijača, Brischis/Brišča, Calla/Kau, Cicigolis/Ščigla, Coliessa/Kolieša, Comugnero/Kamunjar, Cras/Kras, Erbezzo/Arbeč, Goregnavas/Gorenja Vas, Ialig/Jalči, Lasiz/Laze, Linder/Linder, Loch/Log, Mersino (collectiv name of following villages: Bardo/Nabardo, Clin/Klin, Ierep/Jerebi, Iuretig/Juretiči, Marseu/Marsieli, Medves/Medvieži, Oballa/Obali, Pozzera/Pocera, Zorza/Žorži), Molino/Malin, Montefosca/Čarni Varh, Paceida/Pačejda, Pegliano/Ofijan (collectiv name of following villages: Cedarmas/Čedarmaci, Cocianzi/Kočjanci, Dorbolò/Dorboli, Flormi/Floram, Parmizi/Parmici, Sosgne/Šošnja, Stonder/Štonderi), Perovizza/Peruovca, Podvarschis/Podvaršč, Pulfero/Podbuniesac, Rodda collectiv name of following villages: Bizonta/Bizonti, Brocchiana/Bročjana, Buttera/Butera, Clavora/Klavora, Cranzove/Kranjcove, Domenis/Domejža, Lacove/Lahove, Oriecuia/Oriehuje, Ossiach/Ošjak, Pocovaz/Pokovac, Puller/Pulerji, Scubina/Skubini, Sturam/Šturmi, Tumaz/Tuomac, Uodgnach/Uodnjak, Zeiaz/Zejci), Spagnut/Podšpanjud, Specognis/Špehuonja, Spignon/Varh, Stupizza/Štupca, Tarcetta/Tarčet, Zapatocco/Zapatok

Government
  - Mayor: Camillo Melissa 25 May 2014 (Lista civica)

Area
  - Total: 48.1 km^{2} (18.6 sq mi)
- Elevation: 184 m (604 ft)

Population (Dec. 2011)
  - Total: 1,047
  - Density: 21.8/km^{2} (56.4/sq mi)
- Time zone: UTC+1 (CET)
  - Summer (DST): UTC+2 (CEST)
- Postal code: 33046
- Dialing code: 0432
- Patron saint: Florian
- Saint day: 4 May
- Website: Institutional website

Pulfero (Slovene: Podbonesec; Friulian: Pulfar) is a comune (municipality) in the Regional decentralization entity of Udine in the Italian region Friuli-Venezia Giulia, located about 60 kilometres (37 mi) northwest of Trieste and about 20 kilometres (12 mi) northeast of Udine, on the border with Slovenia, and borders the following municipalities: Faedis, Kobarid (Slovenia), San Pietro al Natisone, Savogna, and Torreano.

Pulfero localities (frazioni) include: Antro/Landar, Biacis/Bijača, Brischis/Brišča, Calla/Kau, Cicigolis/Ščigla, Coliessa/Kolieša, Comugnero/Kamunjar, Cras/Kras, Erbezzo/Arbeč, Goregnavas/Gorenja Vas, Ialig/Jalči, Lasiz/Laze, Linder/Linder, Loch/Log, Mersino (collective name of following villages: Bardo/Nabardo, Clin/Klin, Ierep/Jerebi, Iuretig/Juretiči, Marseu/Marsieli, Medves/Medvieži, Oballa/Obali, Pozzera/Pocera, Zorza/Žorži), Molino/Malin, Montefosca/Čarni Varh, Paceida/Pačejda, Pegliano/Ofijan (collective name of following villages: Cedarmas/Čedarmaci, Cocianzi/Kočjanci, Dorbolò/Dorboli, Flormi/Floram, Parmizi/Parmici, Sosgne/Šošnja, Stonder/Štonderi), Perovizza/Peruovca, Podvarschis/Podvaršč, Pulfero/Podbuniesac, Rodda (collective name of following villages: Bizonta/Bizonti, Brocchiana/Bročjana, Buttera/Butera, Clavora/Klavora, Cranzove/Kranjcove, Domenis/Domejža, Lacove/Lahove, Oriecuia/Oriehuje, Ossiach/Ošjak, Pocovaz/Pokovac, Puller/Pulerji, Scubina/Skubini, Sturam/Šturmi, Tumaz/Tuomac, Uodgnach/Uodnjak, Zeiaz/Zejci), Spagnut/Podšpanjud, Specognis/Špehuonja, Spignon/Varh, Stupizza/Štupca, Tarcetta/Tarčet, Zapatocco/Zapatok.

As of 31 December 2011, it had a population of 1,047 and an area of 48.1 km^{2} (18.6 sq mi).

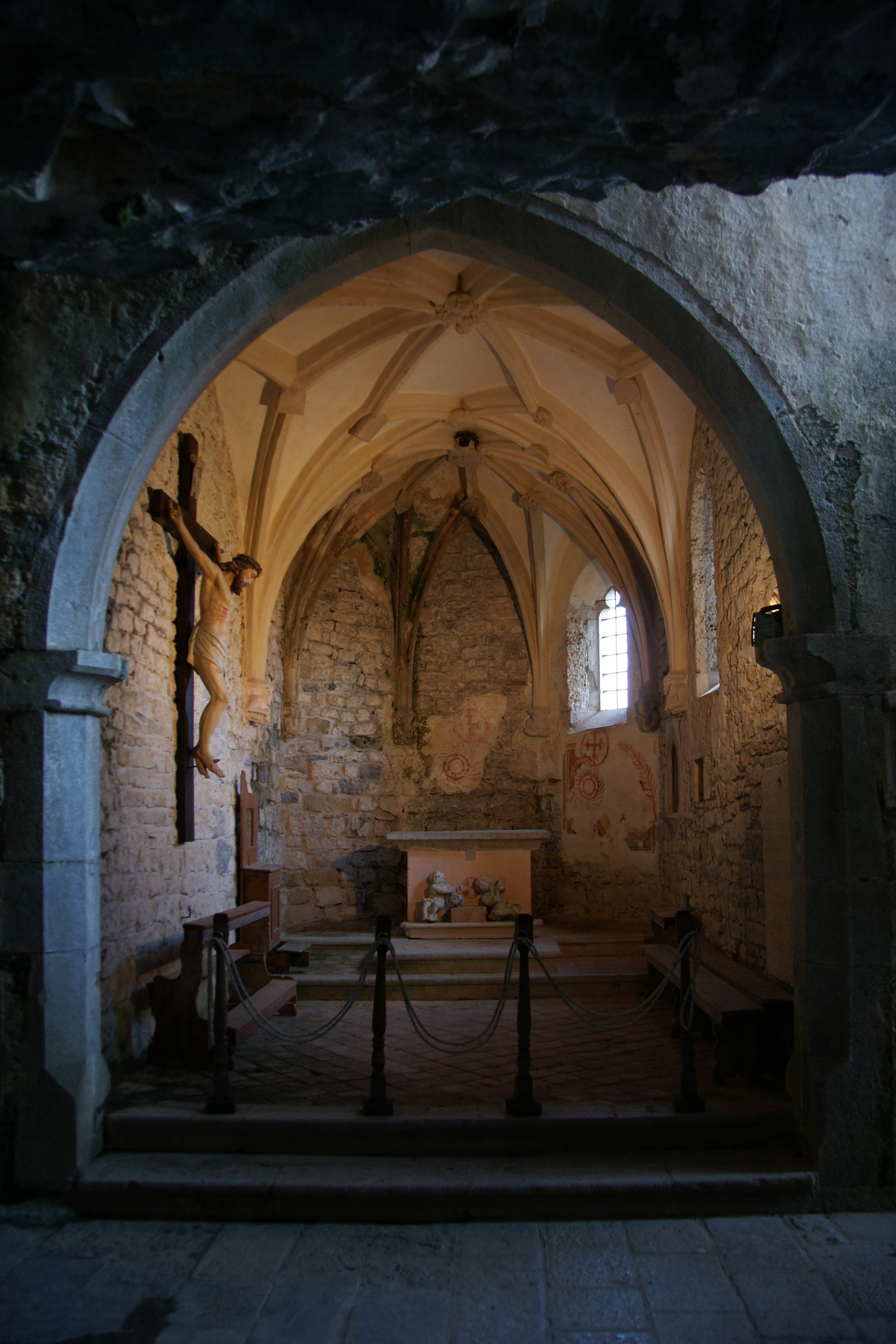
Church of San Giovanni d'Antro

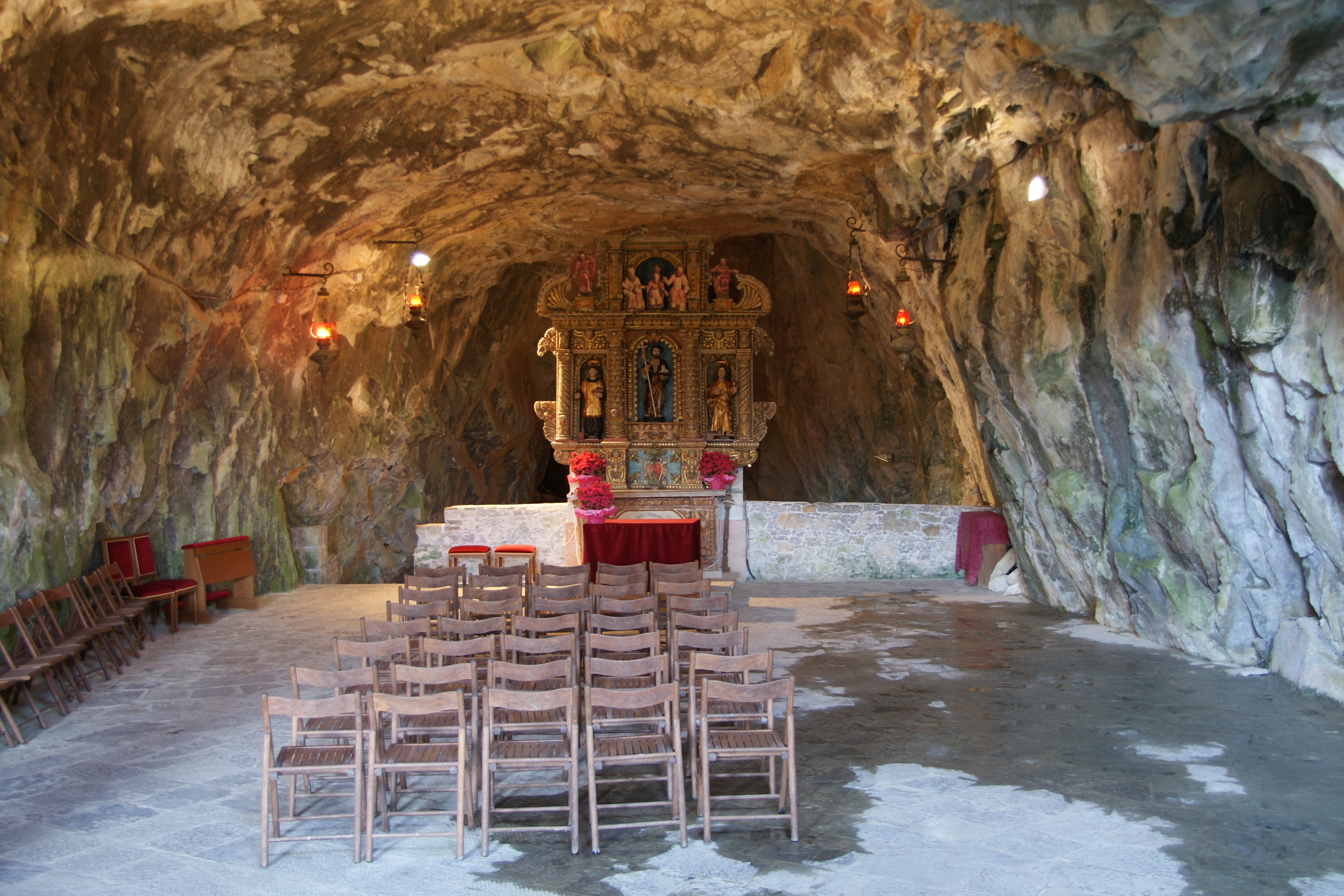
Church of San Giovanni d'Antro

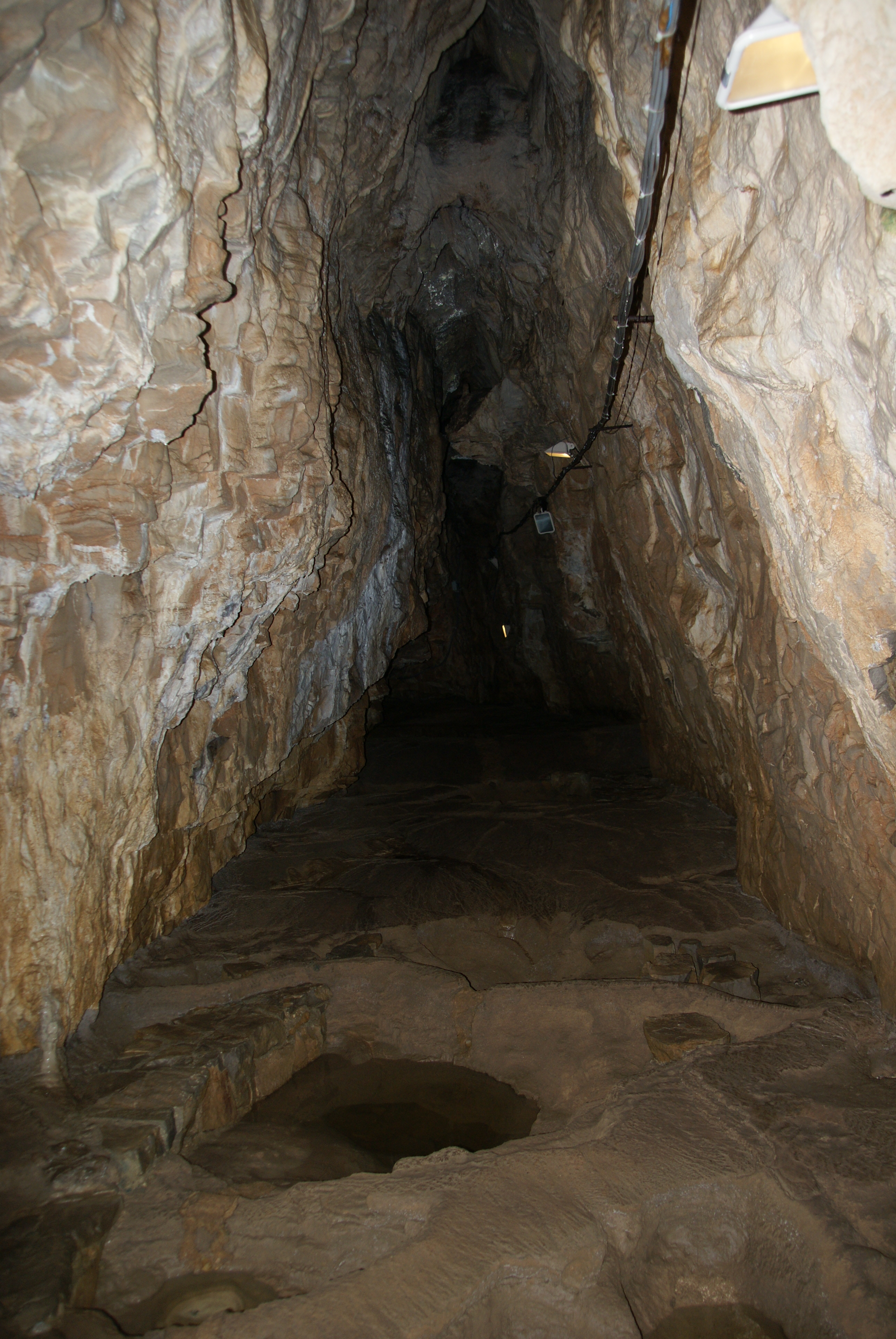
San Giovanni d'Antro cave

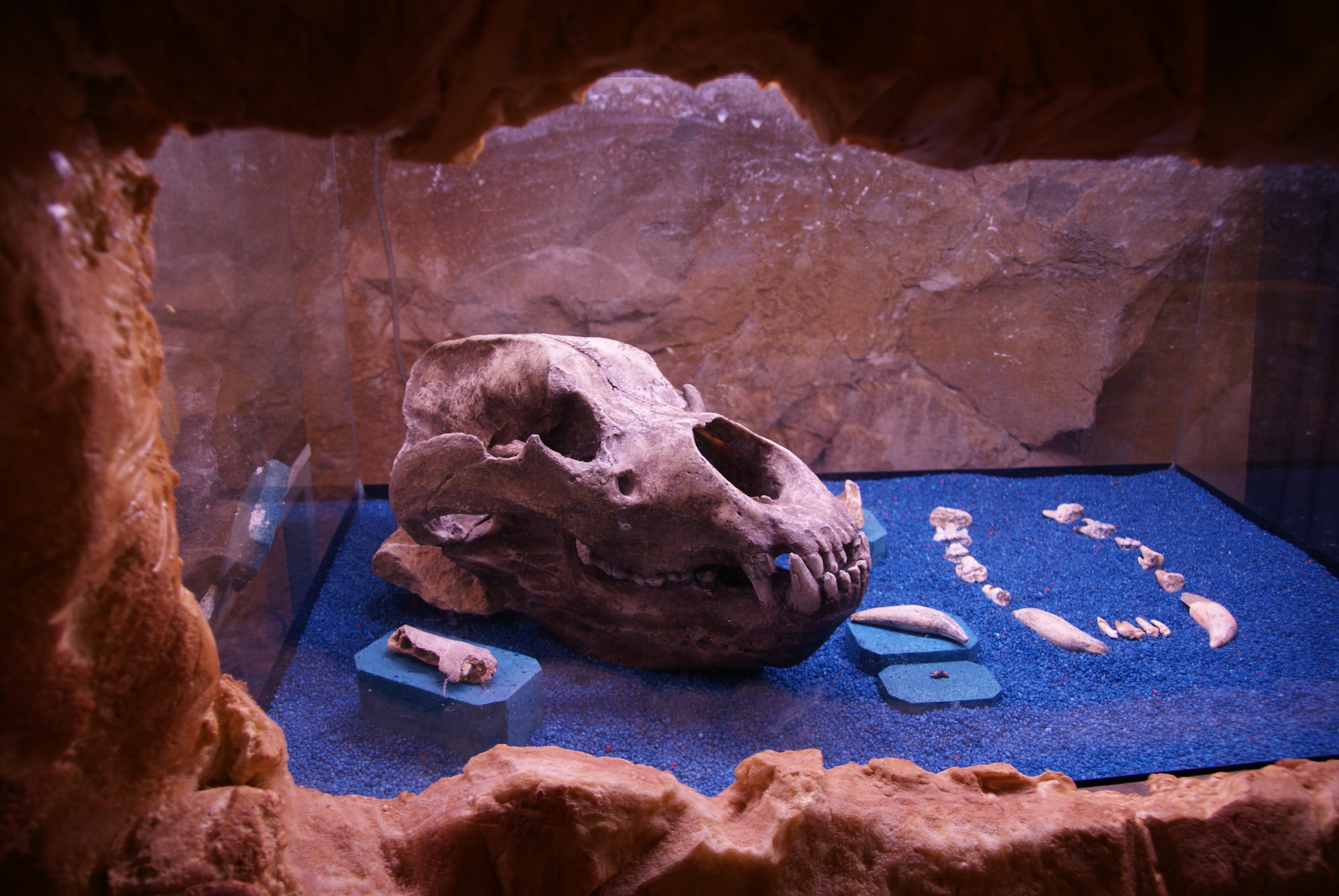
Skull of a cave bear (Ursus spelaeus) in the cave San Giovanni d'Antro

== Demographics ==
84.6% of the population were Slovenes according to the census 1971.

Historical population

Year	Pop.	±%
1861	?	—
1871	3,491	—
1881	3,492	+0.0%
1901	3,779	+8.2%
1911	3,991	+5.6%

Year	Pop.	±%
1921	4,066	+1.9%
1931	3,864	−5.0%
1936	3,681	−4.7%
1951	3,735	+1.5%
1961	3,306	−11.5%

Year	Pop.	±%
1971	2,237	−32.3%
1981	1,832	−18.1%
1991	1,398	−23.7%
2001	1,202	−14.0%

Source: Data from ISTAT

== See also ==
- Venetian Slovenia
- Friuli
- Slovene Lands
