= Folk hero =

Celebrated type of person or character

A folk hero or national hero is a type of hero or heroine–real, fictional, or mythical–with their name, personality and deeds embedded in the popular consciousness of a people, mentioned frequently in folk songs, folk tales and other folklore; and with modern trope status in literature, art and films.

== Overview ==
The folk hero is set apart from a typical mythological hero by forsaking traditionally selfish and individualistic goals in favor of more altruistic goals and deeds. Many folk heroes set themselves apart from others by taking up a fight for the common people against the oppression or corruption of the established power structure, this sort of folk hero often operates outside the law in some way, such as English folk hero Robin Hood.

Another sort of folk hero could be described as the culture hero, a benefactor who provides for a culture or group of people, often as a legendary founder or reformer, who made a major impact which defines the group they were a part of, such as Mustafa Kemal Atatürk.

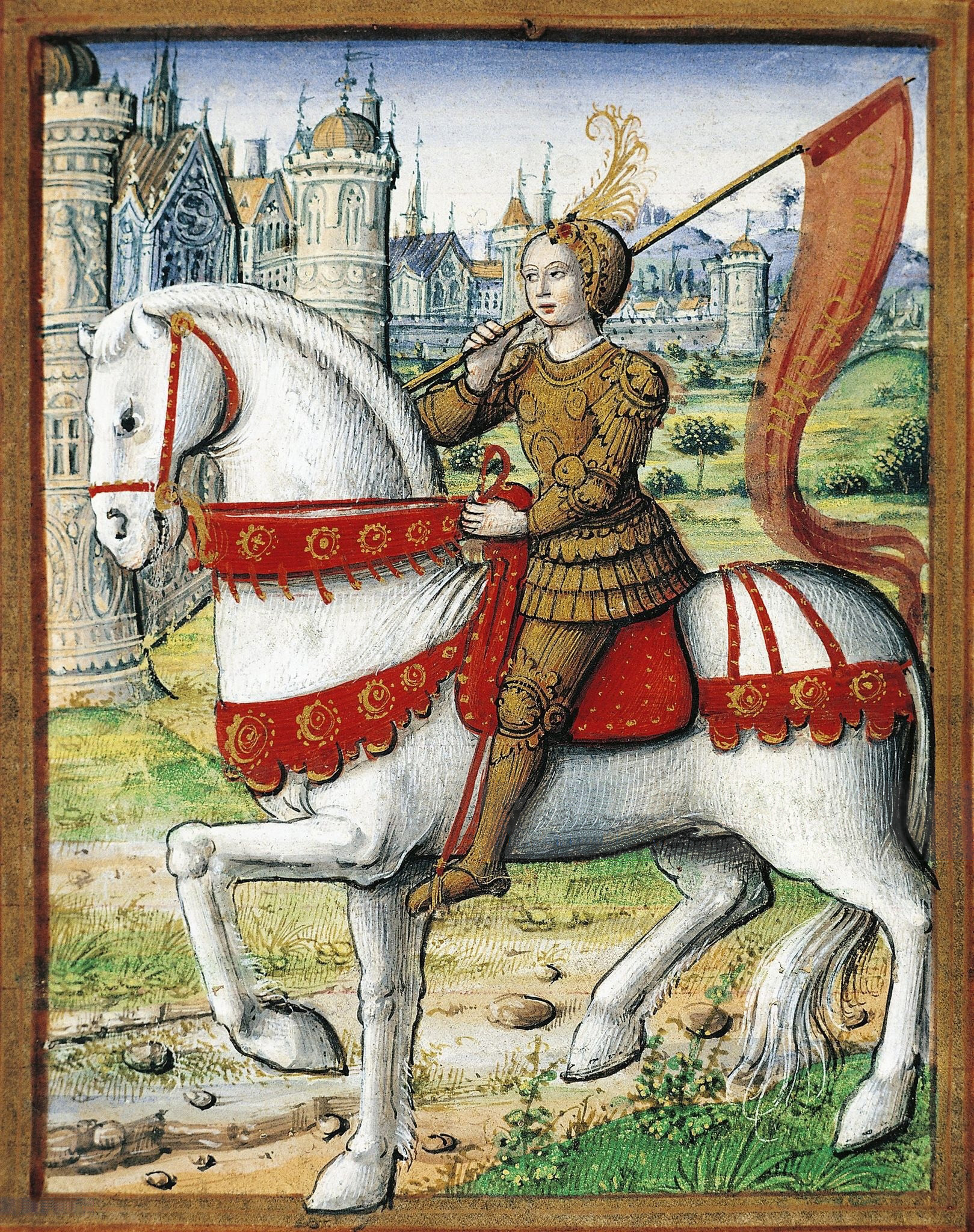
Joan of Arc depicted on horseback in an illustration from a 1505 manuscript. The martyr and saint Joan of Arc is a national hero in France.

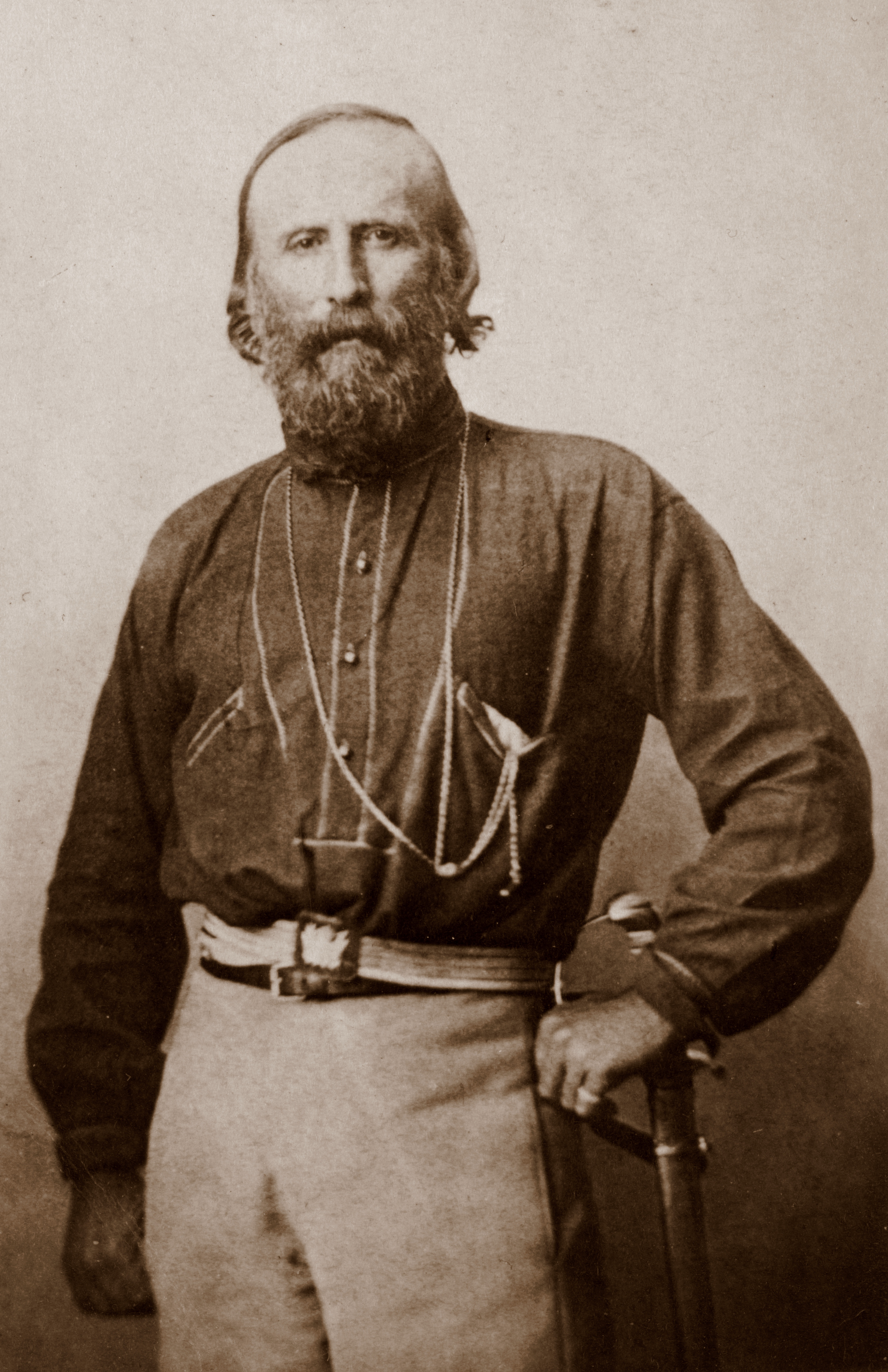
Giuseppe Garibaldi, one of Italy's "fathers of the fatherland", is celebrated as one of the greatest generals of modern times, and as the "Hero of the Two Worlds" because of his military enterprises in South America and Europe. He fought in numerous military campaigns that led to the Italian unification

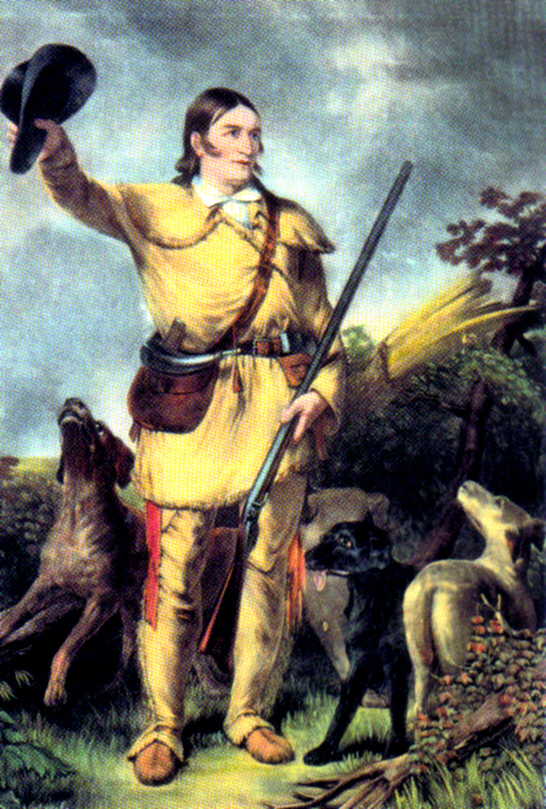
Davy Crockett, an American folk hero

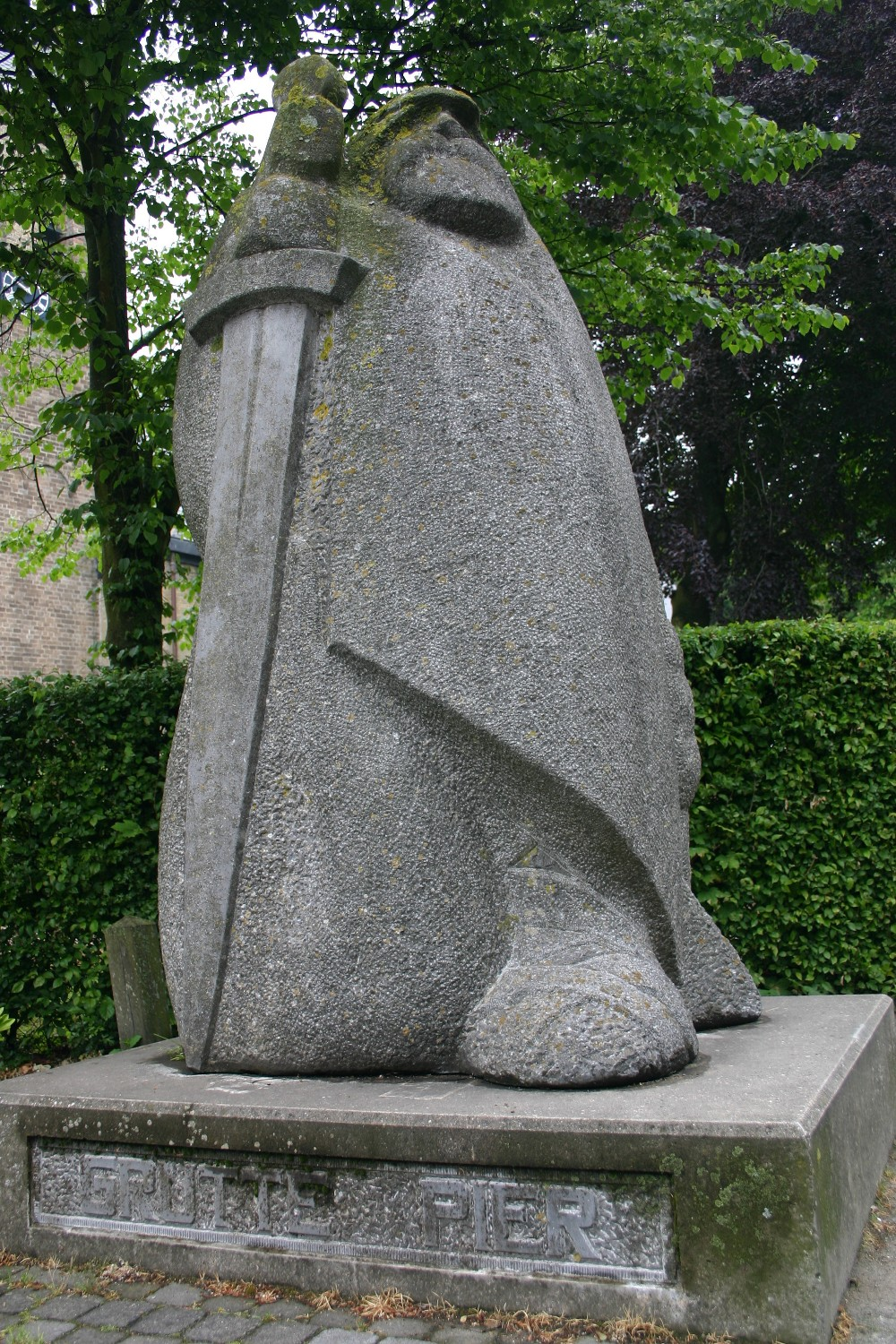
Statue of Pier Gerlofs Donia, a Frisian folk hero

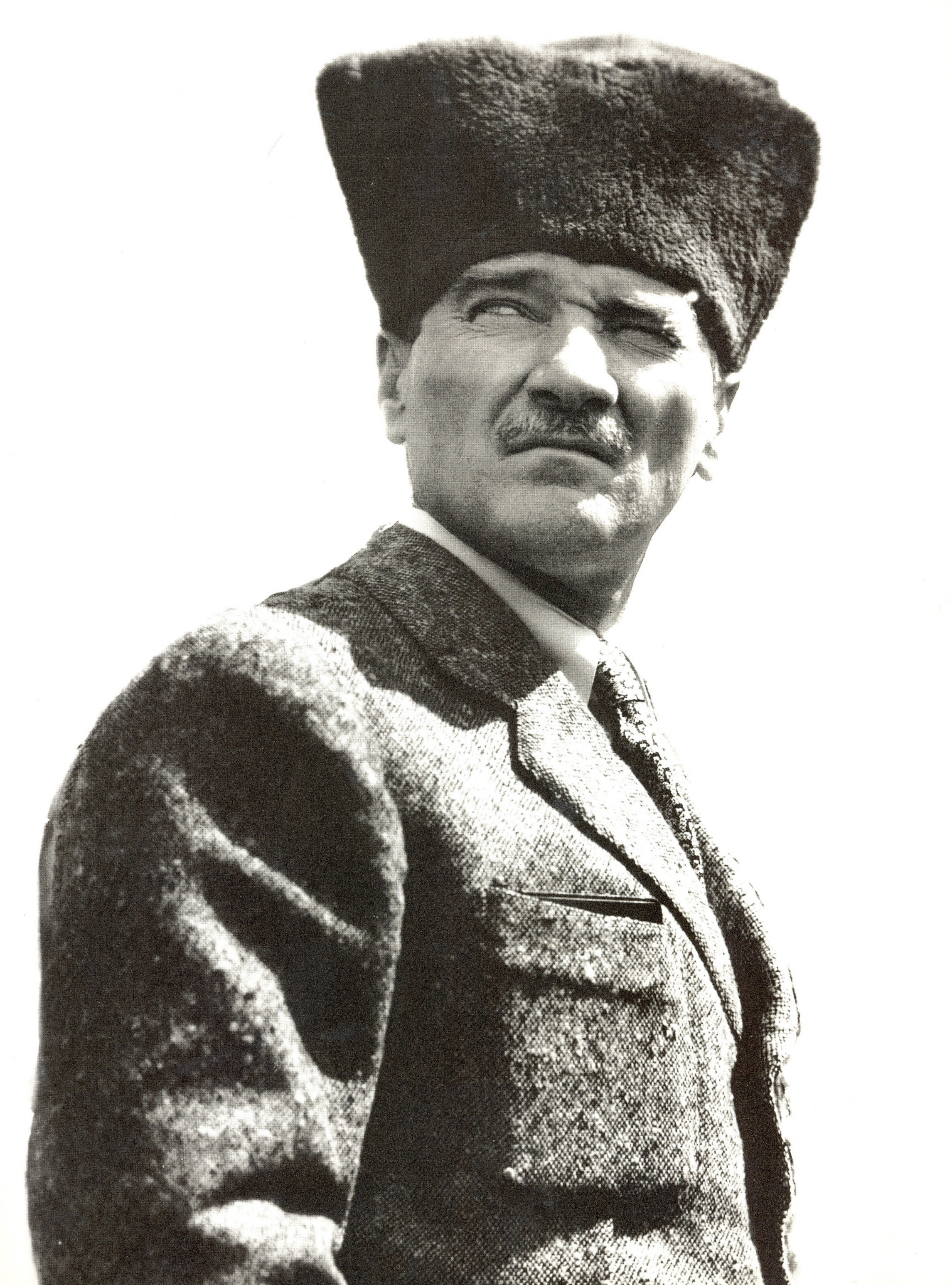
Mustafa Kemal Atatürk, a Turkish national hero

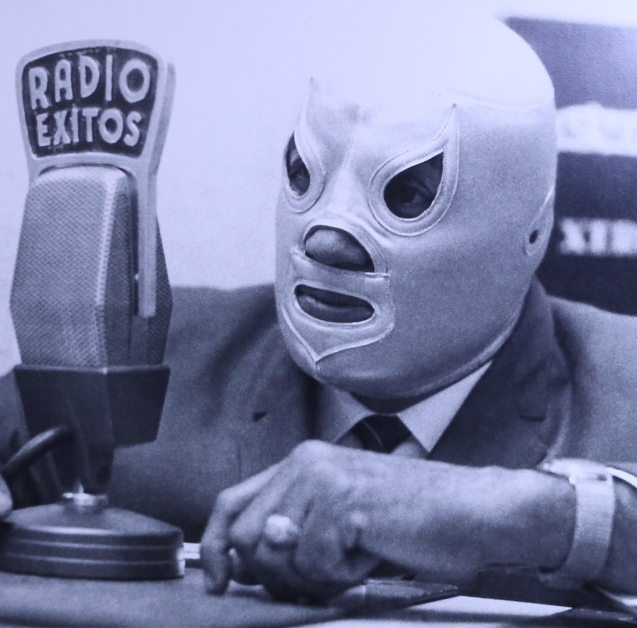
El Santo, a Mexican folk hero

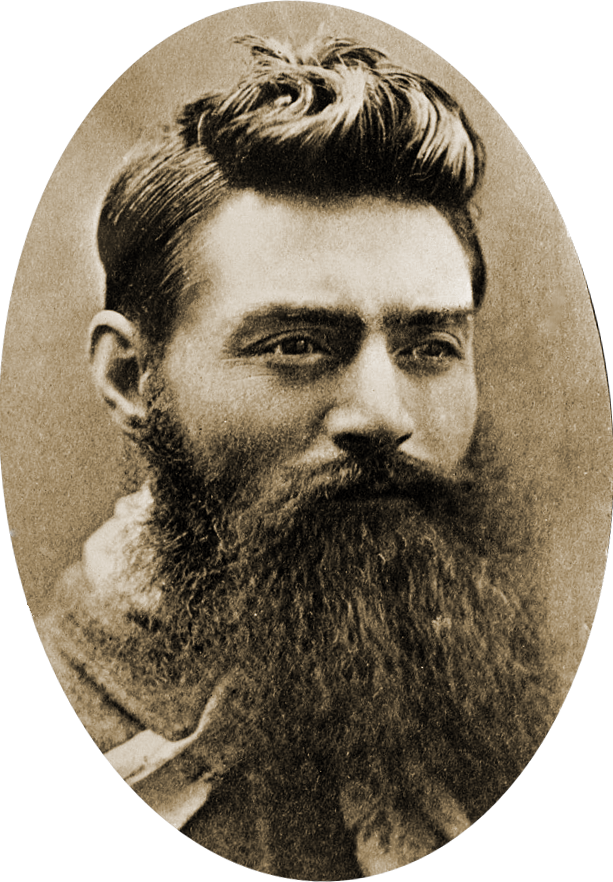
Ned Kelly, an Australian folk hero

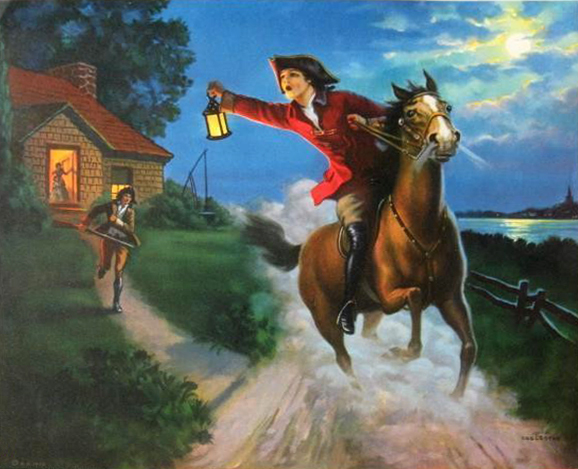
Paul Revere, American folk hero depicted in his famous Midnight Ride

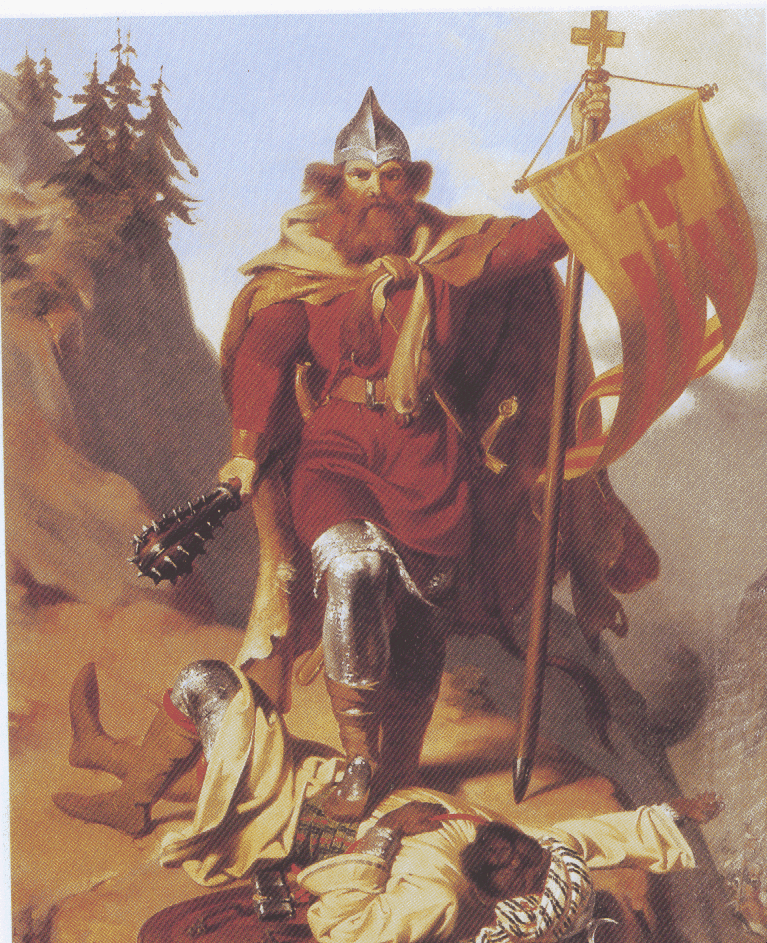
Otger Cataló, A fictional Catalan folk hero who legend credits with resisting the Moorish conquerors of Catalonia.

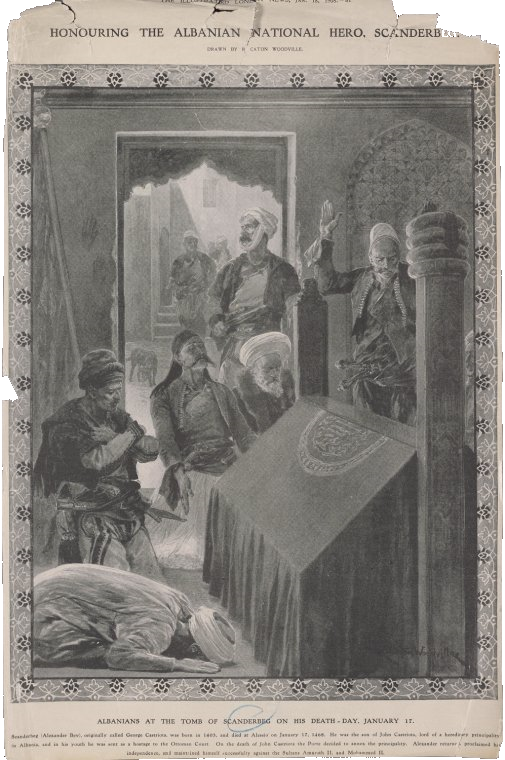
Honoring the Albanian National Hero, Scanderbeg. Albanians at the Tomb of Scanderbeg on His Death Day. Drawn by R. Caton Woodville, 17 January 1908.

== See also ==
- Culture hero
- List of folk heroes

== General and cited references ==
- Seal, Graham. Encyclopedia of Folk Heroes. ABC-CLIO, 2001.
