= Silkin =

Surname

Silkin is a surname. Notable people with the surname include:

- John Silkin (1923–1987), British politician
- Jon Silkin (1930–1997), British poet
- Lewis Silkin, 1st Baron Silkin (1889–1972), British politician
- Samuel Silkin, Baron Silkin of Dulwich (1918–1988), British politician
- Sergei Silkin (born 1961), Russian football player and coach
