= Kasperi (given name) =

Kasperi is a masculine given name. Notable people with the name include:

- Kasperi Heikkinen, Finnish guitarist
- Kasperi Kapanen (born 1996), Finnish ice hockey right winger
- Kasperi Kotkaniemi (born 1999), Finnish ice hockey goaltender
- Kasperi Liikonen (born 1994), Finnish football winger
- Kasperi Nuto (born 1995), Finnish ice hockey winger
- Kasperi Torikka (born 1999), Finnish ice hockey defenceman
- Kasperi Salo (born 1979), Finnish badminton player
