= Kotkaniemi =

Kotkaniemi is a Finnish surname. Notable people with the surname include:

- Jesperi Kotkaniemi (born 2000), Finnish ice hockey centre
- Kasperi Kotkaniemi (born 1999), Finnish ice hockey goaltender
