= Kasperi =

Kasperi can refer to:

- Kasperi (given name), masculine given name
- Kasperi, Seinäjoki, district of the city of Seinäjoki, Finland
- Per Kasperi (born 1993), Swedish ice sledge hockey player
