= Tuomas Huhtanen =

Finnish ice hockey player

- Born: March 16, 1987 (age 38) Noormarkku, Finland
- Height: 6 ft 1 in (185 cm)
- Weight: 190 lb (86 kg; 13 st 8 lb)
- Position: Left Wing
- Shot: Left
- Played for: Ässät; Lukko; HIFK; Jokipojat; Ilves; KooKoo; Peliitat Heinola; Kiekko-Vantaa; Karhu HT
- NHL draft: Undrafted
- Playing career: 2005–2021

Tuomas Huhtanen (born March 16, 1987) is a Finnish professional ice hockey left winger who currently plays for Jokipojat of the Mestis league. He used to play for Ässät.

== Career statistics ==
			Regular season					Playoffs
Season	Team	League	GP	G	A	Pts	PIM	GP	G	A	Pts	PIM
2002–03	Porin Ässät U16	U16 SM-sarja	10	8	7	15	14	7	2	4	6	8
2002–03	Porin Ässät U18	U18 SM-sarja	4	0	2	2	4	—	—	—	—	—
2003–04	Porin Ässät U18	U18 SM-sarja	18	4	2	6	8	—	—	—	—	—
2003–04	Porin Ässät U20	U20 SM-liiga	3	0	0	0	0	—	—	—	—	—
2004–05	Porin Ässät U18	U18 SM-sarja	18	9	5	14	26	—	—	—	—	—
2004–05	Porin Ässät U20	U20 SM-liiga	21	3	6	9	31	—	—	—	—	—
2005–06	Porin Ässät U20	U20 SM-liiga	38	11	15	26	24	—	—	—	—	—
2005–06	Porin Ässät	SM-liiga	8	0	0	0	0	3	0	0	0	0
2006–07	Porin Ässät U20	U20 SM-liiga	13	5	5	10	6	—	—	—	—	—
2006–07	Porin Ässät	SM-liiga	47	4	4	8	6	—	—	—	—	—
2006–07	Suomi U20	Mestis	1	0	0	0	4	—	—	—	—	—
2007–08	Porin Ässät U20	U20 SM-liiga	25	14	9	23	8	12	4	1	5	0
2007–08	Porin Ässät	SM-liiga	29	0	4	4	2	—	—	—	—	—
2008–09	Porin Ässät	SM-liiga	56	4	5	9	28	—	—	—	—	—
2009–10	Porin Ässät U20	U20 SM-liiga	2	1	1	2	0	—	—	—	—	—
2009–10	Porin Ässät	SM-liiga	44	10	6	16	54	—	—	—	—	—
2010–11	Porin Ässät	SM-liiga	46	5	4	9	59	2	1	0	1	2
2011–12	Lukko	SM-liiga	36	3	7	10	18	—	—	—	—	—
2011–12	HIFK	SM-liiga	14	2	2	4	14	2	0	0	0	0
2012–13	Jokipojat	Mestis	10	4	3	7	4	—	—	—	—	—
2012–13	Ilves	SM-liiga	14	1	2	3	6	—	—	—	—	—
2013–14	Porin Ässät	Liiga	57	6	7	13	68	—	—	—	—	—
2014–15	Porin Ässät	Liiga	44	8	6	14	28	2	0	0	0	0
2015–16	KooKoo	Liiga	51	2	9	11	34	—	—	—	—	—
2016–17	Peliitat Heinola	Mestis	5	2	1	3	2	—	—	—	—	—
2016–17	Jokipojat	Mestis	16	6	2	8	16	3	1	0	1	25
2017–18	Kiekko-Vantaa	Mestis	3	0	3	3	2	—	—	—	—	—
2017–18	Porin Ässät	Liiga	16	0	2	2	10	1	0	0	0	0
2018–19	Porin Ässät	Liiga	52	5	2	7	20	—	—	—	—	—
2019–20	Karhu HT	Suomi-sarja	4	4	0	4	0	4	3	0	3	0
2020–21	Karhu HT	Suomi-sarja	2	2	1	3	0	4	2	2	4	2
SM-liiga totals			514	50	60	110	347	10	1	0	1	2
