= Nuto =

Nuto may refer to:

- Nuto Revelli, Italian author, historian and partisan
- Kasperi Nuto, Finnish ice hockey player
- Nuto, Mozambique, place in the Ancuabe District in Mozambique
