= Vuorisalo =

Vuorisalo is a Finnish surname. Notable people with the surname include:

- Olavi Vuorisalo (1933–2024), Finnish middle-distance runner
- Teemu Vuorisalo (born 1995), Finnish ice hockey player
