= Kasperi, Seinäjoki =

Kasperi
- District of Seinäjoki
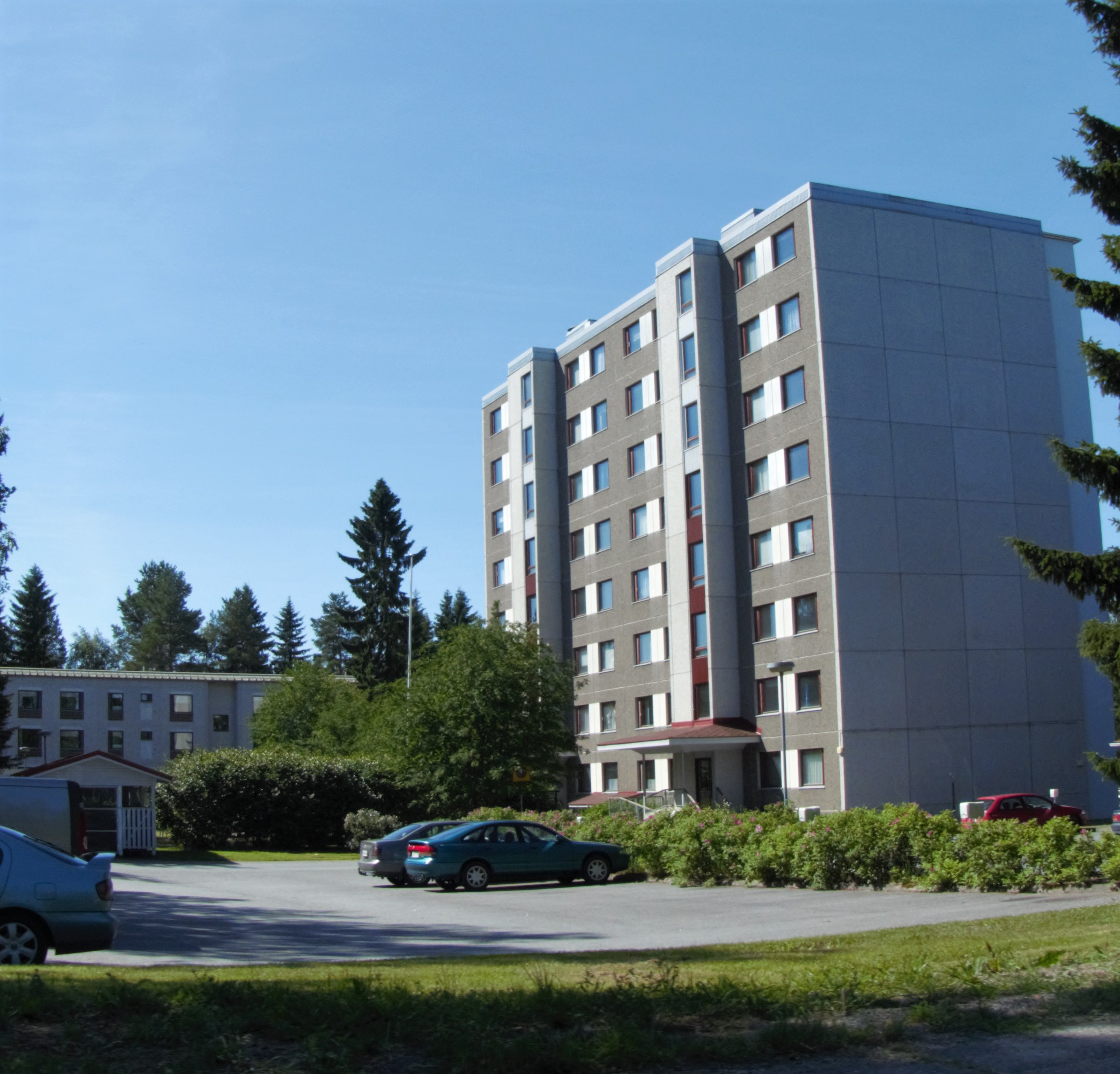
- Houses in Kasperi
- Coordinates: 62.770°N 22.877°E
- Country: Finland
- Region: Southern Ostrobothnia
- City: Seinäjoki

Population (2022)
  - Total: 3,759
- includes Hallilanvuori

Kasperi is a district of Seinäjoki, Finland. It is located about four kilometers to the southeast from the city center. Kasperi and its Hallilanvuori sub-district are a part of the Kasperi ward, which also includes eastern Kivistö.

Local services include primary education, a grocery store, a pub, and the Toimintojen Talo community center with a lunch restaurant and other services. In 2022, the population of the Kasperi district (including Hallilanvuori) was 3,759.

== History ==
Kasperi was mostly built during the 1970s and 1980s as part of the development of suburban housing estates (lähiö) in Finland. The designing of the neighborhood was inspired by the Tapiola district of Espoo. Kasperi was named after Kasperi Kustaa's farmhouse, which was located in the area and called Kasperi. In the 2000s, the Hallilanvuori residential area was built next to a mountain of the same name in southern Kasperi.

== Gallery ==
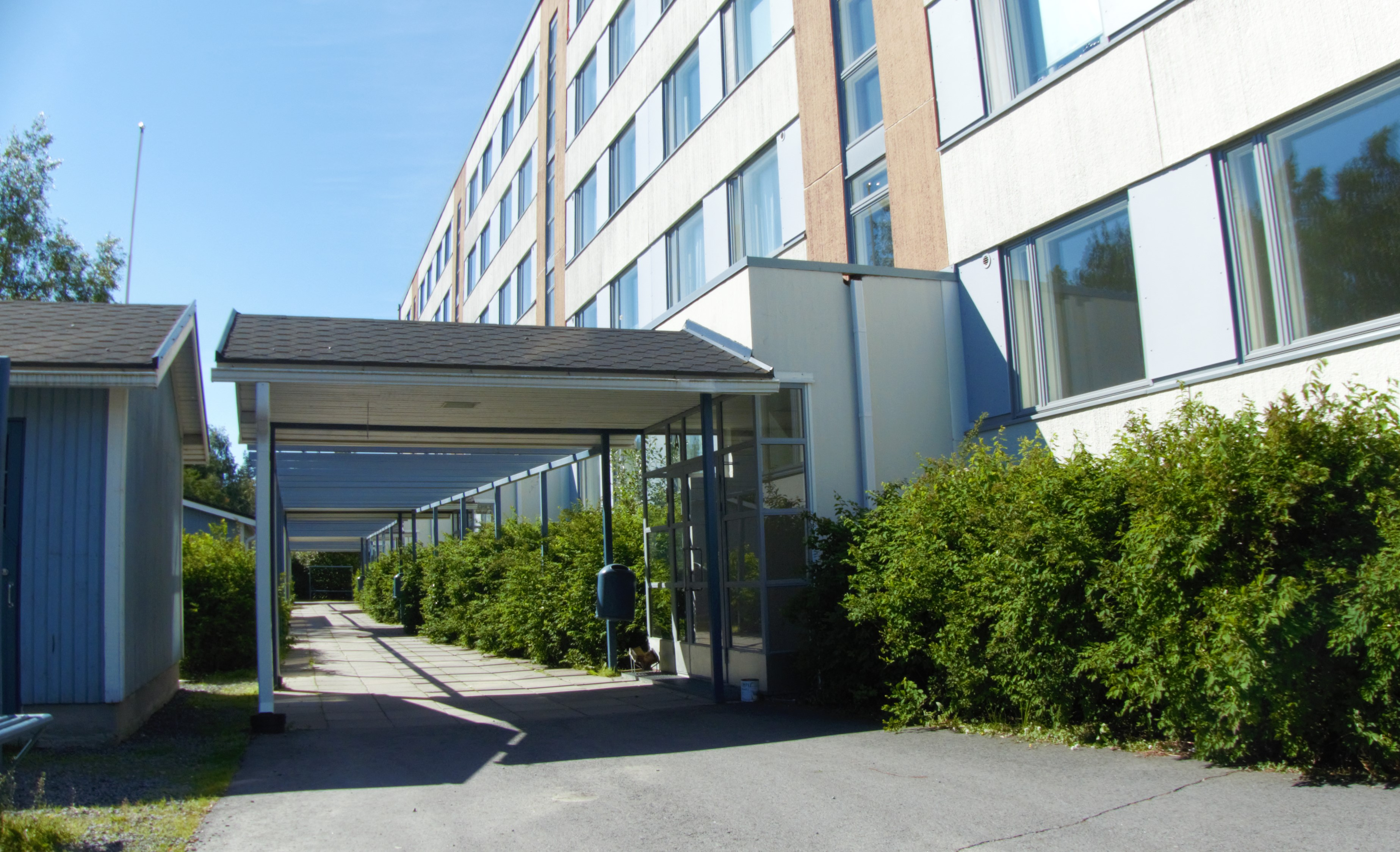
An apartment building on the street Tapiolantie.

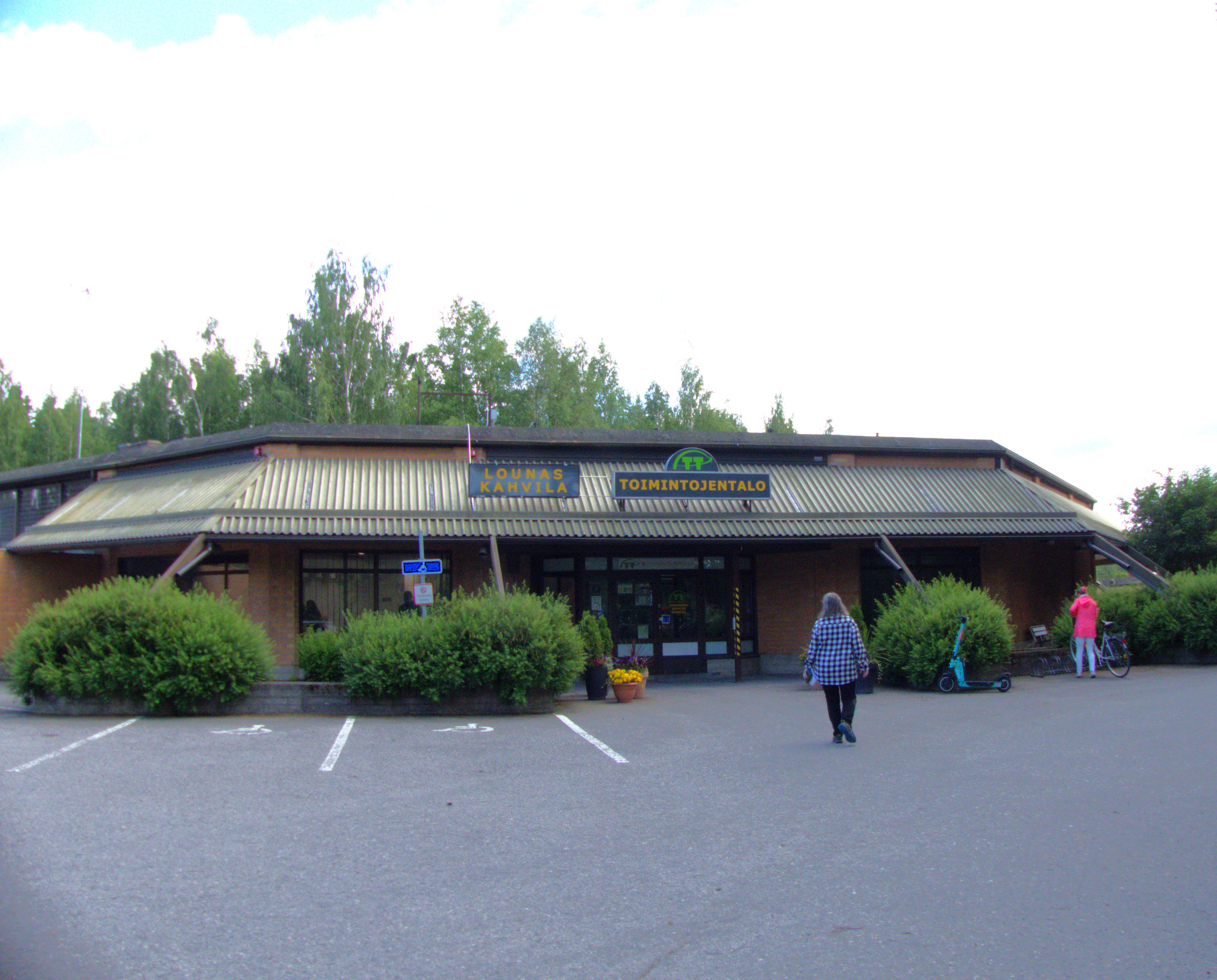
Toimintojen Talo, a local cafeteria with other services.

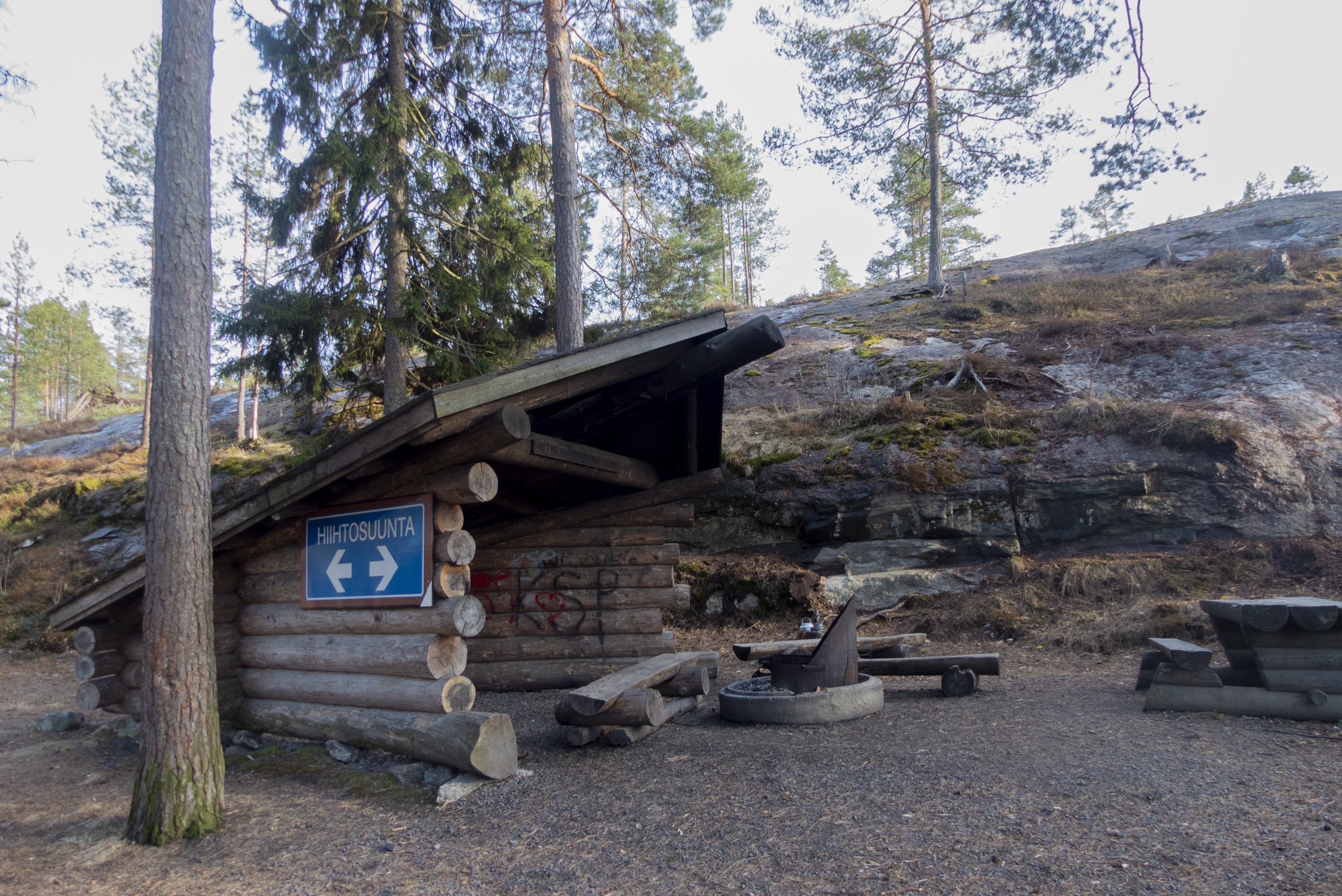
A laavu in Hallilanvuori.

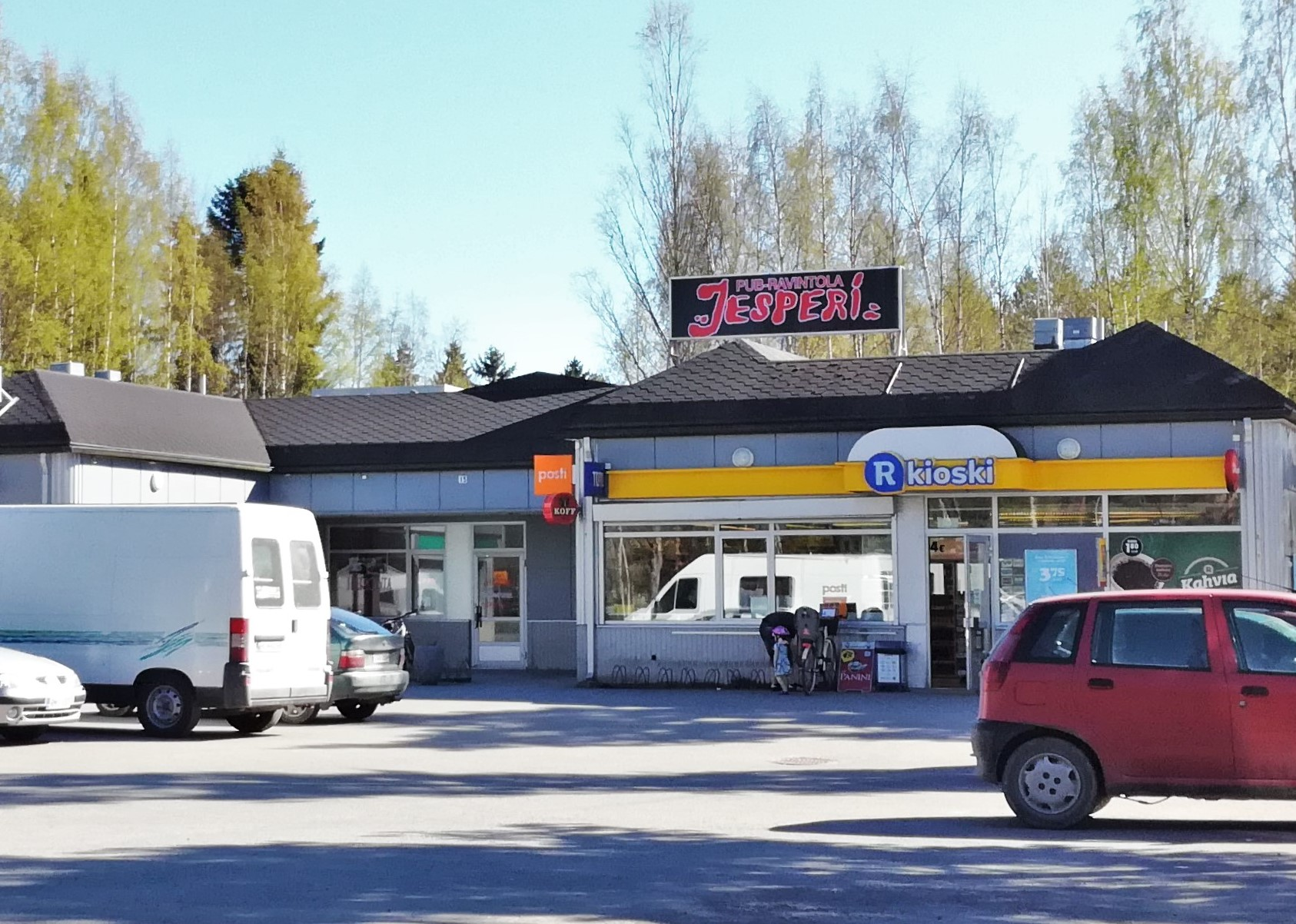
Local services.
