= Kivistö (Seinäjoki) =

- District of Seinäjoki
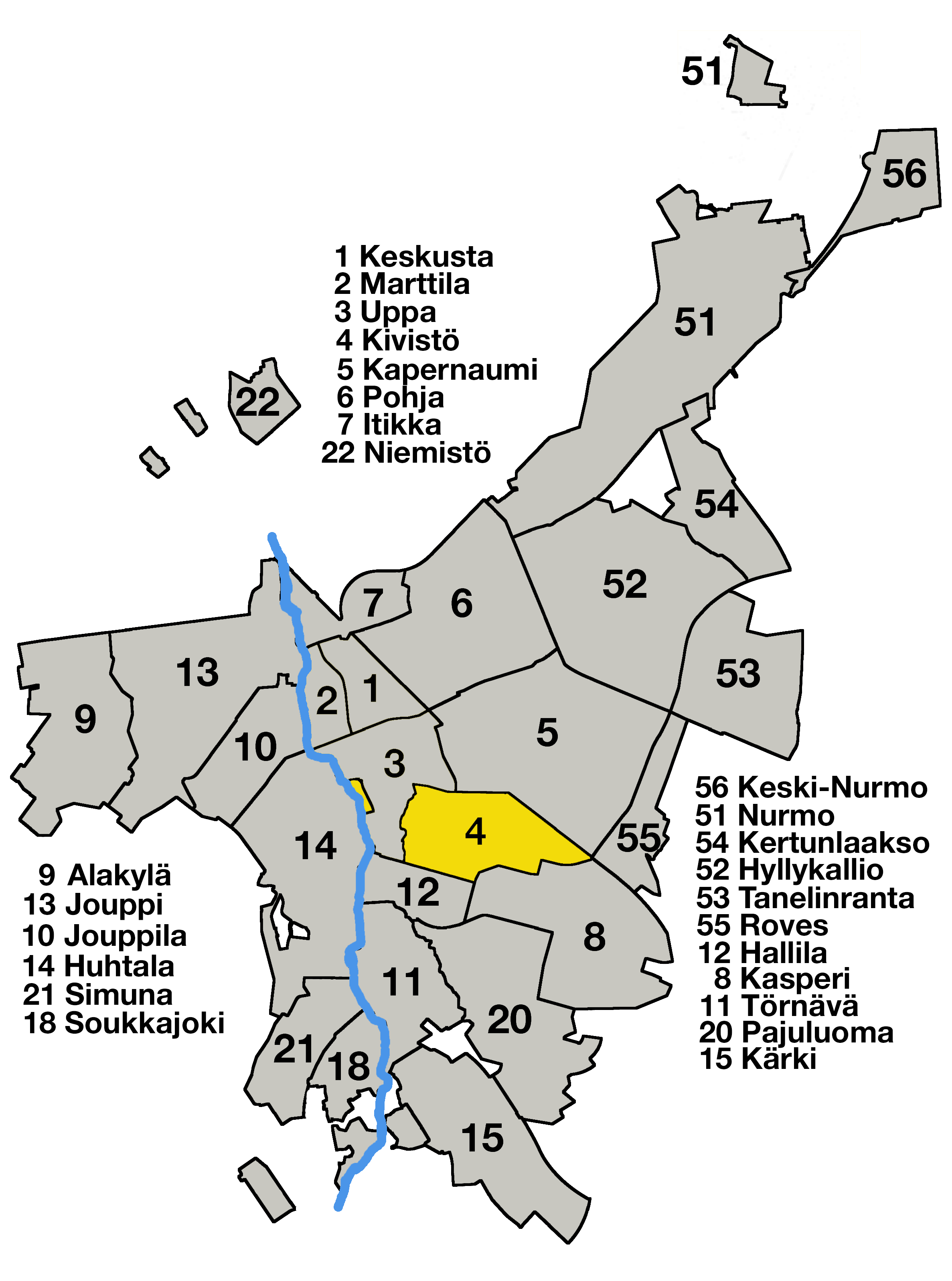
- Country: Finland
- Region: South Ostrobothnia
- City: Seinäjoki

Population (2022)
  - Total: 3 069

Kivistö is a district of Seinäjoki, Finland. It is located about three kilometers to the southeast from the city center. The population of Kivistö was 3,069 in 2022. The western Kivistö is a part of the Kantakaupunki ward and the eastern Kivistö is a part of the Kasperi ward. Local services include a school, a convenience store and a pub.

== Gallery ==
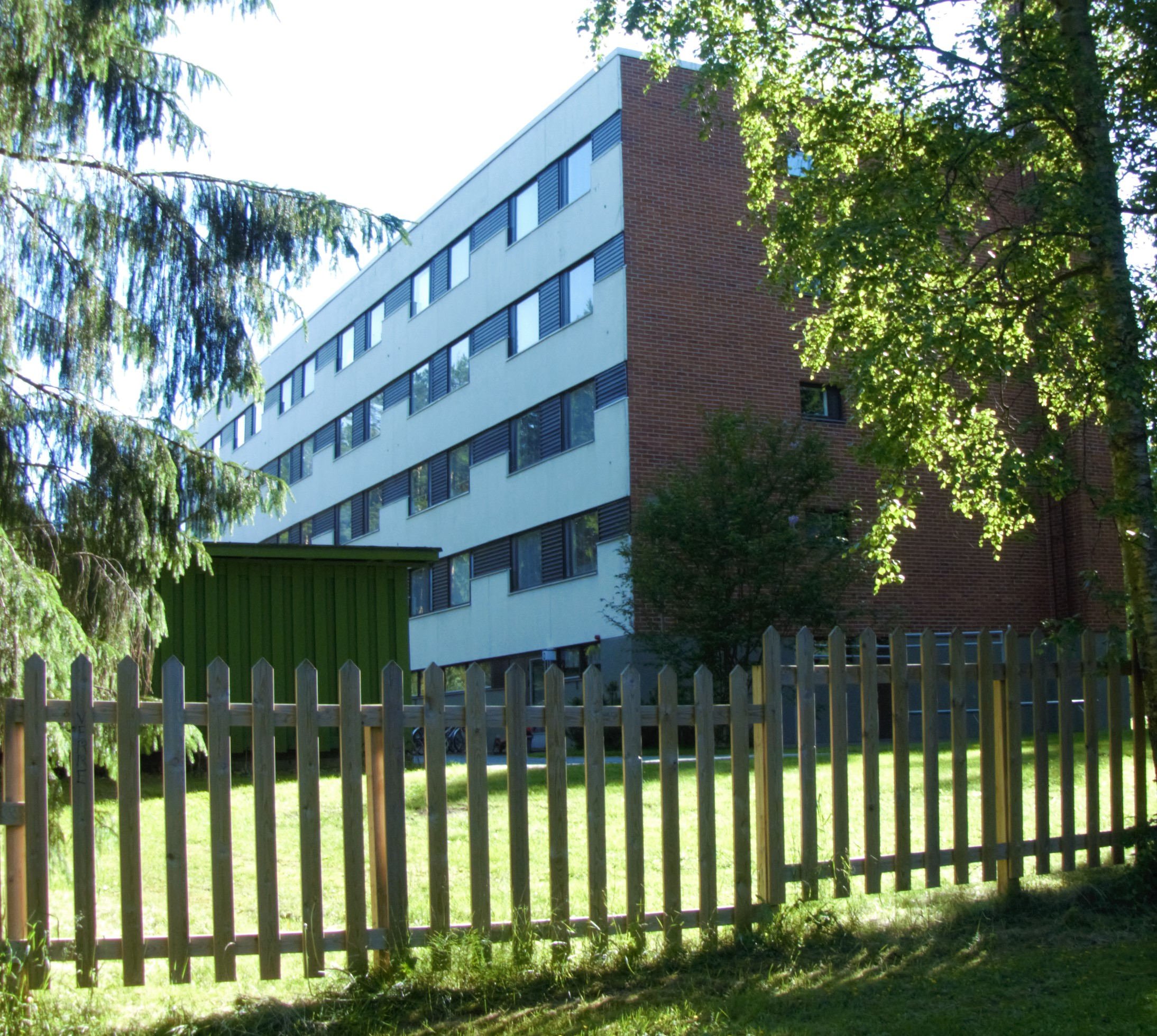
An apartment building built in the 1970s

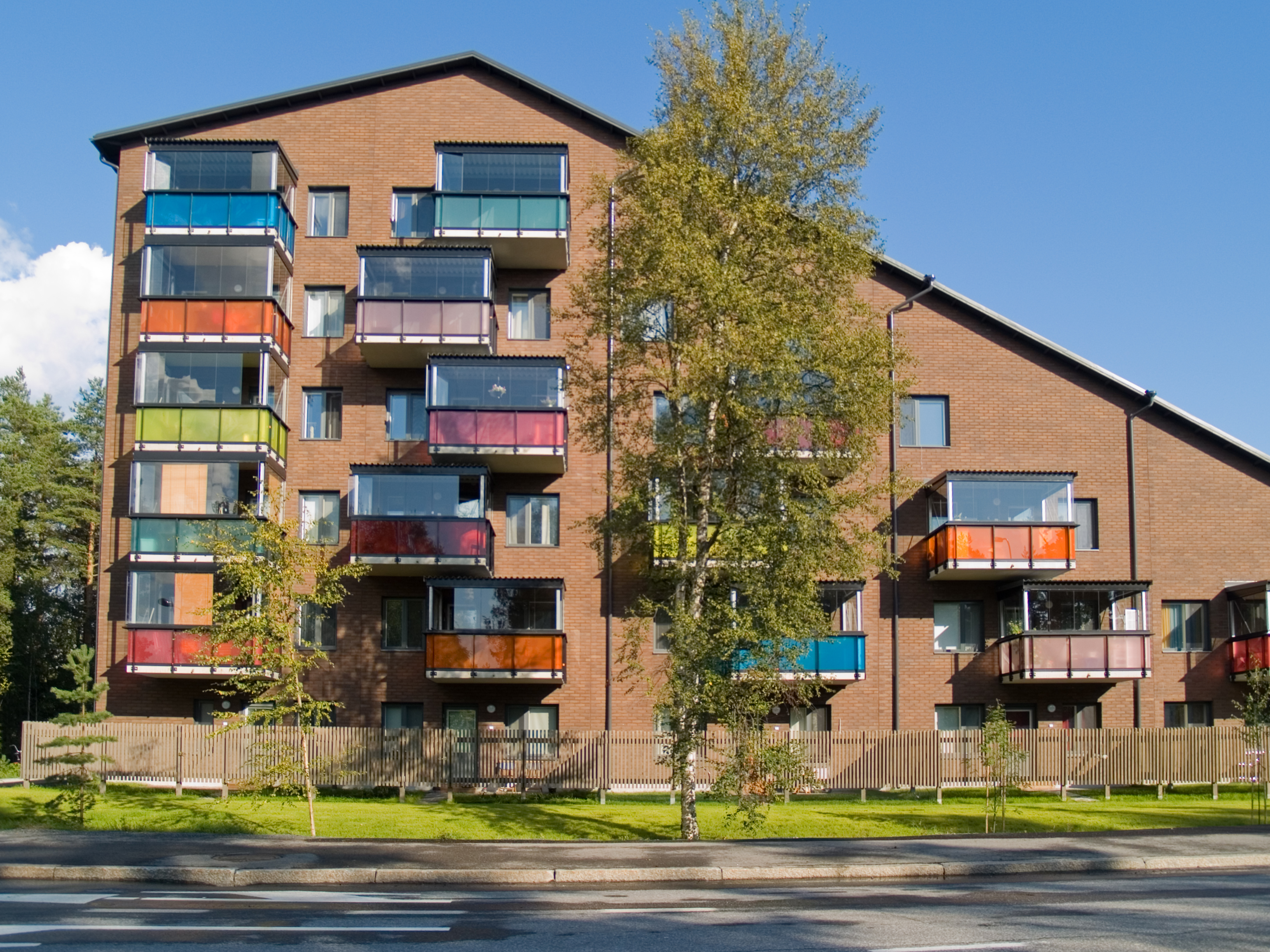
An apartment building built in the 2010s

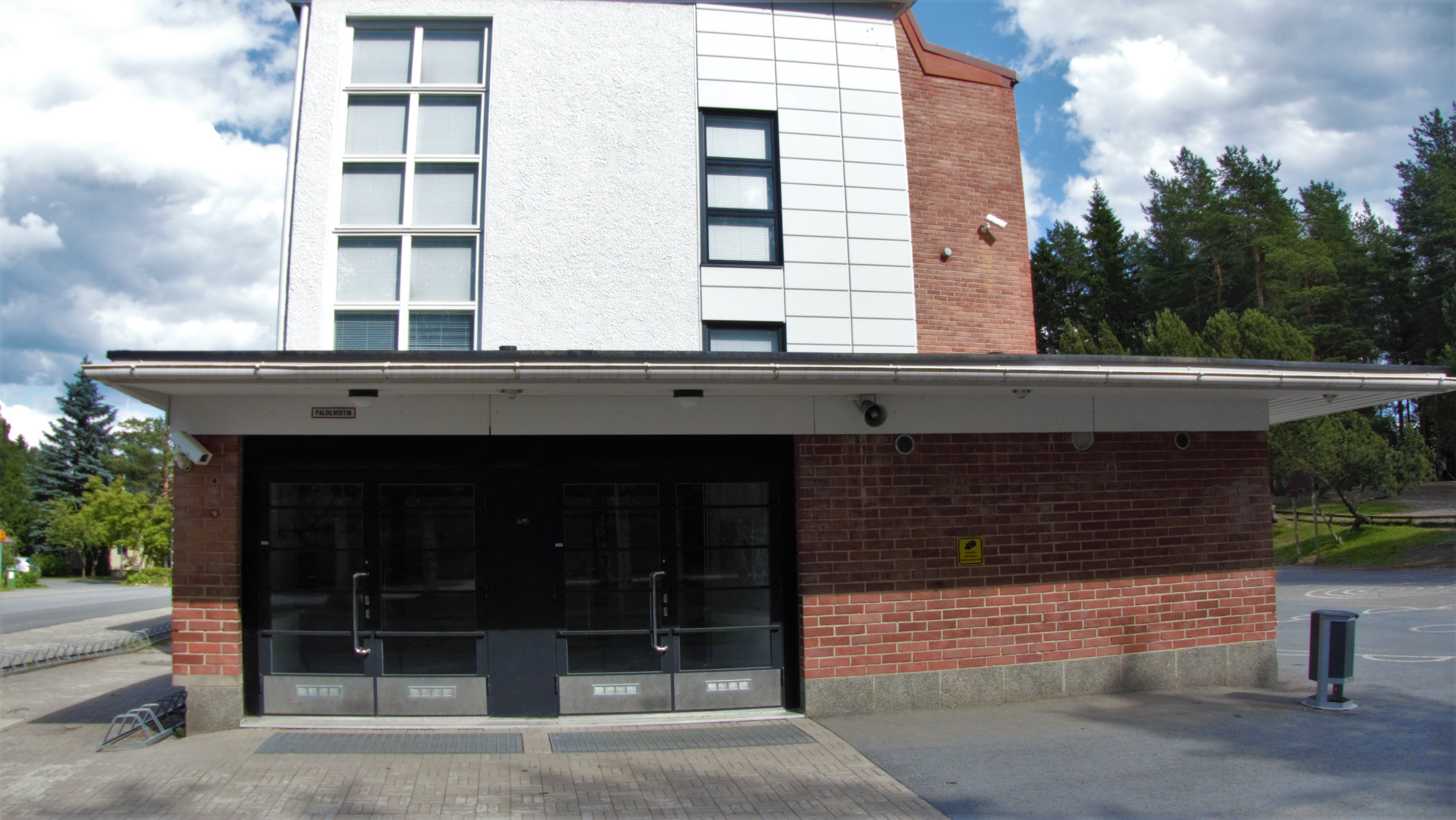
Kivistö school
