= Jesperi Kotkaniemi =

Finnish ice hockey player (born 2000)

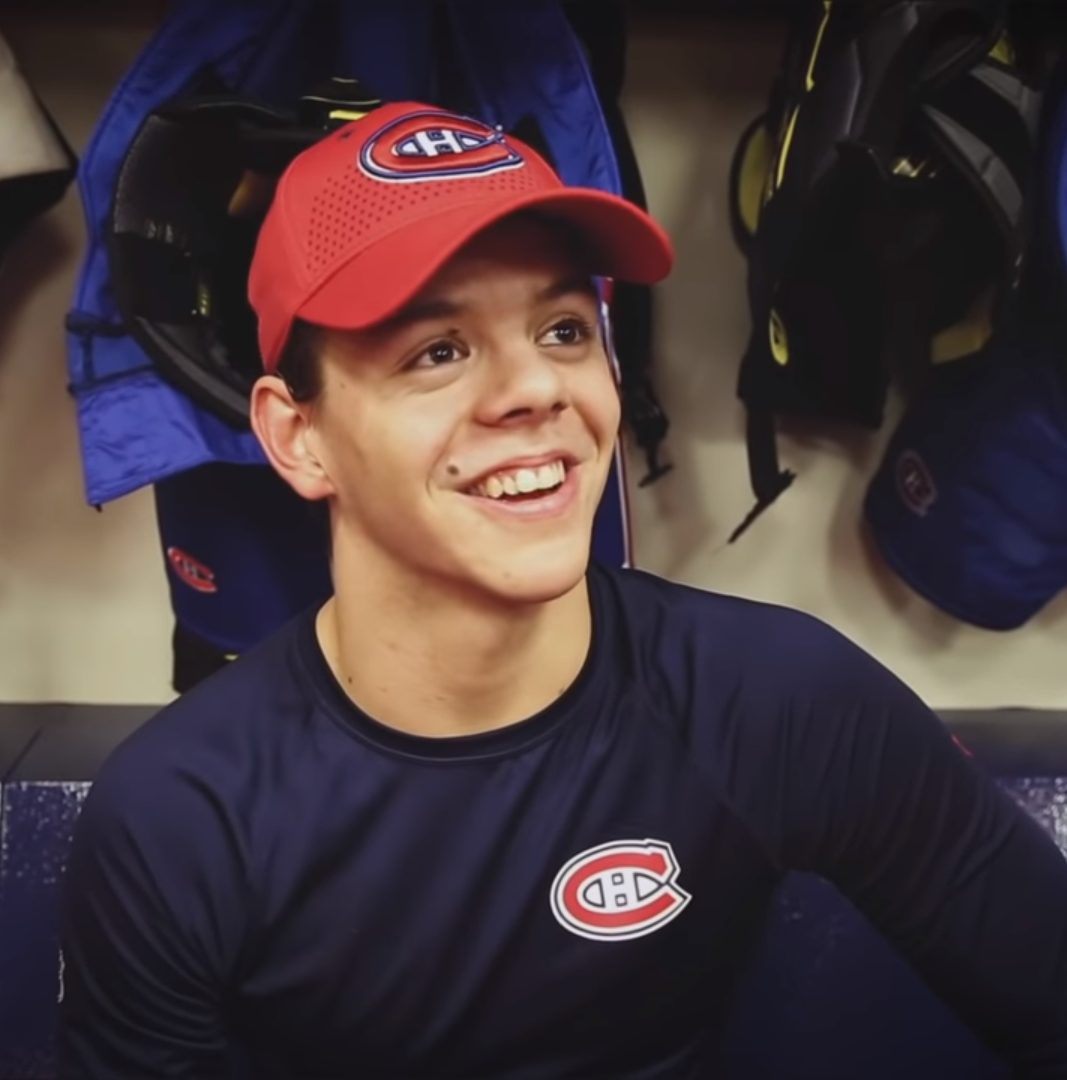
- Kotkaniemi in 2018
- Born: 6 July 2000 (age 26) Pori, Finland
- Height: 6 ft 3 in (191 cm)
- Weight: 212 lb (96 kg; 15 st 2 lb)
- Position: Centre
- Shoots: Left
- NHL team Former teams: Carolina Hurricanes; HC Ässät Pori; Montreal Canadiens
- NHL draft: 3rd overall, 2018; Montreal Canadiens
- Playing career: 2017–present

Jesperi Kotkaniemi (Finnish pronunciation: [ˈjesperi ˈkotkɑnie̯mi]; born 6 July 2000) is a Finnish professional ice hockey player who is a centre for the Carolina Hurricanes of the National Hockey League (NHL). He was selected third overall by the Montreal Canadiens in the 2018 NHL entry draft. In October 2018, he became the first player born in the 2000s to play in one of the major professional sports leagues in the United States and Canada, when he appeared on the Canadiens opening night roster. Kotkaniemi won the Stanley Cup with the Hurricanes in 2026.

== Playing career ==
=== HC Ässät Pori ===
Kotkaniemi's youth club is his hometown team HC Ässät Pori. In the 2014–15 season, he was his team's top point and goal scorer in the U16 SM-liiga with 33 points. Kotkaniemi played most of the 2015–16 season in HC Ässät's U20 team, aged just 15. He also played part of the season in both the U18 and U16 teams. Kotkaniemi suffered from injuries in the early 2016–17 season, and he played only 17 games in the U20 SM-sarja regular season, but scored 15 points. In the playoffs, Kotkaniemi scored five points in seven matches. He and his team achieved the U20 silver medal at the end of the season.

In June 2017, Kotkaniemi signed a three-year professional Liiga contract with HC Ässät. He played his first professional game at the age of 17 in the opening round of the 2017–18 season against Ilves Tampere. Kotkaniemi became the Liiga's first forward born in the 2000s and the fourth player overall. He was assigned to the left wing of the HC Ässät second line, alongside Antoine Laganière and Simon Suoranta. Kotkaniemi received 13.07 minutes of ice time in the game. He also scored his first career goal, which was the deciding goal in HC Ässät's 6–2 victory. Kotkaniemi became the Liiga first goal scorer born in the 2000s. He also received an assist on Antoine Laganière's goal. Tapio Sammalkangas selected Kotkaniemi as the third star of the match.

In total, Kotkaniemi scored 29 points in 57 regular season games during his rookie season and had one assist in seven playoff games. He was HC Ässät's second-best in assists and third-best scorer in the regular season. At the end of the season, Kotkaniemi was nominated for the Jarmo Wasama Memorial Trophy, given to the Liiga rookie of the year, but the award was ultimately won by Petrus Palmu of HC TPS.

=== Montreal Canadiens ===
On 22 June 2018, having been touted amongst the top players by the NHL Central Scouting service, Kotkaniemi was drafted third overall in the 2018 NHL entry draft by the Montreal Canadiens. After attending the club's development camp, he was signed to a three-year, entry-level contract on 2 July 2018.

On 3 October 2018, Kotkaniemi made his NHL debut against the Toronto Maple Leafs; he earned one assist in the loss. He thus became the first person born in the year 2000 to play in one of the Big Four professional sports leagues in North America. Kotkaniemi scored his first and second NHL goals on 1 November 2018 against the Washington Capitals. At 18 years, 118 days old, he became the second youngest goal scorer in Canadiens' history behind Mario Tremblay, who tallied his first goal at age 18 years, 75 days on 16 November 1974 against the New York Rangers at the Forum. Kotkaniemi added a second goal in the third period of the same game, tying the score at 4–4 en route to a 6–4 Montreal victory, and becoming the youngest player in NHL history not born in North America to score at least twice in one NHL game. He surpassed fellow Finn Patrik Laine, who, at 18 years, 183 days, recorded a hat trick for the Winnipeg Jets in a 5–4 win against the Toronto Maple Leafs on 19 October 2016. On 6 January 2019, during a game against the Nashville Predators, Kotkaniemi became the third Canadiens player to score 20 points before the age of 19. A month later on 5 February, Kotkaniemi set a new Canadiens record by becoming the first player to score goals in three straight games before the age of 19. He ultimately scored 34 points in 79 games in his rookie season.

After the season concluded, Kotkaniemi underwent knee surgery to repair a chronic minor injury. He scored his first goal of the 2019–20 season in Montreal's season opener, a 4–3 shootout loss against the Carolina Hurricanes. However, on 5 December 2019, he suffered a concussion in a game against the Colorado Avalanche, resulting in eight games lost. Kotkaniemi was reassigned to the Laval Rocket, the Canadiens' AHL affiliate, on 1 February 2020.

In October 2020, the Montreal Canadiens loaned Kotkaniemi to HC Ässät on a contract until the start of NHL training camp. He played ten games with HC Ässät, scoring eight points, after which it was announced in November that Kotkaniemi's loan contract had ended when the Canadiens invited him to Canada to prepare for the NHL season.

=== Carolina Hurricanes ===
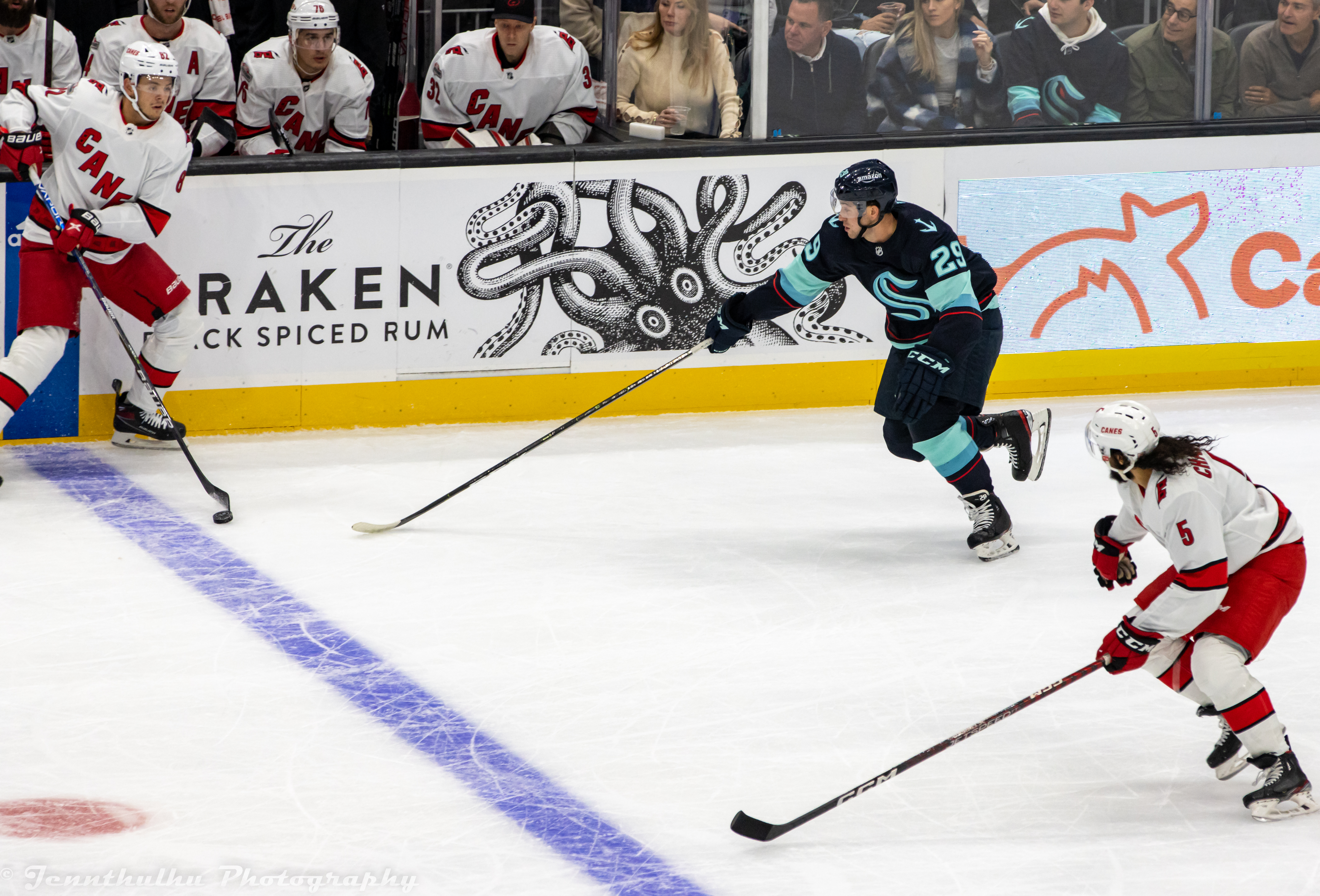
Kotkaniemi (left) in a game against the Seattle Kraken in 2022.

On 28 August 2021, Kotkaniemi signed a one-year, $6.1 million offer sheet with the Carolina Hurricanes. Seven days later, the Canadiens decided not to match the offer sheet, sending Kotkaniemi to Carolina with Montreal receiving their first and third-round picks in the 2022 NHL entry draft as compensation. Kotkaniemi was the first NHL player to be successfully acquired via offer sheet since Dustin Penner in 2007. The Kotkaniemi affair drew parallels to an offer sheet the Canadiens offered Hurricanes forward Sebastian Aho two years prior. Kotkaniemi's contract with the Hurricanes included a $20 signing bonus, a reference to the number Aho wears with Carolina, and statements issued by Hurricanes management poked fun at the Canadiens by being verbatim of statements issued by Montreal management after offer sheeting Aho.

On 21 March 2022, the Hurricanes and Kotkaniemi agreed to an eight-year, $38.5 million extension, worth an annual value of $4.82 million. Kotkaniemi and Carolina had been rumored to be inking a lengthy contract worth less than his offer sheet agreement since the initial deal was signed.

== International play ==
Medal record

Men's ice hockey

Representing Finland

World U18 Championships
Gold medal – first place	2018 Russia	
Silver medal – second place	2017 Slovakia	

Kotkaniemi made his junior international debut for Finland at the 2017 World U18 Championships in Slovakia, he amassed 6 points in 7 games to help claim a silver medal.

He returned for the following 2018 World U18 Championships in Russia, centering the top-line in recording 9 points in 7 tournament contests, helping Finland secure the gold medal over United States. He was also recognized as a top 3 on team Finland by the IIHF.

== Personal life ==
Kotkaniemi was raised in Pori, the son of Mikael and Kati Kotkaniemi. Mikael, a former professional hockey player and current coach, and native of Helsinki, settled in Pori after meeting Kati, a Pori area native, while he was playing for HC Ässät Pori. Kotkaniemi has one brother, Kasperi, who is sixteen months his senior and plays as a goaltender. Because the two brothers were so close in age, Jesperi would play with players in Kasperi's age group (1999 born). Mikael took a job as an assistant coach in Ässät's under-20 team in 2006, eventually working his way up to head coach of the men's team, which allowed Jesperi and Kasperi unlimited access to the club's facilities, so they spent most of their time on the ice as children.

Upon being drafted by the Canadiens, Kotkaniemi began studying French.

== Career statistics ==
=== Regular season and playoffs ===
			Regular season					Playoffs
Season	Team	League	GP	G	A	Pts	PIM	GP	G	A	Pts	PIM
2015–16	Ässät	FIN.2 U18	6	5	12	17	0	—	—	—	—	—
2015–16	Ässät	FIN U20	23	5	10	15	12	—	—	—	—	—
2016–17	Ässät	FIN U20	17	9	6	15	18	7	4	1	5	0
2017–18	Ässät	Liiga	57	10	19	29	20	7	0	1	1	6
2018–19	Montreal Canadiens	NHL	79	11	23	34	26	—	—	—	—	—
2019–20	Montreal Canadiens	NHL	36	6	2	8	23	10	4	0	4	23
2019–20	Laval Rocket	AHL	13	1	12	13	16	—	—	—	—	—
2020–21	Ässät	Liiga	10	2	6	8	8	—	—	—	—	—
2020–21	Montreal Canadiens	NHL	56	5	15	20	12	19	5	3	8	14
2021–22	Carolina Hurricanes	NHL	66	12	17	29	37	14	0	2	2	2
2022–23	Carolina Hurricanes	NHL	82	18	25	43	50	15	3	4	7	8
2023–24	Carolina Hurricanes	NHL	79	12	15	27	36	11	0	1	1	4
2024–25	Carolina Hurricanes	NHL	78	12	21	33	50	14	0	4	4	14
2025–26	Carolina Hurricanes	NHL	42	2	7	9	8	—	—	—	—	—
Liiga totals			67	12	25	37	28	7	0	1	1	6
NHL totals			518	78	125	203	242	83	12	14	26	65

=== International ===
Year	Team	Event	Result	GP	G	A	Pts	PIM
2017	Finland	WJC18	2nd place, silver medalist(s)	7	1	5	6	0
2017	Finland	IH18	6th	4	2	2	4	6
2018	Finland	WJC18	1st place, gold medalist(s)	7	3	6	9	37
Junior totals				18	6	13	19	43

== Awards and honours ==
Award	Year	Ref
NHL
Stanley Cup champion	2026	

Awards and achievements
Preceded by Ryan Poehling	Montreal Canadiens first-round draft pick 2018	Succeeded by Cole Caufield
