= Teemu Vuorisalo =

Finnish ice hockey player

- Born: 4 June 1995 (age 30) Pori, Finland
- Height: 5 ft 11 in (180 cm)
- Weight: 176 lb (80 kg; 12 st 8 lb)
- Position: Defence
- Shoots: Right
- Suomi-sarja team Former teams: Karhu HT; Ässät Pori; Lillehammer IK
- NHL draft: Undrafted
- Playing career: 2014–present

Teemu Vuorisalo (born 3 February 1995) is a Finnish ice hockey defenceman. He is currently playing with Karhu HT in the Finnish Suomi-sarja.

Vuorisalo made his Liiga debut playing with Ässät during the 2014–15 Liiga season.
