= Kasperi Torikka =

Finnish ice hockey player

- Born: April 8, 1999 (age 27) Ristiina, Finland
- Height: 5 ft 10 in (178 cm)
- Weight: 170 lb (77 kg; 12 st 2 lb)
- Position: Defence
- Shoots: Left
- Liiga team: SaiPa
- Playing career: 2016–present

Kasperi Torikka (born April 8, 1999) is a Finnish professional ice hockey defenceman currently playing for SaiPa of the Finnish Liiga.

Torikka made his Liiga debut for SaiPa during the 2016-17 Liiga season where he played three games during the regular season. In the 2018–19 season, Torikka had loan spells with Mestis teams Ketterä and SaPKo.

== Career statistics ==
			Regular season					Playoffs
Season	Team	League	GP	G	A	Pts	PIM	GP	G	A	Pts	PIM
2016–17	SaiPa	Jr. A	43	4	10	14	16	-	-	-	-	-
2016–17	SaiPa	Liiga	4	0	0	0	0	-	-	-	-	-
2017–18	SaiPa	Jr. A	39	3	22	25	12	-	-	-	-	-
2017–18	SaiPa	Liiga	3	0	0	0	22	-	-	-	-	-
2018–19	SaiPa	Jr. A	11	0	5	5	4	-	-	-	-	-
2018–19	SaiPa	Liiga	28	0	1	1	12	-	-	-	-	-
2018–19	Ketterä	Mestis	10	1	4	5	2	-	-	-	-	-
2018–19	SaPKo	Mestis	4	2	0	2	2	-	-	-	-	-
Liiga totals			35	0	1	1	14	-	-	-	-	-
