= Porin Karhu HT =

Ice hockey team in Pori, Finland

- City: Pori
- League: None
- Founded: 2000
- Folded: 2022
- Home arena: Isomäki Areena (capacity: 6 350)
- Colours
- Owner(s): Karhu Hockey Team ry
- Affiliates: Porin Ässät (SML); KK-V (Fin-5)
- Farm club(s): Karhu HT II (defunct)
- Website: http://www.karhuht.com/

Championships
- Suomi-sarja: 1: 2020–21

Porin Karhu Hockey Team, also known as Karhu HT (abbreviated KHT) was an ice hockey team in Pori, Finland.

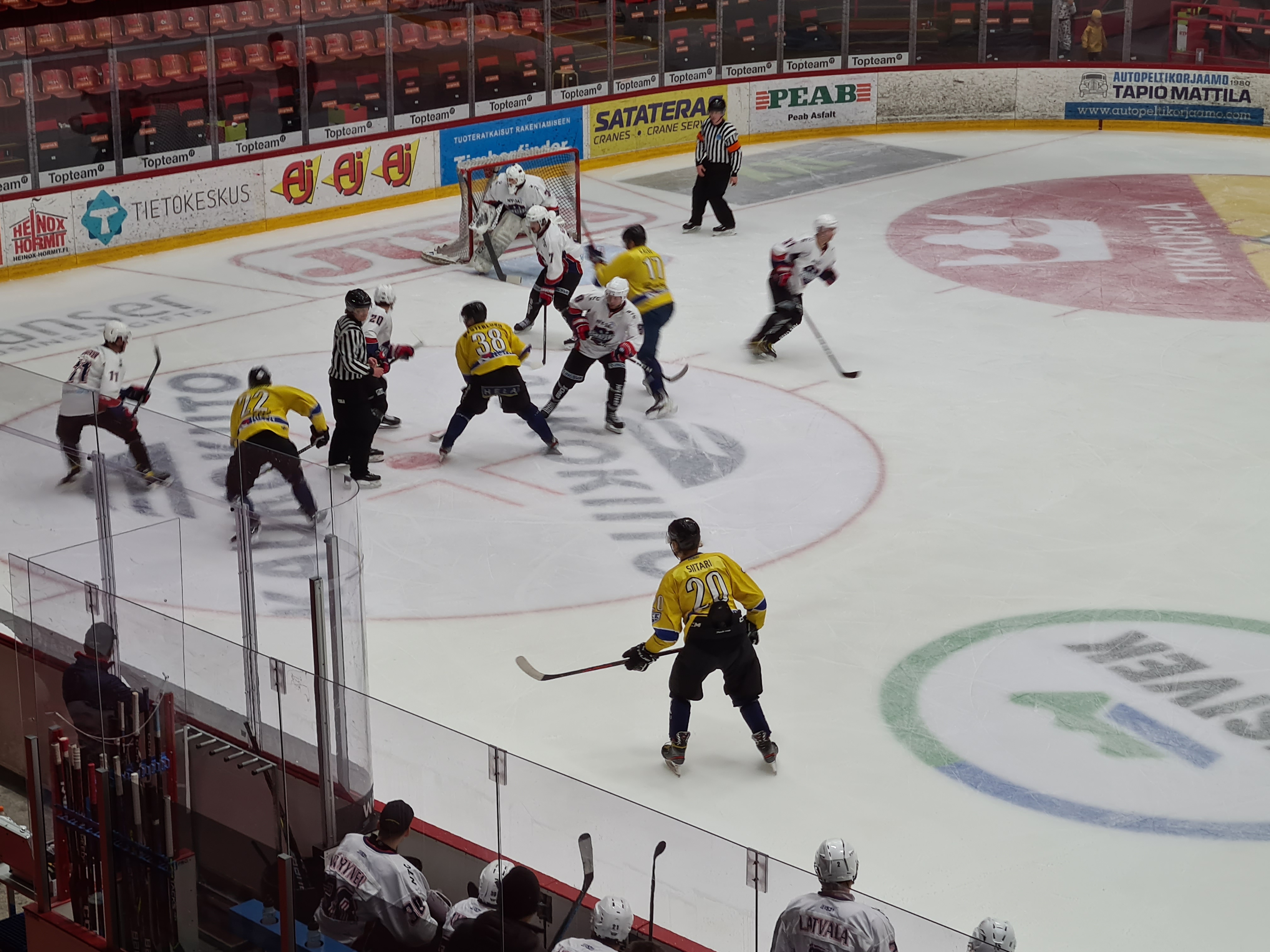
Karhu HT playing against Muik Hockey in 2022

== History ==
Karhu HT's 2011–2012 season in the 2nd Division went well. KHT finished 1st in their division with 25 points and went to the Suomi-sarja qualification playoffs. Karhu HT didn't succeed in getting promoted to Suomi-sarja though.

Karhu HT got promoted to Suomi-sarja after the 2014–15 season.

In its first Suomi-sarja season, Karhu HT finished third in the regular season but got swept by JHT Kalajoki in the first round of the playoffs. Karhu HT's goalie, Niklas Lehti, had the second best save percentage in the league, of the players who played at least a third of the games.

Karhu HT finished fifth in the 2020–21 regular season. KHT beat Haukat in the finals after two games. This was Karhu HT's first Suomi-sarja championship. Karhu HT's player budget was estimated to be 35 000€ by Satakunnan Kansa.

In 2022, Karhu HT gave up their spot in Suomi-sarja after they had gotten 0 points in 13 games.

== League history ==
Leagues Karhu HT has played in:

- 4. divisioona (2000–2001)
- 2. divisioona (2007–2015)
- Suomi-sarja (2015–2022)

== Logo history ==
Karhu HT's logo from 2007 to 2014

Karhu HT's logo from 2014 to 2019

The current logo of Karhu HT was used from 2000 to 2007 and was taken into use again in 2019. Karhu HT also uses the logo of KK-V, since their hockey teams merged in 2018 when KK-V gave up their spot on the 2. divisioona.

== Franchise records ==
These are the top five-point-scorers in franchise history. Figures are updated after each completed season.

- * – current Karhu HT player

Note: Pos = Position; GP = Games Played; G = Goals; A = Assists; Pts = Points

Points
Player	Pos	GP	G	A	Pts
Kasperi Nuto	F	142	72	119	191
Mika Takanen	F	156	74	113	187
Lasse Salminen	F	160	72	100	172
Eetu Majalahti	F	100	67	83	150
Henri Peltola	F	71	33	92	125

== Notable players ==
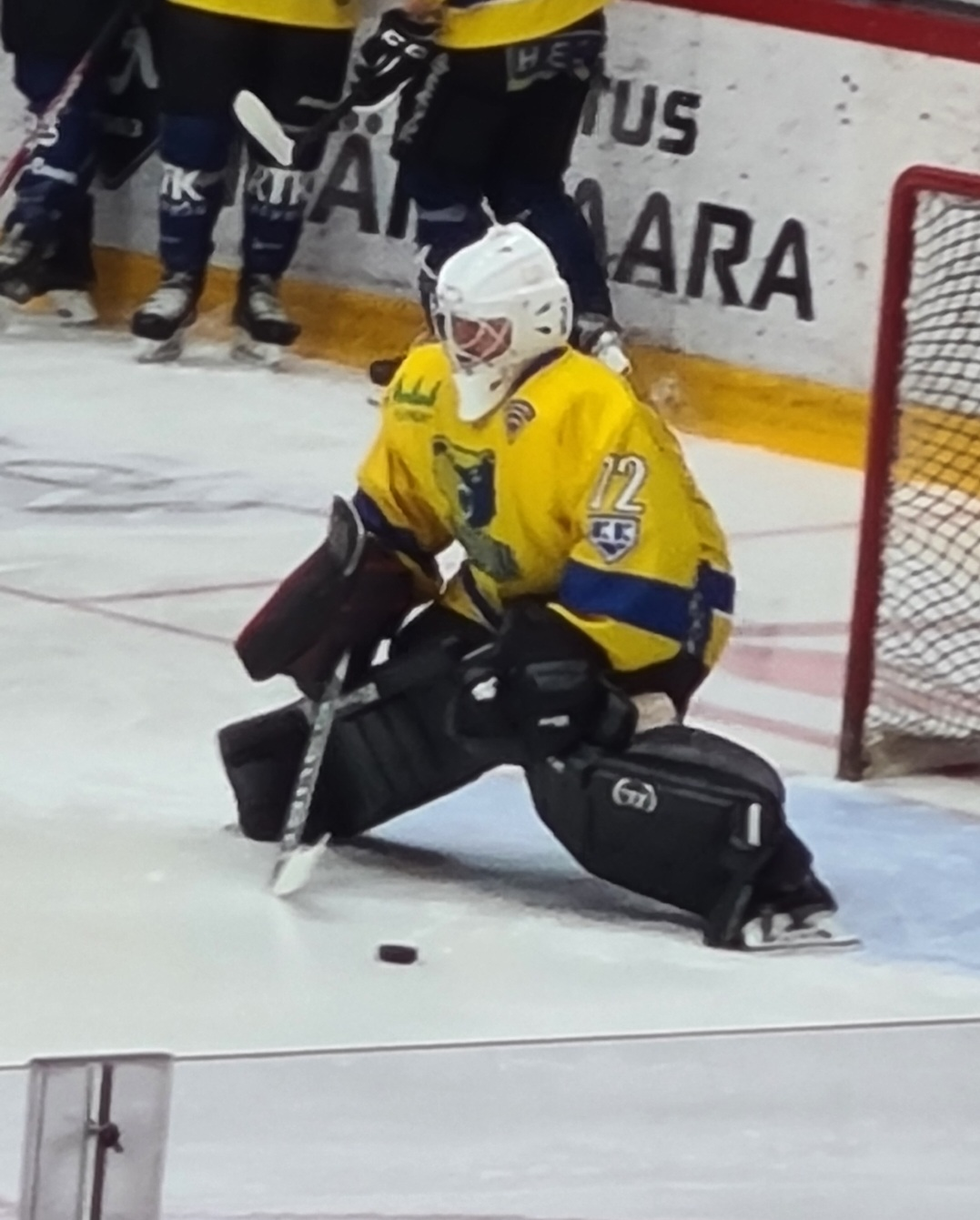
Kasperi Kotkaniemi with the Karhu HT

- Teemu Vuorisalo (2019 Suomen cup, 2022)
- Kasperi Nuto (2017-2022)
- Kasperi Kotkaniemi (2020-21, 2022)
- Julius Harttunen (2019-2022)
- Atte Valli (2015-2022)

== Other sports ==
Karhu HT hasn't had any teams in other sports than ice hockey, but Karhu HT and MuSa, a local football club, have hosted football tournaments and other events together.
