= Kasperi Nuto =

Finnish Ice hockey player

- Born: August 31, 1995 (age 30) Lieksa, Finland
- Height: 177 cm (5 ft 10 in)
- Weight: 77 kg (170 lb; 12 st 2 lb)
- Position: Right wing
- Shoots: Left
- Suomi-sarja team Former teams: Karhu HT; Porin Ässät; Kokkolan Hermes; TUTO; KeuPa HT
- Playing career: 2015–present

Kasperi Nuto (born: 31 August 1995) is a Finnish ice hockey player that currently serves as the captain of Karhu HT. Nuto plays as a winger. Nuto has played 11 Liiga games with Porin Ässät and has one point. Nuto has played for three different Mestis teams and in total has played 17 Mestis games with 3 points. Nuto has played in Karhu HT since 2017.

== Football career ==
In addition to hockey, Nuto has played football. He won silver with Musan Salama D13 team in the Denmark Soccer Festival -tournament in 2008.
