= Kasperi Kotkaniemi =

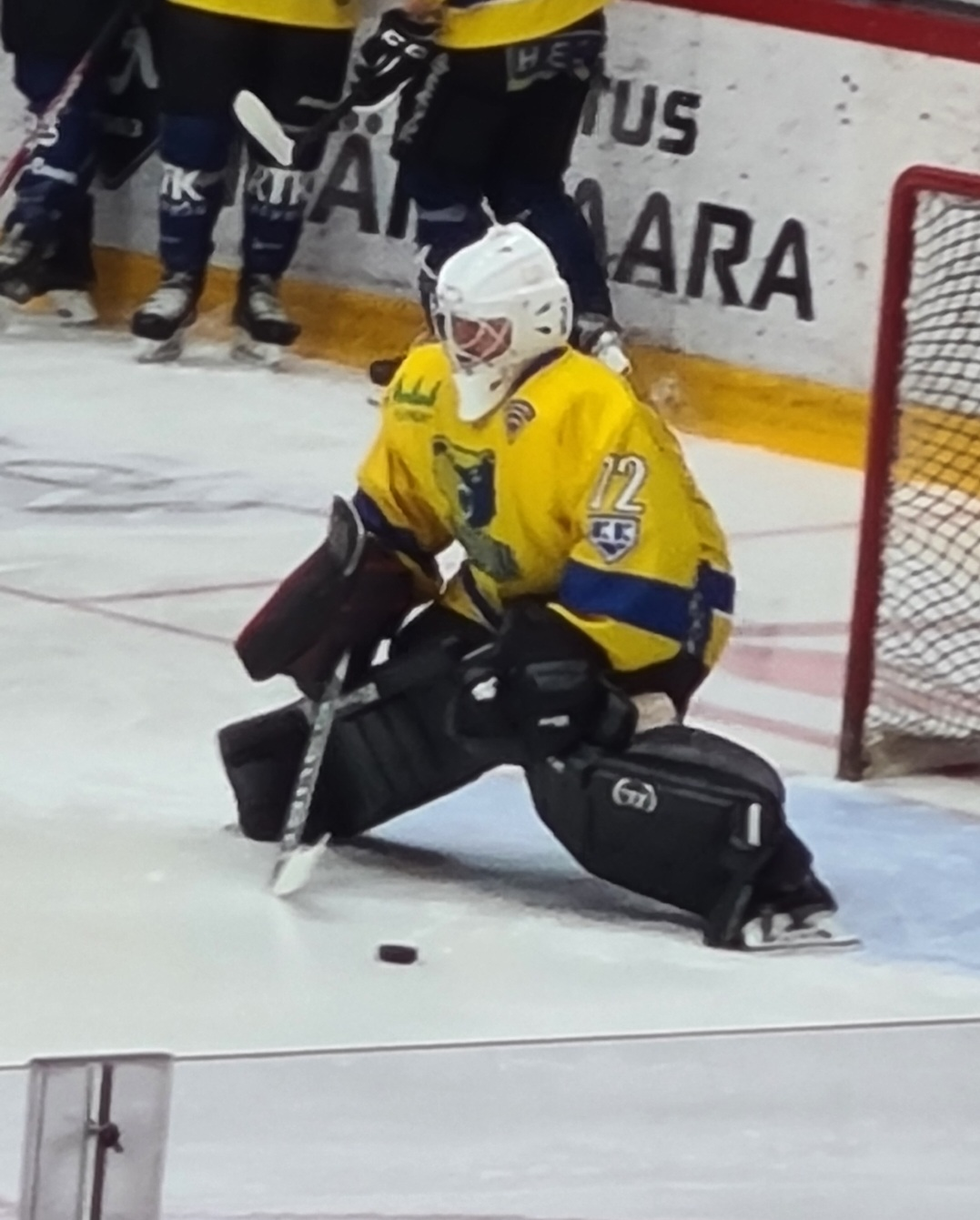
- Born: March 2, 1999 (age 27) Pori, Satakunta, Finland
- Height: 177 cm (5 ft 10 in)
- Weight: 79 kg (174 lb; 12 st 6 lb)
- Position: Goaltender
- Catches: Left
- Karhu HT team Former teams: Porin Karhu HT; Porin Ässät; Jokipojat; JHT Kalajoki
- Playing career: 2018–present

Kasperi Kotkaniemi (born March 2, 1999) is a Finnish ice hockey goaltender for Karhu HT of the Suomi-sarja.

Kotkaniemi has played seven games in the top-tier league of Finland, Liiga, for Porin Ässät.

== Personal life ==
Kotkaniemi's younger brother Jesperi plays as a forward in the organization of the NHL club Carolina Hurricanes and he is the Montreal Canadiens first round third draft pick from 2018. The brothers' father, Mikael Kotkaniemi, played more than 200 SM-liiga games in his own career as a forward, and he later served as the head coach of the Ässät for three seasons in 2016 and 2018. Today, Mikael works as the head coach of Lukko's U20 team. The brothers' grandfather is television and theater director Pentti Kotkaniemi and grandmother actress Kirsti Wallasvaara. Pentti's daughter, Mikael's half-sister and the brothers' aunt is actress Saara Kotkaniemi, who is married to musician, singer-songwriter and actor Olavi Uusivirta.
