= List of islands of Connecticut =

This is a list of islands of Connecticut. The list does not include named minor rock outcroppings, former islands that are now connected to the mainland by landfill, or false islands that are connected by thin slivers of land to the mainland. Unless otherwise indicated, listed islands are in Long Island Sound.

Name	Town	Coordinates	Notes
Andrews Island	Branford	41°15′48″N 72°45′57″W	
Andrews Island	Stonington	41°20′00″N 71°57′21″W	Within the Fishers Island Sound
Ball Island	New Haven	41°18′27″N 72°54′25″W	Mill River
Barn Island	Stonington	41°19′46″N 71°52′06″W	
Barton Island	Griswold	41°33′29″N 71°53′53″W	Pachaug Pond
Bear Island	Branford	41°15′29″N 72°44′21″W	Part of Thimble Islands
Beers Island	Branford	41°15′25″N 72°44′38″W	Part of Thimble Islands
Belden Island	Branford	41°15′47″N 72°45′42″W	
Betts Island	Norwalk	41°04′13″N 73°23′29″W	Part of Norwalk Islands
Bluff Island	Greenwich	41°00′38″N 73°35′55″W	
Bowers Island	Greenwich	40°59′45″N 73°38′04″W	
Brockway Island	Essex	41°22′24″N 72°22′35″W	Connecticut River
Burr Island	Branford	41°15′48″N 72°45′17″W	
Calf Islands	Greenwich	40°59′30″N 73°38′23″W	
Calf Pasture Island	Norwalk	41°04′57″N 73°23′01″W	Part of Norwalk Islands
Calves Island	Old Lyme	41°19′35″N 72°20′41″W	Connecticut River
Candlewood Isle	New Fairfield	41°28′52″N 73°27′15″W	Candlewood Lake
Canfield Island	Norwalk/Westport	41°05′49″N 73°22′58″W	
Carting Island	Stratford	41°12′48″N 73°06′47″W	Housatonic River
Cat Island	Branford	41°15′15″N 72°44′20″W	Part of Thimble Islands
Cedar Hammock	Norwalk	41°04′10″N 73°25′04″W	
Cedar Island	Branford	41°15′30″N 72°45′39″W	
Cedar Island	Brookfield	41°31′43″N 73°26′31″W	New Milford Bay
Cedar Island	Clinton	41°15′56″N 72°31′33″W	Connected to mainland by landfill
Charles Island	Milford	41°11′27″N 73°03′17″W	Connected by sandbar to mainland during low tide.
Chauncey Island	Ridgefield	41°19′22″N 73°30′21″W	Lake Naraneka
Chimon Island	Norwalk	41°03′57″N 73°23′30″W	Part of Norwalk Islands
Clam Island	Branford	41°14′51″N 72°48′54″W	
Clown Island	Torrington	41°46′07″N 73°06′44″W	
Cockenoe Island	Westport	41°05′01″N 73°21′18″W	Part of Norwalk Islands
Copps Island	Norwalk	41°03′31″N 73°23′13″W	Part of Norwalk Islands; Connected by sandbar to Crow Island
Cove Island	Stamford	41°02′50″N 73°30′03″W	
Crab Island	Darien	41°03′01″N 73°27′41″W	
Crow Island	Norwalk	41°03′40″N 73°23′26″W	Part of Norwalk Islands; Connected by sandbar to Chimon Island and Copps Island
Curatole Island	New Hartford	41°52′46″N 73°02′37″W	West Hill Pond
Cut in Two Island	Branford	41°15′30″N 72°44′45″W	Part of Thimble Islands
Cuties Island (Vincent Island)	Stamford	41°02′08″N 73°30′36″W	Also a ghost town.
Davis Island	Branford	41°15′20″N 72°44′44″W	Part of Thimble Islands
Deer Island	Sherman	41°32′14″N 73°27′50″W	Candlewood Lake
Deer Island	Litchfield	41°41′48″N 73°13′42″W	Bantam Lake
Diving Island	Greenwich	41°00′48″N 73°35′58″W	
Dodges Island	Stonington	41°19′44″N 71°57′15″W	Within the Fishers Island Sound
Dog Island	Norwalk	41°03′30″N 73°24′35″W	Part of Norwalk Islands
Dogfish Island	Branford	41°15′25″N 72°44′49″W	Part of Thimble Islands
Duck Island	Westbrook	41°15′22″N 72°28′30″W	
Duck Island	Milford	41°10′27″N 73°06′30″W	Charles E. Wheeler Wildlife Management Area
Dunks Island	Old Saybrook	41°16′48″N 72°22′54″W	Wetlands off Plum Back River
East Crib	Branford	41°15′11″N 72°45′12″W	Part of Thimble Islands
East Stooping Bush Island	Branford	41°15′04″N 72°44′50″W	Part of Thimble Islands
Elihu Island	Stonington	41°20′12″N 71°53′14″W	
Enders Island	Stonington	41°19′20″N 71°57′46″W	
Eustasia Island	Lyme	41°23′32″N 72°25′13″W	Connecticut River
Fairbanks Island	Darien	41°03′25″N 73°27′54″W	Scott Cove
Falkner Island	Guilford	41°12′41″N 72°39′18″W	
Fayerweather Island	Bridgeport	41°8′35″N 73°12′58″W	Long Island Sound near Black Rock Harbor.
Fish Islands	Darien	41°02′54″N 73°27′26″W	
Foskett Island	Guilford	41°15′29″N 72°42′40″W	
Fowler Island	Milford	41°14′13″N 73°06′08″W	Housatonic River
Fox Island	Lebanon	41°38′23″N 72°18′27″W	Williams Pond
Frisbie Island	Branford	41°15′46″N 72°45′18″W	
Gates Island	Groton	41°18′55″N 71°58′01″W	
Gildersleeve Island	Portland	41°36′21″N 72°36′52″W	Connecticut River
Goat Island	Stonington	41°20′27″N 71°53′07″W	
Goodyear Island	New Milford/Bridgewater	41°32′16″N 73°24′15″W	Lake Lillinonah (Housatonic River)
Goose Island	Greenwich	41°01′00″N 73°35′57″W	
Goose Island	Stratford	41°11′39″N 73°07′01″W	Housatonic River
Goose Island	Old Lyme	41°20′10″N 72°20′56″W	Connecticut River
Goose Island	Westport	41°04′18″N 73°22′17″W	Part of Norwalk Islands
Gorham Island	Westport	41°08′38″N 73°21′47″W	Saugatuck River
Governor Island	Branford	41°15′17″N 72°45′21″W	Part of Thimble Islands
Governors Island	Hampton	41°47′30″N 72°05′03″W	Pine Acres Lake
Grannis Island	New Haven		Quinnipiac River
Grass Island	Stamford	41°01′35″N 73°32′22″W	
Grassy Island	Norwalk/Westport	41°04′13″N 73°23′00″W	Part of Norwalk Islands
Great Captain Island	Greenwich	40°58′56″N 73°37′43″W	
Great Island	Old Lyme	41°17′17″N 72°19′56″W	
Green Island	Branford	41°15′19″N 72°50′35″W	
Green Island	Sherman	41°32′53″N 73°28′07″W	Candlewood Lake
Greenaway Island (Caritas Island)	Stamford	41°02′12″N 73°30′20″W	
Greenwich Island	Greenwich	41°00′44″N 73°34′37″W	
Griswold Island	East Lyme	41°17′40″N 72°13′27″W	
Haddam Island	Haddam	41°29′30″N 72°31′05″W	Connecticut River
Hall Island	Stonington	41°19′39″N 71°51′04″W	Pawcatuck River
Hen Island	Branford	41°15′14″N 72°44′48″W	Part of Thimble Islands
High Island	Branford	41°14′57″N 72°45′28″W	Part of Thimble Islands
Hobs Island	Groton	41°19′19″N 72°04′33″W	Thames River
Holly Hock Island	Norwich	41°31′39″N 72°05′11″W	Yantic River
Horse Island	Greenwich	41°00′50″N 73°36′17″W	
Horse Island	Branford	41°14′40″N 72°45′27″W	Part of Thimble Islands
Horse Island	Guilford	41°15′28″N 72°42′23″W	
Hoyt Island	Norwalk	41°04′26″N 73°25′09″W	
Huntley Island	East Lyme	41°17′50″N 72°13′26″W	
Inner White Top	Guilford	41°15′30″N 72°40′13″W	
Jack Island	Stamford	41°01′51″N 73°32′08″W	
Johnson Island	Branford	41°14′49″N 72°44′58″W	Part of Thimble Islands
Kelsey Island	Branford	41°15′00″N 72°51′11″W	
Kings Island	Enfield/Suffield	41°57′17″N 72°36′45″W	Connecticut River
Kitts Island	Westport	41°06′23″N 73°22′04″W	
L'Hammock Island	Norwalk	41°03′17″N 73°24′30″W	Part of Norwalk Islands
Lewis Island	Branford	41°15′50″N 72°45′48″W	
Little Captain Island	Greenwich	40°59′19″N 73°36′41″W	
Little Hammock Island	Norwalk	41°03′15″N 73°24′14″W	Part of Norwalk Islands
Little Tavern Island	Norwalk	41°03′47″N 73°25′11″W	Part of Norwalk Islands
Long Island	Stratford	41°13′05″N 73°06′48″W	Housatonic River
Lord Island	East Haddam	41°26′10″N 72°27′04″W	Connecticut River
Lovers Island	Branford	41°15′17″N 72°49′52″W	
Lyddy Island	Groton	41°19′53″N 71°56′47″W	Within the Fishers Island Sound
Major Island	Stonington	41°21′36″N 71°50′18″W	Pawcatuck River
Marine Island	Branford	41°14′50″N 72°45′02″W	Part of Thimble Islands
Marvin Island	Old Lyme	41°17′58″N 72°20′13″W	Connecticut River
Mason's Island	Stonington	41°19′58″N 71°58′01″W	
Menunketesuck Island	Westbrook	41°15′51″N 72°27′51″W	
Mine Island	Meriden	41°33′23″N 72°49′37″W	Merimere Reservoir
Minnie Island	Montville	41°30′21″N 72°13′19″W	Gardner Lake
Money Island	Branford	41°14′58″N 72°45′06″W	Part of the Thimble Islands
Mouse Island	Groton	41°18′54″N 71°59′29″W	
Ned Island	Darien	41°02′51″N 73°28′33″W	
Nells Island	Milford	41°11′05″N 73°06′58″W	Charles E. Wheeler Wildlife Management Area
North Brother	East Lyme	41°17′34″N 72°14′41″W	
Nott Island	Old Lyme	41°21′00″N 72°22′21″W	Connecticut River
Oak Island	New Milford	41°31′33″N 73°26′32″W	Candlewood Lake
Outer Island	Branford	41°14′31″N 72°45′37″W	Part of Thimble Islands
Paquabaug	Roxbury	41°33′25″N 73°19′49″W	Shepaug River
Peach Island	Norwalk	41°04′58″N 73°24′19″W	In Norwalk Harbor
Peacock Island	Stratford	41°12′43″N 73°06′55″W	Housatonic River
Peagscomsuck Island	Canterbury	41°40′25″N 71°57′11″W	Quinebaug River
Pelican Island	Greenwich	41°00′31″N 73°35′05″W	
Pine Island	Groton	41°18′48″N 72°03′30″W	
Pine Island	New Fairfield	41°28′20″N 73°26′44″W	Candlewood Lake
Pope's Flat	Stratford	41°13′10″N 73°06′37″W	Housatonic River
Pot Island	Branford	41°14′53″N 72°45′17″W	Part of Thimble Islands
Potato Island	Branford	41°15′23″N 72°45′29″W	Part of Thimble Islands
Powder Island	New London	41°20′24″N 72°05′32″W	Thames River
Ram Island	Stonington	41°18′48″N 71°58′44″W	
Rat Island	Lyme	41°21′15″N 72°21′40″W	Connecticut River
Rich Island	Greenwich	41°00′11″N 73°38′38″W	
Rich Island	East Haddam	41°26′20″N 72°27′07″W	Connecticut River
Rock Island	Stonington	41°19′50″N 71°56′04″W	
Rock Island	Bridgewater	41°31′26″N 73°26′16″W	Candlewood Lake
Rogers Island	Branford	41°15′33″N 72°45′46″W	Part of Thimble Islands
Saint Helena Island	Branford	41°15′50″N 72°46′15″W	
Salt Island	Westbrook	41°16′31″N 72°26′30″W	
Sandy Hammock	Norwalk	41°03′49″N 73°24′27″W	Part of Norwalk Islands
Sandy Point	Stonington	41°19′52″N 71°53′47″W	Extends into Rhode Island
Scraggy Island	East Hampton	41°35′59″N 72°30′11″W	Pocotopaug Lake
Sedge Island	Branford	41°14′54″N 72°48′39″W	
Shea Island	Norwalk	41°03′36″N 73°24′08″W	Part of Norwalk Islands
Sheffield Island	Norwalk	41°03′05″N 73°24′58″W	Part of Norwalk Islands
Sherwood Island	Westport	41°06′53″N 73°19′51″W	
Shore Island	Greenwich	41°00′00″N 73°38′38″W	
Sixpenny Island	Groton	41°20′03″N 71°58′49″W	
Smith Island	Branford	41°15′20″N 72°44′23″W	Part of Thimble Islands
South Brother	East Lyme	41°17′22″N 72°14′22″W	
Spectacle Island	Branford	41°14′45″N 72°48′15″W	
Sprite Island	Westport	41°05′23″N 73°22′52″W	
Stone Island	Clinton	41°15′13″N 72°30′47″W	
Stony Island	East Haven	41°14′24″N 72°51′48″W	
Sumac Island	Branford	41°14′48″N 72°48′35″W	
Tavern Island	Norwalk	41°03′38″N 73°25′16″W	Part of Norwalk Islands
Thatchbed Island	Essex	41°20′47″N 72°23′00″W	Connecticut River
The Plans	Norwalk	41°03′10″N 73°24′17″W	Part of Norwalk Islands; Connected by sandbar to Shea and Sheffield islands
Thistle Island	Sherman	41°33′26″N 73°28′50″W	Candlewood Lake
Tree Hammock	Norwalk	41°03′52″N 73°24′18″W	Part of Norwalk Islands
Tree Island (Unofficial Name)	Wolcott	41° 38' 18" N 72° 57' 56" W	Cedar Lake
Turks Island	East Windsor	41°53′41″N 72°37′13″W	Connecticut River
Tuxis Island	Madison	41°15′57″N 72°36′06″W	
Tweed Island	Greenwich	41°00′31″N 73°36′58″W	
Twin Islands	East Hampton	41°35′37″N 72°30′15″W	Pocotopaug Lake
Twotree Island	Waterford	41°17′40″N 72°09′09″W	
Umbrella Island	Branford	41°14′59″N 72°50′31″W	
Walden Island	Preston	41°28′07″N 72°04′04″W	Thames River
Waterford Island	East Lyme	41°18′57″N 72°10′42″W	
Watts Island	East Lyme	41°17′56″N 72°13′13″W	
Wayland Island	Branford	41°15′12″N 72°44′38″W	Part of Thimble Islands
Wee Captain Island	Greenwich	40°59′25″N 73°36′32″W	
West Crib	Branford	41°15′06″N 72°45′18″W	Part of Thimble Islands
Wheeler Island	Branford	41°15′35″N 72°45′09″W	
Wilcox Island	Middletown; Portland; Cromwell	41°34′29″N 72°38′56″W	Connecticut River
Wilson Head	Greenwich	41°00′01″N 73°38′25″W	
Wintergreen Island	Winchester	41°54′29″N 73°05′41″W	Highland Lake
Wood Island	Norwalk	41°03′23″N 73°24′18″W	Part of Norwalk Islands
Wooster Island	Orange	41°16′50″N 73°04′58″W	Housatonic River
