= Goose Island (Guilford) =

Island in New Haven County, Connecticut, United States

Coordinates: 41°12′31″N 72°40′20″W

Goose Island is a small, uninhabited rocky island (technically an islet) off of the coast of Connecticut, in Long Island Sound. It belongs to the town of Guilford. It is near Falkner Island, North Rocks, Falkner Island Reef, Stony Island, and Three Quarters Rock. Goose Island has eroded to the point that it is 0.5 acre and virtually underwater at high tide, although it was once about 4 acres in size. The strait between the two islands is between 16 and 8 feet deep. The coastline is defined prominently by two small bays that connect during high tide.

The island is currently privately owned, but may someday become part of the Stewart B. McKinney National Wildlife Refuge.

== Shipwrecks ==
In 1805, a gale storm caused a ship to crash on the island, killing the crew of seven men. They were found and buried by Joseph Griffing, keeper of the lighthouse on Falkner.

During the time that Captain Oliver N. Brooks owned Falkner Light, there were at least 100 shipwrecks on Goose Island. Brooks saved 71 sailors.

In 1858, a coal schooner named Moses F. Webb crashed on the island. The crew of five was saved by Brooks. He later was given a medal, silver set, salary raise, and was nicknamed the "Hero of 1858".

A 1913 Hartford Courant article said of Webb, "He kissed his wife and babies good-by and made Goose Island all right, though he never expected to go back alive."

== Flora and fauna ==
Due to the circumstances, there are few plants and animals that are permanent residents. Those that do are mostly hardy plants, algae, and lichens. The island was named for the many birds, particularly geese, that often roost here.

Other birds found here include herring gulls, roseate terns, great black-backed gulls, and double-crested cormorants.

There is a patch of saltmarsh cordgrass.

As with many islands in Long Island Sound, seals can be seen basking here in the cooler months.

== See also ==
- Falkner Island
- Thimble Islands
- Outer Lands
