= Falkner Island =

Island in the United States of America

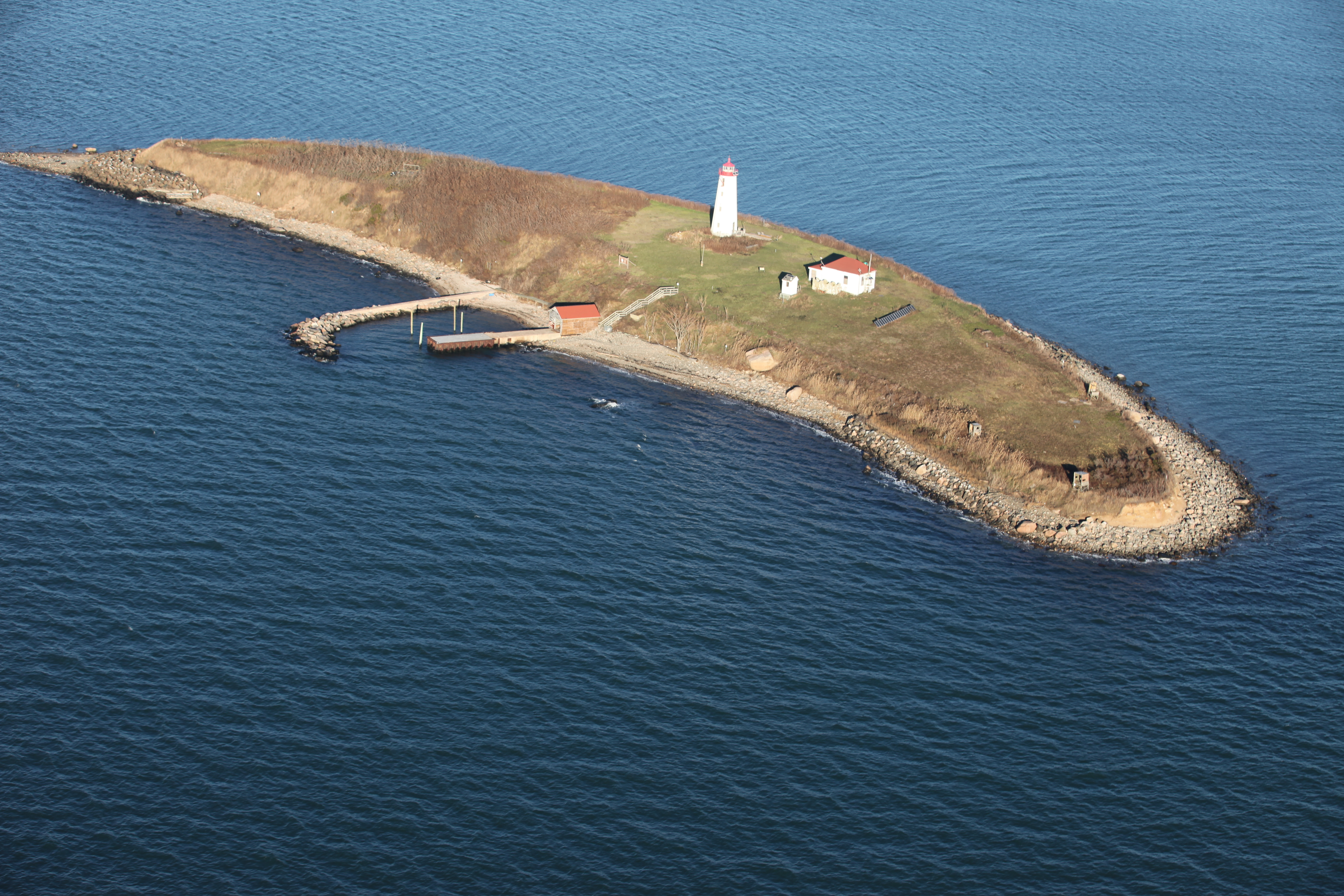
- Aerial view after Hurricane Sandy

- Location within Connecticut

Geography
- Location: Long Island Sound
- Coordinates: 41°12′39″N 72°39′11″W
- Area: 2.87 acres (1.16 ha)

Administration
- United States
- State: Connecticut
- County: New Haven
- City: Guilford

Demographics
- Population: 0

Falkner Island (also called Faulkner's Island) is a 2.87-acre (1.16 ha) crescent-shaped island located in Long Island Sound 3 miles (5 km) off Guilford, Connecticut, United States. The island has been visited by the Native Americans for thousands of years. Its Quinnipiac name is "Massancummock", meaning "the place of the great fish hawks". In 1641, Henry Whitfield and the founders of Guilford purchased the island from the Mohegan tribe's sachem, Uncas, as part of a transaction for the land east of East River. Purchased by the Stone family in 1715, it remained in the family until it was sold to the government in 1801.

The Falkner Island Light was constructed in 1802 and commissioned by President Thomas Jefferson. The light is the second oldest in Connecticut and is listed on the National Register of Historic Places. The lighthouse was automated in 1978, and continues to operate as a navigational aid to the nearby Intracoastal Waterway. The island is part of the Stewart B. McKinney National Wildlife Refuge and has the fifth-largest colony of nesting roseate terns in the northeastern United States. Much of the island's land mass has been lost to erosion, down to about 2.87 acres (11,600 m^{2}) from its original 4.5 acres (18,000 m^{2}). The United States Army Corps of Engineers reinforced the eastern boundary to slow the advancing deterioration.

== Name origins ==
The first recorded name of the Falkner Island was coined by the Native Americans. The island name in Quinnipiac was "Massancummock" meaning "the place of the great fish hawks". The Quinnipiac name did not refer to possession, but instead the usage or resources of the island.

The identity of the first European explorer is unknown, but it was likely the Dutch explorer Adrian Block who sailed through Long Island Sound around 1614. The United States government credits Block as the discoverer. Early English settlers called it "Falcon Island", likely stemming from the Native American name. Helander writes that the island was probably named for the osprey, but the English translation to "Falcon" suggesting the presence of the peregrine falcon was one of "simple ignorance". The island's name on Dutch maps was "Valcken Eylandt". The name later evolved to Faulkner Island, perhaps as a result of the Faulkner family who lived on the island in the 1700s. When the island was transferred to the U.S. government in 1801, the deed states the name as "Faulkners". The U.S. Board on Geographic Names changed and established "Falkner Island" as its name in 1891. However, the name change is not universally recognized and "popular usage" and the Faulkner's Light Brigade that conserves the island's lighthouse use "Faulkner"; including publications.

== History ==
Falkner Island has been the site of human activity for thousands of years. An archaeological survey performed on the island from 1997-1998 found a quartz projectile point of the Squibnocket triangle variety which dates to 1000-3000 B.C. The study was conducted by the U.S. Army Corps of Engineers and the U.S. Fish and Wildlife Service as part of the erosion control project; it was required by law under the National Historic Preservation Act because the island is on the National Register of Historic Places. The findings were published in the Bulletin of the Archaeological Society of Connecticut in 2001. In 1994, John P. Menta's The History of the Quinnipiac Indians identifies Falkner Island as the site of ceremonial and religious practices, but that these practices are still unknown. According to Bruchac's Thirteen Moons on Turtle's Back the island was not a permanent settlement, but was likely used for fishing and hunting trips in the summer.

European contact occurred in the first half of the 1600s. A map in the possession of Reverend Henry Whitfield from a 1639 deed shows the island and the Quinnipiac name of "Massancummock". In 1641, Whitfield and the founders of Guilford purchased the island from the Mohegan tribe's sachem, Uncas, as part of a transaction for the land east of East River. Uncas acquired the land when he married the daughter of the Hammonassett sachem, Sebequanash. At some point in the 1600s, Andrew Leete was an owner of the island. In 1715, Caleb and Ebenezer Stone purchased the island and it remained in the Stone family until 1801. In 1800, Noah Stone sold it to a distant relative named Medad Stone for $158.34 (equivalent to $3,004 in 2025). On May 12, 1801, Medad Stone sold the island to the government for $325 (equivalent to $6,289 in 2025). Joel Helander, a historian, notes that Medad Stone and the government were likely openly communicating about the island. The United States Congress appropriated $6000 in March 1801 for the lighthouse, prior to the government's acquisition of the property.

It was inhabited throughout the 1700s through 1976, with the Faulkner family and various lightkeepers of the Falkner Island Light. During the War of 1812, the British forces landed on the island and told the keeper's wife, Thankful Stone, that they had nothing to fear as long as they kept the light burning. Later, the keeper, Solomon Stone, had to put the light out per order of the New London customs inspector. The British threatened to blow up the lighthouse and Stone got an order to relight the lighthouse. In 2008, the generator house for the light was renovated to be a summer house for the United States Fish and Wildlife Service interns who study the endangered roseate terns. The erosion control project was completed, but Hurricane Irene and Hurricane Sandy greatly reduced the breeding habitat of the terns to just 50 square metres (540 ft^{2}).

Erosion threatens the island's very existence, it is believed that it was around eight acres in 1639 before being reduced to 5.70 acres by 1818. By 1987, the total area has fallen to 2.87 acres and it was projected that it could lose another 12 inches each year until the lighthouse crumbles into the sea around 2026.

== Falkner Island Light ==
The Falkner Island Lighthouse was constructed in 1802 and commissioned by President Thomas Jefferson. The lighthouse has had three keeper's houses throughout its service life, the first erected in 1802 and rebuilt in 1851 and again in 1871. The keeper's house burned in 1976 and the lighthouse was repaired and automated in 1978. The Faulkner's Light Brigade has undertaken the restoration and preservation of the lighthouse since 1991, with the last major restoration work being completed in March 2011. Access to Falkner Island and the light is restricted during the nesting season of the roseate terns, from May to August. The Falkner Island Lighthouse is the second oldest extant lighthouse in Connecticut and is listed on the National Register of Historic Places.

== Wildlife ==
In 1985, the island became part of the Stewart B. McKinney National Wildlife Refuge after it was acquired from the U.S. Coast Guard. According to the Connecticut Audubon Society, "it currently supports over 95% of the nesting Common Terns in Connecticut. It is the site of one of the ten largest Roseate Tern (~45 pairs) colonies in Northeastern North America, and is the only regular nesting location for this federally endangered species in the state." Also living on the island is the American oystercatcher, with one to two breeding pairs noted each year. Although the erosion control project was completed, Hurricane Irene and Hurricane Sandy greatly reduced the breeding habitat of the terns to just 50 square metres (540 ft^{2}). In spring 2014, the dock damaged by Hurricane Sandy was scheduled to be rebuilt.

== See also ==
- Goose Island (Guilford)
- Falkner Island Light
- Thimble Islands
- Outer Lands
- List of Falkner Island Light keepers
- Stewart B. McKinney National Wildlife Refuge
