= Peabody Museum of Natural History =

Natural history museum of Yale University in Connecticut, US

Yale Peabody Museum
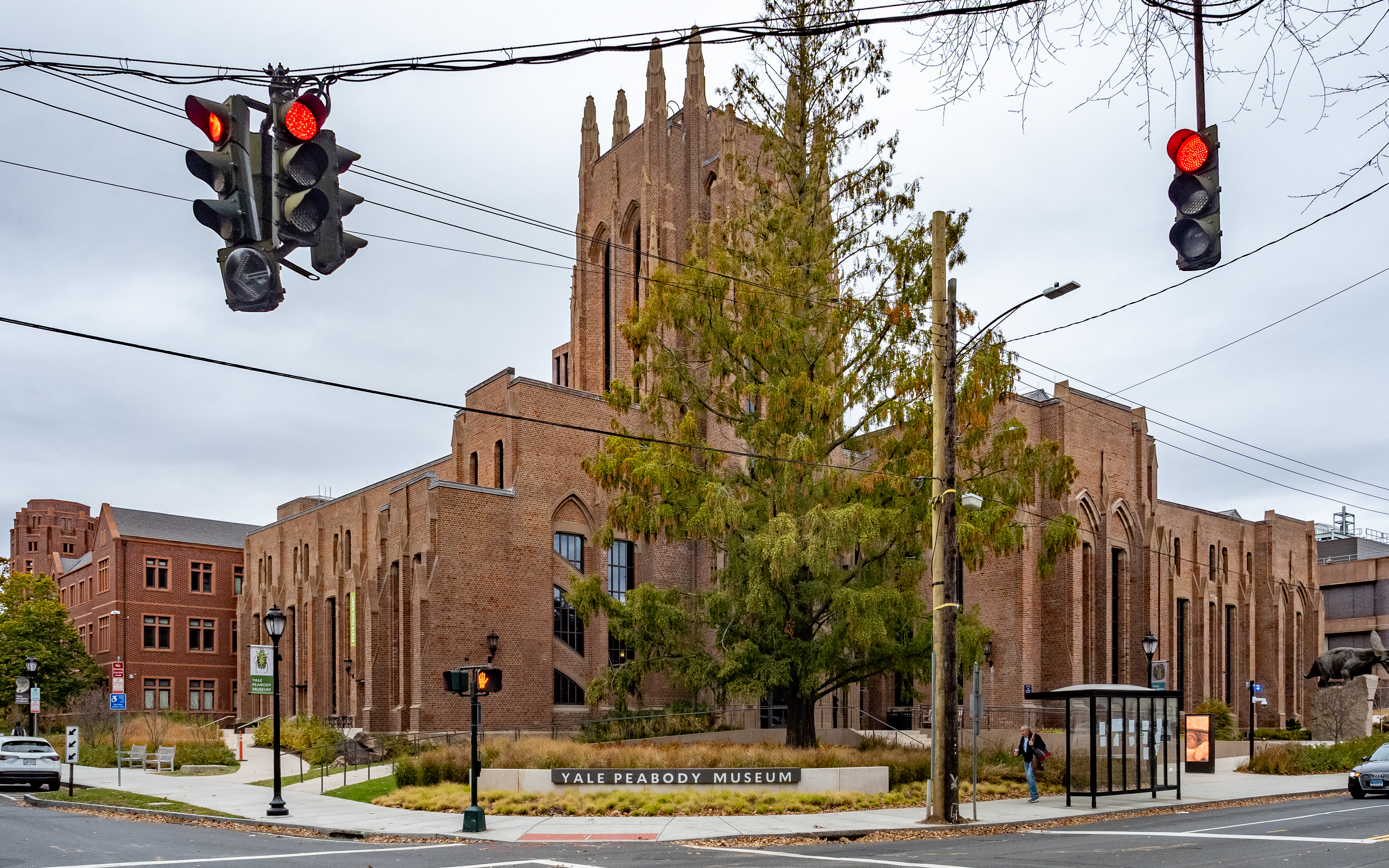
- Exterior of Yale Peabody Museum

- New Haven, Connecticut, US
- Established: 1866
- Location: New Haven, Connecticut, US
- Coordinates: 41.317538°N 72.919863°W
- Type: Natural History
- Director: David Skelly
- Owner: Yale University
- Public transit access: 228, 229
- Website: peabody.yale.edu

The Yale Peabody Museum at Yale University (also known as the Peabody Museum of Natural History or the Yale Peabody Museum of Natural History) is one of the oldest, largest, and most prolific university natural history museums in the world. It was founded by the philanthropist George Peabody in 1866 at the behest of his nephew Othniel Charles Marsh, an early paleontologist. The museum is best known for the Great Hall of Dinosaurs, which includes a mounted juvenile Brontosaurus and the 110-foot-long (34 m) mural The Age of Reptiles. The museum also has permanent exhibits dedicated to human and mammal evolution; wildlife dioramas; Egyptian artifacts; local birds and minerals; and Native Americans of Connecticut.

In 2020, the Peabody Museum closed for its "first comprehensive renovation in 90 years." It reopened, with more than twice the exhibition space, on March 26, 2024.

== Description ==
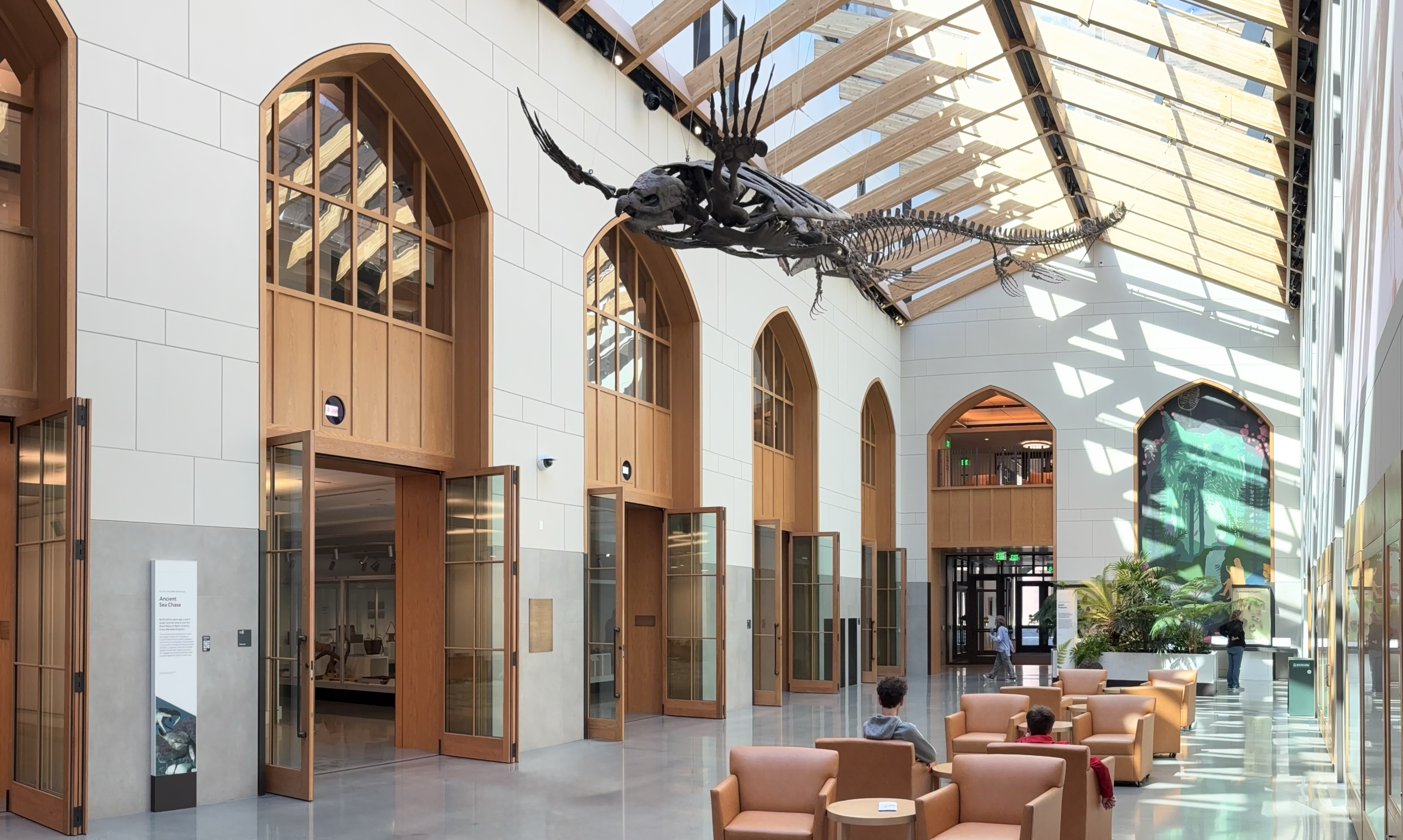
Central Gallery, after 2024 renovation

The Peabody Museum is located at 170 Whitney Avenue in New Haven, Connecticut, and is staffed by nearly a hundred staff members. The original building was demolished in 1917; it moved to its current location in 1925, and has since expanded to occupy the Peabody Museum, the attached Kline Geology Laboratory, the Class of 1954 Environmental Sciences Center, parts of three additional buildings, and a field station at Long Island Sound. The museum also owns Horse Island in the Thimble Islands, which is not open to the public; it is used for experiments. The Class of 1954 Environmental Science Center, completed in 2001 and connected to the museum and the adjacent Kline Geology Laboratory, hosts approximately one-half of the museum's 13 million specimens.

On August 28, 2018, Yale University announced a contribution of $160 million (equivalent to $205.14 million in 2025) by Edward P. Bass towards the cost of the renovation of the museum. The landmark commitment ranks among the most generous gifts to Yale and is the largest known gift ever made to a natural history museum in the United States, helping to fund the renewal and expansion of the museum.

The galleries were planned to be open through June 30, 2020 (the Great Hall of Dinosaurs was open through January 1, 2020), but had to close in March due to COVID-19 and did not reopen until the conclusion of renovations in 2024. The renovation more than doubled the exhibition space, added 10 classrooms, and included a new education center for K-12 students.

In November 2021, Yale University announced that admission will be free "in perpetuity" once construction is complete.

The Peabody has several world-important collections. Perhaps the most notable are the vertebrate paleontology collections which are among the largest, most extensive, and most historically important fossil collections in the United States (see Othniel Charles Marsh, R.S. Lull, George Gaylord Simpson, John Ostrom, Elisabeth Vrba, and Jacques Gauthier), and the Hiram Bingham Collection of Incan artifacts from Machu Picchu, named for the famous Yale archaeologist who rediscovered the Peruvian ruin. Also notable are the extensive ornithology collection, one of the largest and most taxonomically inclusive in the world, and the associated William Robertson Coe Ornithology Library, one of the best in the United States. The collection of marine invertebrates is also extensive, having benefitted from the work of prolific invertebrate zoologists including Addison Emery Verrill. The Yale Herbarium is part of the Peabody Museum.

Faculty curators for the collections are drawn from Yale's departments of Ecology and Evolutionary Biology, Geology and Geophysics, and Anthropology. Because the departments maintain a strong tradition of hiring faculty to perform collections-based research, especially after the renewed support for organismal biology at Yale under President Richard Charles Levin and in particular former provost Alison Richard, nearly all of the collections are under active internal use and enjoy continuous and considerable growth.

== Torosaurus ==
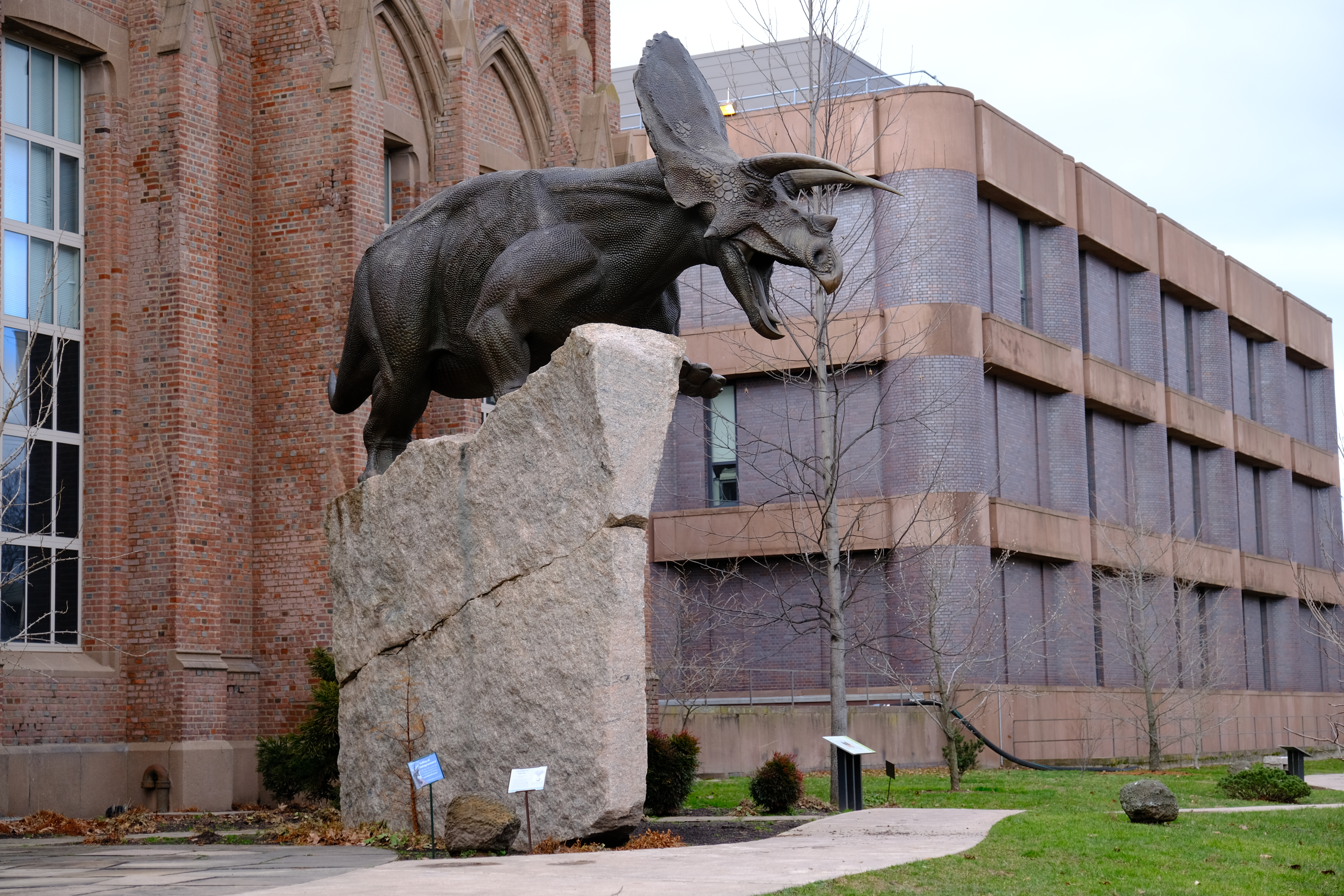
Full-scale sculpture of Torosaurus

The museum has erected the first full-scale reproduction of a Torosaurus on Whitney Avenue next to the entrance. The 3 m (9 ft) tall, 7 m (21 ft) long, 3.33 metric ton (7,350 lb) statue was sculpted in clay and cast in bronze, and set on a 4 m (13 ft) tall granite base. The reproduction of T. latus is scientifically faithful of T. latus, and its skin is based on the fossilized skin impressions left by a Chasmosaurus (a closely related ceratopsid).

== Exhibits ==
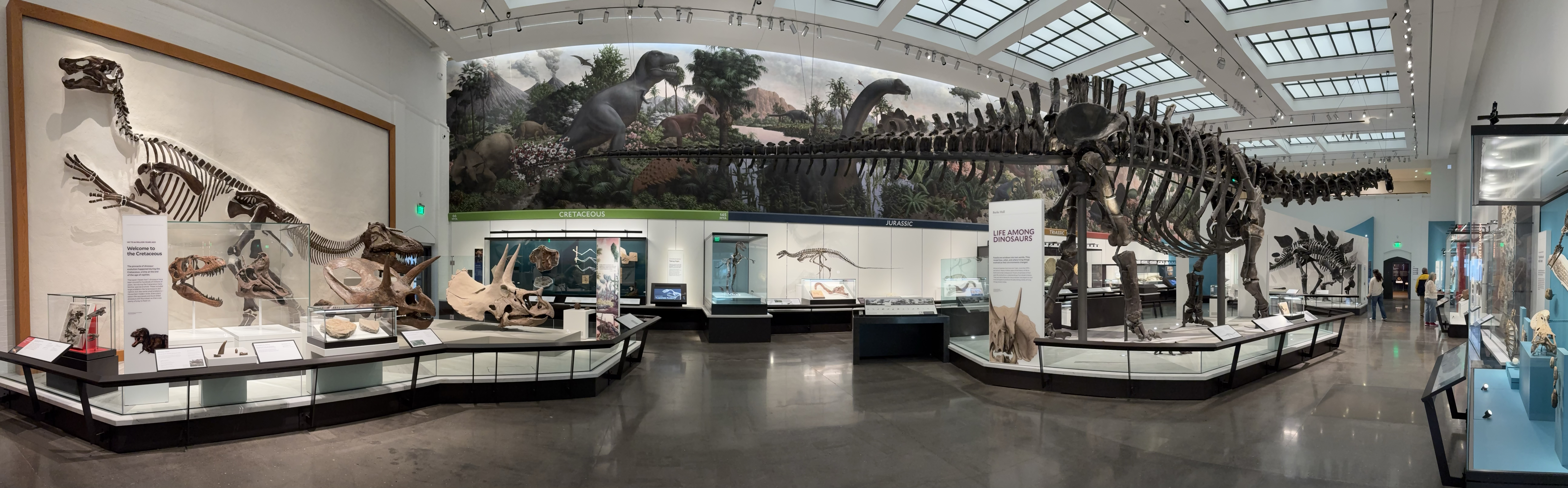
Burke Hall of Dinosaurs, after 2024 renovation

Permanent exhibits before renovations have included:

- The Great Hall of Dinosaurs (this exhibit will be in the same place with same mural after renovation) with the skeleton of a Brontosaurus.
  - The Age of Reptiles Mural is a 110-foot-long (34 m) depiction of dinosaurs in their natural habitats. It was painted by Rudolph F. Zallinger, and is located in the Great Hall of Dinosaurs.
- Fossil Fragments: The Riddle of Human Origins is a new exhibit dedicated to human evolution.
- The Birds of Connecticut Hall has 722 specimens, representing more than 300 of the 382 documented species in the state of Connecticut.
- There are eleven dioramas in total: three on the ecology of Connecticut with plants and vertebrates, and eight depicting various regions around North America. They were designed by James Perry Wilson, F. Lee Jaques, and Ralph C. Morrill.
- The Hall of Mammalian Evolution includes The Age of Mammals mural, also painted by Zallinger.
- An extensive collection of minerals, primarily from Connecticut
- Native American artifacts from Connecticut
- The Hall of Ancient Egyptian Artifacts
- The museum has displayed one of the longest known preserved fulgurites, approximately 4 m (13 ft) in length.

== Staff ==
As of 2024, the director of the Peabody Museum is David Skelly, a curator of vertebrate zoology and a professor of ecology in the Department of Ecology & Evolutionary Biology, and the School of Forestry and Environmental Studies. He was named director in 2014.

The Peabody Museum has curators representing anthropology, botany, entomology, invertebrate zoology, invertebrate paleontology, vertebrate zoology (with individual curators for herpetology, ichthyology, mammalogy, and ornithology), paleobotany, vertebrate paleontology; mineralogy and meteoritics; and historical scientific instruments.

There are almost 100 full-time and part-time staff, including curators, assistant curators, curators emeriti, curatorial affiliates, and volunteers. Curators and assistant curators are also faculty members in related departments.

== History ==
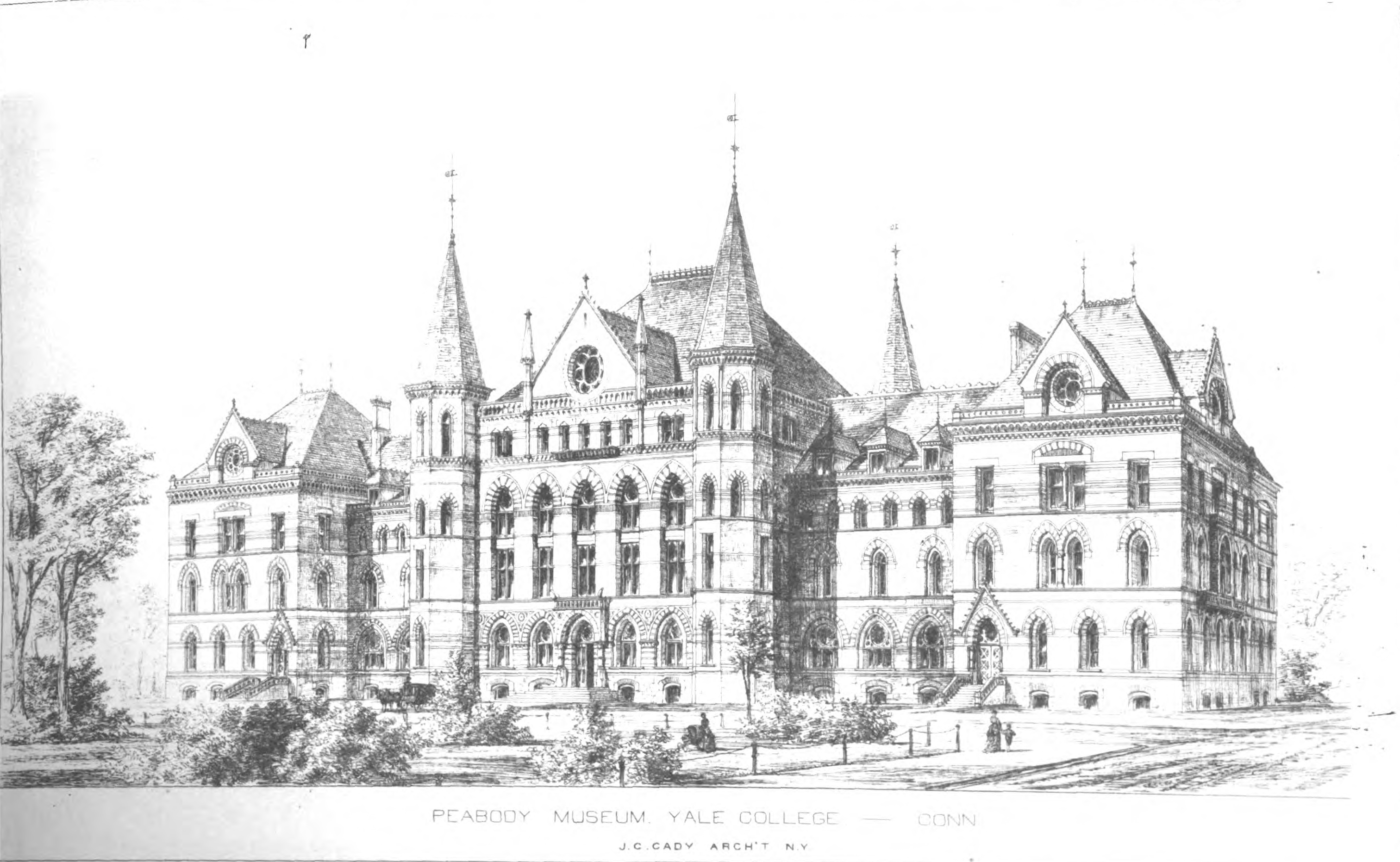
Original Peabody Museum (1874)

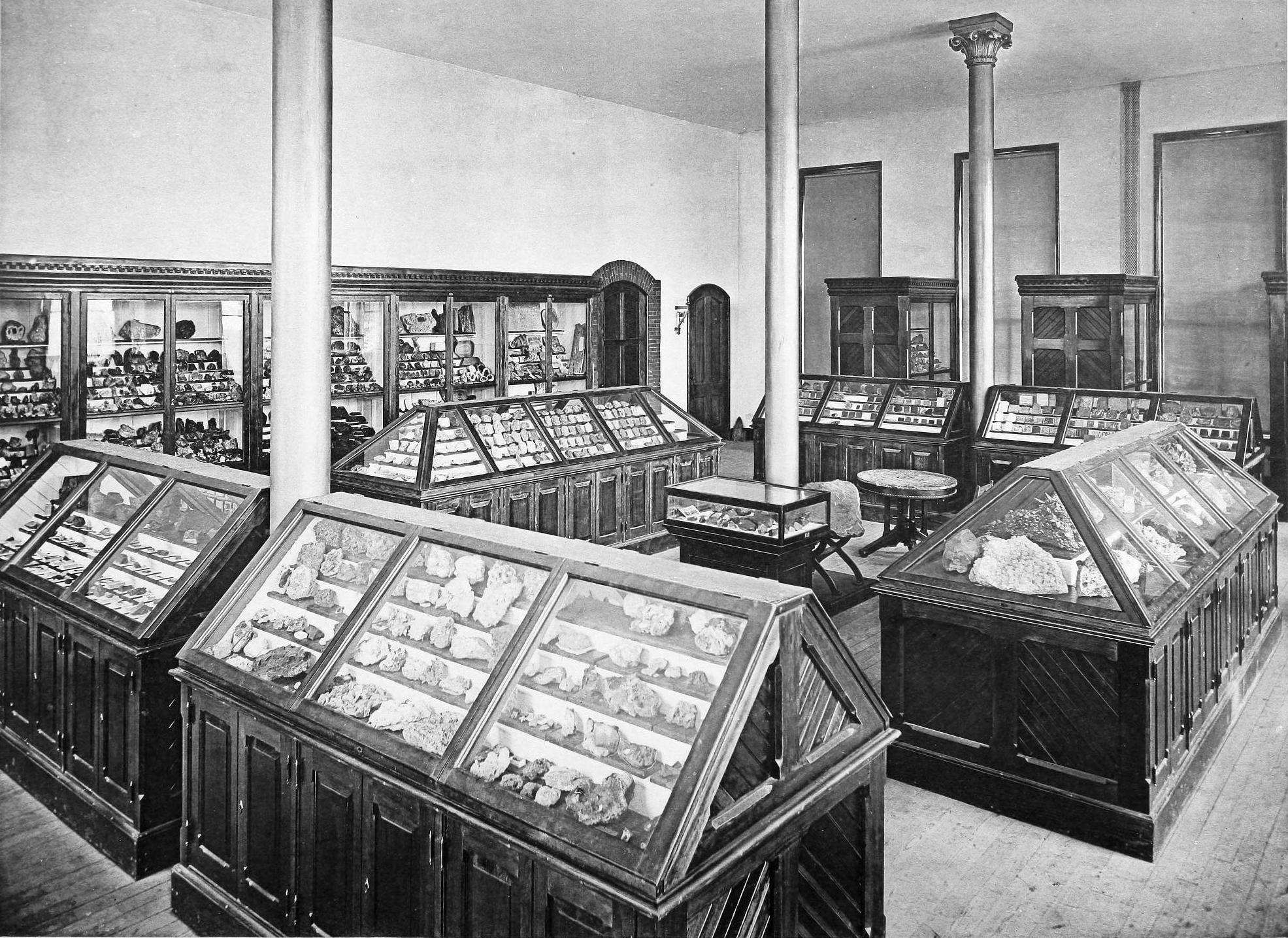
Displays of minerals (c. 1879)

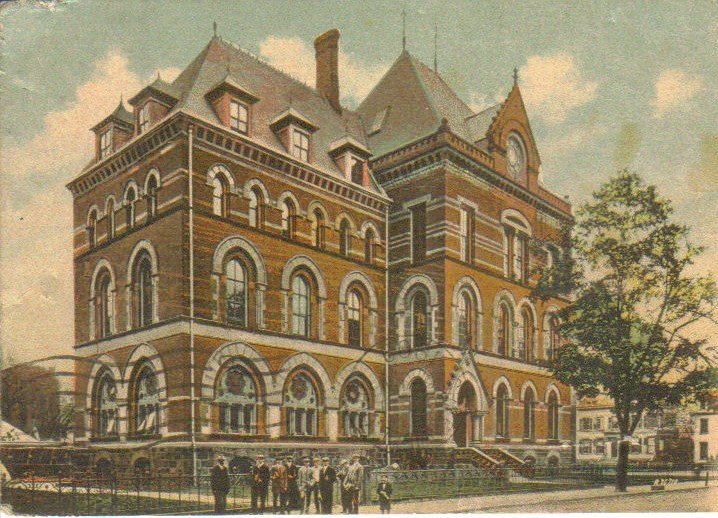
The museum as shown on a postcard mailed in 1909

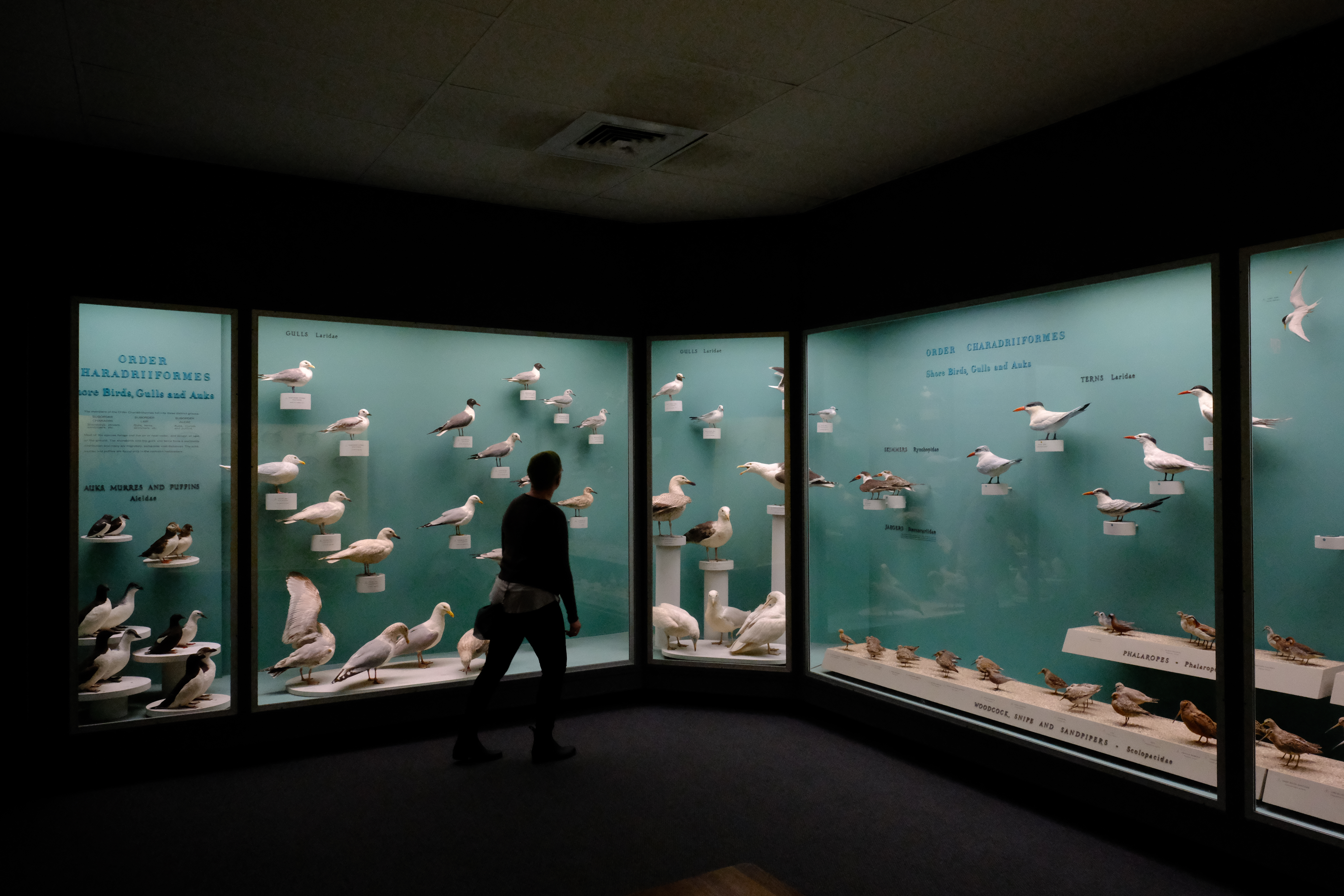
An ornithology exhibit

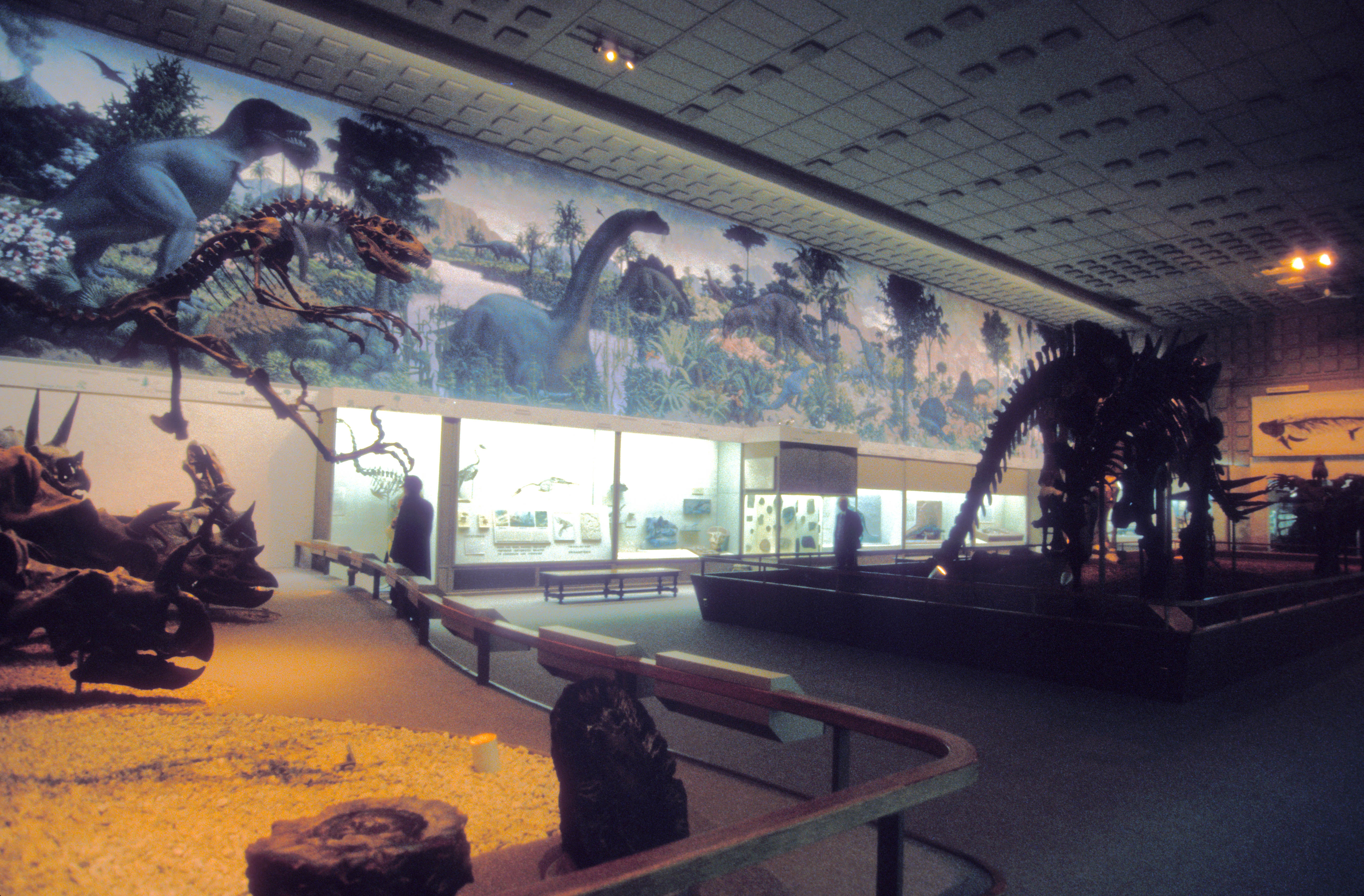
The Hall of Dinosaurs includes the mural, The Age of Reptiles

Othniel Charles Marsh was an undergraduate and later the Professor of Paleontology at Yale University. His education was paid for by his wealthy uncle George Peabody, who began to donate much of his accumulated wealth to various educational institutions at the end of his life. Marsh and his teams discovered dozens of new genera of dinosaurs and other fossil animals, including Triceratops, Brontosaurus, and Hesperornis. At the request of Marsh and to house some of his discoveries, Peabody founded Yale's Museum of Natural History in 1866 with a gift of $150,000 (equivalent to $3.3 million in 2025).

Yale's collection at the time was mostly minerals, collected by the geologist and mineralogist Benjamin Silliman. Marsh was one of the museum's first three curators and when Peabody died in 1869, he used his inheritance to fund expeditions bringing back specimens which greatly increased the museum's collections. His primary interest was dinosaurs. During the infamous period in paleontological history known as the Bone Wars, he discovered 56 new species of dinosaur and literally shipped tons of fossils back from the American Southwest. His finds also included fossils of vertebrates and invertebrates, trackways of prehistoric animals; and archaeological and ethnological artifacts.

The museum officially opened to the public in 1876. In 1917, it was demolished and replaced by the Harkness Memorial Quadrangle dormitory. When World War I began most of the collections were put in storage until December 1925, when the current building was dedicated. The new building had a great, 2-story hall designed specifically to hold Marsh's dinosaurs.

Some other significant events include:

- In 1930, donation of the Harry Payne Bingham Oceanographic Collection, including the work of artist Wilfrid Swancourt Bronson.
- In 1931, the mounting of Marsh's Brontosaurus was finished, after 6 years of work.
- In 1947, Rudolph F. Zallinger finished painting dinosaurs in their natural habitats in his 110-foot-long (34 m) mural The Age of Reptiles, after 3 1/2 years of work.
- In 1959, Bingham Laboratory was completed.
- In 1963, Kline Geology Laboratory was completed.
- In 1972, the Birds of Connecticut Hall opened.
- 1985 – The Museum acquired the specimens of Princeton University following the shutdown of its paleontology program.
- In 2001, the interdisciplinary Class of 1954 Environmental Science Center was constructed on the site of the former Bingham Laboratory. It houses collections space for the museum and laboratory space for several curators.
- In 2005, the Peabody unveiled its 21-foot life-size bronze sculpture of Torosaurus—one of O.C. Marsh's famed dinosaur discoveries. The 7,350-pound sculpture sits on a 13-foot, 70-ton base of Stony Creek granite.
- In 2018, the Peabody announced a $160 million (equivalent to $205.14 million in 2025) transformative gift toward a redefining renovation that will greatly expand its research capabilities, education and collection centers, and its exhibition galleries.
- In 2020, the great hall closed at the beginning of the year, the rest of the museum closed in March, and many artifacts were transported to West Haven campus in December.

== Education ==
The Peabody Museum offers a certificate in natural illustration, specializing in comparative anatomy and plant morphology. The certificate includes 336 hours of coursework, along with personal study and the development of a portfolio.

== Popular culture ==
- The museum was featured in The Simpsons episode "Burns, Baby Burns". In the episode Mr. Burns has had a relationship with Lily Bancroft and produced an illegitimate son (voiced by Rodney Dangerfield). He is shown in a flashback to 1939 for his 25th graduation class reunion. They make love in the museum, specifically in an exhibit which features Inuit and penguins.
