= Outer Island (Connecticut) =

Island in New Haven County, Connecticut, United States

Coordinates: 41.2420°N 72.7605°W

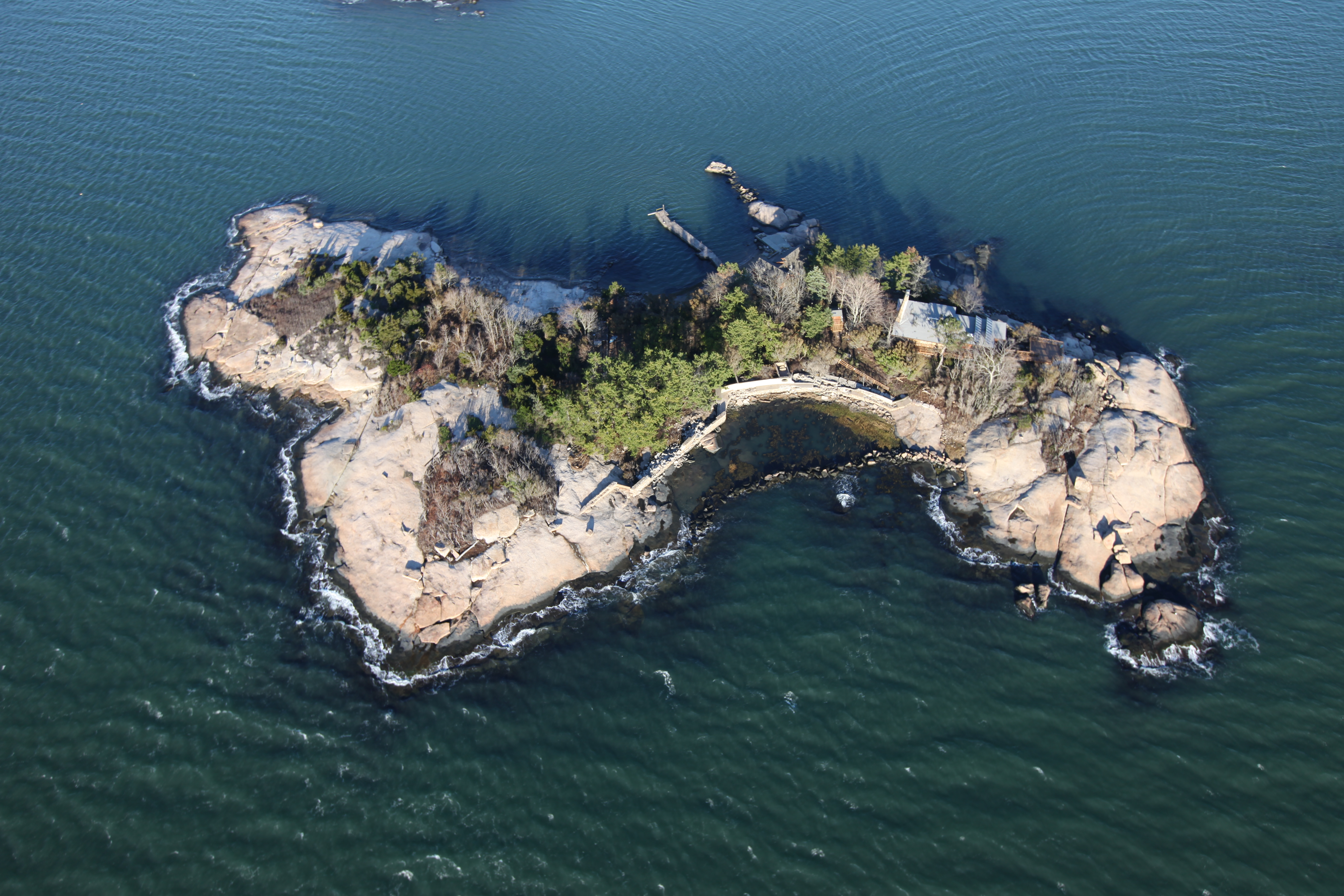
Outer Island in the aftermath of Hurricane Sandy

Outer Island is a 5-acre island located in Long Island Sound. It is one of the Thimble Islands, a small archipelago just south of Stony Creek, a hamlet of Branford, Connecticut. Outer Island is the southern terminus and most remote island found within this archipelago. It is on the ten units of the Stewart B. McKinney National Wildlife Refuge. The island was transferred to the United States Fish and Wildlife Service in 1995 by Elizabeth Hird. This island provides habitat for marine and avian wildlife.

It is maintained in a cooperative partnership with Southern Connecticut State University and currently used ecological laboratory and an outdoor natural classroom by school groups from the city of New Haven.

Visitors are able to access Outer Island via a small public dock and beaching are on the leeward side of the island. There is a small interpretive center that is staffed by volunteers during the summer season. Student volunteers also work on improvement projects on the island in conjunction with the Friends of Outer Island organization and the National Fish and Wildlife Service.

== See also ==
- Thimble Islands
- Outer Lands
