= Stony Creek–Thimble Islands Historic District =

Historic district in Connecticut, United States

- U.S. National Register of Historic Places
- U.S. Historic district
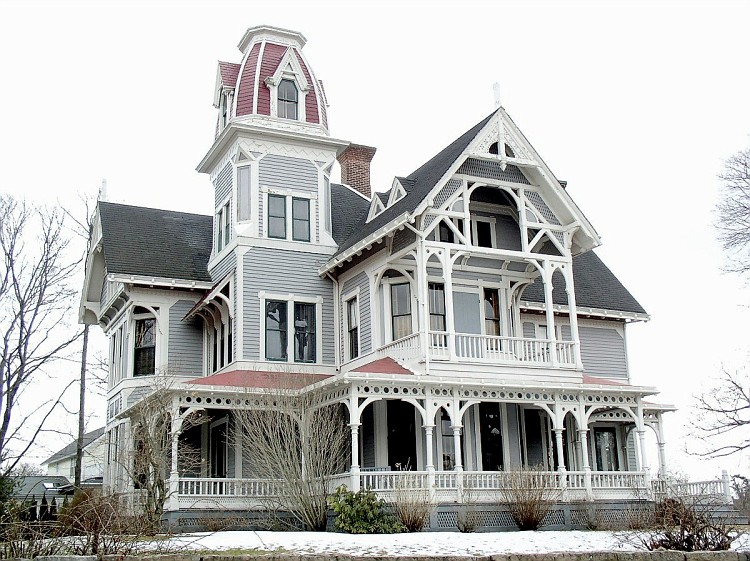
- A Gothic Victorian house in Stony Creek

- Location within Connecticut Location within the United States
- Location: Roughly Thimble Islands Road between Route 146 and Long Island Sound and the Thimble Islands, Branford, Connecticut
- Coordinates: 41°15′33″N 72°45′18″W
- Area: 1,400 acres (5.7 km^{2})
- Architect: Multiple
- Architectural style: Mid 19th Century Revival, Late 19th And 20th Century Revivals, Colonial
- NRHP reference No.: 88002844
- Added to NRHP: December 16, 1988

The Stony Creek–Thimble Islands Historic District is a historic district encompassing a 19th-century summer resort area in Branford, Connecticut. Located in the southeastern part of the town, it encompasses the mainland Stony Creek neighborhood, and all of the major Thimble Islands which lie offshore from Stony Creek in Long Island Sound. The district includes a well-preserved array of domestic summer resort architecture spanning more than a century preceding World War II, as well as worker housing and other artifacts related to the area's brief importance as a granite quarry. The district was listed on the National Register of Historic Places in 1988.

== Description and history ==
The development of Stony Creek and the Thimble Islands as a summer resort began following the 1852 opening of the railroad through Branford. By the 1860s Stony Creek included hotels and summer cottages, serving a growing middle and upper-class clientele from Connecticut's growing interior industrial base. Around the turn of the 20th century, trolley service to New Haven was introduced, bringing about a gradual increase in the number of year-round residents who commuted to the city for work. Concurrent with this resort development was the growth of the area's granite quarries, which began in the 1840s and peaked in the 1880s. Although a few granite pits are still evident in the landscape, the only significant surviving elements are housing for quarry workers and services supporting them, and the remains of wharves used by the quarrying operations.

The 1,400-acre (5.7 km^{2}) area of the district includes much of the Stony Creek mainland area of Branford, along Thimble Islands Rd. between Route 146 and Long Island Sound, and includes all of the major Thimble Islands. Only a few buildings predate the resort period, including examples of Georgian and Federal architecture. There is one notable example of Greek Revival architecture from the 1840s: it is a cottage on Money Island. Italianate houses from the 1850s tend to be modest in scale and style, and are mainly located in the Stony Creek village area, which served the local granite quarries. Later Victorian-style houses are located throughout the area, which is known for its particularly large and well-preserved collection of Stick style houses. Probably the most elaborate of these is the William J. Clark House at 32 Prospect Hill, which is separately listed on the National Register. It was designed by the New Haven architect Henry Austin.

== See also ==
- National Register of Historic Places listings in New Haven County, Connecticut
