= Little Pumpkin Island =

Island in Connecticut, United States

Little Pumpkin Island is an island in the Thimble Islands archipelago. It was named because the owner entered a pumpkin-growing contest for the biggest pumpkin, but ended up rearing the smallest of the entries.

== See also ==
- Outer Lands
