= Bear Island (Connecticut) =

Island in New Haven County, Connecticut, United States

Coordinates: 41.25497°N 72.74091°W

Bear Island is one of the Thimble Islands off Stony Creek, a section of Branford, Connecticut, USA. It is the site to a former granite quarry, which exported high-quality pink granite to such constructions as the Lincoln Memorial, Grant's Tomb and the base of the Statue of Liberty. The famous Stony Creek granite is still quarried in Stony Creek.

Bear Island was called "Goat Island" by locals until the 1890s, referring to goat herds kept there for milk by its community of Swedish immigrant quarry workers.

== See also ==
- Thimble Islands
- Outer Lands
