= Hall Island =

Hall Island may refer to:

- Hall Island (Alaska)
- Hall Island (Arctic), an island in Franz Josef Land
- Hall Island (Connecticut); see List of islands of Connecticut
- Hall Island (Michigan)
- Hall Island, Willis Islands, off South Georgia
- Hall Island (Washington), one of the San Juan Islands
- Hall Island (Nunavut), off Baffin Island
- Little Hall Island, off Baffin Island
- The Hall Islands, two large atolls in Micronesia
