= William J. Clark House =

Historic house in Connecticut, United States

- Stick Style House at Stony Creek
- U.S. National Register of Historic Places
- U.S. Historic district – Contributing property
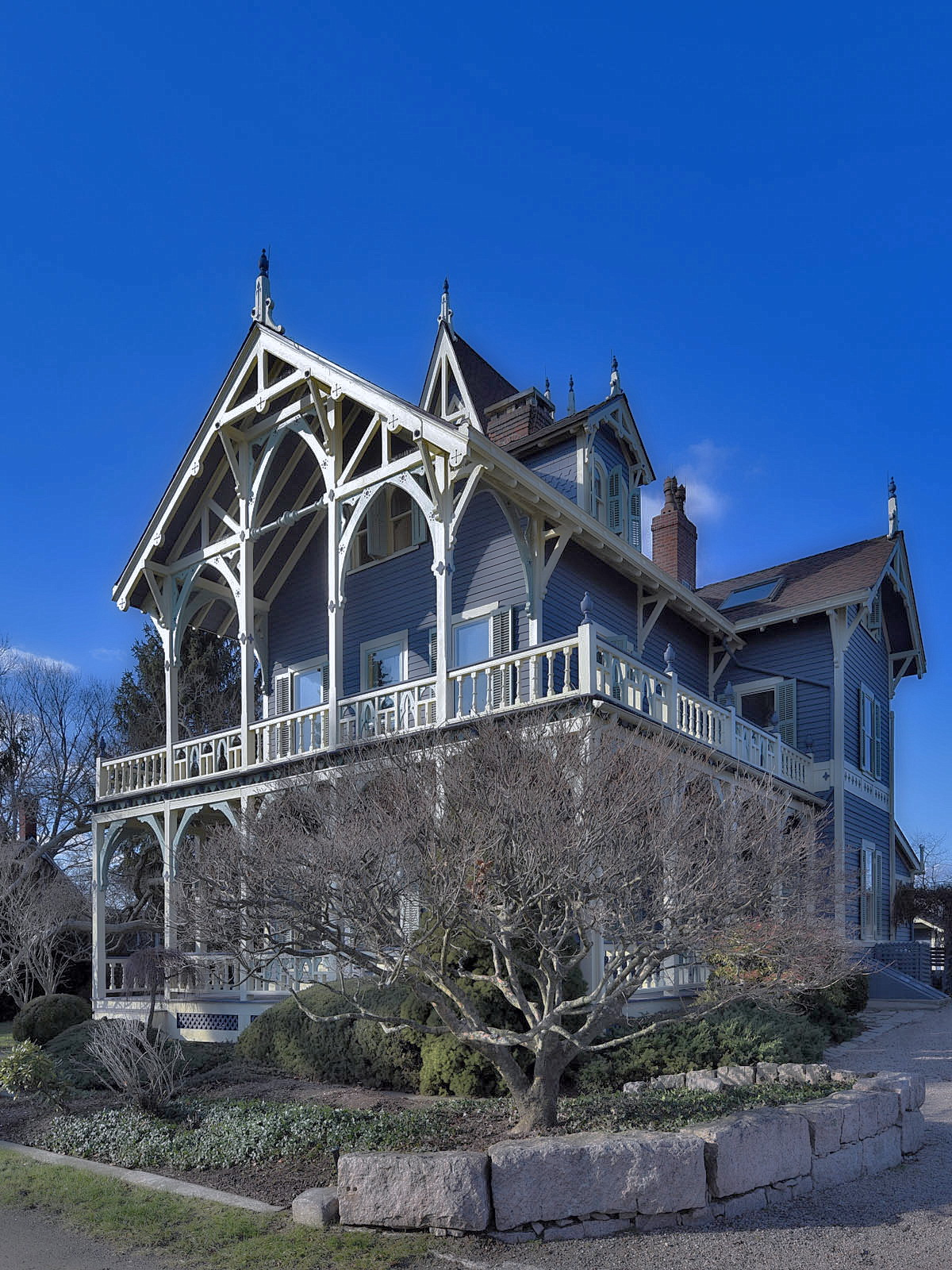

- Location within Connecticut Location within the United States
- Interactive map showing the location of William J. Clark House
- Location: 32 Prospect Hill Road, Branford, Connecticut
- Coordinates: 41°15′37″N 72°44′43″W
- Area: 2 acres (0.81 ha)
- Built: 1878
- Architect: Henry Austin
- Architectural style: Stick/Eastlake
- Part of: Stony Creek-Thimble Islands Historic District (ID88002844)
- NRHP reference No.: 72001322

Significant dates
- Added to NRHP: December 27, 1972
- Designated CP: December 16, 1988

The William J. Clark House is a historic house at 32 Prospect Hill Road in the Stony Creek neighborhood of Branford, Connecticut. Built in 1878–80 to a design by New Haven-based architect Henry Austin, it is a particularly fine example of the Stick style of architecture popular at the time. The house is individually listed for its architecture on the National Register of Historic Places as the Stick Style House at Stony Creek, and is a contributing property to the Stony Creek-Thimble Islands Historic District.

== Description and history ==
The Clark House is located in southeastern Branford's Stony Creek neighborhood, an area which flourished as a summer resort colony in the late 19th century. It occupies 2 acres (0.81 ha) on the north side of Prospect Hill Road, with views to the Thimble Islands and Long Island Sound. It is a 2 1/2-story wood-frame structure, with a busy and ornately decorated roofline, including a three-story tower. The roof gables are adorned with woodwork which gives the Stick style its name, and an elaborately decorated single-story porch extends around parts of the building. The tower is capped by a steeply pitched gabled roof, with gabled dormers projecting from its sides. The interior retains many original period finishes.

The house was designed by Henry Austin and built in 1878–80 for William J. Clark, an industrialist from Southington, Connecticut. Clark was a veteran of the American Civil War, and also served in the state legislature. He spent his retirement years in this house. The house is the most architecturally significant in Branford's Stony Creek area.

== See also ==
- National Register of Historic Places listings in New Haven County, Connecticut
