= Davis Island (Connecticut) =

Island in New Haven County, Connecticut, United States

Coordinates: 41.25252°N 72.74700°W

Davis Island, one of the Thimble Islands off Stony Creek, a section of Branford, Connecticut, was the site of President William Howard Taft's "Summer White House".

== See also ==
- Thimble Islands
- Outer Lands
