= Mother-in-Law Island =

Island in Connecticut, United States

Coordinates: 41.2472°N 72.7499°W

Mother-in-Law Island is an island in the Thimble Islands group, part of the Stony Creek–Thimble Islands Historic District on Long Island Sound in Branford, Connecticut. It is also known as Johnson Island, Prudden Island, and Little Stooping Bush. One house, a frame-structured house built around 1965, stands on the island.

== Naming of the island ==
The island is said to have been named "Mother-in-Law Island" after two people got married on Money Island and then rowed off to the nearby island, planning to spend the night there in a tent. The newlywed woman's mother followed them to the island in another rowboat. That night, when the mother-in-law fell asleep, the couple, who felt their privacy was being invaded, went back to Money Island and took both boats with them, leaving her stranded there for three days before she was rescued.

In the entry of the National Register of Historic Places for the Stony Creek–Thimble Islands Historic District (filed in 1988), the island is called Johnson Island, with Prudden and Mother-in-Law listed as alternative names. It has also been called Little Stooping Bush.

== Bernay Johnson and current owners ==
Originally named Prudden Island, Commander Bernay Johnson was the owner of the island before 1981. Johnson was a friend of Richard Nixon, and, as a favor to his friend, Nixon got an Act of Congress passed renaming the island Johnson Island on all U.S. nautical maps. Rocks nearby are also named for him – Bernay’s Reef and Commander Rocks – but no local citizen knows those rocks’ names, except for sailors who read the charts to avoid them.

It was said that Johnson was also a friend of Liberace, a pianist who dressed in outlandish costumes. Liberace would visit and play on an old upright piano. Boaters would circle the island in the evening and listen to his classical music.

Johnson tried to con an oil company into purchasing the island after he claimed that he had found oil there. Johnson also said that he invented the first one-man submarine. He was a skydiver. And supposedly, he said that he wanted to be cremated and his remains were to be laid to rest in the pothole on Commander Rocks.

He finally stopped summering on Johnson or Mother-in Law Island when he was 75 years old and it was put up for sale shortly thereafter.

In 1981, Johnson sold the island to a family who have resided there each summer ever since. Although they did not strike oil, they did find a productive clam bed.

While locals know the island as Mother-in-Law and it’s Johnson Island on nautical maps, the island remains Prudden Island on the deed.
