= Governor Island (Connecticut) =

Island in New Haven County, Connecticut, United States

Coordinates: 41.255°N 72.7559°W

Governor Island is one of the Thimble Islands off Stony Creek, a section of Branford, Connecticut. It has 14 residences, although none are inhabited year-round.

Inhabited initially as an oyster company's base of operations. Since pigs will feed from an oyster shucker's waste pile, a "watch pig" was installed rather than a dog, eliminating the daily row out to feed the animal. The assertiveness of this pig quickly earned it the name "Governor". By the fourth season, the pig had grown so large and onerous that it kept even the oystermen off the island. Something had to be done since this was a commercial operation. In memory of the first pig roast, the island was named "Governor's". There remains a debate among the older islanders if Governor was a pig or a goat; with recent gentrification looking down upon "goat roasts".

One of the oldest houses on the island was built in 1880 by R.H. Brown and is still held by his family's descendants. R.H. Brown was a notable Connecticut brass manufacturer and is known to have made some of the finest yacht cannons ever made.

== See also ==
- Thimble Islands
- Outer Lands
