= Mother-in-law (disambiguation) =

Mother-in-law is a kinship relationship as a result of marriage.

Mother-in-law may also refer to:

- "Mother-in-Law" (song), a 1961 song recorded by Ernie K-Doe
- Mother-in-law (sandwich), a fast food dish of Chicago
- Mother-in-Law (TV series), a Kenyan comedy-drama series
- Mother-in-Law Island, in Connecticut, U.S.
- The Mother-in-Law, a 1734 play by James Miller
- The Mothers-in-Law, an American TV show premiering in 1967
- Mothers-in-law, a 1923 American silent drama film

== See also ==
- Mother-in-law apartment
- Mother-in-law language
- Mother-in-Law Lounge
