= Cut in Two Island =

Islands in New Haven County, Connecticut, United States

Coordinates: 41.25516°N 72.74837°W

Cut in Two Island, East and West, are two of the Thimble Islands off Stony Creek, a section of Branford, Connecticut. It is actually two separate islands, but, as the name suggests, it looks like a single island that was cleaved in two.

== History ==
Cut in Two East was once the home of circus performer General Tom Thumb, of P.T. Barnum fame. He lived on the island with his wife, Lavinia Warren. Supposedly, at least one room was wallpapered with circus designs. Cut in Two East last sold in 2003 for $3.4 million and Cut in Two West in 2004 for $2.4 million. They were among several islands bought by Christine Svenningsen and, before his death, by her husband, party goods magnate John Svenningsen.
