= High Island (Connecticut) =

Island in New Haven County, Connecticut, United States

One of the Thimble Islands, High Island once served as a hideout for famed pirate Captain Kidd. Kidd's Harbor on the island, as well as nearby Kidd's Island, were named for him. Money Island was named for the legend that he allegedly buried a portion of his treasure here.
