= Horse Island (Connecticut) =

Island in the United States of America

Coordinates: 41°14′41″N 72°45′26″W

Horse Island, at 17 acres (69,000 m²), is the largest of the Thimble Islands off Stony Creek, a section of Branford, Connecticut. It is owned by Yale University and is maintained as an ecological laboratory by Yale's Peabody Museum of Natural History. It was purchased and donated to the university in 1971 as a convenient addition to the Yale Coastal Field Station in nearby Guilford, which has its own dock and boats, and is also managed by Yale's Peabody Museum of Natural History.

A large house on the island has been kept in good repair and can serve as a base for experimenters or others remaining on the island for overnight stays or longer. According to the Yale Alumni Magazine, "Horse Island used to be a summer retreat; there’s still an eight-room house and evidence of a tennis court. The island now functions as a natural classroom, used for research and teaching. It’s also visited by a wide variety of migrating birds, which are actively studied by Yale researchers." In 2020, Yale faculty and students from the School of Architecture partnered with the Peabody Museum to build a teaching and coastal research center for the Yale Peabody Museum of Natural History. The center was built using a "regenerative approach." This approach aims to reduce the carbon footprint of the building, from construction to daily use, and limits the number of toxic materials used during construction. The Center will function off-grid with a kitchenette, toilet (which incinerate waste into ash), and two bunks for sleeping. The Center will feature a 30-foot-by-16-foot classroom with projection screens and barn-style doors.

The origins of the island's name are not known. Some say that at some point a cargo of horses may have found its way to the island from a capsized or wrecked ship, but no physical or documentary traces of such an event exist. Others speculate that the island's horseshoe shape may have influenced its name. For many years it was owned by an executive of Standard Oil named Clark, and was called "Clark's Island" by everyone. When James and Esther Rettger purchased the island in 1946 they restored the original name as found on the geodetic survey maps.

== See also ==
- Thimble Islands
- Outer Lands
