= Stewart McKinney (politician) =

American politician (1931–1987)

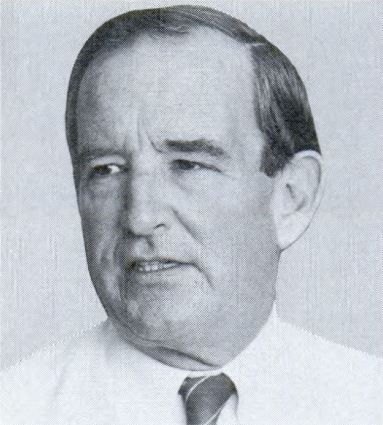
- McKinney in 1985

Member of the U.S. House of Representatives from Connecticut's 4th district
- In office January 3, 1971 – May 7, 1987
- Preceded by: Lowell Weicker
- Succeeded by: Chris Shays

Member of the Connecticut House of Representatives from the 141st district
- In office January 4, 1967 – January 3, 1971
- Succeeded by: Harry Wenz

Personal details
- Born: Stewart Brett McKinney; January 30, 1931 Pittsburgh, Pennsylvania, U.S.
- Died: May 7, 1987 (aged 56) Washington, D.C., U.S.
- Party: Republican
- Spouse: Lucie Cunningham
- Children: 5, including John
- Education: Princeton University (attended); Yale University (BA)

Stewart Brett McKinney (January 30, 1931 – May 7, 1987) was an American politician of the Republican Party who represented Connecticut's 4th congressional district in the House of Representatives from 1971 until his death. He is perhaps best known for coining the phrase "too big to fail" in regard to large American financial institutions, as well as for his struggle with, and eventual death from, AIDS.

== Early life ==
McKinney was born in Pittsburgh, Pennsylvania and raised in Fairfield, Connecticut. He attended Kent School and later Princeton University from 1949 to 1951, but dropped out and enlisted in the United States Air Force. He attained the rank of sergeant and completed his enlistment in 1955. McKinney then returned to college and received a B.A. in history from Yale University in 1958.

He raced cars and was involved in several car-related businesses, including Auto Interior Decorators, Inc. and Fairfield Firestone. In addition, he was president of a chain of tire stores called CMF Tires; he also owned Lantern Point Real Estate Development and other ventures.

== Political career ==
In 1966, McKinney was elected as a Republican to the Connecticut State House of Representatives, where he served two terms between 1967 and 1971. During his second term, he served as minority leader.

In 1970, McKinney ran for the U.S. House and won. The New York Times called him "an independent-minded, liberal Republican". He became known for the McKinney-Vento Homeless Assistance Act of 1986, which provides federal money for shelter programs. He served on the Banking, Finance and Urban Affairs Committee, and is credited with coining the phrase "too big to fail", in connection with large banks. He also served on the House Select Committee on Assassinations. During this time, he was a director of Bridgeport Hospital.

== Death and legacy ==
McKinney died at Washington Hospital Center on May 7, 1987, at the age of 56, from AIDS-related complications. His physician speculated that McKinney became infected with HIV in 1979 as the result of blood transfusions during heart surgery. He was diagnosed with AIDS on April 22, 1987, during his final hospitalization. McKinney was known by friends to be bisexual, though his family said this was not the case, which raised the issue of how he had contracted the disease. Anti-gay prejudice at the time of McKinney's death in 1987 may have promoted a disingenuous approach to speculations on the cause of McKinney's HIV infection. Arnold Denson, the man with whom McKinney had been living in Washington, and to whom McKinney left property in his will, said that he had been McKinney's lover, and that he believed McKinney was already infected when Denson met him five years prior.

In 1987, Barney Frank became the first U.S. congressman to come out as gay of his own volition, and was inspired to do so in part by the death of McKinney; Frank told The Washington Post that after McKinney's death there was, "An unfortunate debate about 'Was he or wasn't he? Didn't he or did he?' I said to myself, I don't want that to happen to me."

After McKinney's death, Congress renamed the Salt Meadow National Wildlife Refuge in Connecticut the Stewart B. McKinney National Wildlife Refuge. Additionally, in 1988, Connecticut's legislature honored McKinney's legacy by naming the Stamford Transportation Center after him.

== Family ==
McKinney married Lucie Cunningham, the daughter of Briggs Cunningham II and Lucie Bedford, the granddaughter of a co-founder of Standard Oil. They had five children. Their son, John McKinney, was minority leader of the Connecticut State Senate until the end of 2014, and was an unsuccessful candidate for the Republican nomination for Governor in the 2014 elections.

== See also ==
- List of members of the American Legion
- List of members of the United States Congress who died in office (1950–1999)

U.S. House of Representatives
Preceded by Lowell Weicker	Member of the U.S. House of Representatives from Connecticut's 4th congressional district 1971–1987	Succeeded by Chris Shays
