= Kidd Harbor =

Harbor in Connecticut, United States

Kidd Harbor is a sheltered harbor in High Island, in the Thimble Islands of Branford, Connecticut. It was named in 1845 for Captain Kidd, who was alleged to have used the harbor as a place to hide his vessel, attacking unsuspecting ships who could not see him.

== History ==
The islands were known to the Mattabesek people as "Kuttomquosh", “the beautiful sea rocks". Adrian Block was the first European to discover the Thimble Islands in 1614.
