= Stewart B. McKinney National Wildlife Refuge =

Nature reserve in Connecticut, US

- IUCN category IV (habitat/species management area)
- Location within the United States
- Location: Connecticut, United States
- Nearest city: Westbrook, Connecticut
- Coordinates: 41°17′21.2316″N 72°28′18.4080″W
- Area: 950 acres (384.5 ha)
- Established: 1972
- Named for: Stewart B. McKinney
- Governing body: U.S. Fish and Wildlife Service
- Website: Stewart B. McKinney National Wildlife Refuge

The Stewart B. McKinney National Wildlife Refuge is a 950-acre (384.5 ha) National Wildlife Refuge in ten units across the U.S. state of Connecticut. Located in the Atlantic Flyway, the refuge spans 70 miles (110 km) of Connecticut coastline and provides important resting, feeding, and nesting habitat for many species of wading birds, shorebirds, songbirds and terns, including the endangered roseate tern. Adjacent waters serve as wintering habitat for brant, scoters, American black duck, and other waterfowl. Overall, the refuge encompasses over 900 acres (364.2 ha) of barrier beach, intertidal wetland and fragile island habitats.

Originally named the Salt Meadow National Wildlife Refuge, the refuge was renamed in 1987 after Stewart B. McKinney, a congressman from Connecticut.

== Units, wildlife, and facilities ==
The refuge consists of ten separate land units. From east to west they are:

- Salt Meadow Unit: Oldest unit of the refuge, the Salt Meadow unit is the location of the refuge headquarters in Westbrook, Connecticut. Salt Meadow is used by over 280 species of migrating neotropical birds during the spring and fall migrations. Thus, this unit has been designated an "Important Bird Area" by the National Audubon Society. The 2.5 miles (4.0 km) of trails at Salt Meadow wind through grassland, forest, and marsh habitats. The 9 acres (3.6 ha) of fields support woodcock, bluebirds, tree swallows, wild turkeys and numerous species of butterflies and dragonflies. Birdwatchers can expect to see great egrets, glossy ibis, snowy egrets, belted kingfishers, osprey, red tailed hawk, and many other species. Mammal species include red fox, white-tailed deer, skunk, and coyote. In partnership with Potopaug Audubon Society, the refuge hosts many wildlife events at Salt Meadow Unit throughout the year. These events have included owl walks, waterfowl walks, woodcock walks, bird banding demonstrations, and a presentation on live birds of prey. This unit is at 41.289231°N 72.47178°W.
- Falkner Island Unit: Falkner Island is located three miles (5 km) off the shore of Guilford, Connecticut. It must be accessed by private vessel and is closed to public visitation except during the open house. Falkner Island Unit is home to over 124 pairs of nesting roseate terns (a federally listed endangered species) and over 3000 nesting pairs of common terns. Thus, this unit has been designated an "Important Bird Area" by the National Audubon Society. The Falkner Island unit is closed to public visitation throughout the year due to the fragile status of the roseate terns that nest there. However, the refuge does open the island for a two-day open house each September. During the open house, visitors have an opportunity to visit an actual research camp and an historic lighthouse that was originally commissioned in 1802. The lighthouse, research facility, and the natural beauty of the island allow for many photographic opportunities. This unit is at 41.210880°N 72.653190°W
- Outer Island Unit: This unit is located on Outer Island in the Thimble Island Chain off the coast of Branford, Connecticut. It must be accessed by ferry from Stony Creek, Connecticut, or by private vessel. The pink granite which dominates the geology of Outer Island provides spectacular photography opportunities. While on the island, it is also likely that you will see common terns and roseate terns feeding off shore, green herons (these birds nest on the island), great egrets and snowy egrets feeding below the shoreline. This unit is at 41.2420°N 72.7605°W.
- Milford Point Unit: This unit is located near Milford, Connecticut, and features an observation deck along the boardwalk. The overlook at Milford Point allows visitors the opportunity to view the 9-acre (3.6 ha) barrier beach. Shorebirds such as sandpipers, oystercatchers, least terns and even the federally threatened piping plover may be seen from the platform. To decrease disturbance to this fragile area, wildlife viewing must be accomplished from the observation deck or the very tip of the peninsula. Fishermen and visitors may walk to the tip of the peninsula by way of a marked fishing access trail, but are discouraged from stopping along the way. This unit is at 41.1757°N 73.1015°W.
- Great Meadows Unit: This unit is located in Stratford, Connecticut. There are no nature trails at this time, however from the surrounding roadways, there are opportunities to see northern harriers, red-breasted mergansers, American black ducks, pied billed grebe, great blue herons, and numerous other bird species. This unit is at 41.160°N 73.135°W.
- Chimon Island Unit, Sheffield Island Unit, Goose Island Unit, and Peach Island Unit: These islands among the Norwalk Islands group are located off the shore of Norwalk, Connecticut, approximately 40 miles (60 km) east of New York City. A ferry to Sheffield Island leaves from Hope Dock, located near the Maritime Aquarium in South Norwalk. A private vessel must be used to reach Chimon Island Unit. The Goose Island and Peach Island units are closed to public visits. The trail at Sheffield Island allows visitors to view a tidal salt water pond which is utilized by egrets and belted kingfishers. The island is also heavily used by white-tailed deer. Adjacent to the refuge on Sheffield Island, the Norwalk Seaport Association maintains an historic stone lighthouse and keepers quarters. Tours are given of the lighthouse by the Norwalk Seaport Association for a nominal charge. These units are at: Chimon 41.065°N 73.39°W, Sheffield 41.052°N 73.415°W, Goose 41.071°N 73.372°W, and Peach 41.083°N 73.4055°W.
- Calf Island Unit: Calf Island in Greenwich is a 29 acres (12 ha) island that is 3,000 feet (910 m) from shore, and has been a part of the McKinney wildlife refuge since 2003. This unit is at 40.993°N 73.6395°W.

== Topography ==
The ten units of Stewart B. McKinney NWR include a variety of habitats from grassy upland, to tidal salt marsh. Native wildlife populations have diverse habitat requirements. Each species, from roseate terns to American black ducks, has very different needs for food, water, shelter and space. The refuge units along Connecticut's coast fill these needs by providing habitats that are forested, marshy, sandy and secluded island habitats.

== History ==
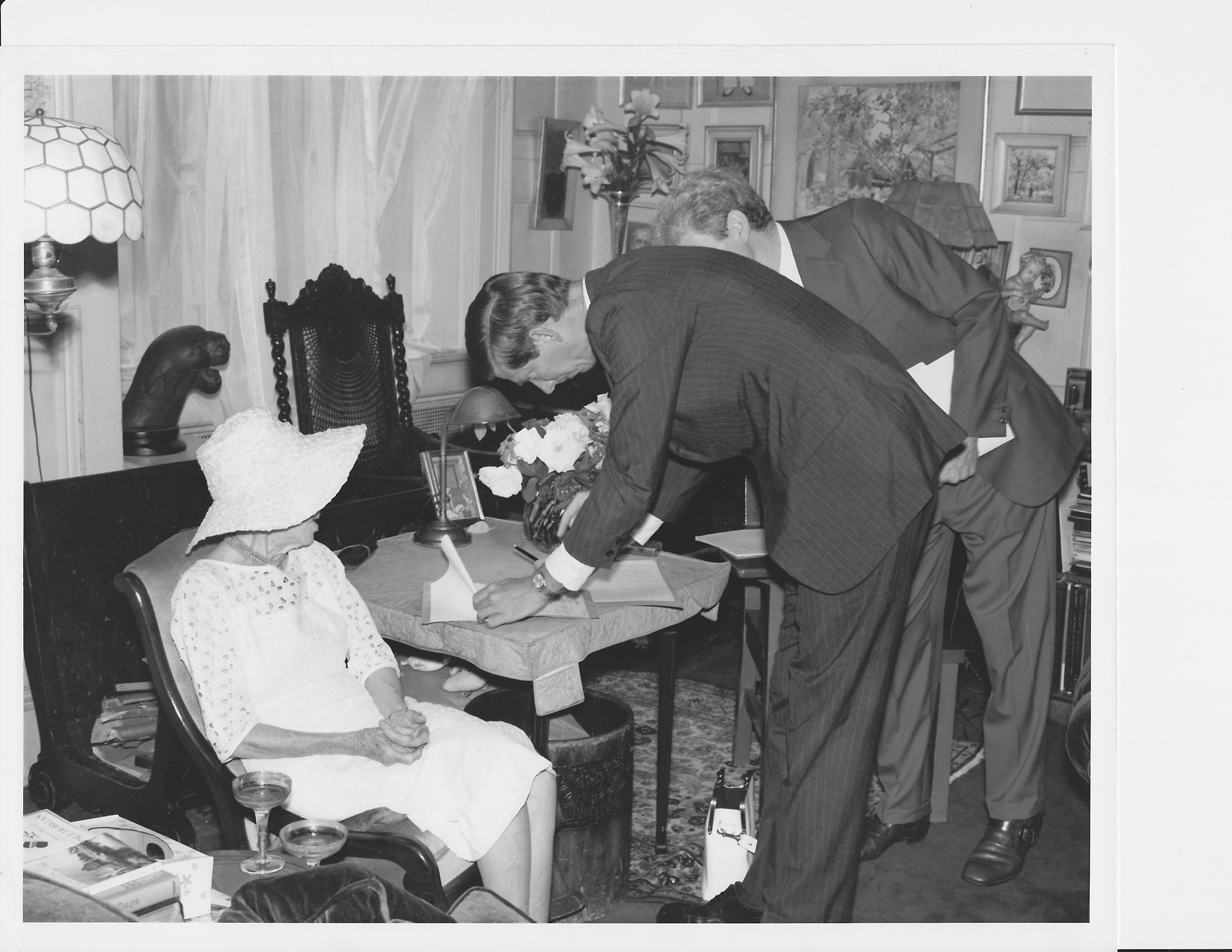
Assistant Secretary of the Interior Nathanial Reed accepts the donation of Salt Meadow (now part of McKinney National Wildlife Refuge) from Esther Lape, 1972

Salt Meadow was the country house of Elizabeth Fisher Read and Esther Lape. In 1972, after the death of Read, Lape donated over 150 acres (60.7 ha) of land in Westbrook, Connecticut, to the United States Fish and Wildlife Service. This donation became Salt Meadow National Wildlife Refuge. As neighbors donated or sold adjacent property to the US Fish and Wildlife Service, Salt Meadow grew to be a 274-acre (110.9 ha) refuge.

As the state became more and more populated, coastal areas and islands were being developed at an alarming rate. Citizens began to worry that the long legged wading birds and other shorebirds that use Connecticut's Islands and Coast would soon be without important nesting and feeding habitat. With the help of non-profit groups like The Connecticut Audubon Society, The Nature Conservancy, Trust for Public Land, and the Westbrook Land Trust, Sheffield, Chimon, and Goose Islands near Norwalk and Milford Point in Milford were acquired by the U.S. Fish and Wildlife Service.

In 1984, these Islands were added to Salt Meadow National Wildlife Refuge and the name was changed to Connecticut's Coastal National Wildlife Refuge. In 1987, the name of the refuge was again changed to honor US Congressman Stewart B. McKinney, who had an integral role in the refuge's formation.

In 2003, Calf Island in the town of Greenwich was added to the refuge. In 2005, Peach Island was added to the refuge. Through generous donations and the help of many partners the refuge now consists of ten refuge units spread across 70 miles (110 km) of Connecticut's coastline, from Westbrook to Greenwich.

== News ==
In 2007 and 2008 the town of Stratford debated whether the town would sell town owned lands to the U.S. Fish and Wildlife Service. If the property is sold, it would presumably be made part of the McKinney Refuge. From the Connecticut Post:

STRATFORD — One of the former Town Council's final decisions was to direct Mayor James R. Miron in November to enter into negotiations with the U.S. Fish and Wildlife Service in an effort to sell the 35-acre (140,000 m^{2}) Long Beach West Peninsula for at least $10 million. That is now possible because the town last year won its decade-long legal battle to evict the last of 45 cottage owners who once rented property on the peninsula when the state Supreme Court upheld a lower court decision in favor of the town.

== Comprehensive Conservation Planning Process ==
The U.S. Fish and Wildlife Service is required by the National Wildlife System Refuge Improvement Act of 1997 to create 15-year comprehensive conservation plans (CCPs) for each of its refuges. A CCP,

describes the desired future conditions of a refuge or planning unit; provides long-range guidance and management direction to achieve the purposes of the refuge; helps fulfill the mission of the Refuge System; maintains and, where appropriate, restores the ecological integrity of each refuge and the Refuge System; helps achieve the goals of the National Wilderness Preservation System; and meets other mandates.

The planning process for Stewart B. McKinney National Wildlife Refuge was begun in the spring of 2011. Public input is solicited by the Service via public meetings, email, and postal mail. Public scoping meetings were held in June, 2011 at the refuge headquarters in Westbrook, CT and at the Raymond Baldwin Center in Stratford, CT. The public comment period for the scoping phase of the project is open until July 20, 2011. There will be additional opportunities to comment on a draft plan which is expected to be available in March, 2012.

== See also ==
- List of National Wildlife Refuges
- Pleasure Beach, an area in Bridgeport, Connecticut, adjacent to the "Long Beach West" area in Stratford that is being considered for sale to the U.S. Fish and Wildlife Service.
