= Rogers Island (Connecticut) =

Private island in the Thimble Islands, Connecticut, US

Native name: Yon Comis Island
- Location within Connecticut

Geography
- Location: Long Island Sound, Connecticut
- Coordinates: 41°15′33″N 72°45′46″W
- Total islands: 1
- Area: 7.65 acres (3.10 ha)

Administration
- United States
- State: Connecticut

Demographics
- Population: 0 (permanent)

Rogers Island is a private island in the Thimble Islands archipelago off Stony Creek, a section of Branford, Connecticut, in New Haven County. Covering approximately 7.65 acres (3.10 ha) in Long Island Sound, it is one of the largest and most valuable of the Thimble Islands. The island is also historically known as Yon Comis Island and is dominated by a circa 1902 Tudor Revival mansion set among mature formal gardens.

== History ==
The Thimble Islands were well known to the Mattabesek people of the Algonquian nation, who referred to the archipelago as Kuttomquosh ("the beautiful sea rocks"). Dutch explorer Adriaen Block is credited as the first European to document the islands in 1614. The chain was first recorded under the name "Thimble Islands" in Branford town records in 1739, though earlier maps refer to them as the "Hundred Islands".

The island takes its modern name from John Rogers, one of the early English settlers and a founding figure of the town of Branford, whose family owned the island for more than a century following the original colonial land grants.

In 1902, Captain John Jay Phelps, a celebrated yachtsman and financier renowned as the first American to sail around the world, constructed the island's current Tudor Revival mansion as a summer retreat.

== Architecture and grounds ==
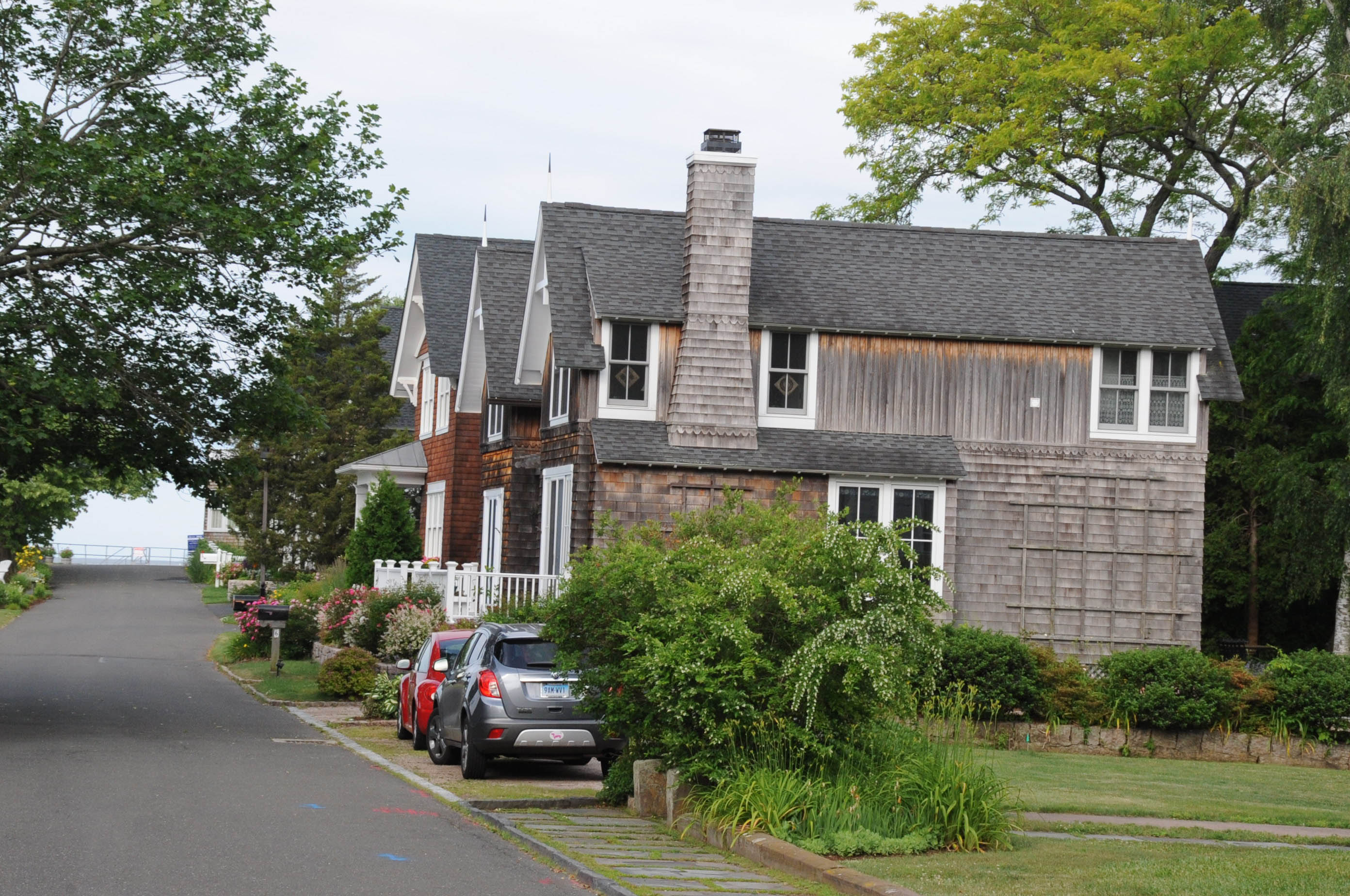
The Stony Creek–Thimble Islands Historic District, of which Rogers Island forms a part.

At the heart of the island stands an 8,746-square-foot (812.5 m^{2}) Tudor Revival house with 10 bedrooms and 7 bathrooms. The compound was designed as a self-contained private estate and includes extensive outbuildings and amenities. In addition to the main house, the estate features:

- A 4-bedroom guest cottage and 2-bedroom staff quarters
- A waterfront swimming pool with spa
- Tennis court and putting green
- Formal gardens, a koi pond, and a greenhouse
- A loft studio
- Two private docks — one for service use, one for private use
- A commercial-grade generator providing independent power

The island offers 360-degree views of Long Island Sound and has three private beaches. The estate is accessible by boat from a separate mainland property at 51 Flying Point Road in Stony Creek, which is included as part of the full offering and provides parking, staff housing, Tesla chargers, and a private dock.

== Ownership and sales history ==
In 2003, the island was purchased for $22.3 million by Christine Stoecklein Svenningsen, widow of party goods magnate John Svenningsen. The island subsequently changed hands again in August 2018 for $21.5 million. By May 2024, the property was listed for sale at an asking price of $29,995,000, with further improvements to the estate having been completed in the intervening years.

== See also ==
- Thimble Islands
- Branford, Connecticut
- Outer Lands
- Long Island Sound
