= Pot Island =

Island in New Haven County, Connecticut, United States

Coordinates: 41.24774°N 72.75498°W

Pot Island is one of the Thimble Islands in Branford, Connecticut. It was named for the numerous glacial potholes of various sizes.
