= Kings Island (Connecticut) =

Island in Connecticut, United States

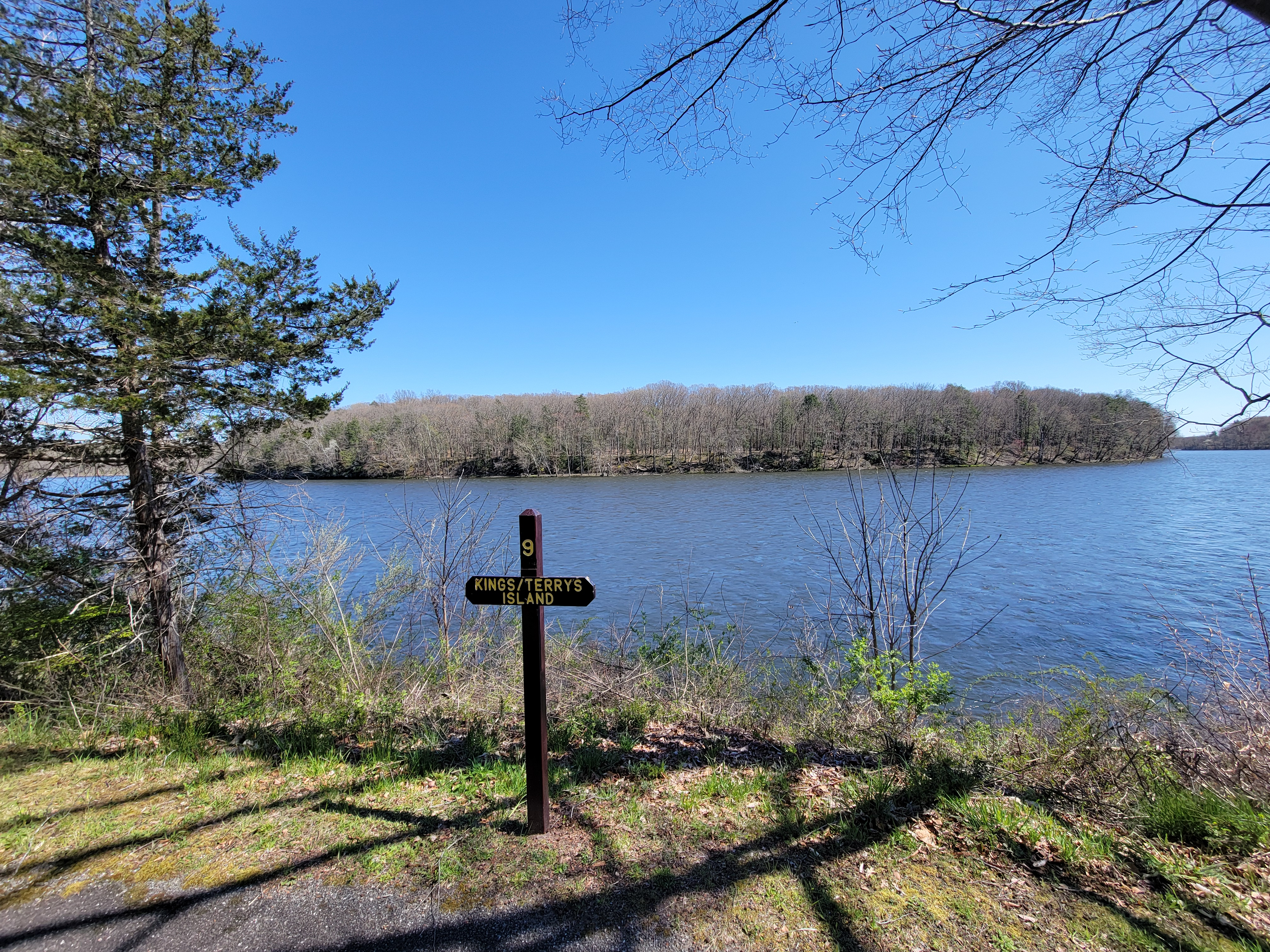
Kings Island

Kings Island is the largest island in the Connecticut River and is located between Enfield and Suffield, Connecticut in Hartford County. Other names include Colonel John Pynchon's Island, Copper Island, Devotion Island, General Lyman Island, Great Island, Lyman Island, and Terry's Island. The island is nearly a mile long and contains 104 acres.

== Geography ==
- 41°57′17″N 72°36′45″W

== History ==
The island was occupied by Native Americans as a springtime fishing spot for shad and salmon before the colonial period. Since then the island has changed ownership numerous times, including several colonial leaders. From 1787 to 1809 a sawmill was operated until it was washed away in a flood. Following the flood, the island was owned by its namesake family, the Kings, before being owned by the Terry family. The Terry family operated a farm which acted as a meeting place for Millerites.

Later the island was owned by a water-power syndicate which later became Eversource.

== Recreation ==
There is a 1.7 miles (2.7 km) hiking trail on the island along with a campground operated by the Appalachian Mountain Club.
