= List of Falkner Island Light keepers =

There have been many Falkner Island Light keepers throughout the history of the lighthouse. The Falkner Island Lighthouse is a lighthouse in Connecticut, United States, off Guilford Harbor on Long Island Sound. The lighthouse was constructed in 1802 and commissioned by President Thomas Jefferson, warning of dangerous shoals and shallows in the area. Falkner Island Light is the second oldest extant lighthouse in Connecticut and is listed on the National Register of Historic Places.

== List of keepers ==
Name	Year	Reference	Service Notes
Joseph Griffing	1802–1812		
Solomon Stone, Jr.	1812–1818		
Eli Kimberly	1818–1851		Appointed by President James Monroe; an incident on July 4, 1829 where drunken guests damaged the lighthouse equipment resulted in the passage of a law barring liquor sales at light stations. Raised twelve children with his wife Marion, on the island.
Oliver N. Brooks; Mary Brooks (assistant)	1851–1882; 1879–1882		In 1858, Oliver Brooks received a medal for heroism for rescuing five people from a ship grounded on the rocks near the lighthouse.
William Jones; Frank Parmelee (assistant)	1882 – c. 1890; 1884–1890		
Ernest Hermann	1890–1901		
Howard Poe; James Boyce (assistant); William J. Hannighan (assistant); Conrad Hawk (assistant)	1901–1909 c. 1905; 1906 c. 1909		
Elmer Rathbun	1909–1911		
Arthur Jensen (Unknown) Gregory (assistant); Frederick R. Campbell (assistant); Edward M. Grant (assistant); Herbert L. Greenwood (assistant)	April 1911 – July 1916; Unknown; 1912–1913; 1914; 1915–1916		Became keeper from 1916–1919.
Herbert L. Greenwood; Leonard Fuller (assistant)	1916–1919; April–November, 1919		Originally an assistant from 1915–1916. Became headkeeper in November 1919.
Leonard Fuller; William Hardwick (assistant); Adelard Bussiere (assistant)	November 1919 – October 1924 c.1920 October 1922 – May 1926		
Samuel Fuller; Fred Braffire (assistant)	October 1924 – March 1926 c.1924		Brother of Leonard Fuller.
Robert L. Howard; Arthur J. Munzner (a.k.a. Minzner) (assistant)	c. 1927–1928; May 1928 – June 1929		
Arthur J. Munzner (a.k.a. Minzner); George W. Pendrell (assistant)	June 1929 – 1935; February–October 1930		
George Zuius	1935 or 1936–1941		Last civilian Head Keeper of the lighthouse.
Harold Burbine (Coast Guard)	c. 1940s		
Stephen Talgo (Coast Guard); William Parker (Coast Guard assistant)	c. 1940s 1945–1946		Returned for 200th birthday celebration.
Gene Carney (Coast Guard)	1956 – November 1957		
Robert Baranksi (Coast Guard)	1957–1958		
Jim Marshall (Coast Guard); Marvin White (Coast Guard); Charles Green (Coast Guard)	1958–1962; 1961; 1961–1962		
Robert Ewing (Coast Guard)	c. 1965		
James Overton (Coast Guard Officer in Charge)	c. late 1960s		
Steve Martin (Coast Guard)	1966–1970		Gave a tour with future Falkner Island historian and Faulkner's Light Brigade founder, Joel Helander.
Vernon Durfee (Coast Guard) c.1973 Tony Fox (Coast Guard)	c.1973		
Mark Robinson (Coast Guard Officer in Charge); John Von Ogden (Coast Guard)	1975–1976; 1975–1976		Officer of the last crew Engineering officer
