= Money Island (Branford, Connecticut) =

Island in Connecticut, United States

Coordinates: 41.24955°N 72.75164°W

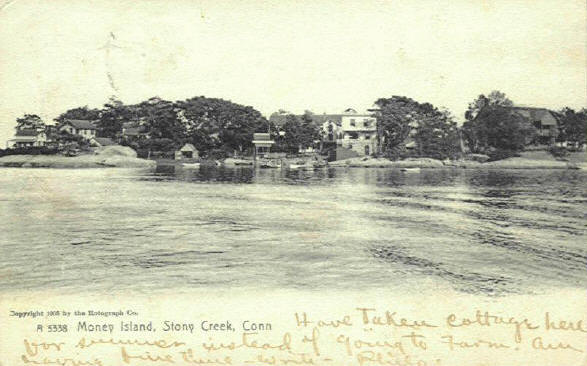
1905 postcard

Money Island is one of the Thimble Islands off Stony Creek, a section of Branford, Connecticut. It is named after a legend that Captain Kidd buried his treasure there. The island, 12 acres (49,000 m^{2}) in size, bears an entire village of 32 houses, a post office, and one library. Former buildings included a school, a church, and a grocery store. There are three roads and several piers. At this time, none of the houses are occupied year-round.

The three roads are Montowese Avenue, Pequot Avenue, and Kidd's Lane.

== See also ==
- Thimble Islands
- Outer Lands
