= Thimble Islands =

Archipelago in Long Island Sound near Branford, Connecticut

The Thimbles

- Location within Connecticut

Geography
- Location: Branford, Connecticut
- Coordinates: 41°15′52″N 72°45′11″W
- Total islands: 100+

Administration
- United States
- State: Connecticut

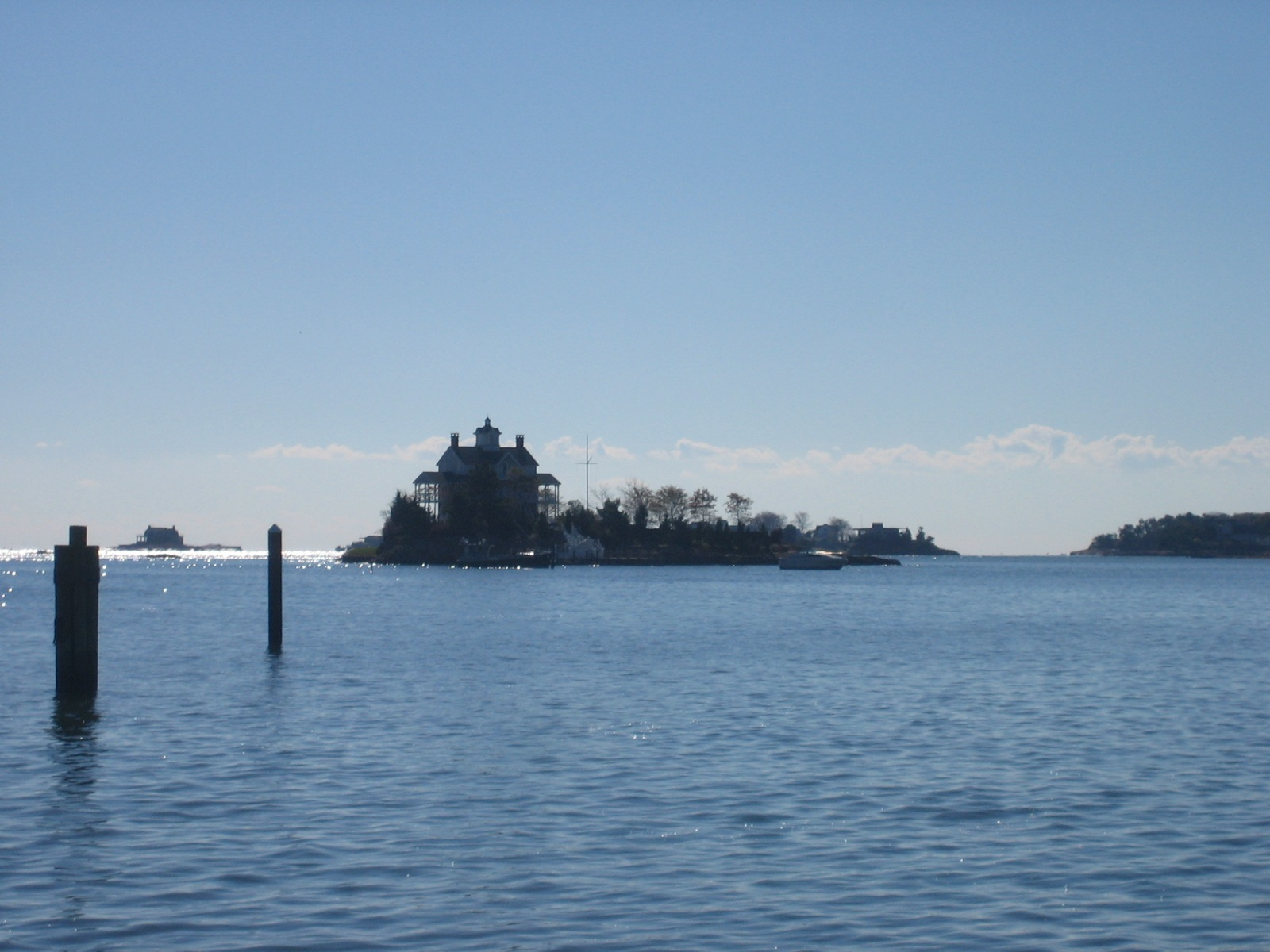
Thimble Islands.

The Thimble Islands is an archipelago consisting of small islands in Long Island Sound, located in and around the harbor of Stony Creek in the southeast corner of Branford, Connecticut. The islands are under the jurisdiction of the United States with security provided by the town of Branford police and the US Coast Guard.

The archipelago of islands made up of pink Stony Creek granite bedrock were once the tops of hills prior to the last ice age. As a result, the Thimble Islands are much more stable than most other islands in Long Island Sound, which are terminal moraines of rubble deposited by retreating glaciers.

== History ==
Known to the Mattabeseck Indians as Kuttomquosh, "the beautiful sea rocks," they consist of a jumble of granite rocks, ledges and outcroppings resulting from glaciation, numbering between 100 and 365 depending on where the line is drawn between an island and a mere rock. The islands serve as a rest stop for migrating seals.

The first European to discover the islands was Adrian Block in 1614. Legend says that Captain Kidd buried his treasure here, causing intermittent interest among treasure hunters who believe they have unearthed a clue to its location, although more interest is generally paid to Gardiners Island, 30 miles (48 km) away.

The islands themselves - long prized by sailors on the Sound as a sheltered deep-water anchorage - comprise 23 that are inhabited (most of them wooded), numerous barren rocks and hundreds of reefs visible only at low tide.

Although they are said to be named for the thimbleberry, a relative of the black raspberry, that plant is seldom seen in the area, and is more frequent in northern New England. Other species of blackberry and raspberry, however, are sometimes referred to by residents of the area as thimbleberries.

In Reflections in Bullough's Pond, Diana Muir describes the important nineteenth century oyster farming industry that thrived around these islands. Muir spent childhood summers on Lewis Island in a mansion built by an oystering fortune.

By 2007, a private buyer, Christine Svenningsen, had purchased ten of the islands, including Rogers Island. Over the years some have been listed for sale, including Wheelers Island, Belden Island and Jepson Island. Belden Island was sold for $1.25 million by 2021, whereas Jepson Island was sold for just $715,000 by 2020. Wheelers Island was originally called Page’s Island; it was purchased from Alonson Hall by Henry B. Frisbie in 1865 and then by Svenningsen in 1988. The island was sold for $2,999,000 in early 2022.

=== Historic district ===
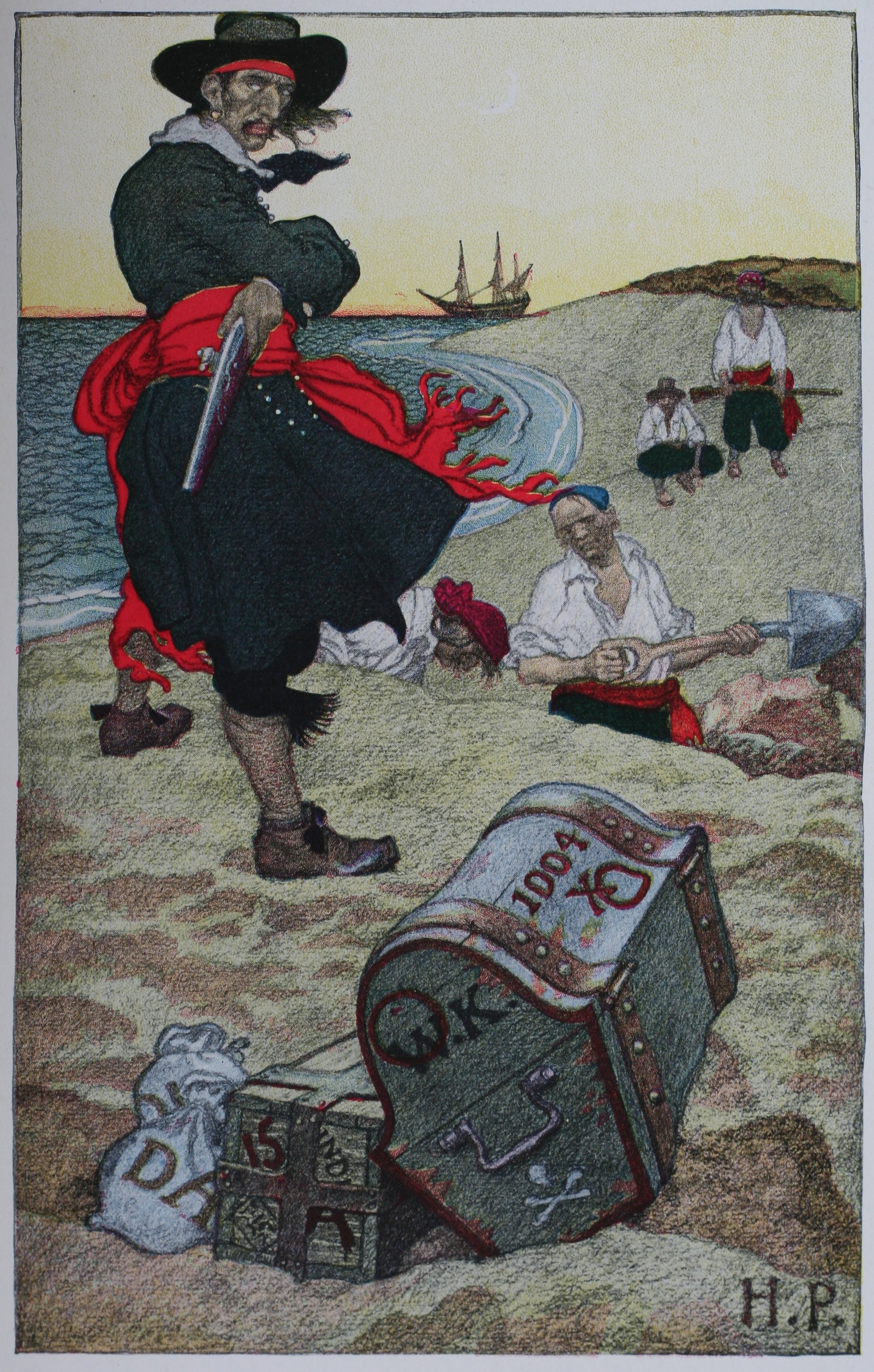
Captain William Kidd may have buried his treasure or kept a base in the Thimble Islands.

The Thimble Islands are included in the Stony Creek–Thimble Islands Historic District, a historic district that was listed on the National Register of Historic Places in 1988. The 1,400-acre (570 ha) area of the district includes the Thimble Islands plus the access road to the islands (Thimble Islands Road between Route 146 and Long Island Sound) and surrounding properties in the Stony Creek section of Branford. It includes the Stick Style House, which is separately listed on the National Register.

The historic district area includes 346 buildings and four other structures. Georgian architecture is represented.

== Islands ==
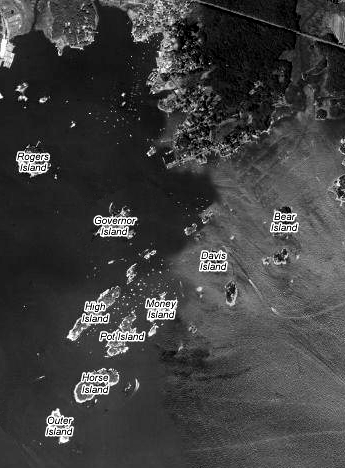
Satellite image of the Thimble Islands with the largest islands labeled.

The largest Thimble Islands are:

- Horse Island, the largest island at 17 acres (6.9 ha), is owned by Yale University and is maintained as an ecological laboratory by Yale's Peabody Museum of Natural History.
- Money Island (12 acres / 4.9 ha), bears an entire village of 32 houses and a library.
- Governor Island (10 acres / 4.07 ha) has 14 houses.
- Rogers Island (7.75 acres / 3.14 ha), also known as Yon Comis Island, one of several Thimbles owned by Greg Jensen, Bridgewater
- Bear Island is home to a granite quarry, which exported high-quality stone to such constructions as the Lincoln Memorial, Grant's Tomb, and the base of the Statue of Liberty. A much larger quarry, Stony Creek Quarry, just north on the mainland is still working and supplied the distinctive pink/orange Stony Creek granite for the Brooklyn Bridge, Grand Central Terminal, and Columbia University.
- Davis Island, President William Taft established his "Summer White House" on Davis Island for two years
- High Island
- Pot Island
- Outer Island is used by Southern Connecticut State University for ecological studies and is part of Stewart B. McKinney National Wildlife Refuge. Outer Island can be visited by the public and is staffed by volunteers during the summer season.

Other named Thimble Islands are Hen Island, East Stooping Bush Island, Potato Island (also known as Dove Island), Smith Island, Cut in Two Island (East and West), tiny Phelps Island, Wheeler Island aka Ghost Island, Mother in Law Island aka Prudden Island, West Crib Island, Dogfish Island, East Crib Island, Little Pumpkin Island(also known as Wayland island), Lewis Island, Kidd's Island, Reel Island, Beldens Island, Burr Island, Jepson Island, Wayland Island, and Frisbie Island, which is maintained as a sanctuary for wild birds.

=== Kidd Island ===
Named after the famed Captain William Kidd, Kidd's Island is one of the many landforms that bear his name in the Thimble Islands off of Stony Creek in Branford, Connecticut, as well as Kidd's Harbor, Kidds Lane, and Money Island, which was named for his treasure. The Thimbles were a favorite roaming ground of his, and he may have, as local legend states, buried some of his riches here.

== Environment ==
As with most of southern New England, the ecology of the islands has been heavily influenced by thousands of years of intermittent human occupation. One particularly intrusive event was the felling of all the trees on every island during the American Revolutionary War to eliminate hiding places for British ships.

The plant species of the islands were extensively studied by Yale botanist Lauren Brown; although the islands represent a unique ecological niche, combining a thin layer of soil, a high concentration of salt, and extreme exposure to weather, no unique, unusual, or rare plant species have been found; instead, the shrubs and trees represented are generally similar to those on the nearby mainland, selecting only those that reproduce by berries or other fruit carried by birds to the islands, for example raspberries, blackberries, sassafras, cherries, etc. The exception is large stands of pitch pine, whose airborne seeds are apparently able to travel from the mainland. Poison ivy has established itself in many sites on the islands, in some places thick enough to forbid entire areas from human intrusion.

In contrast to the mainland, oaks are particularly absent, even though blue jays are capable of ingesting acorns and carrying them from place to place. Nevertheless, some infrequent oak, maple, beech, and other trees do appear in scattered locations about the islands; from their locations they appear to have been deliberately planted by residents, or they are the descendants of such plantings. Other cultivated plants, such as ivy and some types of climbing roses, have established themselves on the islands to the point of becoming invasive species.

Mammals other than human beings are generally not found on the islands; although a rare squirrel or deer may be seen, they appear to be isolated arrivals, and no mammalian populations have established themselves other than bats, voles, and some mouse and rat infestations closely associated with the human habitations. Snakes are occasionally sighted; it is not known whether they arrived on their own, or were carried in as stowaways with loads of cargo.

== Culture and recreation ==
The inhabited islands bear a total of 81 houses: 14 islands have only one, one (Governor) has 14, one (Money) has 32, and the rest have between two and six. The houses are built in a variety of styles, ranging from a 27-room Tudor mansion, with tennis and basketball courts and a caretaker's residence on 7.75 acres (31,400 m^{2}) on Rogers Island, to small summer cottages built on stilts or small clusters of buildings connected by wooden footbridges. Some of the houses cover a small island completely, while Money Island, 12 acres (49,000 m²) in size, bears an entire village of 32 houses, a church and post office buildings, concealed among tall trees. Some of the houses were once occupied year-long, but now are only used in the summer. The exposed nature of the houses makes them dangerous during storms; local residents still talk about the hurricane of 1938, which killed seven people. The exclusivity of the houses has made them quite expensive, therefore residents are divided between local families who have owned their homes for generations, and more recent residents who tend to be wealthy. The least expensive houses, on Money Island, are appraised at about $600,000.

Only six islands get electrical power through underwater cables from the shore; the rest use some combination of generator, solar power, batteries or kerosene and propane. About half the islands get fresh water through underwater pipes from shore; the rest use wells or rainwater, or have containers of water delivered. No sewers serve the islands, requiring the use of septic tanks for all sewage treatment.

Current and past well-known residents of the islands range from General Tom Thumb on Cut in Two Island East to Garry Trudeau, Doonesbury cartoonist and Jane Pauley, broadcast journalist. President William Taft established his "Summer White House" on Davis Island for two years. Actor Frank Converse purchased a 2-acre (8,100 m^{2}) Thimble Island in 1975. Residents of the area tend to protect the privacy of island dwellers, obeying the 5-mile (8.0 km)-an-hour speed limit for motorboats and never landing without an invitation, though trespassers are often cited and ticketed. The Thimble Islands Home Owners Association advises motorboats to stay at least 50 feet offshore other islands.

Sailing through the islands can be tricky for those unfamiliar with the area, because of the disorientation caused by the myriad of similar islands (particularly at night), the hidden underwater rocks and ledges, and the complex currents caused by the tides acting on the channels between the rocks.

In the warm season, a small ferry, Thimble Island Ferry Service, transports people and goods between the islands and the Stony Creek harbor on the hour from 8:00 AM to 8:00 PM. Prior to telephones, islanders hung a red flag on the dock to request a ferry visit. An on-call water taxi has recently been added, and three take passengers on scenic cruises. Kayak tours are also available. Many residents have their own boats, and some occasionally arrive by seaplane or by helicopter.

=== Tourism ===
During the spring, summer, and fall, the Thimble Islands are a popular destination for sightseeing cruises departing from the Stony Creek town dock. The Volsunga IV is one of the commercial tour boats operating in the archipelago, offering approximately 45- minute narrated cruises that interpret the islands' geology, maritime history, Victorian-era summer cottages, and local legends. The vessel also operates private charter cruises and has become one of several long-standing tour operators introducing visitors to the Thimble Islands from the mainland.

=== Sailing Club ===
The Thimble Island Sailing Club is a club of more than 100 members centered in the Thimbles. Currently, they race JYs for younger children, Lasers, Cat Boats and J22s. Formerly, they raced Cook 11s and Blue Jays. Races are every Saturday or Sunday during summer.

== See also ==
- Outer Lands
