= Outer Lands =

Archipelagic region off the southern coast of New England in the United States

- Terminal moraine archipelagic region
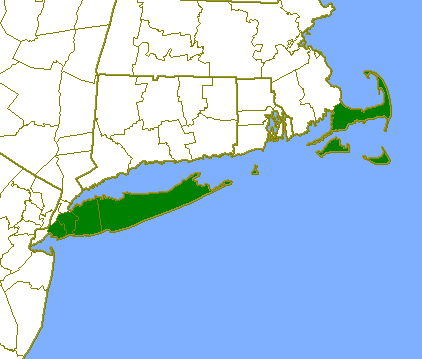
- Map of the Outer Lands of New York and New England colored in green
- Coordinates: 41°9′51.05″N 71°34′53.12″W
- Location: Southern New England, Coastal New York State

Dimensions
  - Width: 370 km (230 mi)
- Islands and Landforms: Long Island, Outer Barrier, Thimble Islands, Block Island, Narragansett Bay Islands, Elizabeth Islands, Martha’s Vineyard, Nomans Land, Nantucket, Cape Cod

The Outer Lands is the prominent terminal moraine archipelagic region off the southern coast of New England in the United States. This eight-county region of Massachusetts, Rhode Island, and New York comprises the peninsula of Cape Cod and the islands of Nantucket, Martha's Vineyard, the Elizabeth Islands, Block Island, and Long Island, as well as surrounding islands and islets.

Though the existence of an arc or chain of islands in this archipelago is widely acknowledged by geographers, it is rarely given a specific name; occasionally a descriptive term such as southern New England islands or a technical term such as Cape Cod/Long Island ecoregion or Long Island–Cape Cod Coastal Lowland is used. The Isles of Stirling was the name granted in 1635 when the islands came into the possession of William Alexander, 1st Earl of Stirling. "Outer Lands" is a term popularized by author Dorothy Sterling in her 1967 natural history guide of the same name, and used by later natural history authors such as Patrick J. Lynch.

== Divisions ==
The Massachusetts section is often called the "Cape and Islands", with the "Islands" subregion very specifically referring to Martha's Vineyard, Nantucket and other smaller islands in Dukes and Nantucket counties.

Long Island is often informally considered a part of the "New York islands" alongside Staten Island and Manhattan. These islands are geographically contiguous with the broader region. (The insular Massachusetts sections were actually part of the Province of New York for most of the late 17th century.)

Other islands in Long Island Sound and Rhode Island Sound (Narragansett Bay Islands) are also often included in the region.

More rarely, Sandy Hook in New Jersey is included.

== Geology ==
The Outer Lands forms the insular northeasternmost extension of North America's Atlantic coastal plain. The islands of the Outer Lands were formed of terminal moraines deposited on a series of cuestas by the recession of the Laurentide Ice Sheet during the Wisconsin glaciation.

Some of the islands are included in the archipelago due to proximity, despite key geological differences, such as Manhattan, which is instead part of the Manhattan Prong.

The islands are separated from the mainland by a series of bays and sounds that used to make up Lake Connecticut, Lake Narragansett, and other glacial lakes.

== Ecology ==
For eastern Long Island and areas east, the region is designated Environmental Protection Agency ecoregion 84 for the Atlantic coastal pine barrens, with the majority 84a for "Cape Cod/Long Island", and along the Long Island south shore 84c for "Barrier Islands/Coastal Marshes". Western Long Island and along the north shore is largely 59g for "Long Island Sound Coastal Lowland", a part of the broader Northeastern Coastal Zone.

The region is designated the "Long Island-Cape Cod Coastal Lowland", Major Land Resource Area 149B, by the United States Department of Agriculture, which also includes Staten Island.

== Culture ==
The region has historically had a strong maritime culture, with an emphasis on fishing. From eastern Long Island and further to the east, much of the region has in recent decades taken on a summer colony character.

== See also ==
- Atlantic coastal pine barrens
- Cape and Islands
- Narragansett Bay
- New York Islands
- Outer Barrier Islands
- Sandy Hook, New Jersey
- Thimble Islands
