= Stony Creek (Branford) =

Village in Branford, Connecticut

Coordinates: 41°15′52″N 72°44′46″W

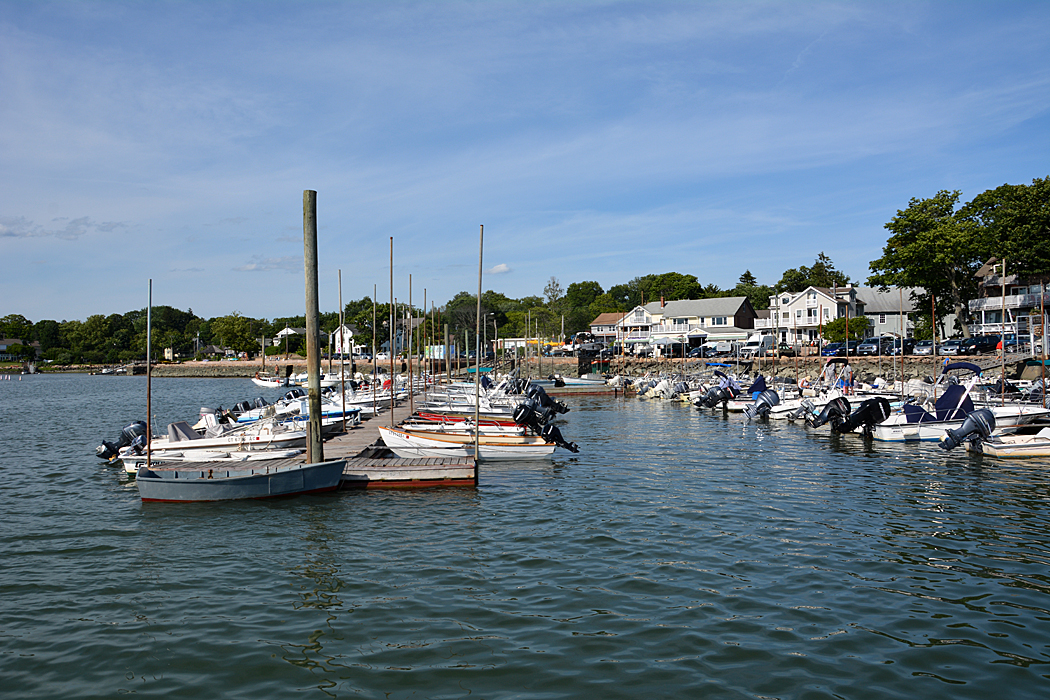
Stony Creek harbor

Stony Creek is a coastal village located the southeastern section of Branford, Connecticut, United States, centered on a harbor on Long Island Sound. Stony Creek has the ambiance of a small seaside village which retains its roots as a summer vacation location with old Victorian hotels and a working granite quarry. It is known for the Thimble Islands an archipelago of glacial rocks, ranging from 17 acres (6.9 ha) down to stepping-stone size, at the harbor's mouth. Despite their small size, they possess a wealth of history and local lore, as well as providing pleasant scenery. The islands are privately owned but visitors may get an up-close view via several tour boats which run in the spring, summer and autumn. In the past, Stony Creek was also known for lobstering and oystering, but these industries have all but vanished in recent decades.

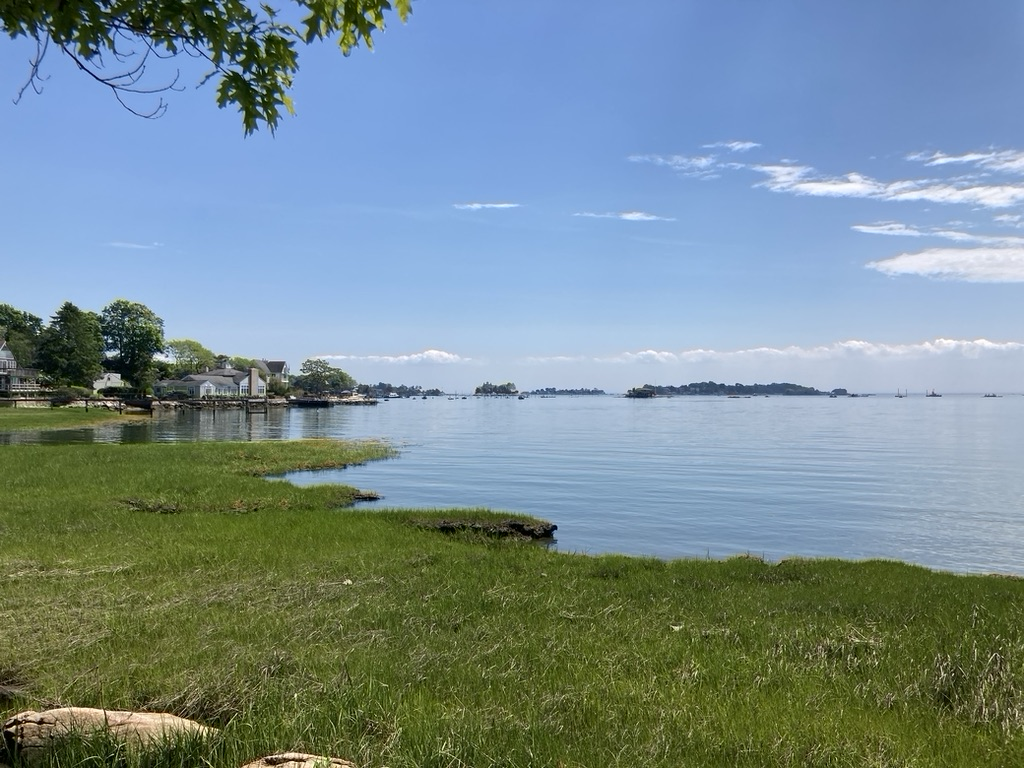
View of harbor from the Branford Trolley Trail

The village which has several unique attractions: the Thimble Islands, the Stony Creek Legacy Theater, Stony Creek Museum as well as a small public beach, town docks with boat launch, playground and public library. Three local companies offer boat tours and charters of the Thimble Islands from March thru October.

Stony Creek is also home to the all-male Stony Creek Fife & Drum Corps, which was founded in 1886. The Corps practices weekly at the renovated Seaside Hall. On occasional summer evenings, the Corps plays aboard the island tour boat, much to the delight of the local residents. In the past, the Corps received many awards and honors, including participating in President Eisenhower's inaugural parade. Stony Creek is also home to the only all-female fife and drum corps, Totoket Ancient Fife & Drum Corps, who holds their practice at Seaside Hall.

A large quarry is still working and supplies the distinctive pink/orange Stony Creek granite. This granite was used for the Brooklyn Bridge, the Stony Creek Library, and the newest House Office Building in Washington, D.C. It can also be seen in the South Station terminal in Boston, Grand Central Terminal in NYC, and in the base of the Statue of Liberty.

== Notable people ==
- Herbert V. Camp (1935–2022), Connecticut Representative, graduate of Wesleyan University and Columbia Law School.
- Joseph Stamler (1911–1988), New Jersey Superior Court judge and professor at Rutgers University
- Ayn Rand, novelist; spent the summer in Stony Creek in the late 1930s while her husband, Frank O'Connor did summer stock; she developed key elements of the plot of her novel The Fountainhead there
- J. Andre Smith, American artist
- Thomas A. Steitz (1940–2018), late-20th-century scientist, shared a Nobel Prize in Chemistry
- Susan Weil (b. 1930), American artist
