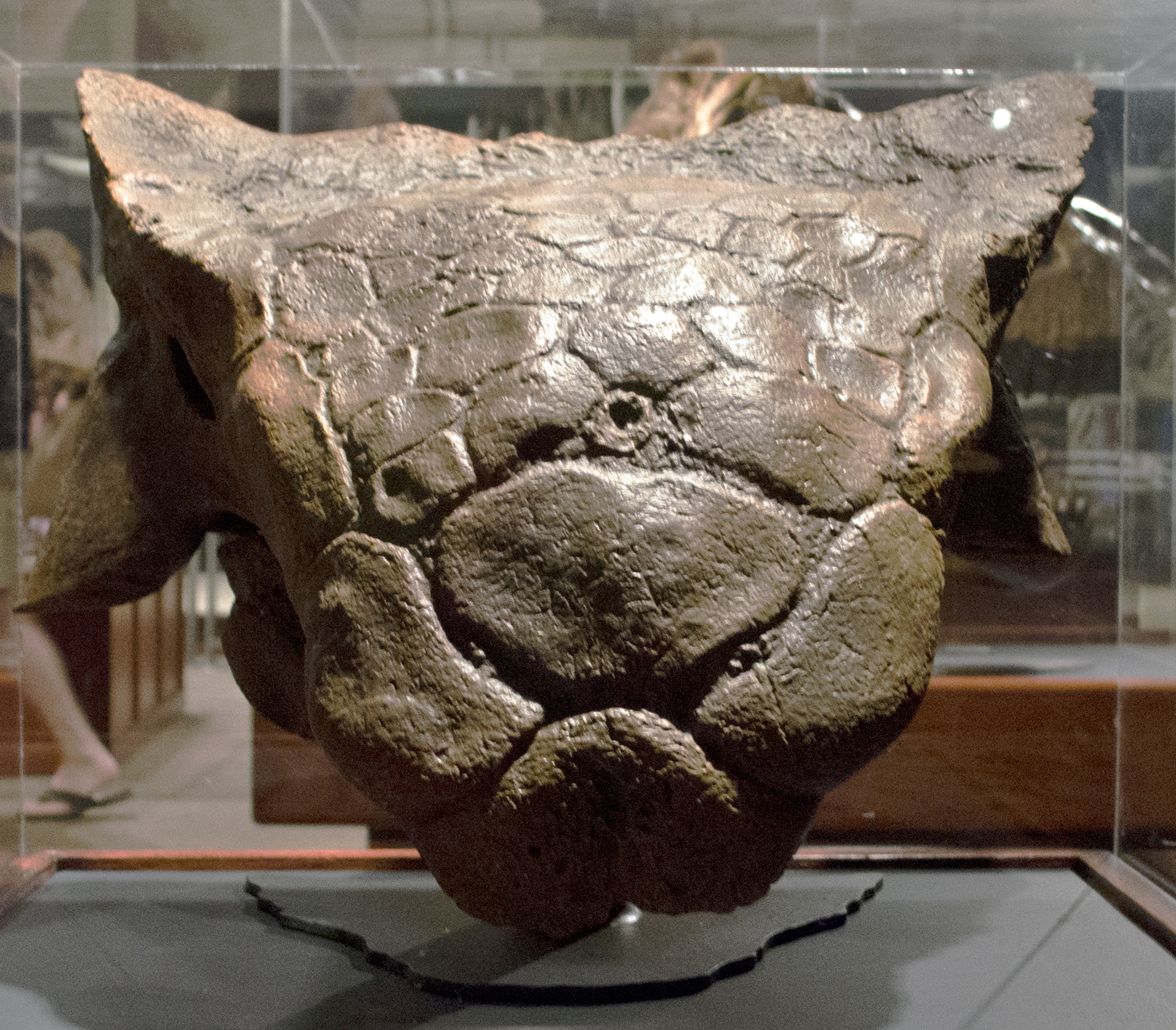
- Cast of Ankylosaurus skull (AMNH 5214) in front view, at Museum of the Rockies

Scientific classification
- Kingdom: Animalia
- Phylum: Chordata
- Class: Reptilia
- Clade: Dinosauria
- Clade: †Ornithischia
- Clade: †Thyreophora
- Clade: †Ankylosauria
- Family: †Ankylosauridae
- Subfamily: †Ankylosaurinae
- Tribe: †Ankylosaurini
- Genus: †Ankylosaurus; Brown, 1908
- Species: †A. magniventris

Binomial name
- †Ankylosaurus magniventris Brown, 1908

= Ankylosaurus =

Ankylosaurus Temporal range: Late Cretaceous (Maastrichtian), 70–66 Ma

Ankylosaurid dinosaur genus from the Late Cretaceous Period

Ankylosaurus (Note: Pronounced /ˌæŋkəloʊˈsɔːrəs/ ANG-kə-loh-SOR-əs) is a genus of armored dinosaur. Its fossils have been found in geological formations dating to the very end of the Cretaceous Period, about 70-66 million years ago, in western North America, making it among the last of the non-avian dinosaurs. It was named by Barnum Brown in 1908; it is monotypic, containing only A. magniventris. The generic name means "fused" or "bent lizard", and the specific name means "great belly". A handful of specimens have been excavated to date, but a complete skeleton has not been discovered. Though other members of Ankylosauria are represented by more extensive fossil material, Ankylosaurus is often considered the archetypal member of its group, despite having some unusual features.

Possibly the largest known ankylosaurid, Ankylosaurus is estimated to have been between 6 and 8 m (20 and 26 ft) long and to have weighed between 4.8 and 8 t (5.3 and 8.8 short tons). It was quadrupedal, with a broad, robust body. It had a wide, low skull, with two horns pointing backward from the back of the head, and two horns below these that pointed backward and down. Unlike other ankylosaurs, its nostrils faced sideways rather than towards the front. The front part of the jaws was covered in a beak, with rows of small, leaf-shaped teeth farther behind it. It was covered in armor plates, or osteoderms, with bony half-rings covering the neck, and had a large club on the end of its tail. Bones in the skull and other parts of the body were fused, increasing their strength, and this feature is the source of the genus name.

Ankylosaurus is a member of the family Ankylosauridae, and its closest relatives appear to be Anodontosaurus and Euoplocephalus. Ankylosaurus is thought to have been a slow-moving animal, able to make quick movements when necessary. Its broad muzzle indicates it was a non-selective browser. Sinuses and nasal chambers in the snout may have been for heat and water balance or may have played a role in vocalization. The tail club is thought to have been used in defense against predators or in intraspecific combat. Specimens of Ankylosaurus have been found in the Hell Creek, Lance, Scollard, Frenchman, and Ferris formations, but it appears to have been rare in its environment. Although it lived alongside Denversaurus, a nodosaurid ankylosaur, their ranges and ecological niches do not appear to have overlapped, and Ankylosaurus may have inhabited upland areas. Ankylosaurus also lived alongside dinosaurs such as Tyrannosaurus, Triceratops, and Edmontosaurus.

== History of discovery ==
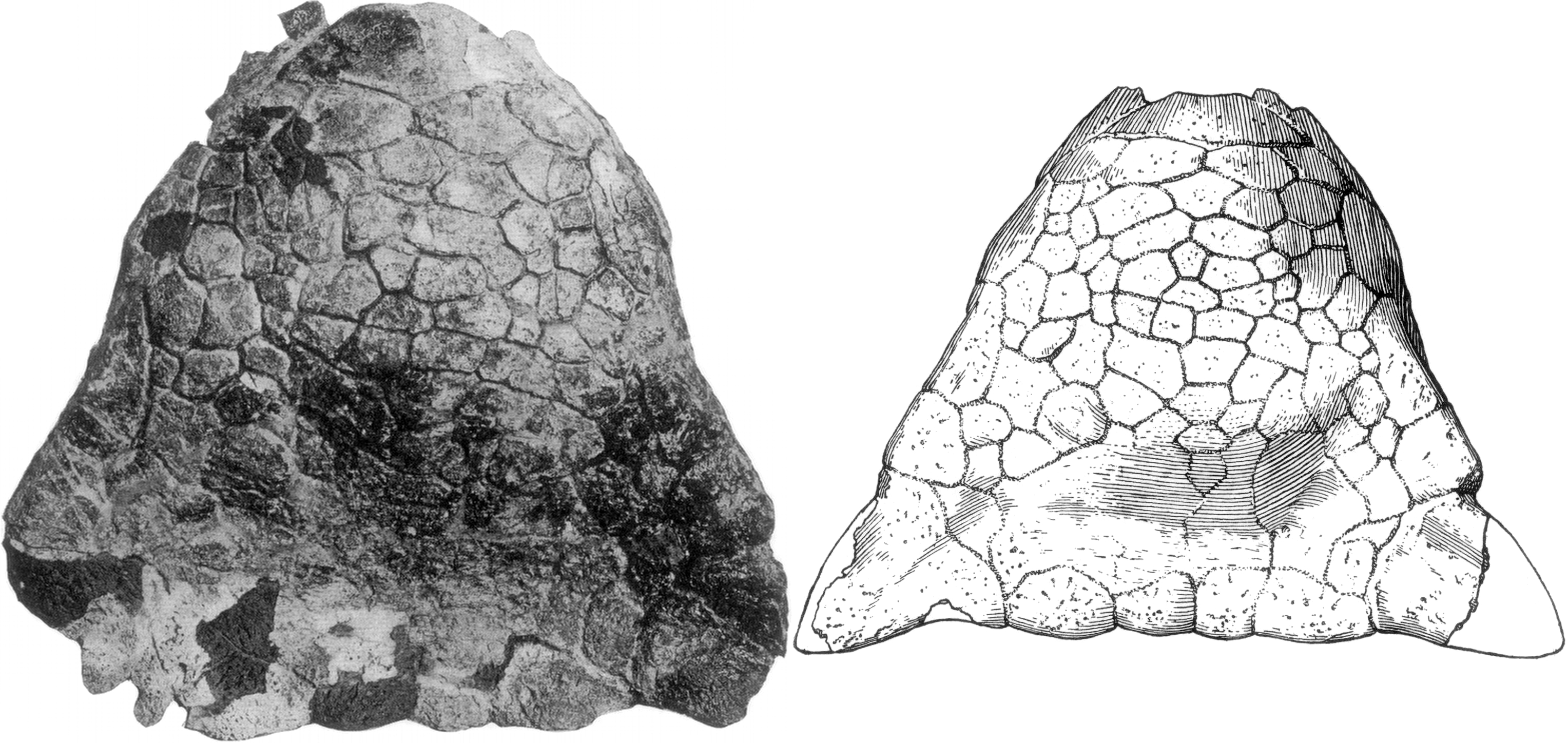
Skull of holotype AMNH 5895 and reconstruction diagram of same

In 1906, an American Museum of Natural History expedition led by American paleontologist Barnum Brown discovered the type specimen of Ankylosaurus magniventris (AMNH 5895) in the Hell Creek Formation, near Gilbert Creek, Montana. The specimen (found by collector Peter Kaisen) consisted of the upper part of a skull, two teeth, part of the shoulder girdle, cervical, dorsal, and caudal vertebrae, ribs, and more than thirty osteoderms (armor plates). Brown scientifically described the animal in 1908; the generic name is derived from the Greek words αγκυλος ankulos ('bent' or 'crooked'), referring to the medical term ankylosis, the stiffness produced by the fusion of bones in the skull and body, and σαυρος sauros ('lizard'). The name can be translated as "fused lizard", "stiff lizard", or "curved lizard". The type species name, magniventris, is derived from the Latin: magnus ('great') and Latin: venter ('belly'), referring to the great width of the animal's body.

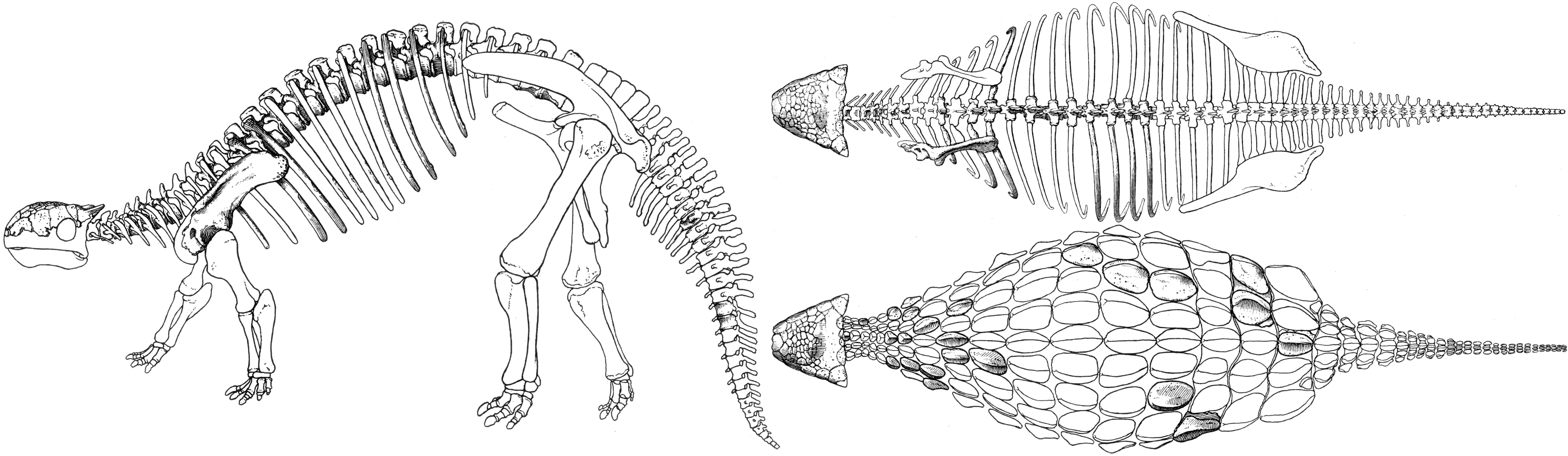
1908 skeletal reconstructions of the holotype, with missing parts inaccurately restored after Stegosaurus

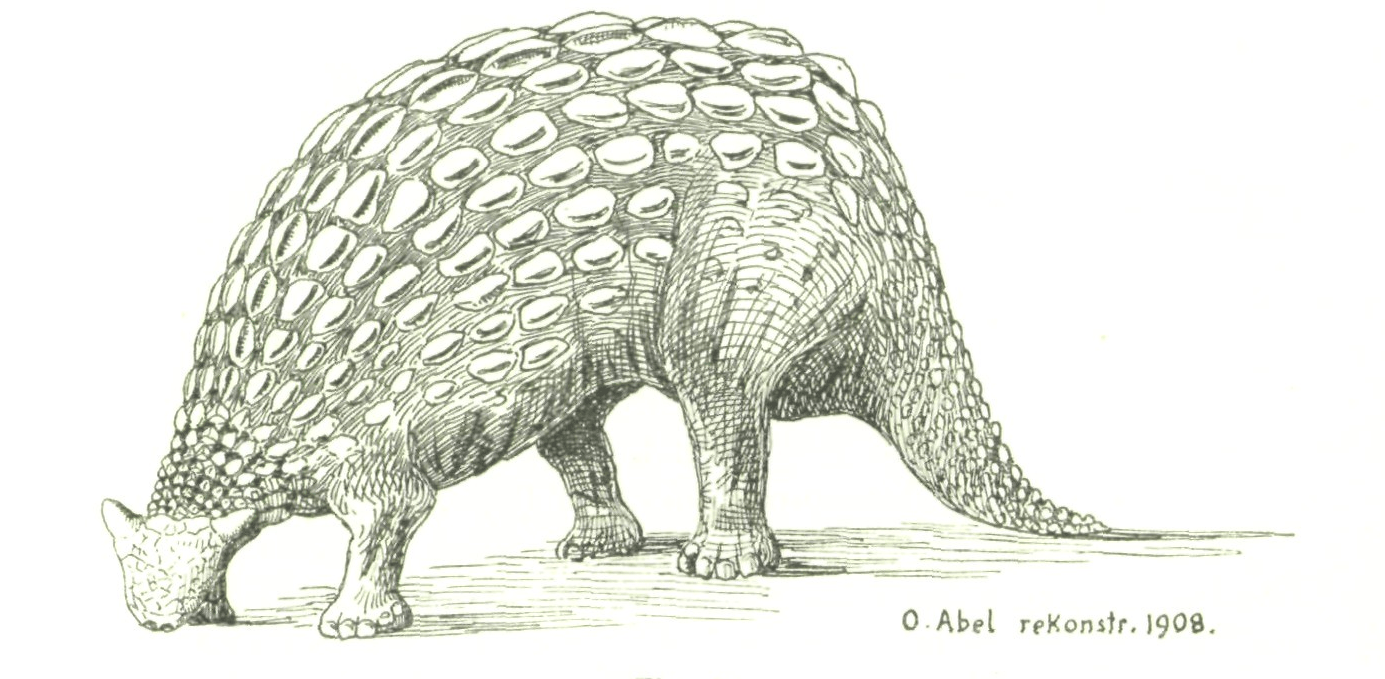
Othenio Abel's outdated 1908 life restoration

The skeletal reconstruction accompanying the 1908 description restored the missing parts in a fashion similar to Stegosaurus, and Brown likened the result to the extinct armored mammal Glyptodon. In contrast to modern depictions, Brown's stegosaur-like reconstruction showed robust forelimbs, a strongly arched back, a pelvis with prongs projecting forwards from the ilium and pubis, as well as a short, drooping tail without a tail club, which was unknown at the time. Brown also reconstructed the armor plates in parallel rows running down the back; this arrangement was purely hypothetical. Brown's reconstruction became highly influential, and restorations of the animal based on his diagram were published as late as the 1980s. In a 1908 review of Brown's Ankylosaurus description, the American paleontologist Samuel Wendell Williston criticized the skeletal reconstruction as being based on too few remains, and claimed that Ankylosaurus was merely a synonym of the genus Stegopelta, which Williston had named in 1905. Williston also stated that a skeletal reconstruction of the related Polacanthus by Hungarian paleontologist Franz Nopcsa was a better example of how ankylosaurs would have appeared in life. The claim of synonymy was not accepted by other researchers, and the two genera are now considered distinct.

Brown had collected 77 osteoderms while excavating a Tyrannosaurus specimen in the Lance Formation of Wyoming in 1900. He mentioned these osteoderms (specimen AMNH 5866) in his description of Ankylosaurus but thought they belonged to the Tyrannosaurus instead. Paleontologist Henry Fairfield Osborn also expressed this view when he described the Tyrannosaurus specimen as the now synonymous genus Dynamosaurus in 1905. More recent examination has shown them to be similar to those of Ankylosaurus; it seems that Brown had compared them with some Euoplocephalus osteoderms, which had been erroneously cataloged as belonging to Ankylosaurus at the AMNH.

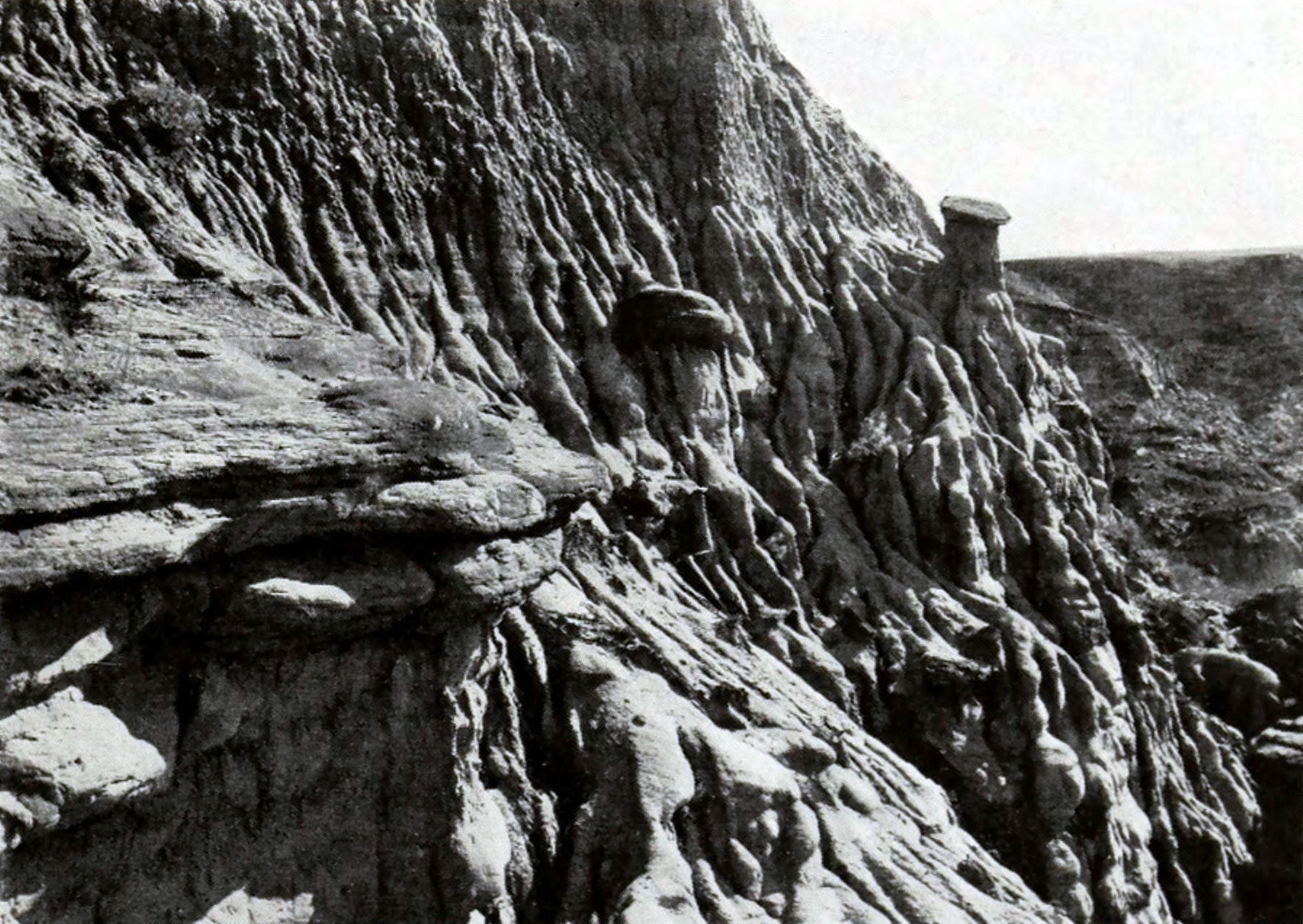
Excavation of AMNH 5214 (center, above the pick), 1910

In 1910, another AMNH expedition led by Brown discovered an Ankylosaurus specimen (AMNH 5214) in the Scollard Formation by the Red Deer River in Alberta, Canada. This specimen included a complete skull, mandibles, the first and only tail club known of this genus, as well as ribs, vertebrae, limb bones, and armor. In 1947 the American fossil collectors Charles M. Sternberg and T. Potter Chamney collected a skull and mandible (specimen CMN 8880, formerly NMC 8880), 1 kilometer (5/8 mile) north of where the 1910 specimen was found. This is the largest-known Ankylosaurus skull, but it is damaged in places. A section of caudal vertebrae (specimen CCM V03) was discovered in the 1960s in the Powder River drainage, Montana, part of the Hell Creek Formation. In addition to these five incomplete specimens, many other isolated osteoderms and teeth have been found.

In 1990, American paleontologist Walter P. Coombs pointed out that the teeth of two skulls assigned to A. magniventris differed from those of the holotype specimen in some details, and though he expressed a "considerate temptation" to name a new species of Ankylosaurus for these, he refrained from doing so, as the range of variation in the species was not completely documented. He also raised the possibility that the two teeth associated with the holotype specimen perhaps did not belong to it, as they were found in matrix within the nasal chambers. The American paleontologist Kenneth Carpenter accepted the teeth as belonging to A. magniventris in 2004, and that all the specimens belonged to the same species, noting that the teeth of other ankylosaurs are highly variable.

Most of the known Ankylosaurus specimens were not scientifically described at length, though several paleontologists planned to do so until Carpenter redescribed the genus in 2004. In 2017 the Canadian paleontologists Victoria M. Arbour and Jordan Mallon redescribed the genus in light of newer ankylosaur discoveries, including elements of the holotype that had not been previously mentioned in the literature (such as parts of the skull and the cervical half-rings). They concluded that though Ankylosaurus is the best-known member of its group, it was bizarre in comparison to related ankylosaurs, and therefore not representative of the group. In spite of its familiarity, it is known from far fewer remains than its closest relatives.

== Description ==
Size of the smallest (AMNH 5214) and largest (CMN 8880) known specimens, compared to a human

Ankylosaurus was the largest-known ankylosaurine dinosaur and possibly the largest ankylosaurid. In 2004 Carpenter estimated that the individual with the largest-known skull (specimen CMN 8880), which is 64.5 cm (2 ft 1.4 in) long and 74.5 cm (2 ft 5.3 in) wide, was about 6.25 m (20 ft 6 in) long and had a hip height of about 1.7 m (5 ft 7 in). The smallest-known skull (specimen AMNH 5214) is 55.5 cm (1 ft 9.9 in) long and 64.5 cm (2 ft 1.4 in) wide, and Carpenter estimated that it measured about 5.4 m (17 ft 9 in) long and about 1.4 m (4 ft 7 in) tall at the hips. The English paleontologist Roger B. J. Benson and colleagues estimated the weight for AMNH 5214 at 4.78 t (5.27 short tons) in 2014.

In 2017, based on comparisons with more complete ankylosaurines, Arbour and Mallon estimated a length of 7.56 to 9.99 m (24 ft 9 1/2 in to 32 ft 9 1/2 in) for CMN 8880, and 6.02 to 7.95 m (19 ft 9 in to 26 ft 1 in) for AMNH 5214. Though the latter is the smallest specimen of Ankylosaurus, its skull is still larger than those of any other ankylosaurins. A few other ankylosaurs reached about 6 m (20 ft) in length. Because the vertebrae of AMNH 5214 are not significantly larger than those of other ankylosaurines, Arbour and Mallon considered their upper range estimate of nearly 10 meters (33 ft) for large Ankylosaurus too long, and suggested a length of 8 m (26 ft) instead. Arbour and Mallon estimated a weight of 4.78 t (5.27 short tons) for AMNH 5214, and tentatively estimated the weight of CMN 8880 at 7.95 t (8.76 short tons).

=== Skull ===
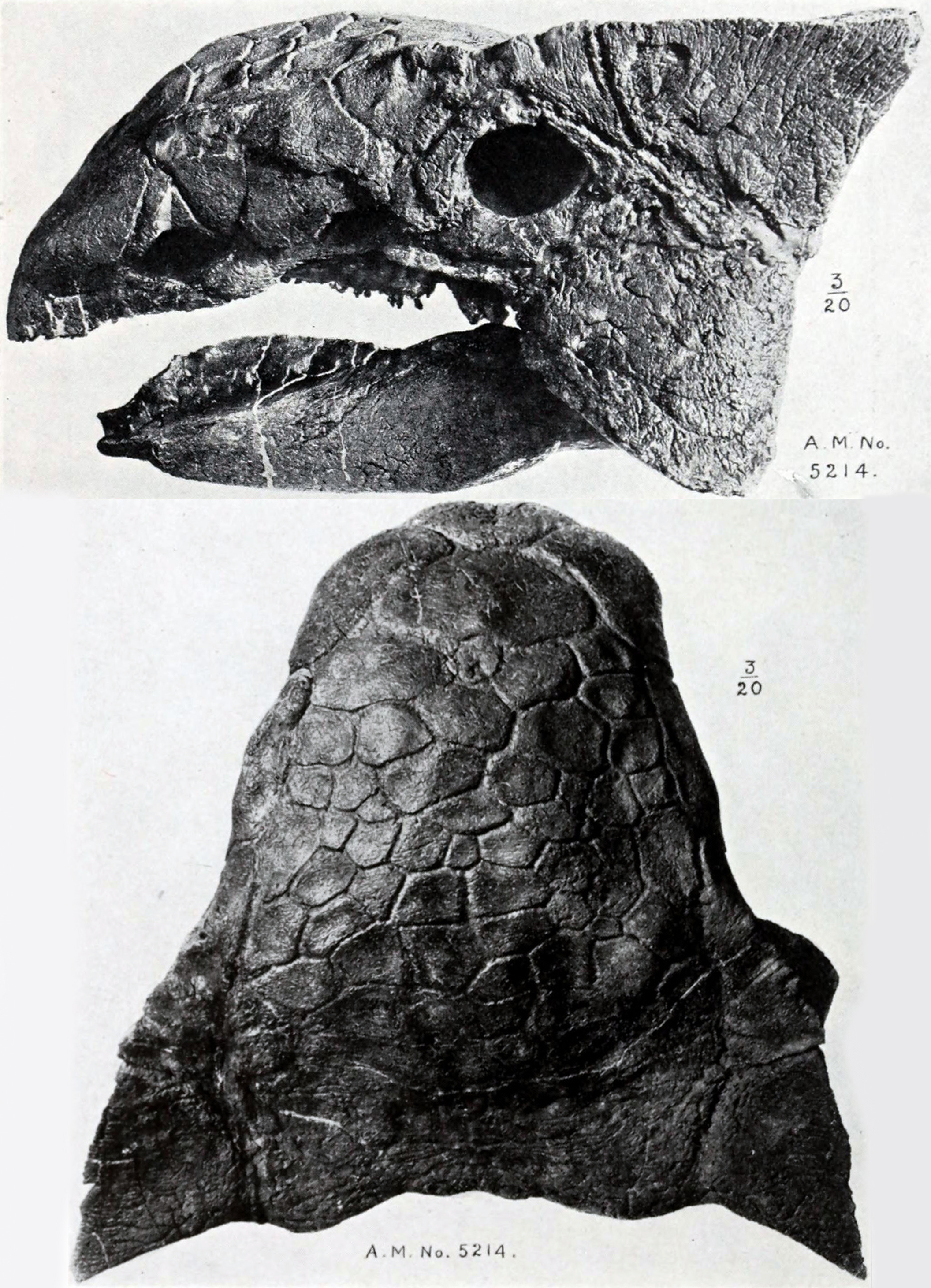
Skull (AMNH 5214) from the side and above

The three known Ankylosaurus skulls differ in various details; this is thought to be the result of taphonomy (changes happening during decay and fossilization of the remains) and individual variation. The skull was low and triangular in shape, and wider than it was long; the back of the skull was broad and low. The skull had a broad beak on the premaxillae. The orbits (eye sockets) were almost round to slightly oval and did not face directly sideways because the skull tapered towards the front. The braincase was short and robust, as in other ankylosaurines. Crests above the orbits merged into the upper squamosal horns (their shape has been described as "pyramidal"), which pointed backwards to the sides from the back of the skull. The crest and horn were probably separate elements originally, as seen in the related Pinacosaurus and Euoplocephalus. Below the upper horns, jugal horns were present, which pointed backward and down. The horns may have originally been osteoderms that fused to the skull. The scale-like cranial ornamentation on the surfaces of ankylosaurs skulls is called "caputegulae", and were the result of remodeling of the skull itself. This obliterated the sutures between skull elements, which is common for adult ankylosaurs. The caputegulum pattern of the skull was variable between specimens, though some details are shared. The caputegulae are named according to their position on the skull, and those of Ankylosaurus include a relatively large, hexagonal (or diamond-shaped) nasal caputegulum at the front of the snout between the nostrils, which had a loreal caputegulum on each side, an anterior and posterior supraorbital caputegulum above each orbit, and a ridge of nuchal caputegulae at the back of the skull.

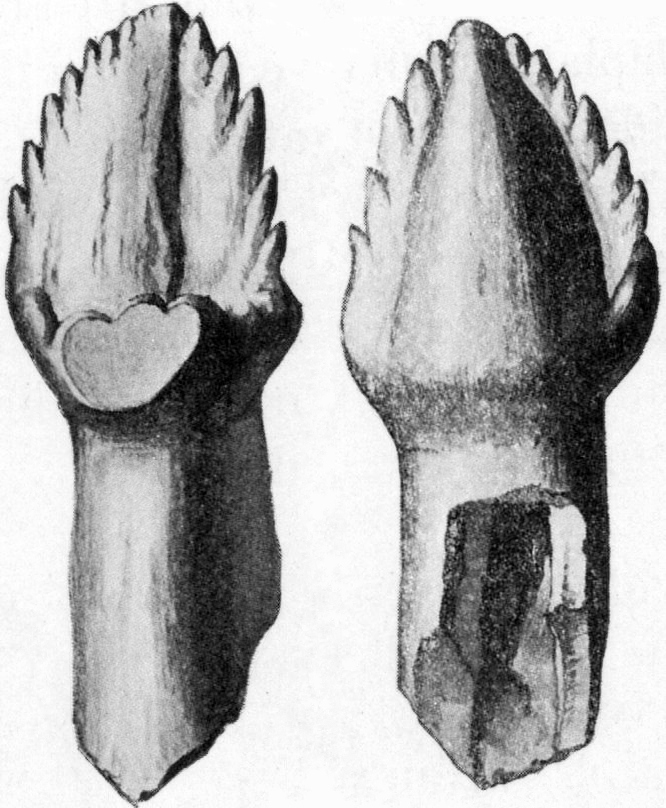
Tooth of the holotype in inner and outer view

The snout region of Ankylosaurus was unique among ankylosaurs, and had undergone an "extreme" transformation compared to its relatives. The snout was arched and truncated at the front, and the nostrils were elliptical and were directed downward and outward, unlike in all other known ankylosaurids where they faced obliquely forward or upward. Additionally, the nostrils were not visible from the front because the sinuses were expanded to the sides of the premaxilla bones, to a larger extent than seen in other ankylosaurs. Large loreal caputegulae—strap-like, side osteoderms of the snout—completely roofed the enlarged opening of the nostrils, giving a bulbous appearance. The nostrils also had an intranarial septum, which separated the nasal passage from the sinus. Each side of the snout had five sinuses, four of which expanded into the maxilla bone. The nasal cavities (or chambers) of Ankylosaurus were elongated and separated by a septum at the midline, which divided the inside of the snout into two mirrored halves. The nasal chambers had two openings, including the choanae (internal nostrils), and the air passage was looped. The maxillae expanded to the sides, giving the impression of a bulge, which may have been due to the sinuses inside. The maxillae had a ridge that may have been the attachment site for fleshy cheeks; the presence of cheeks in ornithischians is controversial, but some nodosaurs had armor plates that covered the cheek region, which may have been embedded in the flesh.

Specimen AMNH 5214 has 34–35 dental alveoli (tooth sockets) in the maxilla. The tooth rows in the maxillae of this specimen are about 20 centimeters (7.9 in) long. Each alveolus had a foramen (opening) near its side where a replacement tooth could be seen. Compared to other ankylosaurs, the mandible of Ankylosaurus was low in proportion to its length, and, when seen from the side, the tooth row was almost straight instead of arched. The mandibles are completely preserved only in the smallest specimen (AMNH 5214) and are about 41 centimeters (16 in) long. The incomplete mandible of the largest specimen (CMN 8880) is the same length. AMNH 5214 has 35 dental alveoli in the left dentary bone () and 36 in the right, for a total of 71. The predentary bone of the tip of the mandibles has not yet been found. Like other ankylosaurs, Ankylosaurus had small, phylliform (leaf-shaped) teeth, which were compressed sideways. The teeth were mostly taller than they were wide, and were very small; their size in proportion to the skull meant that the jaws of Ankylosaurus could accommodate more teeth than other ankylosaurines. The teeth of the largest Ankylosaurus skull are smaller than those of the smallest skull in the absolute sense. Some teeth from behind in the tooth row curved backwards, and tooth crowns were usually flatter on one side than the other. Ankylosaurus teeth are diagnostic and can be distinguished from the teeth of other ankylosaurids based on their smooth sides. The denticles were large, their number ranging from six to eight on the front part of the tooth, and five to seven behind.

=== Postcranial skeleton ===
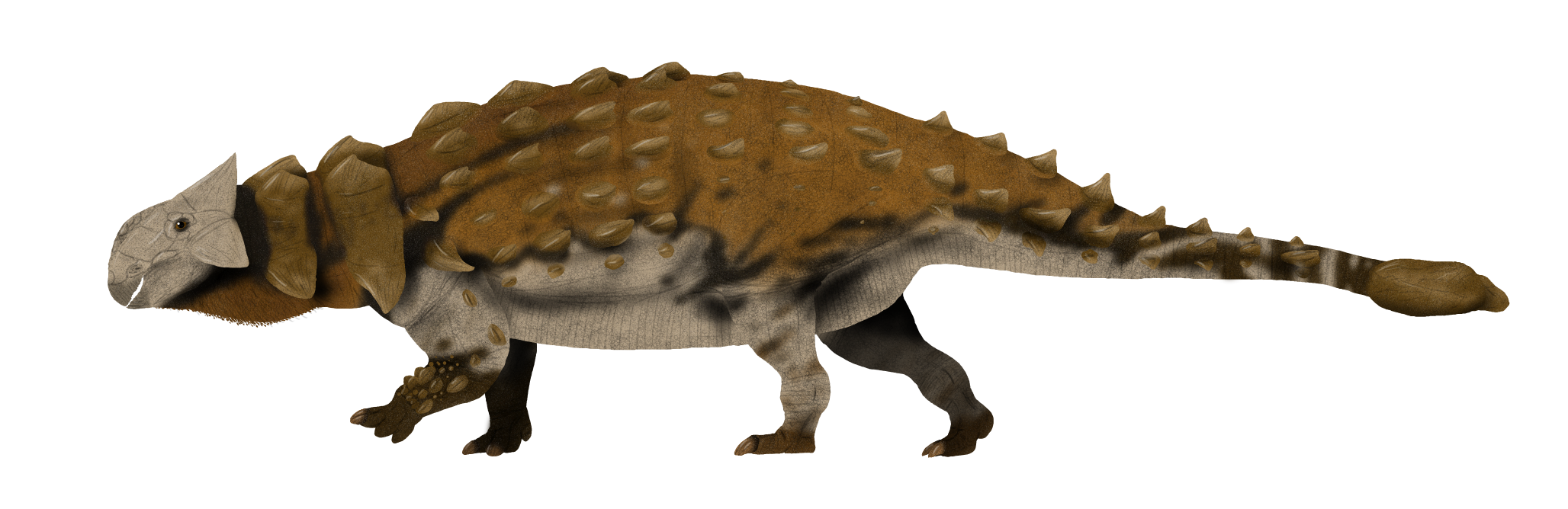
Life restoration

The structure of much of the skeleton of Ankylosaurus, including most of the pelvis, tail, and feet, is still unknown. It was quadrupedal, and its hind limbs were longer than its forelimbs. In the holotype specimen, the scapula (shoulder blade) measures 61.5 cm (2 ft 1/4 in) long and was fused with the coracoid (a rectangular bone connected to the lower end of the scapula). It also had entheses (connective tissue) for various muscle attachments. The humerus (upper arm bone) of AMNH 5214 was short, very broad and about 54 cm (1 ft 9 1/2 in) long. The femur (thigh bone), also from AMNH 5214, was 67 cm (2 ft 2 1/2 in) long and very robust. While the feet of Ankylosaurus are incompletely known, the hindfeet probably had three toes, as is the case in advanced ankylosaurids.

The cervical vertebrae had broad neural spines that increased in height towards the body. The front part of the neural spines had well-developed entheses, which was common among adult dinosaurs, and indicates the presence of large ligaments, which helped support the massive head. The dorsal vertebrae had centra (or bodies) that were short relative to their width, and their neural spines were short and narrow. The dorsal vertebrae were tightly spaced, which limited the downwards movement of the back. The neural spines had ossified (turned to bone) tendons, which also overlapped some of the vertebrae. The ribs of the last four back vertebrae were fused to the diapophyses and parapophyses (the structures that articulated the ribs with the vertebrae), and the ribcage was very broad in this part of the body. The caudal vertebrae had centra that were slightly amphicoelous, meaning they were concave on both sides.

=== Armor ===
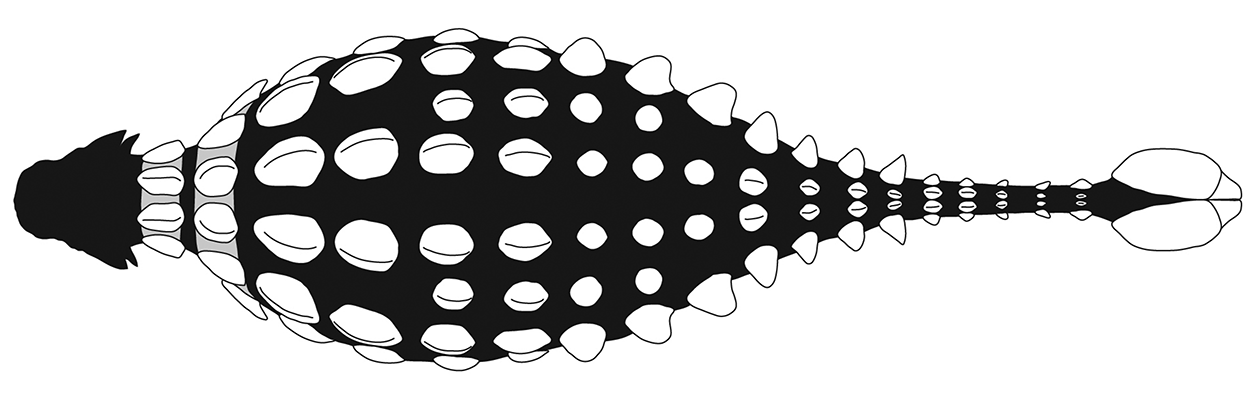
Arrangement of armor as suggested by Arbour and Mallon, 2017

A prominent feature of Ankylosaurus was its armor, consisting of knobs and plates of bone known as osteoderms, or scutes, embedded in the skin. These have not been found in articulation, so their exact placement on the body is unknown, though inferences can be made based on related animals, and various configurations have been proposed. The osteoderms ranged from 1 centimeter (1/2 in) in diameter to 35.5 cm (14 in) in length, and varied in shape. The osteoderms of Ankylosaurus were generally thin walled and hollowed on the underside. Compared to Euoplocephalus, the osteoderms of Ankylosaurus were smoother. Many smaller osteoderms and ossicles probably occupied the space between the larger ones, as in other ankylosaurids. The osteoderms covering the body were very flat, though with a low keel at one margin. In contrast, the nodosaurid Edmontonia had high keels stretching from one margin to the other on the midline of its osteoderms. Ankylosaurus had some smaller osteoderms with a keel across the midline.

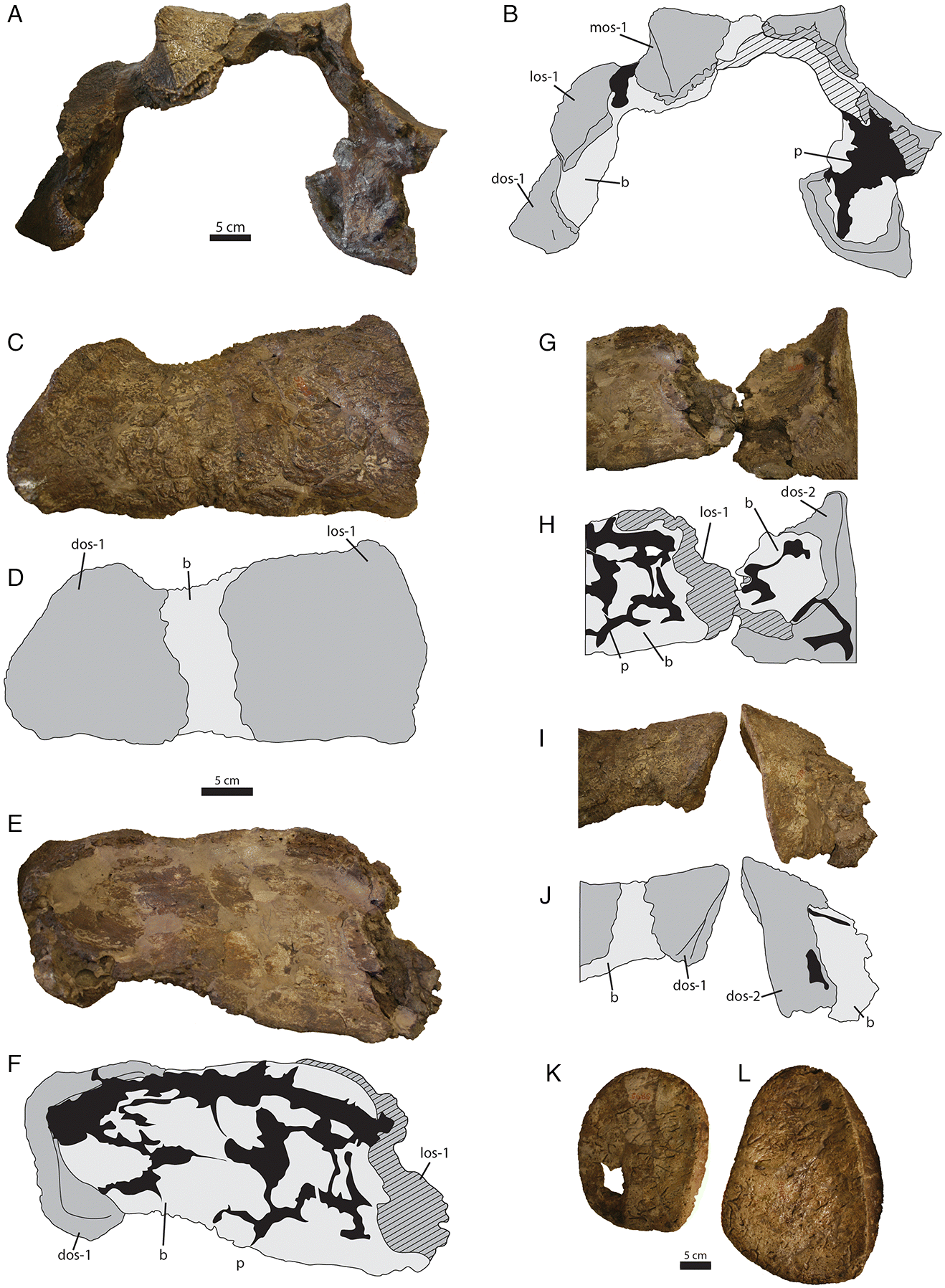
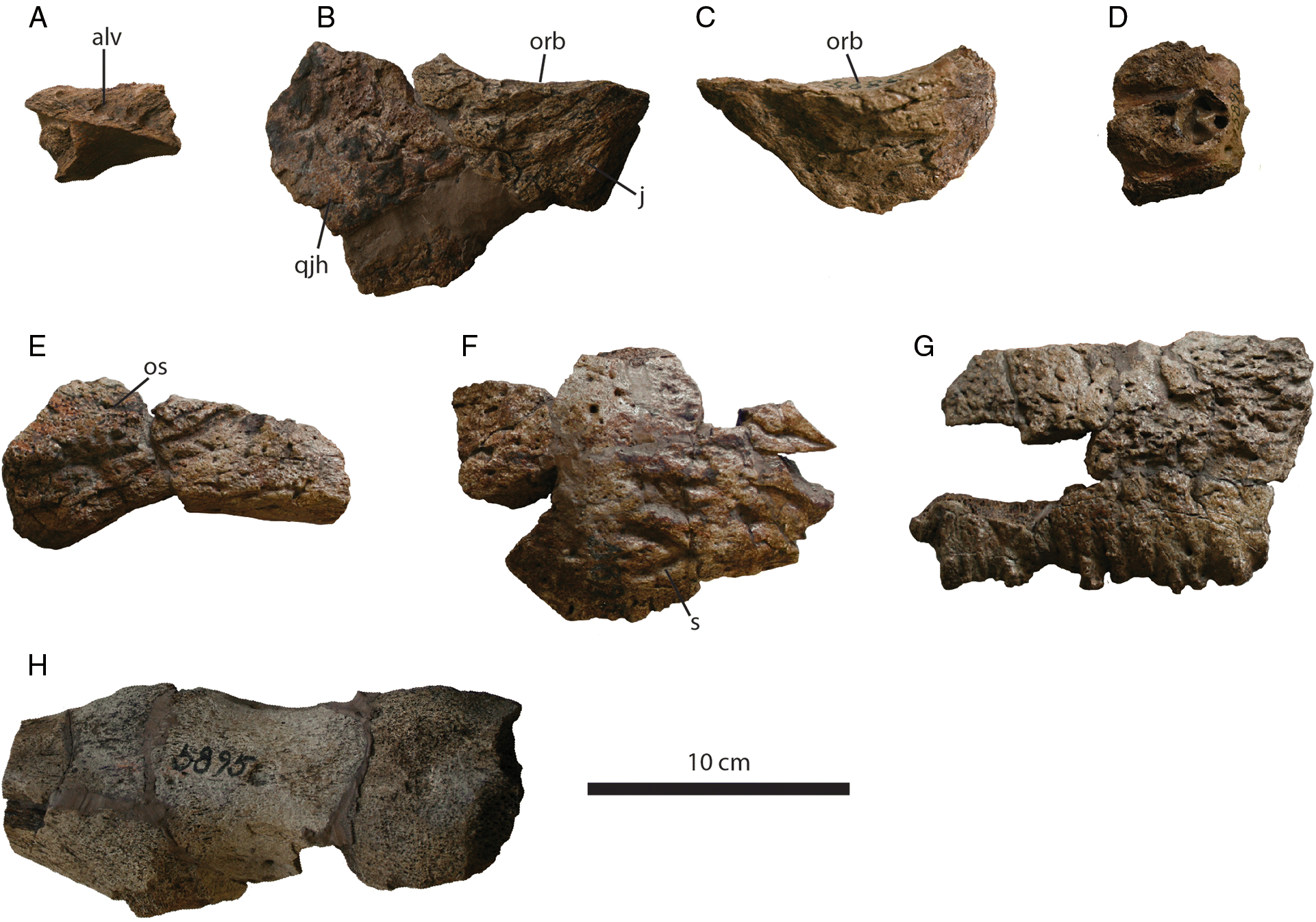
Left: Cervical half ring from the neck of Euoplocephalus (A–B) compared with half-ring fragments (C–J) of Ankylosaurus (holotype), and possible back osteoderms (K–L). Right: elements of the holotype that were identified in 2017, including parts of the skull (A–D) and cervical half rings (E–H)

Like other ankylosaurids, Ankylosaurus had cervical half-rings (armor plates on the neck), but these are known only from fragments, making their exact arrangement uncertain. Carpenter suggested that when seen from above, the plates would have been paired, creating an inverted V-shape across the neck, with the midline gap probably being filled with small ossicles (round bony scutes) to allow for movement. He believed the width of this armor belt was too wide to have fitted solely on the neck, and that it covered the base of the neck and continued onto the shoulder region. Arbour and the Canadian paleontologist Philip J. Currie disagreed with Carpenter's interpretation in 2015 and pointed out that the cervical half-ring fragments of the holotype specimen did not fit together in the way proposed by Carpenter (though this could be due to breakage). They instead suggested that the fragments represented the remains of two cervical half-rings, which formed two semi-circular plates of armor around the upper part of the neck, as in the closely related Anodontosaurus and Euoplocephalus. Arbour and Mallon elaborated on this idea, describing the shape of these half-rings as "continuous U-shaped yokes" over the upper part of the neck, and suggested that Ankylosaurus had six keeled osteoderms with oval bases on each half-ring.

The first osteoderms behind the second cervical half-ring would have been similar in shape to those in the first half-ring, and the osteoderms on the back probably decreased in diameter hindwards. The largest osteoderms were probably arranged in transverse and longitudinal rows across most of the body, with four or five transverse rows separated by creases in the skin. The osteoderms on the flanks would probably have had a more square outline than those on the back. There may have been four longitudinal rows of osteoderms on the flanks. Unlike some basal ankylosaurs and many nodosaurs, ankylosaurids do not appear to have had co-ossified pelvic shields above their hips. Some osteoderms without keels may have been placed above the hip region of Ankylosaurus, as in Euoplocephalus. Ankylosaurus may have had three or four transverse rows of circular osteoderms over the pelvic region, which were smaller than those on the rest of the body, as in Scolosaurus. Smaller, triangular osteoderms may have been present on the sides of the pelvis. Flattened, pointed plates resemble those on the sides of the tail of Saichania, and may have been distributed similarly on Ankylosaurus. Osteoderms with oval keels could have been placed on the upper side of the tail or the side of the limbs. Compressed, triangular osteoderms found with Ankylosaurus specimens may have been placed on the sides of the pelvis or the tail. Ovoid, keeled, and teardrop-shaped osteoderms are known from Ankylosaurus, and may have been placed on the forelimbs, like those known from Pinacosaurus, but it is unknown whether the hindlimbs bore osteoderms.

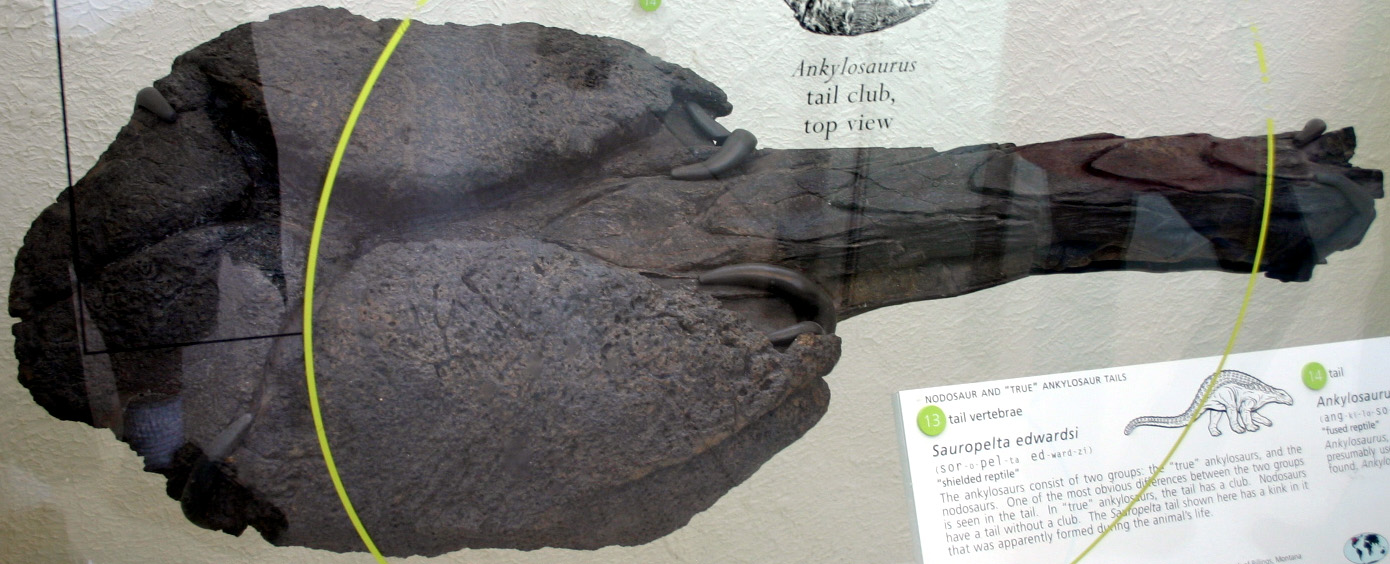
Only known Ankylosaurus tail club (AMNH 5214), at American Museum of Natural History

The tail club (or tail knob) of Ankylosaurus was composed of two large osteoderms, with a row of small osteoderms at the midline, and two small osteoderms at the tip; these osteoderms obscured the last tail vertebra. As only the tail club of specimen AMNH 5214 is known, the range of variation between individuals is unknown. The tail club of AMNH 5214 is 60 cm (23 1/2 in) long, 49 cm (19 1/2 in) wide, and 19 cm (7 1/2 in) tall. The club of the largest specimen may have been 57 cm (22 1/2 in) wide. The tail club of Ankylosaurus was semicircular when seen from above, similar to those of Euoplocephalus and Scolosaurus but unlike the pointed club osteoderms of Anodontosaurus or the narrow, elongated club of Dyoplosaurus. The last seven tail vertebrae formed the "handle" of the tail club. These vertebrae were in contact, with no cartilage between them, and were sometimes co-ossified, which made them immobile. Ossified tendons attached to the vertebrae in front of the tail club, and these features together helped strengthen it. The interlocked zygapophyses (articular processes) and neural spines of the handle vertebrae were U-shaped when seen from above, whereas those of most other ankylosaurids are V-shaped, which may be due to the handle of Ankylosaurus being wider. The larger width may indicate that the tail of Ankylosaurus was shorter in relation to its body length than those of other ankylosaurids, or that it had the same proportions but with a smaller club.

== Classification ==
Brown considered Ankylosaurus so distinct that he made it the type genus of a new family, Ankylosauridae, typified by massive, triangular skulls, short necks, stiff backs, broad bodies, and osteoderms. He also classified Palaeoscincus (only known from teeth), and Euoplocephalus (then only known from a partial skull and osteoderms) as part of the family. Due to the fragmentary condition of the remains, Brown was unable to fully distinguish between Euoplocephalus and Ankylosaurus. Having for comparison only a few, incomplete members of the family, he believed the group was part of the suborder Stegosauria. In 1923 Osborn coined the name Ankylosauria, thereby placing the ankylosaurids in their own suborder.

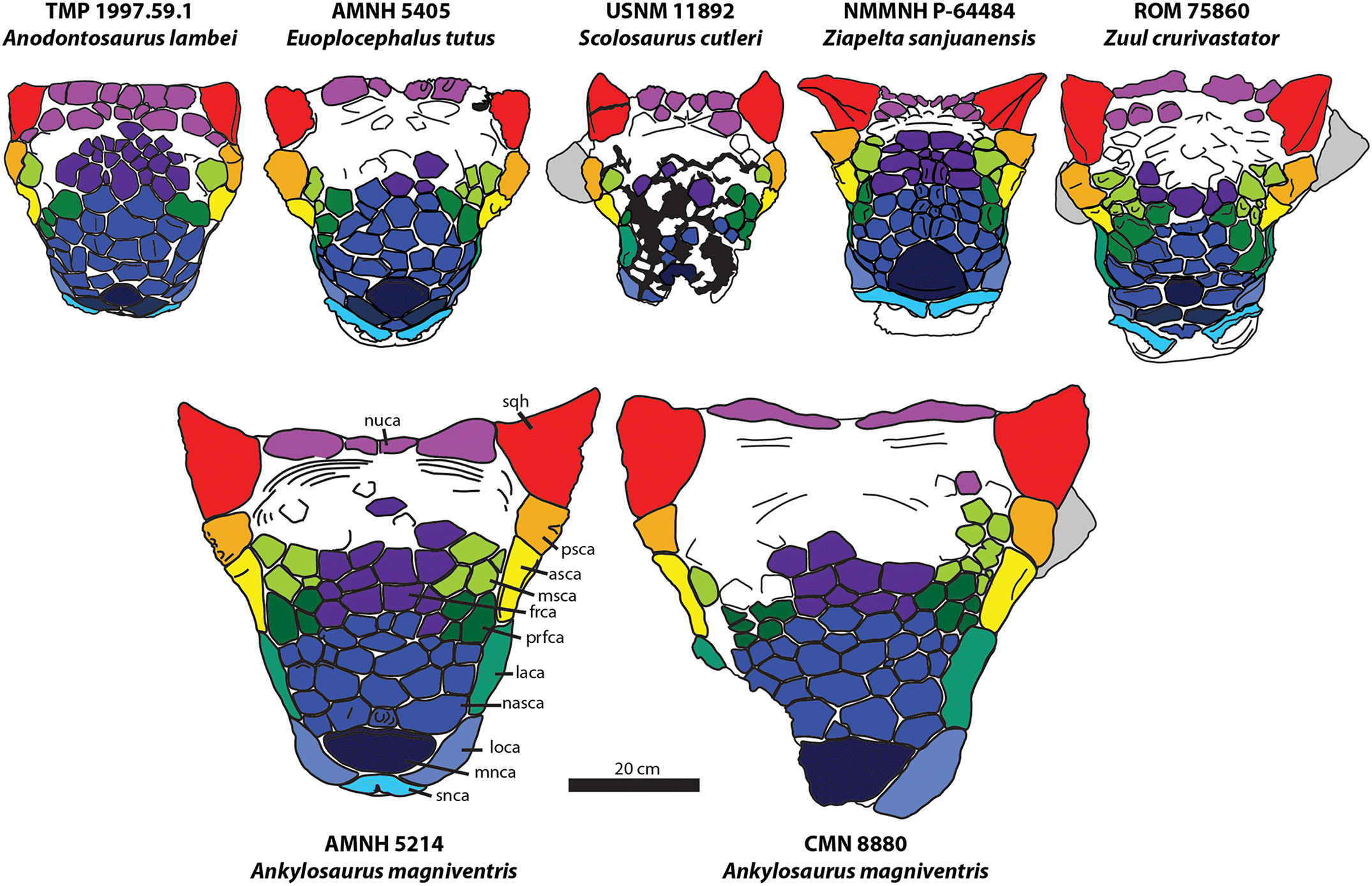
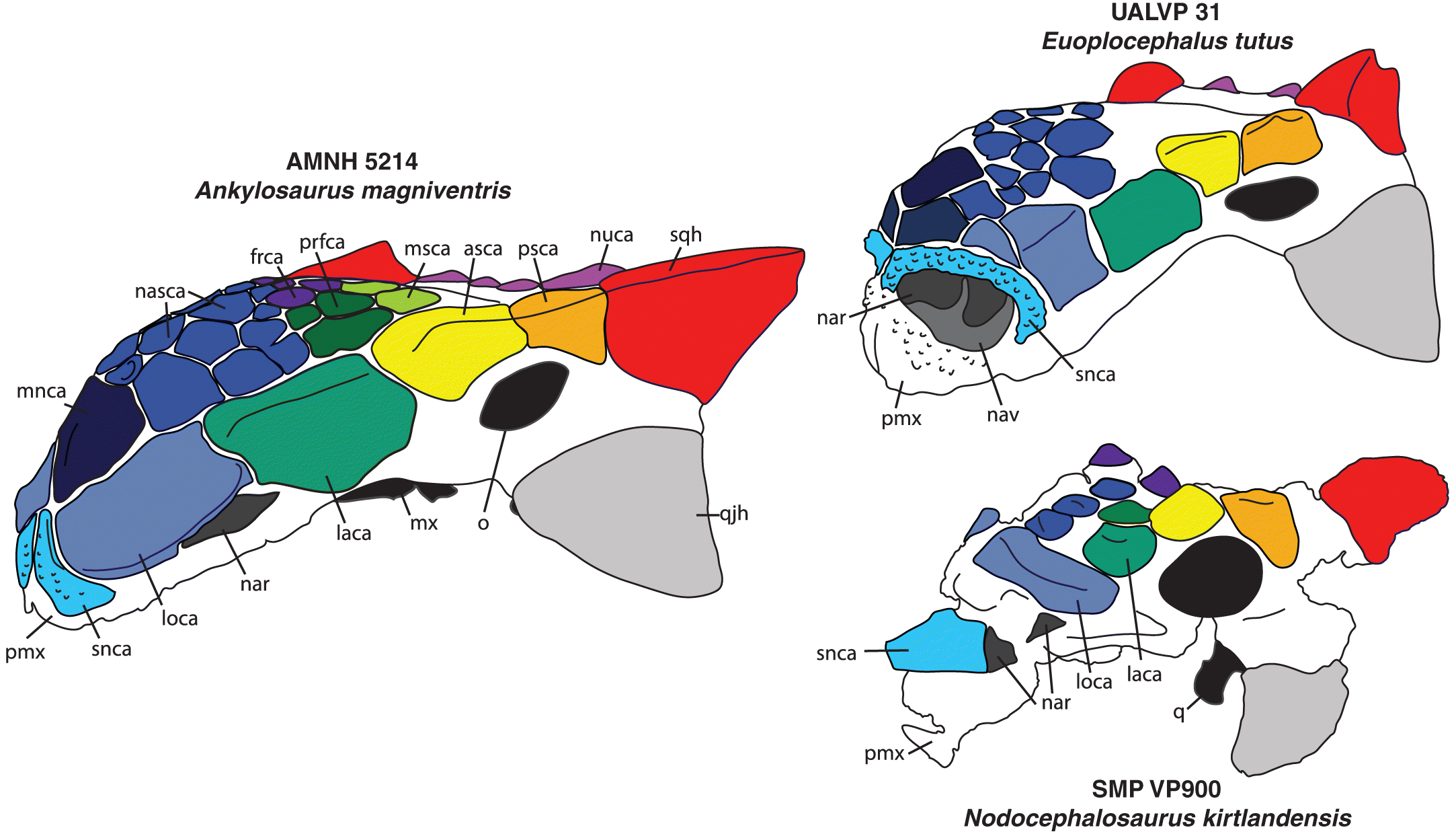
Skulls of the ankylosaurins with color coded caputegulae (cranial ornamentation)
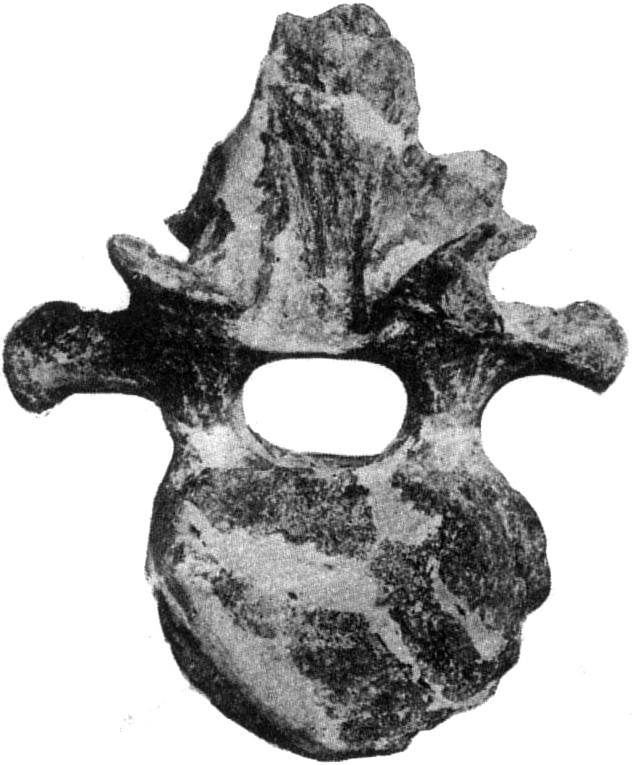
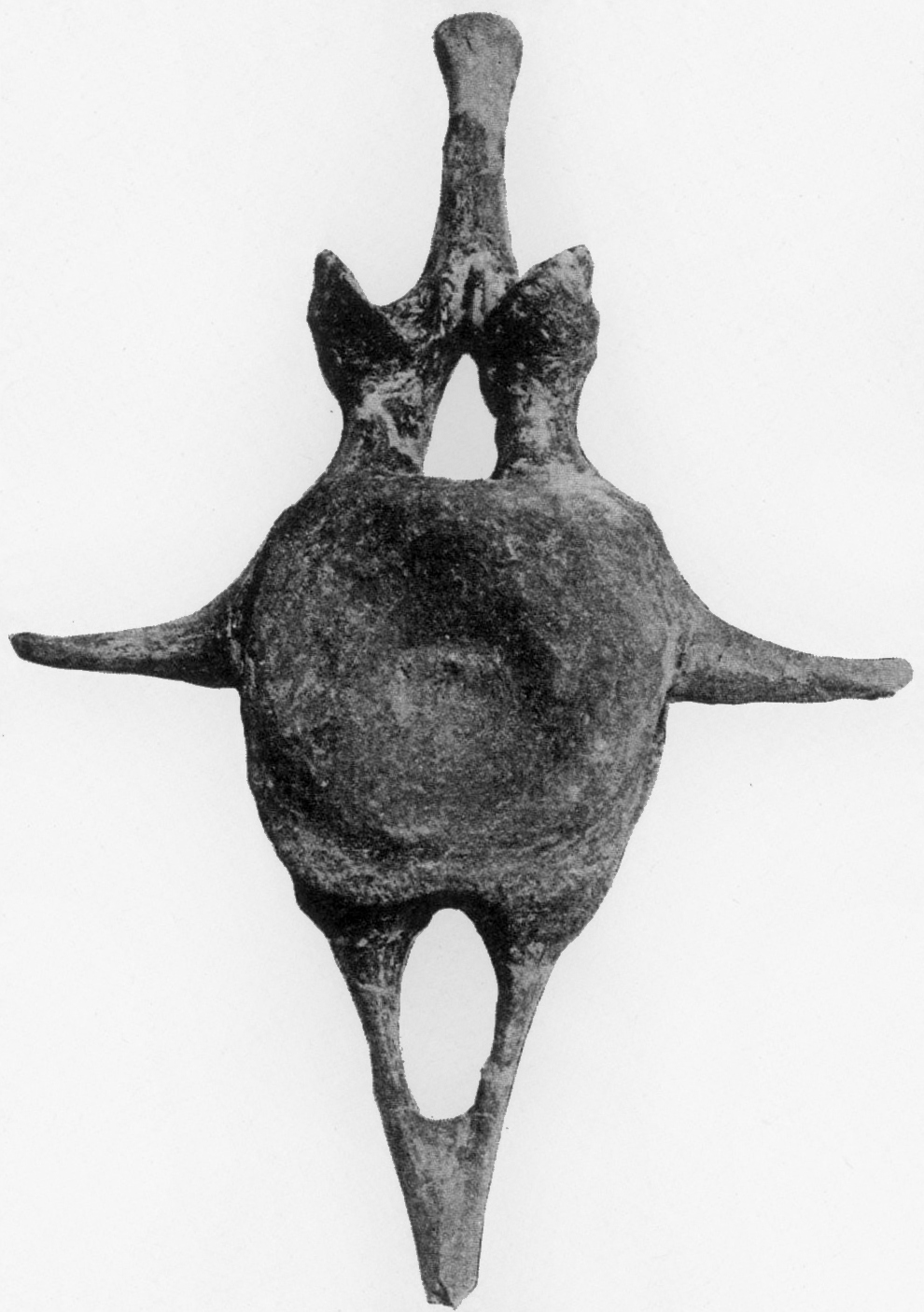
Cervical vertebra from the neck (left) and caudal vertebra from the tail (right) of the holotype

Ankylosauria and Stegosauria are now grouped together within the clade Thyreophora. This group first appeared in the Sinemurian age, and survived for 135 million years until disappearing in the Maastrichtian. They were widespread and inhabited a broad range of environments. As more complete specimens and new genera have been discovered, theories about ankylosaurian interrelatedness have become more complex, and hypotheses have often changed between studies. In addition to Ankylosauridae, Ankylosauria has been divided into the families Nodosauridae, and sometimes Polacanthidae (these families lacked tail clubs). Ankylosaurus is considered part of the subfamily Ankylosaurinae (members of which are called ankylosaurines) within Ankylosauridae. Ankylosaurus appears to be most closely related to Anodontosaurus and Euoplocephalus. The following cladogram is based on a 2015 phylogenetic analysis of the Ankylosaurinae conducted by Arbour and Currie:

- Ankylosaurinae
  - Crichtonpelta
  - - Tsagantegia
    - Zhejiangosaurus
    - Pinacosaurus
    - - - Saichania
        - - Tarchia
          - Zaraapelta
      - Ankylosaurini
        - Dyoplosaurus
        - - - Talarurus
            - Nodocephalosaurus
          - - - Ankylosaurus
              - Anodontosaurus
            - Euoplocephalus
            - - Scolosaurus
              - Ziapelta

Because Ankylosaurus and other Late Cretaceous North American ankylosaurids were grouped with Asian genera (in a tribe the authors named Ankylosaurini), Arbour and Currie suggested that earlier North American ankylosaurids had gone extinct by the late Albian or Cenomanian ages of the Middle Cretaceous. Ankylosaurids thereafter recolonized North America from Asia during the Campanian or Turonian ages of the Late Cretaceous, and there diversified again, leading to genera such as Ankylosaurus, Anodontosaurus, and Euoplocephalus. The theory explains a 30-million-year gap in the fossil record of North American ankylosaurids between the ages.

== Paleobiology ==
=== Feeding ===
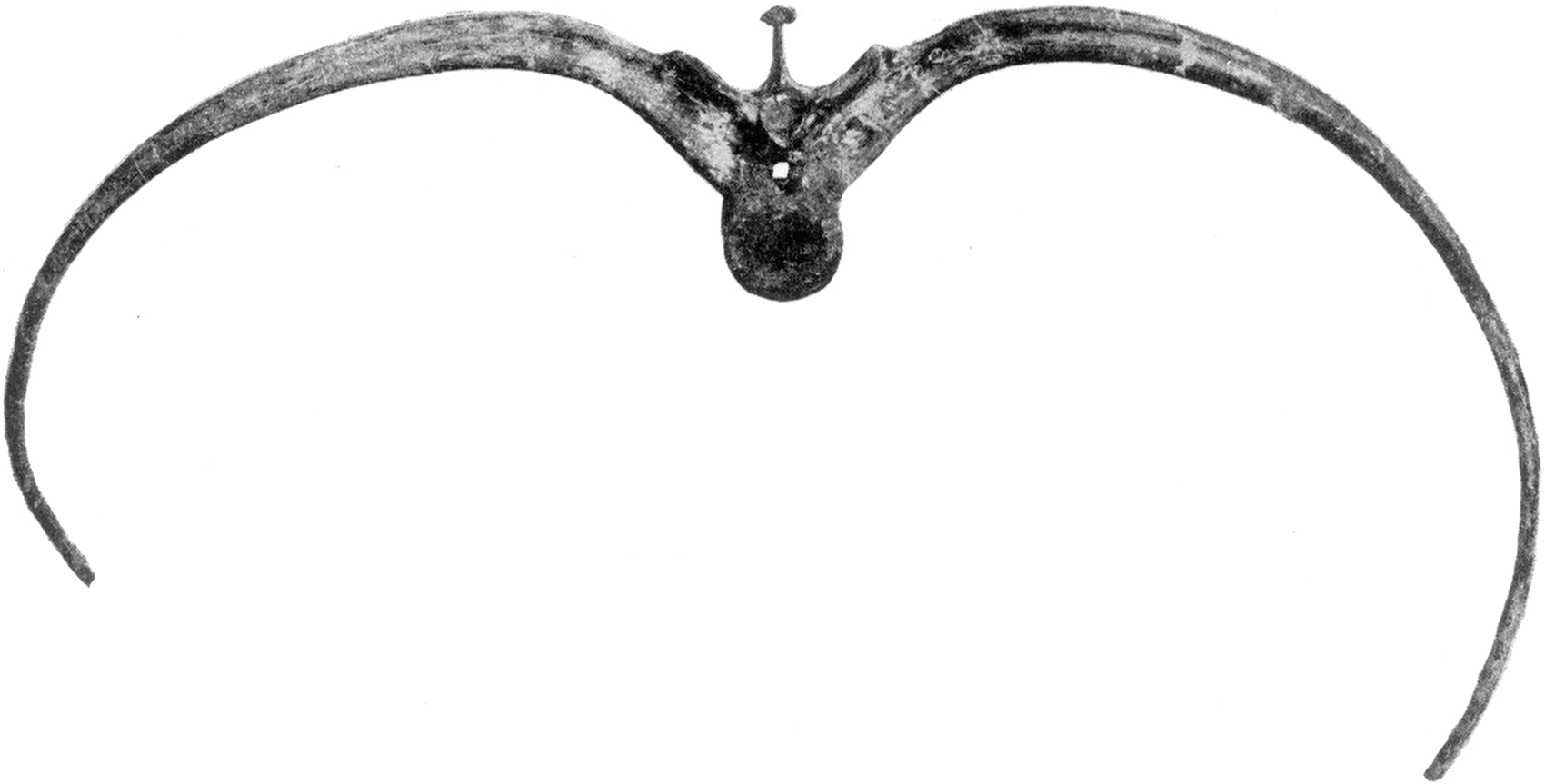
Back vertebra with fused ribs of the holotype. The broad body housed a large digestion system.

Like other ornithischians, Ankylosaurus was herbivorous. Its wide muzzle was adapted for non-selective low-browse cropping, although not to the extent seen in some related genera, especially Euoplocephalus. Though ankylosaurs may not have fed on fibrous and woody plants, they may have had a varied diet, including tough leaves and pulpy fruits. Ankylosaurus probably fed on abundant ferns and low-growing shrubs. Assuming it was endothermic, Ankylosaurus would have eaten 60 kilograms (130 pounds) of ferns per day, similar to the amount of dry vegetation a large elephant would consume. The requirements for nutrition could have been more effectively met if Ankylosaurus ate fruit, which its small, cusp-like teeth and the shape of its beak seem well adapted for, compared to for example Euoplocephalus. Certain invertebrates, which the small teeth may have been adapted for handling, could also have provided supplemental nutrition.

Fossils of Ankylosaurus teeth exhibit wear on the face of the crown rather than on the tip of the crown, as in nodosaurid ankylosaurs. In 1982 Carpenter ascribed to baby Ankylosaurus two very small teeth that originate from the Lance and Hell Creek Formations and measure 3.2 to 3.3 mm (1/8 to 17/128 in) in length, respectively. The smaller tooth is heavily worn, leading Carpenter to suggest that ankylosaurids in general or at least the young did not swallow their food whole but employed some sort of chewing. Since adult Ankylosaurus did little chewing of its food, it would have spent less time in the day foraging than an elephant. Based on the broadness of the ribcage, the digestion of unchewed food may have been facilitated by hindgut fermentation like in modern herbivorous lizards, which have several chambers in their enlarged colon.

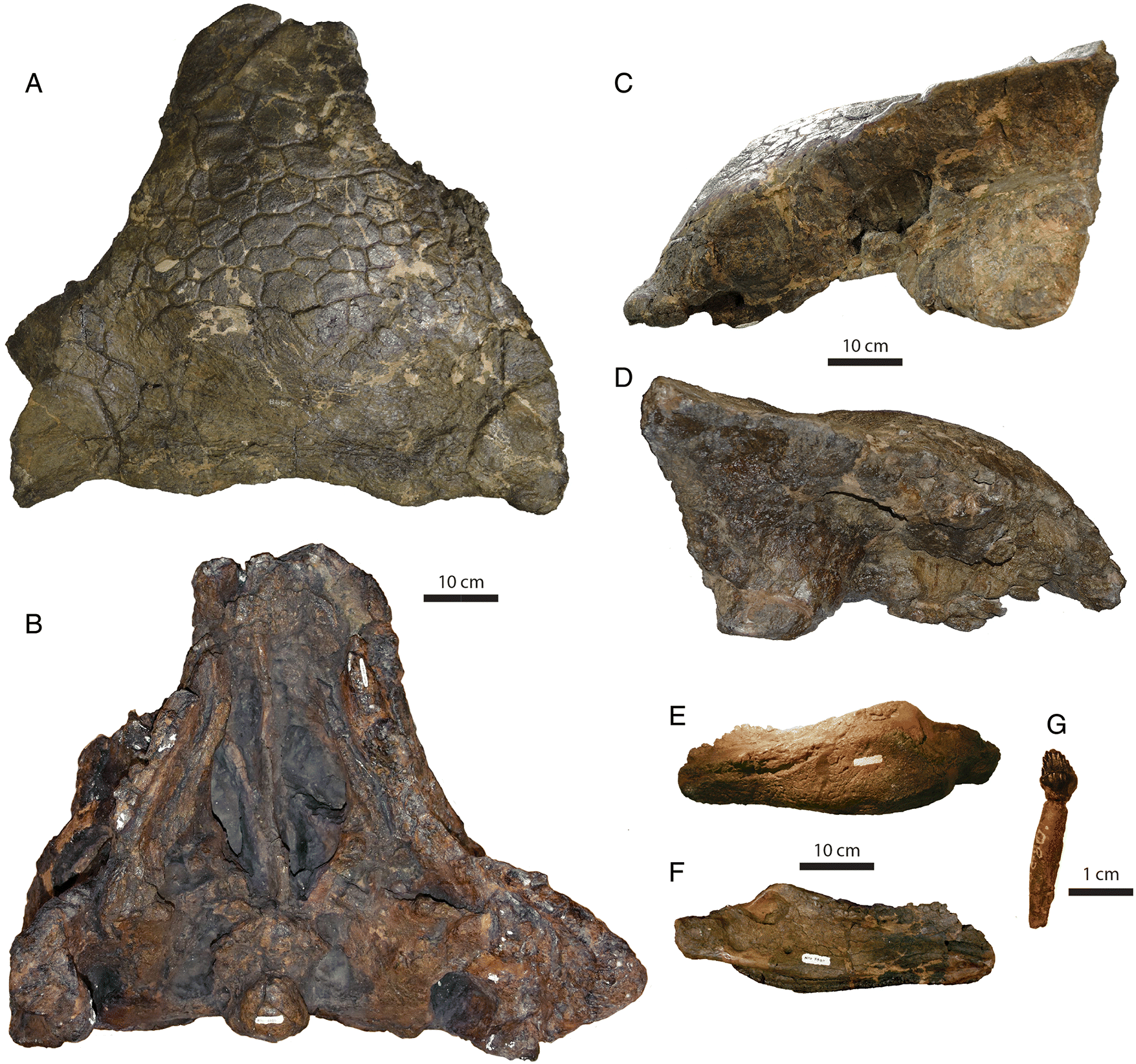
Skull of specimen CMN 8880, the largest-known ankylosaurid, including lower jaw (E–F) and tooth (G)

In 1969, paleontologist Georg Haas concluded that despite the large size of ankylosaur skulls, the associated musculature was relatively weak. He also thought jaw movement was limited to up and down movements. Extrapolating from this, Haas suggested that ankylosaurs ate relatively soft non-abrasive vegetation. Later research on Euoplocephalus indicates that forward and sideways jaw movement was possible in these animals, the skull being able to withstand considerable forces. A 2016 study of the dental occlusion (contact between the teeth) of ankylosaur specimens found that the ability for backwards (palinal) jaw movement evolved independently in different ankylosaur lineages, including Late Cretaceous North American ankylosaurids like Ankylosaurus and Euoplocephalus.

The retracted position of the nostrils of Ankylosaurus were compared to those of fossorial (digging) worm lizards and blind snakes by Arbour and Mallon in 2017, and though it was probably not a burrowing animal, the snout of Ankylosaurus may indicate earth-moving behavior. These factors, as well as the low rate of tooth formation in ankylosaurs compared to other ornithischians, indicate that Ankylosaurus may have been omnivorous (eating both plant and animal matter). It may also (or alternatively) have dug in the ground for roots and tubers. A 2023 study by paleontologist Antonio Ballell and colleagues found that North American ankylosaurids from the latest Cretaceous (including Ankylosaurus) had jaws with low mechanical advantage, whereas those of earlier relatives were high to moderate. These late ankylosaurids also had tooth occlusion and complex biphasal jaw mechanisms, features shared with some Late Cretaceous nodosaurids, but those instead have jaws with high mechanical advantage. This indicates that while the two groups converged in some features, the nodosaurs had higher relative bite force, which suggests diverging jaw mechanics and dietary partitioning between the two.

=== Airspaces and senses ===
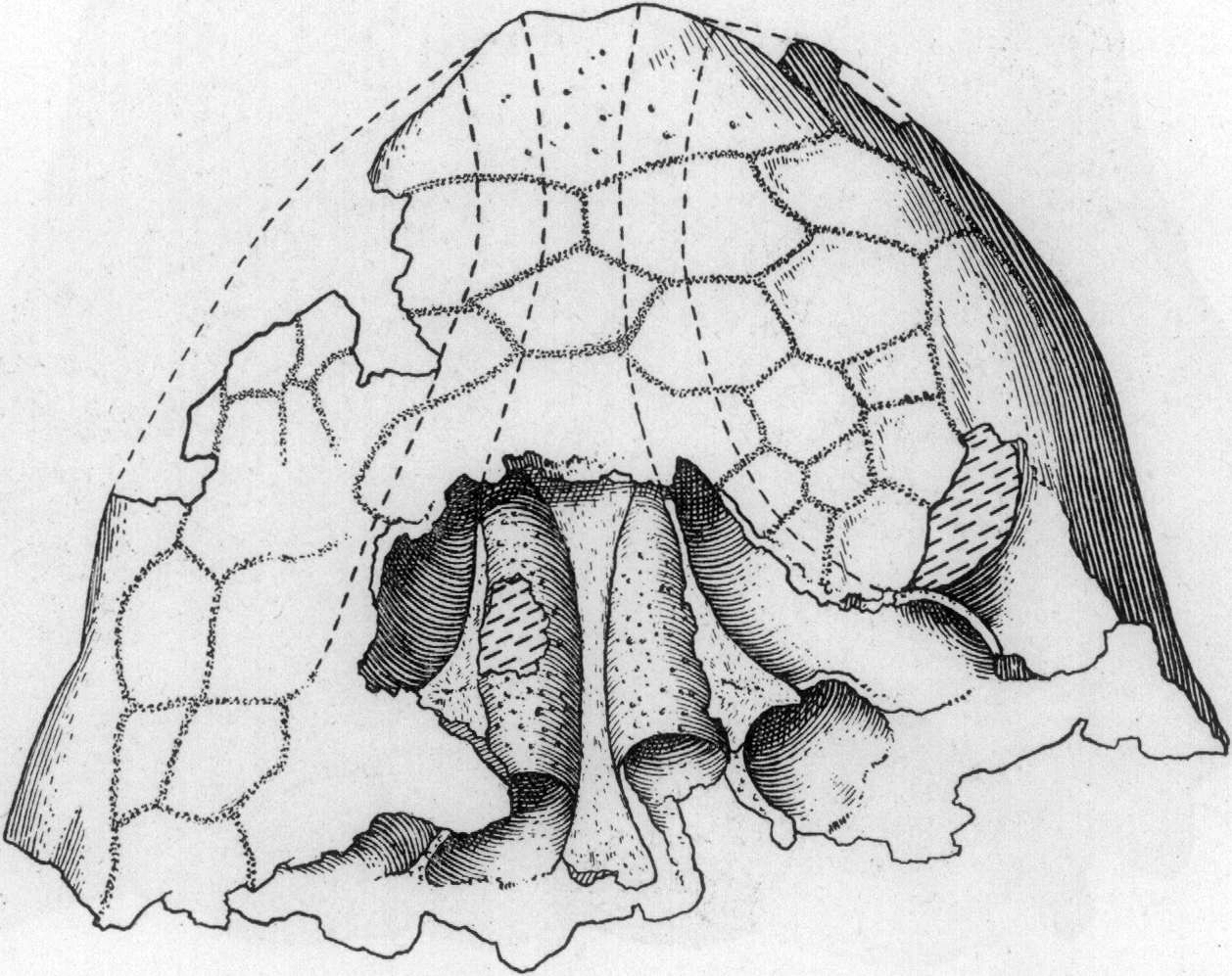
Diagram showing nasal chambers inside the snout (holotype)

In 1977, paleontologist Teresa Maryańska proposed that the complex sinuses and nasal cavities of ankylosaurs may have lightened the weight of the skull, housed a nasal gland, or acted as a chamber for vocal resonance. Carpenter rejected these hypotheses, arguing that tetrapod animals make sounds through the larynx, not the nostrils, and that reduction in weight was minimal, as the spaces only accounted for a small percent of the skull volume. He also considered a gland unlikely and noted that the sinuses may not have had any specific function. It has also been suggested that the respiratory passages were used to perform a mammal-like treatment of inhaled air, based on the presence and arrangement of specialized bones.

A 2011 study of the nasal passages of Euoplocephalus by paleontologist Tetsuto Miyashita and colleagues supported their function as a heat and water balancing system, noting the extensive blood vessel system and an increased surface area for the mucosa membrane (used for heat and water exchange in modern animals). The researchers also supported the idea of the loops acting as a resonance chamber, comparable to the elongated nasal passages of saiga antelope and the looping trachea of cranes and swans. Reconstructions of the inner ear suggest adaptation to hearing at low frequencies, such as the low-toned resonant sounds possibly produced by the nasal passages. They disputed the possibility that the looping is related to olfaction (sense of smell) as the olfactory region is pushed to the sides of the main airway.

According to Carpenter, the shape of the nasal chambers of Ankylosaurus indicate that airflow was unidirectional (looping through the lungs during inhalation and exhalation), although it may also have been bidirectional in the posterior nasal chamber, with air directed past the olfactory lobes. The enlarged olfactory region of ankylosaurids indicates a well-developed sense of smell. Though hindwards retraction of the nostrils is seen in aquatic animals and animals with a proboscis, it is unlikely either possibility applies to Ankylosaurus, as the nostrils tend to be reduced or the premaxilla extended. In addition, though the widely separated nostrils may have allowed for stereo-olfaction (where each nostril senses smells from different directions), as has been proposed for the moose, little is known about this feature. The position of the orbits of Ankylosaurus suggest some stereoscopic vision.

=== Limb movements ===
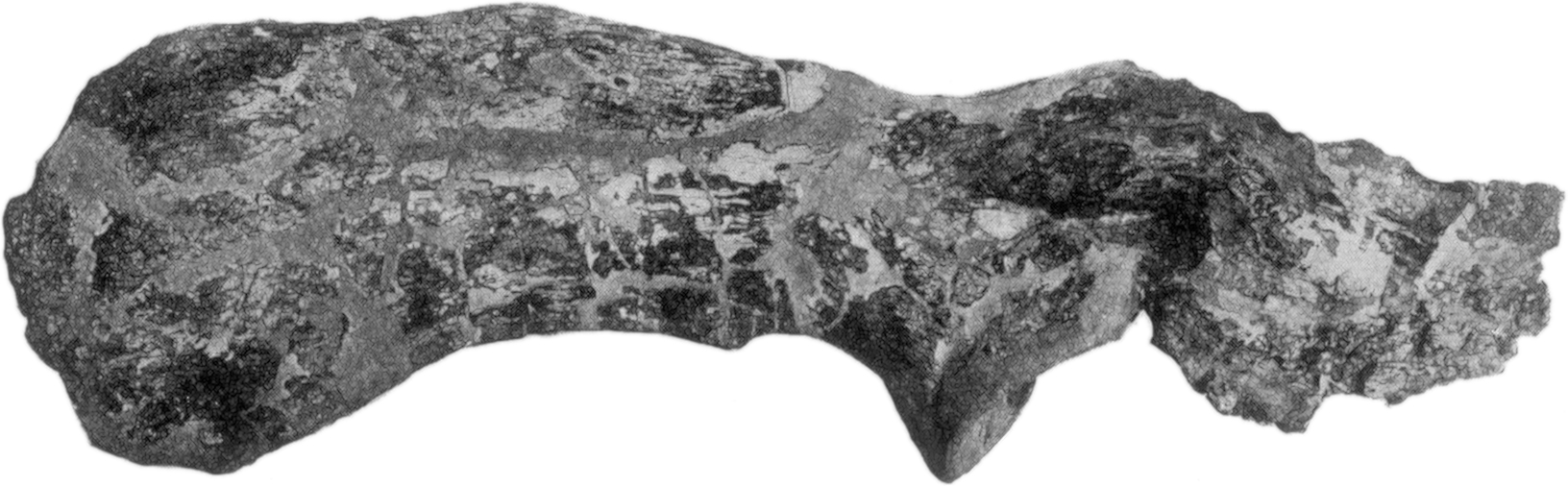
Shoulder blade and coracoid of the holotype

Reconstructions of ankylosaur forelimb musculature made by Coombs in 1978 suggest that the forelimbs bore the majority of the animal's weight, and were adapted for high force delivery on the front feet, possibly for food gathering. In addition, Coombs suggested that ankylosaurs may have been capable diggers, though the hoof-like structure of the manus would have limited fossorial activity. Ankylosaurs were likely to have been slow-moving and sluggish animals, though they may have been capable of quick movements when necessary.

=== Growth ===
The squamosal horns of the largest Ankylosaurus specimen are blunter than those of the smallest specimen, which is also the case in Euoplocephalus, and this may represent ontogenetic variation (related to growth development). Studies of specimens of Pinacosaurus of different ages found that during ontogenetic development, the ribs of juvenile ankylosaurs fused with their vertebrae. The forelimbs strongly increased in robustness while the hindlimbs did not become larger relative to the rest of the skeleton, further evidence that the arms bore most of the weight. In the cervical half-rings, the underlying bone band developed outgrowths connecting it with the underlying osteoderms, which simultaneously fused to each other. On the skull, the middle bone plates first ossified at the snout and the rear rim, with ossification gradually extending towards the middle regions. On the rest of the body, ossification progressed from the neck backward in the direction of the tail.

=== Defense ===
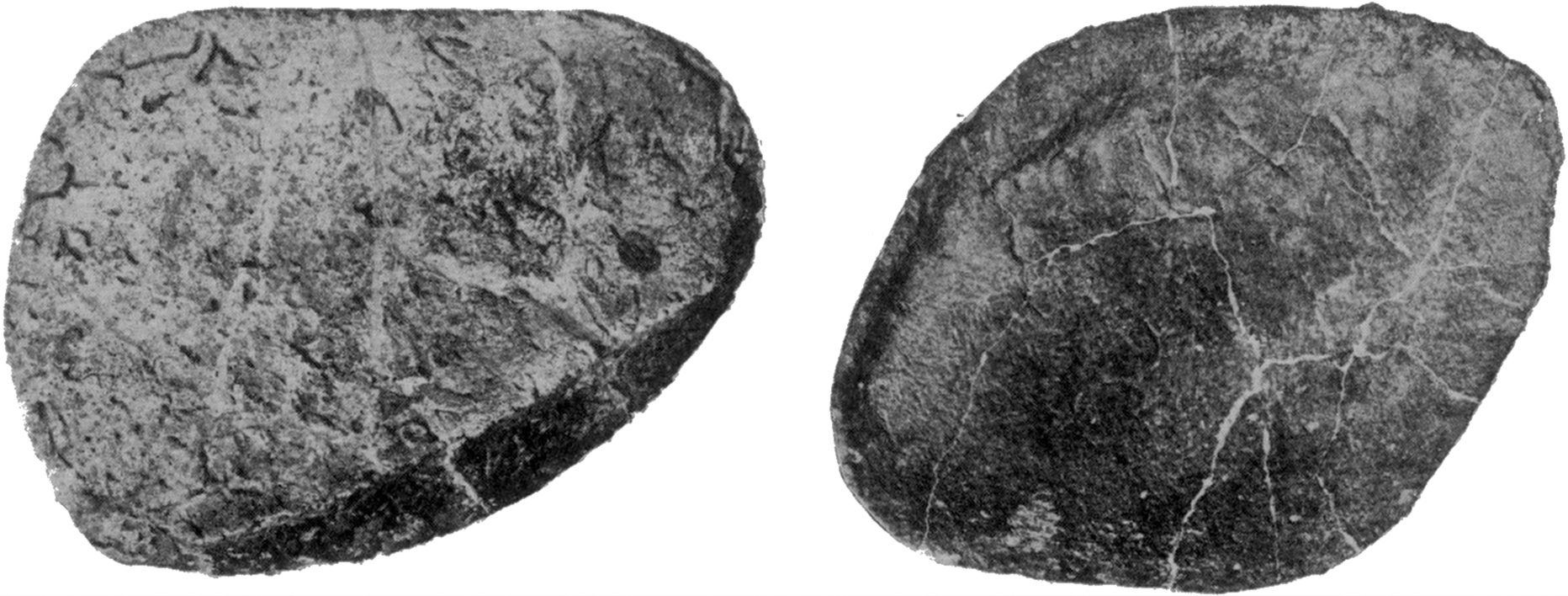
Possible back osteoderm (holotype), in outer and inner view

The osteoderms of ankylosaurids were thin in comparison to those of other ankylosaurs, and appear to have been strengthened by randomly distributed cushions of collagen fibers. Structurally similar to Sharpey's fibres, they were embedded directly into the bone tissue, a feature unique to ankylosaurids. This would have provided the ankylosaurids with an armor covering that was both lightweight and highly durable, being resistant to breakage and penetration by the teeth of predators. The palpebral bones over the eyes may have provided additional protection for them. Carpenter suggested in 1982 that the heavily vascularized armor may also have had a role in thermoregulation as in modern crocodilians.

The tail club of Ankylosaurus seems to have been an active defensive weapon, capable of producing enough of an impact to break the bones of an assailant. The tendons of the tail were partially ossified and were not very elastic, allowing great force to be transmitted to the club when it was used as a weapon. Coombs suggested in 1979 that several hindlimb muscles would have controlled the swinging of the tail, and that violent thrusts of the club would have been able to break the metatarsal bones of large theropods.

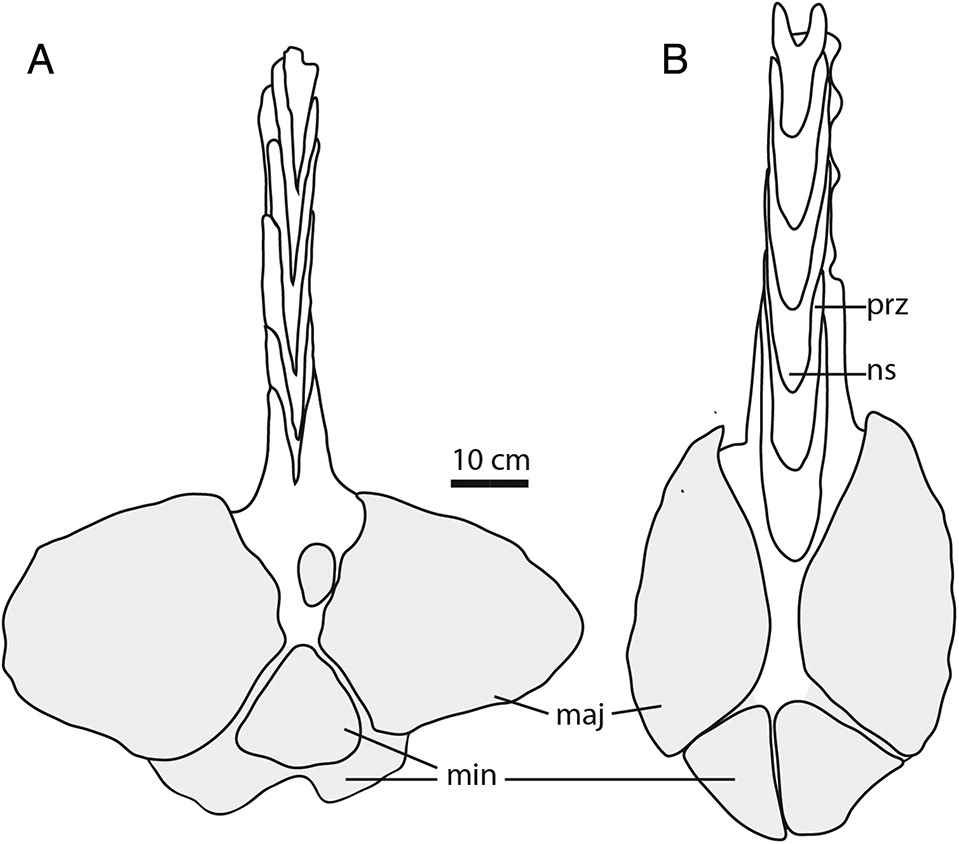
Comparison between the tail clubs of Anodontosaurus and Ankylosaurus

A 2009 study estimated that ankylosaurids could swing their tails at 100 degrees laterally, and the mainly cancellous clubs would have had a lowered moment of inertia and been effective weapons. The study also found that while adult ankylosaurid tail clubs were capable of breaking bones, those of juveniles were not. Despite the feasibility of tail-swinging, the researchers could not determine whether ankylosaurids used their clubs for defense against potential predators, in intraspecific combat, or both. Other studies have found evidence of ankylosaurids using their tail clubs for intraspecific combat. One specimen of Tarchia showed signs of injury on both the pelvic and tail area and the club was found to be asymmetrical, a sign of being worn down by the strikes.

In 1993, Tony Thulborn proposed that the tail club of ankylosaurids primarily acted as a decoy for the head, as he thought the tail too short and inflexible to have an effective reach; the "dummy head" would lure a predator close to the tail, where it could be struck. Carpenter has rejected this idea, as tail club shape is highly variable among ankylosaurids, even in the same genus.

== Paleoenvironment ==
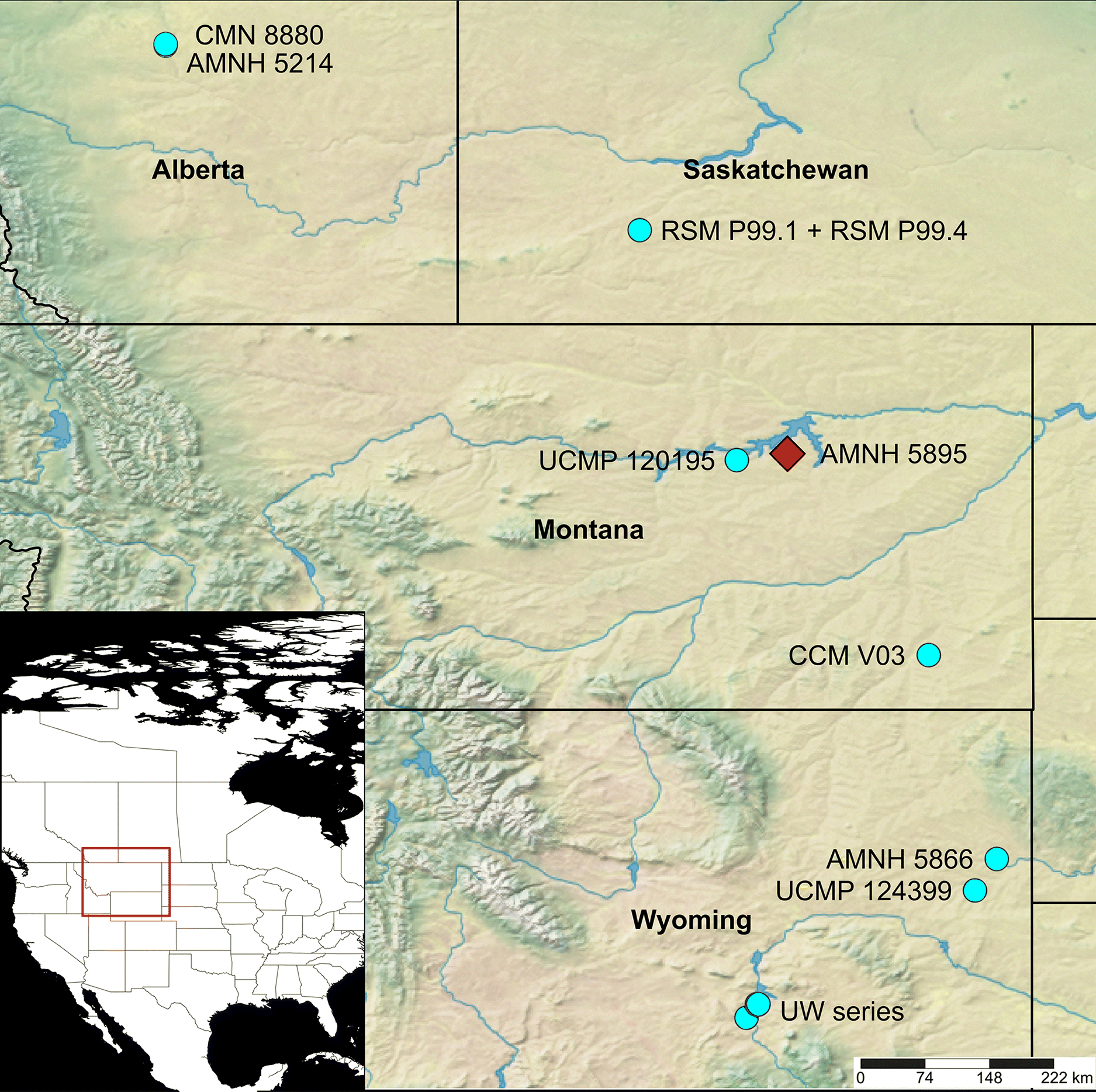
Map showing where Ankylosaurus fossils have been discovered; the holotype is shown in red (◆)

Ankylosaurus existed between 68 and 66 million years ago, in the final, or Maastrichtian, stage of the Late Cretaceous Period. It was among the last dinosaur genera that appeared before the Cretaceous–Paleogene extinction event. The type specimen is from the Hell Creek Formation of Montana, while other specimens have been found in the Lance and Ferris Formations in Wyoming, the Scollard Formation in Alberta, and the Frenchman Formation in Saskatchewan, all of which date to the end of the Cretaceous.

Fossils of Ankylosaurus are rare in the sediments it is known from, and the distribution of its remains suggests that it was ecologically rare, or restricted to the uplands of the formations, where it would have been less likely to fossilize, rather than the coastal lowlands. Another ankylosaur, a nodosaur referred to as Edmontonia sp., is also found in the same formations, but according to Carpenter, the range of the two genera does not seem to have overlapped. Their remains have so far not been found in the same localities, and the nodosaur appears to have inhabited the lowlands. The narrower muzzle of the nodosaur suggests it had a more selective diet than Ankylosaurus, further indicating ecological separation, whether their range overlapped or not.

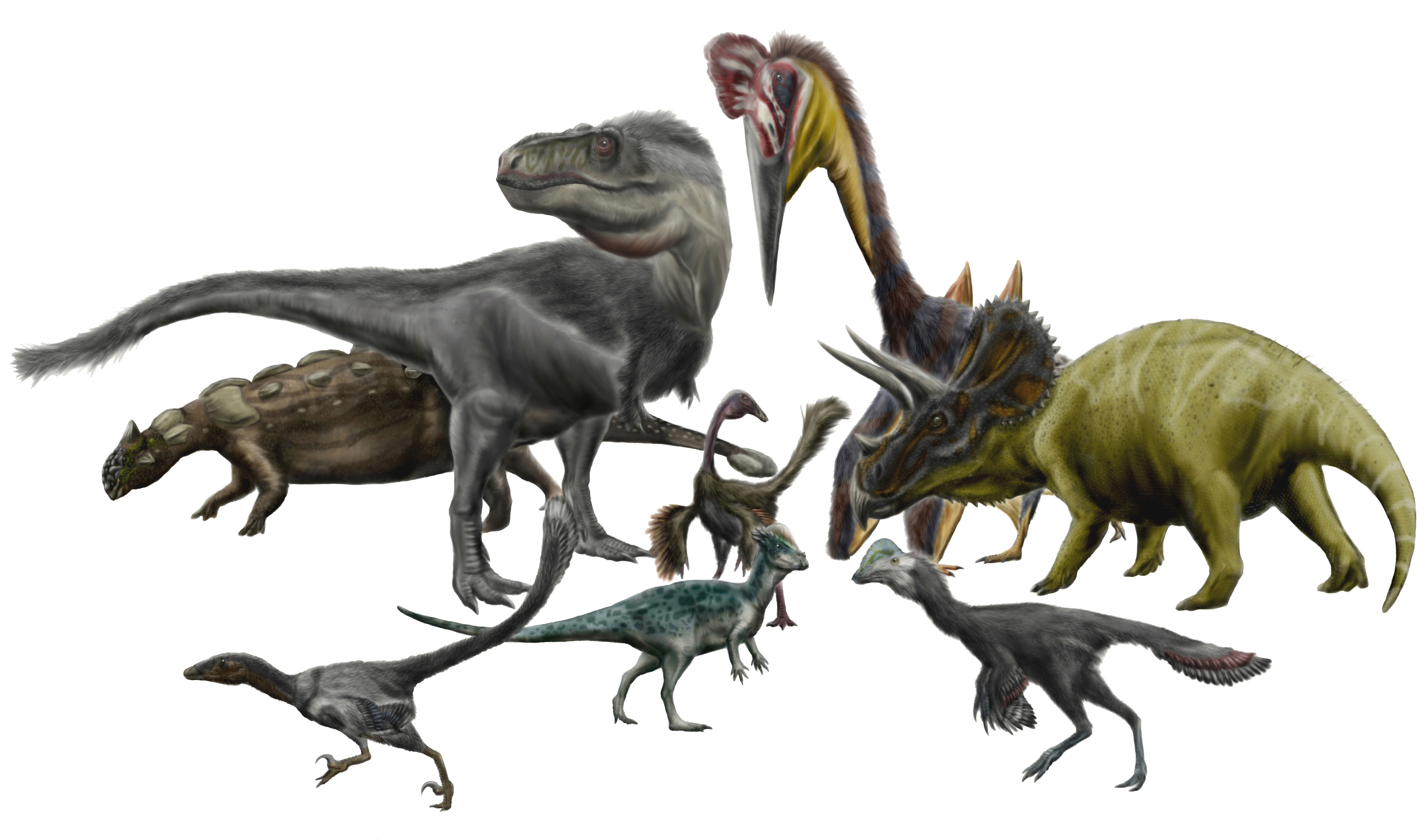
Restorations of Ankylosaurus and other animals of the Hell Creek Formation

With its low center of gravity, Ankylosaurus would have been unable to knock down trees like modern elephants do. It was also incapable of chewing bark and thus unlikely to have practiced bark stripping. As an adult, Ankylosaurus does not appear to have congregated in groups (though some ankylosaurs appear to have congregated when young). It is therefore improbable that Ankylosaurus was able to modify the landscape of its ecosystem in the way elephants do; hadrosaurids may instead have had such an "ecosystem engineer" role.

The formations where Ankylosaurus fossils have been found represent different sections of the western shore of the Western Interior Seaway dividing western and eastern North America during the Cretaceous, a broad coastal plain extending westward from the seaway to the newly formed Rocky Mountains. These formations are composed largely of sandstone and mudstone, which have been attributed to floodplain environments. The regions where Ankylosaurus and other Late Cretaceous ankylosaurs have been found had a warm subtropical/temperate climate, which was monsoonal, had occasional rainfall, tropical storms, and forest fires. In the Hell Creek Formation, many types of plants were supported, primarily angiosperms, with less common conifers, ferns and cycads. An abundance of fossil leaves found at dozens of different sites indicates that the area was largely forested by small trees. Ankylosaurus shared its environment with other dinosaurs that included the ceratopsids Triceratops and Torosaurus, the hypsilophodont Thescelosaurus, the hadrosaurid Edmontosaurus, an indeterminate nodosaur, the pachycephalosaurian Pachycephalosaurus, and the theropods Struthiomimus, Ornithomimus, Pectinodon, and Tyrannosaurus.

== Cultural significance ==
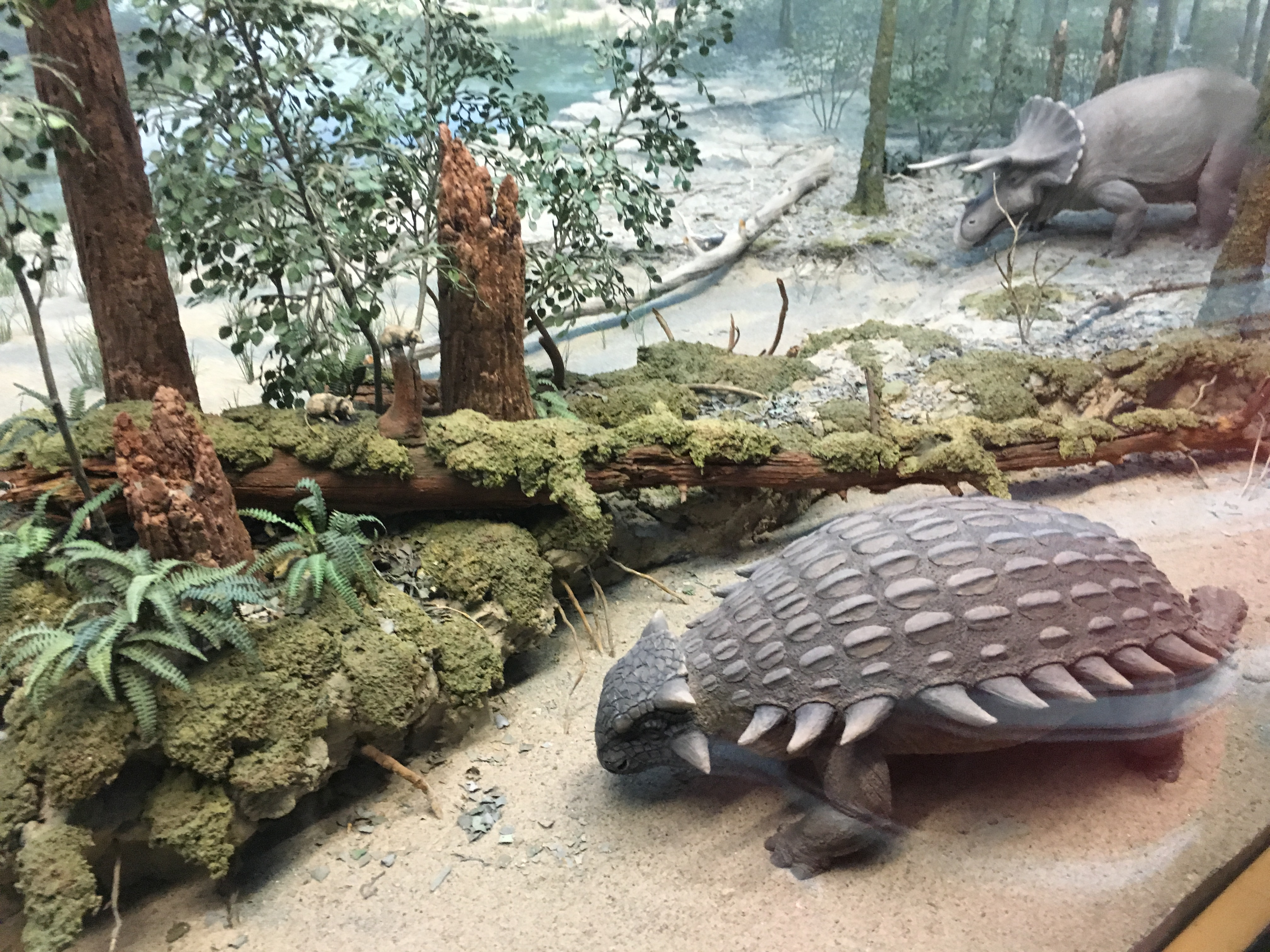
Replica of the 1964 World's Fair Ankylosaurus (note spikes and dragging tail), Royal Alberta Museum

Carpenter noted in 2004 that Ankylosaurus has become the archetypal member of its group, and the best-known ankylosaur in popular culture, perhaps due to a life-sized reconstruction of the animal being featured at the 1964 World's Fair in New York City. Arbour and Mallon called Ankylosaurus an "iconic" dinosaur in 2017, and noted that the World's Fair sculpture, as well as the American artist Rudolph Zallinger's 1947 mural The Age of Reptiles and other later popular depictions, showed Ankylosaurus with a tail club, following the first discovery of the feature in 1910.

Many traditional popular depictions show Ankylosaurus in a squatting posture and with a huge tail club being dragged over the ground. Modern reconstructions show the animal with a more upright limb posture and with the tail held off the ground. Likewise, large spines projecting sideways from the body (similar to those of nodosaurid ankylosaurs) are present in many traditional depictions, but are not known from Ankylosaurus itself. The armor of Ankylosaurus has often been conflated with that of Edmontonia (earlier referred to as Palaeoscincus); in addition to Ankylosaurus being depicted with spikes, Edmontonia has also been depicted with an Ankylosaurus-like tail club (a feature nodosaurids did not have), including in a mural by the American artist Charles R. Knight from 1930. Ankylosaurus has been featured in the Jurassic Park franchise, where they are depicted as attacking with their tails and running, abilities that have been criticized as unlikely by paleontologists.

== See also ==
- Timeline of ankylosaur research
