= March of Progress =

Illustration of human evolution

The original March of Progress illustration from Early Man (1965) with spread extended (top) and folded (bottom)

The March of Progress, originally titled The Road to Homo Sapiens, is an illustration that presents 25 million years of human evolution. It was created for the Early Man volume of the Life Nature Library, published in 1965, and drawn by the artist Rudolph Zallinger. It has been widely parodied and imitated to create images of progress of other kinds.

== Illustration ==
=== Context ===
The illustration is part of a section of text and images commissioned by Time-Life Books for the Early Man volume (1965) of the Life Nature Library, by F. Clark Howell.

The illustration is a foldout entitled "The Road to Homo Sapiens". It shows a sequence of figures, drawn by natural history painter and muralist Rudolph Zallinger (1919–1995). The 15 human evolutionary forebears are lined up as if they were marching in a parade from left to right. The first two sentences of the caption read "What were the stages of man's long march from apelike ancestors to sapiens? Beginning at right and progressing across four more pages are milestones of primate and human evolution as scientists know them today, pieced together from the fragmentary fossil evidence."

=== Sequence of species ===
The 15 primate figures in Zallinger's image, from left to right, are listed below. The datings follow the original graphic and may no longer reflect current scientific opinion.

- Pliopithecus, 22–12 million years old "ancestor of the gibbon line"
- Proconsul, 21–9 million years old primate which may or may not have qualified as an ape
- Dryopithecus, 15–8 million years old fossil ape, the first such found (1856) and probable ancestor of modern apes
- Oreopithecus, 15–8 million years old
- Ramapithecus, 13–8 million years old ape and possible ancestor of modern orangutans (now considered a female Sivapithecus)
- Australopithecus, 2–3 million years old; then considered the earliest "certain hominid"
- Paranthropus, 1.8–0.8 million years old
- Advanced Australopithecus (Homo habilis), 1.8–0.7 million years old
- Homo erectus, 700,000–400,000 years old, then the earliest known member of the genus Homo
- Early Homo sapiens, 300,000–200,000 years old; from Swanscombe, Steinheim and Montmaurin, then considered probably the earliest H. sapiens
- Solo Man, 100,000–50,000 years old; described as an extinct Asian "race" of H. sapiens (now considered a sub-species of H. erectus)
- Rhodesian Man, 50,000–30,000 years old; described as an extinct African "race" of H. sapiens (now considered either H. rhodesiensis or H. heidelbergensis and dated much earlier)
- Neanderthal Man, 100,000–40,000 years old
- Cro-Magnon Man, 40,000–5,000 years old
- Modern Man, 40,000 years to the present

=== Intention ===
Contrary to appearances and some complaints, the original 1965 text of "The Road to Homo Sapiens" reveals an understanding of the fact that a linear presentation of a sequence of primate species, all in the direct line of human ancestors, would not be a correct interpretation. For example, the fourth of Zallinger's figures (Oreopithecus) is said to be "a likely side branch on man's family tree". Only the next figure (Ramapithecus) is described as "now thought by some experts to be the oldest of man's ancestors in a direct line" (something no longer considered likely). That implies that the first four primates are not to be considered actual human ancestors. Likewise, the seventh figure (Paranthropus) is said to be "an evolutionary dead end". In addition, the colored stripes, across the top of the figure, which indicate the age and duration of the various lineages clearly imply that there is no evidence of direct continuity between extinct and extant lineages and also, multiple lineages of the figured hominids occurred contemporaneously at several points in the history of the group.

== Reception ==
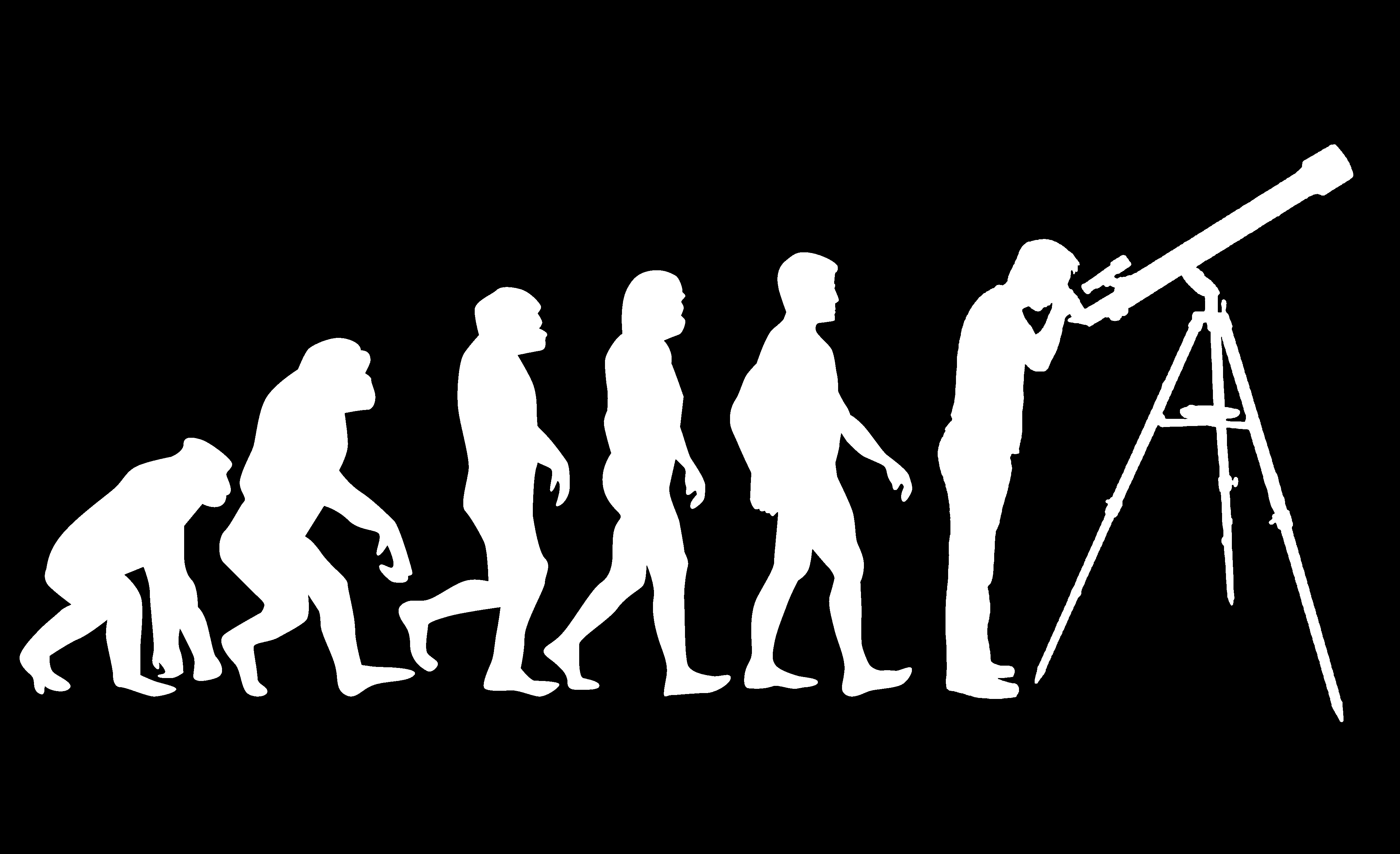
One of many versions of the progressionist meme: Astronomy Evolution 2 by Giuseppe Donatiello, 2016

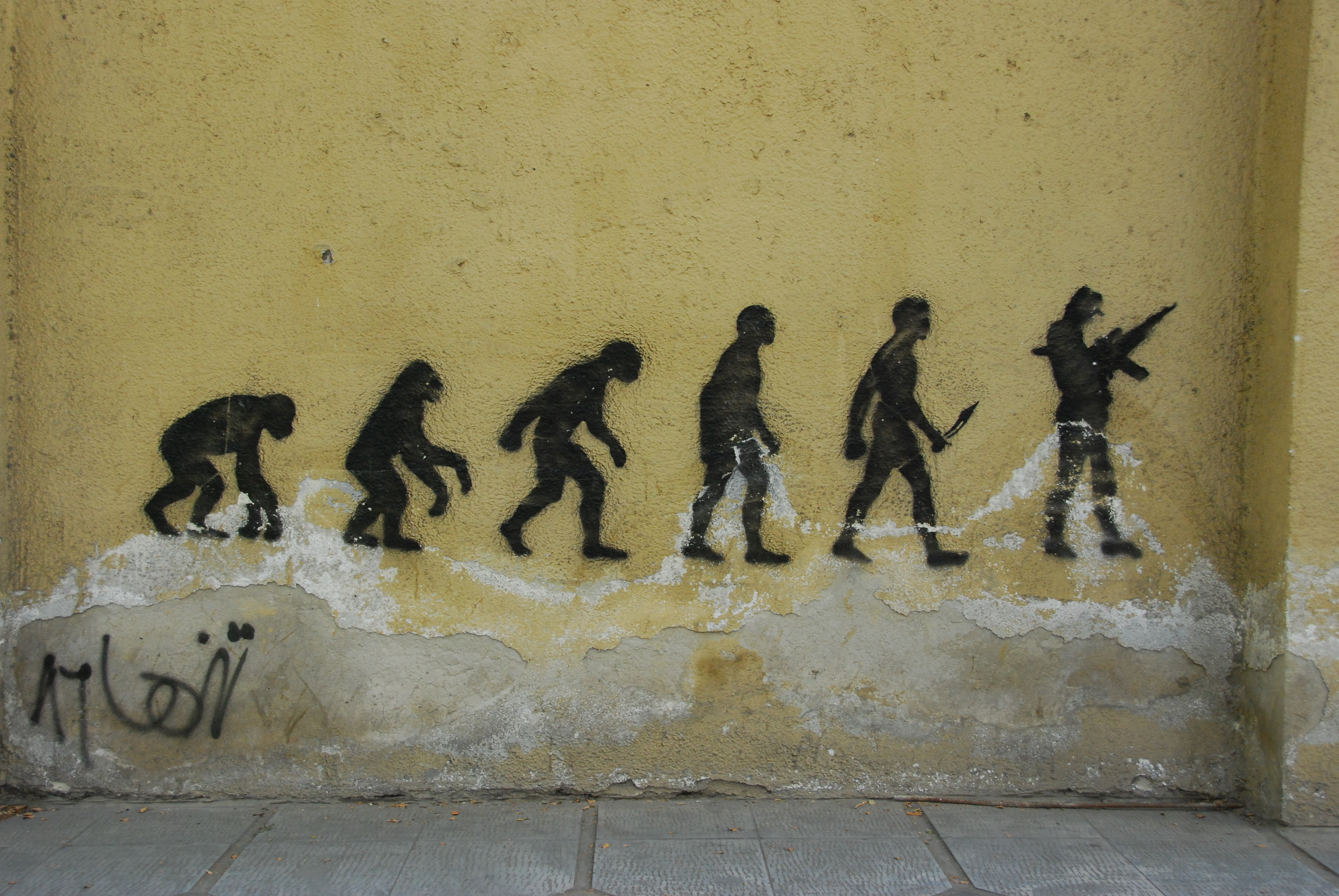
Anti-war mural, Tehran, 2007

The image has frequently been copied, modified, and parodied.

It has also been criticized as "unintentionally and wrongly" implying that "evolution is progressive". The image has been described as having a "visual logic" of linear progression. The Lancet called it "proverbial, much quoted or adapted, familiar to multitudes who have never seen its original version or heard of its maker". The image has become better-known than the science behind it.

With regard to the way the illustration has been interpreted, the anthropologist and author of the section, F. Clark Howell, remarked:

The artist didn't intend to reduce the evolution of man to a linear sequence, but it was read that way by viewers. ... The graphic overwhelmed the text. It was so powerful and emotional.

Paleontologist Stephen Jay Gould condemned the iconology of the image in several pages of his 1989 book, Wonderful Life, reproducing several advertisements and political cartoons that make use of the illustration to make their various points. In a chapter, "The Iconography of an Expectation", he asserted that

The march of progress is the canonical representation of evolution – the one picture immediately grasped and viscerally understood by all. ... The straitjacket of linear advance goes beyond iconography to the definition of evolution: the word itself becomes a synonym for progress. ... [But] life is a copiously branching bush, continually pruned by the grim reaper of extinction, not a ladder of predictable progress.

The intelligent design advocate Jonathan Wells wrote in Icons of Evolution: Science or Myth? (2002), "Although it is widely used to show that we are just animals, and that our very existence is a mere accident, the ultimate icon goes far beyond the evidence." The book likens a selection of evolution theory textbook topics to the cover illustration thus qualified.

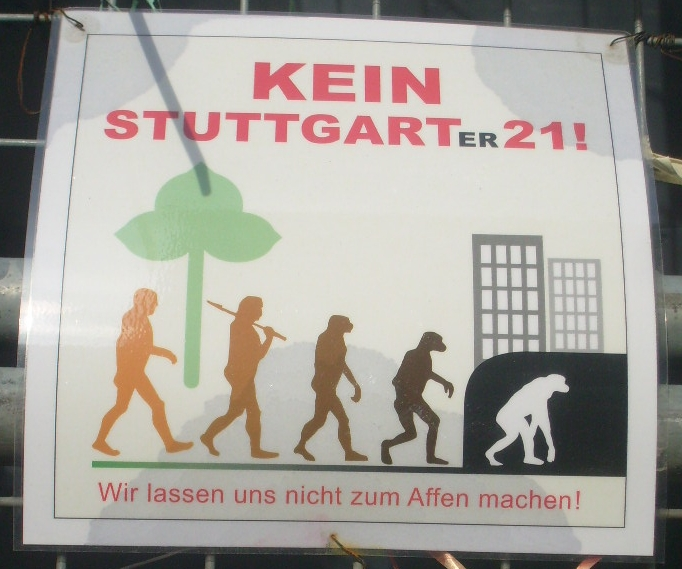
A German protest banner against the Stuttgart 21 project, 2010. The caption below the image reads "We will not allow ourselves to be made into monkeys!"

Riley Black, writing for Scientific American, traces the idea of a "march of progress" to the medieval great chain of being and the 19th century idea of the "missing link" in the fossil record. In her view, to understand life and evolution, "step one involves casting out types of imagery which constrain rather than enlighten." Writing in Wired, Black added that "There is perhaps no other illustration as immediately recognizable as representing evolution, but the tragedy of this is that it conveys a view of life that does not resemble our present understanding of life's history."

== Parodies and adaptations ==
The March of Progress has often been imitated, parodied, or adapted for commercial or political purposes. The cover of the 1972 Doors album Full Circle references the March of Progress, as does the 1985 Supertramp album Brother Where You Bound, while the poster for the 1992 comedy film Encino Man shows an ape evolving into a skateboarder. The December 2005 issue of The Economist depicts hominids progressing up a flight of stairs to transform into a woman in a black dress holding a glass of champagne to illustrate "The Story of Man".

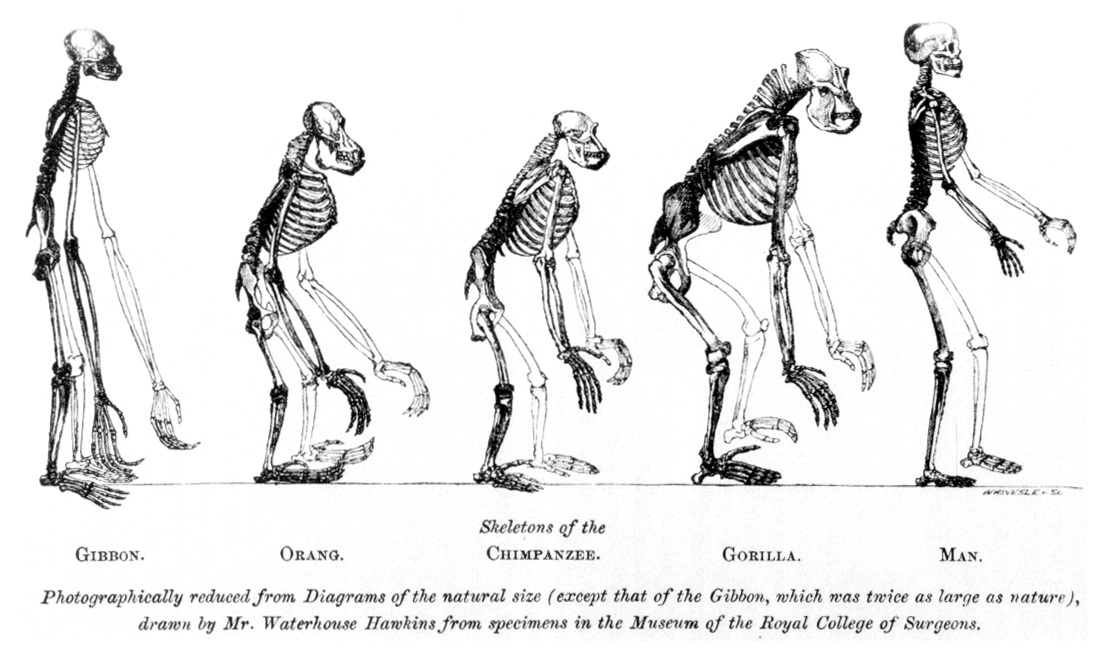
The frontispiece to Thomas Henry Huxley's 1863 Evidence as to Man's Place in Nature

== Predecessors ==
Thomas Henry Huxley added a frontispiece to his 1863 book Evidence as to Man's Place in Nature comparing the skeletons of apes and humans, but historian Jennifer Tucker argues that its left-to-right progressionist sequence unintentionally became "an iconic and instantly recognizable visual shorthand for evolution".

An illustration, with the caption "Evolution", showing two sequences of four images, each illustrating a gradual transformation of an animal into a human, appeared in the 1889 edition of Mark Twain's A Connecticut Yankee in King Arthur's Court.

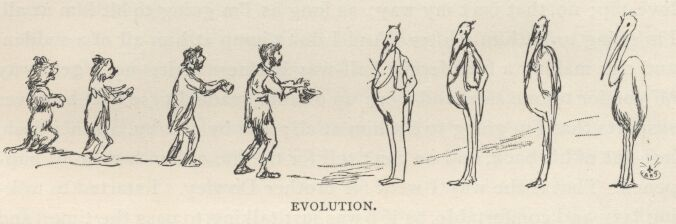
"Evolution" in Mark Twain's A Connecticut Yankee in King Arthur's Court (1889)
