= The Age of Reptiles =

1947 mural by Rudolph Zallinger

- Artist: Rudolph Zallinger
- Year: 1947; 79 years ago
- Type: Fresco
- Dimensions: 4.9 m × 34 m (16 ft × 110 ft)
- Location: Yale Peabody Museum, New Haven, Connecticut

The Age of Reptiles is a 110-foot (34 m) mural depicting the period of ancient history when reptiles were the dominant creatures on the earth, painted by Rudolph Zallinger. The fresco sits in the Yale Peabody Museum in New Haven, Connecticut, and was completed in 1947 after five years of work. The Age of Reptiles was at one time the largest painting in the world, and depicts a span of nearly 350 million years in Earth's history.

Painted in the Renaissance fresco-secco technique, The Age of Reptiles showcases the contemporary view of dinosaurs as slow, sluggish creatures (a view that has gradually been replaced by more active dinosaurs). Zallinger received the Addison Emery Verrill medal in 1980 for the mural.

== Background ==
Zallinger was an art student who in the early 1940s had been painting seaweed drawings for the Peabody museum. Albert E. Parr, then director of the Peabody Museum, had been unhappy with the appearance of the Great Hall of the museum, which he felt was devoid of color and barren. Parr asked Lewis York, Zallinger's professor at art school, if he knew anyone who would be able to fill a large wall space in the Hall; York recommended Zallinger. On March 1, 1942, Zallinger was officially appointed to the wall-painting project.

Initially, Zallinger planned on dividing the wall space, measuring 110 feet in length, 55 feet in width, and 26 feet in height, into separate panels. After discussions with his supervisors, Zallinger instead decided on a different concept, which would use the entire wall for a "panorama of time". Because Zallinger had never painted dinosaurs, Dr. G. Edward Lewis, the museum's curator of vertebrate paleontology, and Dr. George Wieland proceeded to give Zallinger a six-month crash course in vertebrate paleontology and paleobotany.

=== Painting ===
Zallinger sketched out his plan for the mural on a 10-foot-long (3.0 m) sheet of rag paper, which could be unrolled to edit individual sections. The position of entrances to the hall and the sequence of which Peabody's fossils are arranged made the mural be "read" from right to left, instead of the customary direction.

Zallinger used a Renaissance-era painting technique known as fresco-secco. Though rarely used because of the difficulties of using egg tempera, fresco-secco allowed Zallinger to delineate character as well as create a painting with good durability.

== Composition ==
In total, The Age of Reptiles spans about 362 million years, from the Devonian Period at the mural's beginning to the end of the Cretaceous Period, 65 million years ago. Each period's length on the mural is proportional to the period's length in geologic time. Each period of time is divided by large trees in the foreground.

=== Species depicted ===
Animal species are in bold.

Devonian

- **Cheirolepis**
- **Eusthenopteron**
- Eospermatopteris
- Calamites

Carboniferous

- **Eogyrinus**
- **Diplovertebron**
- **Meganeuron**
- **Eryops**
- Lepidodendron
- Sigillaria

Permian

- **Seymouria**
- **Limnoscelis**
- **Varanosaurus**
- **Ophiacodon**
- **Sphenacodon**
- **Araeoscelis**
- **Dimetrodon**
- **Edaphosaurus**
- Cordaites

Triassic

- **Saltoposuchus**
- **Plateosaurus**
- **Podokesaurus**
- **Cynognathus**
- Araucarioxylon
- Bjuvia
- Wielandiella
- Macrotaeniopteris

Jurassic

- **Camptosaurus**
- **Compsognathus**
- **Allosaurus**
- **Archaeopteryx**
- **Stegosaurus**
- **Rhamphorhynchus**
- **Brontosaurus**
- Williamsonia
- Cycadeoidea
- Araucarites
- Matonidium
- Neocalamites
- Schizoneura

Cretaceous

- **Anatosaurus**
- **Ankylosaurus**
- **Tyrannosaurus**
- **Pteranodon**
- **Triceratops**
- **Struthiomimus**
- Ginkgo
- Sabalites
- Palmetto
- Pandanus
- Cornus
- Magnolia
- Salix
- Sassafras
- Quercus

== Impact ==
The Age of Reptiles won Zallinger several awards. Zallinger was awarded with a Pulitzer Fellowship in Art in 1949, and the painting was featured as a postage stamp in 1970.

Despite its somewhat outdated view of dinosaurs, The Age of Reptiles is still notable for its historical and artistic merit and as the largest natural history painting in the world. It has been an inspiration to many visitors, including both Robert Bakker and Peter Dodson, who credit it with influencing them to become paleontologists. Dodson was nearly moved to tears upon first seeing it as a college senior.
