= Rudolph Zallinger =

American painter (1919–1995)

Rudolph F. Zallinger
- Born: Rudolph Franz Zallinger; 12 November 1919; Irkutsk, Russian SFSR
- Died: 1 August 1995 (aged 75); Branford, Connecticut, U.S.
- Resting place: Grove Street Cemetery, New Haven, Connecticut, U.S.
- Education: Yale School of Art; University of New Haven
- Known for: Painting, educator
- Notable work: The Age of Reptiles (1947); Great Seattle Fire (1953); March of Progress (1965); The Age of Mammals (1967); Early History of Hartford (1986)
- Style: Fresco-secco
- Spouse: Jean Farquharson Day (m. 1941)
- Awards: Pulitzer Fellowship (1949); Addison Emery Verrill Medal (1980); James Frances Bent award (1988)

Rudolph Franz Zallinger (German pronunciation: [ˈru:dɔlf ˈtsa:lɪŋɐ]; November 12, 1919 – August 1, 1995) was an American-based Austrian-Russian artist. His most notable works include his mural The Age of Reptiles (1947) at Yale University's Peabody Museum of Natural History, and the March of Progress (1965) with numerous parodies and versions. His painting of a Tyrannosaurus heavily influenced the creature design of Toho Studios' Godzilla (1954). Two of Zallinger's dinosaurs—the T. rex and Brontosaurus—are seen in that film as part of a slide demonstration during a lecture in the National Diet Building.

Born in Russia, he was raised in Seattle and became a prominent member of Yale University after painting his murals, gaining him awards and honors. He made illustrations for Life magazine and illustrations for dinosaur books, which made more people aware of his mural work. Because of the time in which they were painted, his murals have errors that are noticeable today but still remain a large achievement in his life.

== Early life and education ==
Rudolph Franz Zallinger was born in Irkutsk, Siberia in 1919 to Siberian refugees, Franz Xavier Zallinger and Maria Maria (Koncheravich) Zallinger. Zallinger had one sister. His family immigrated to Seattle, Washington in 1924.

Zallinger graduated at the Queen Anne High School in 1937. In 1938, he won a scholarship at Yale University when he was urged to apply by John Butler, an artist from Seattle. He graduated in 1942 with a Bachelor of Fine Arts. He later got a Master of Fine Arts at the Yale university in 1971, and a Doctor of Fine Arts at the University of New Haven, in 1980.

== Career ==
The same year Zallinger graduated from Yale University, he worked as a teacher in painting in Yale School of Fine Arts from 1942 to 1950 where he painted his famous The Age of Reptiles. He worked as an instructor for five years, and then two more until 1950 as an assistant professor. In 1950, he went back to Seattle to work as a freelance artist and taught at the Burnley School (now called The Art Institute of Seattle) for three years before returning to Yale again after accepting a commission by Life magazine to create The Age of Mammals. Once he returned, the museum appointed him as the "artist-in-residence", a position he held until his death. He also enrolled as a Fellow in Geology to study for his next work.

From 1961 to his death, he worked in the University of Hartford in Connecticut, during which he worked on the mural of The Age of Mammals and received the James E. and Frances W. Bent Award from that university. He continued to work on other projects, such as his Early History of Hartford.

== Paintings and drawings ==
=== The Age of Reptiles (1947) ===
Perhaps Zallinger's most well-known piece of art, The Age of Reptiles is a 110 feet (34 meters) wide by 16 feet (4.9 meters) tall mural, occupying the full length of the east wall of the Yale Peabody Museum's Great Hall. It was painted from 1943 to 1947, with the help of a six-month crash course in animal and plant life of the distant past and comparative anatomy with Yale's professors. Such professors include Carl Owen Dunbar (the Director of the Peabody Museum at Yale University, 1942–1959), Richard Swann Lull, G. Edward Lewis, and George Wieland. It features a timeline of 350 million years of animal and plant evolution, showing the rise and fall of dinosaurs as the rulers of Earth. Zallinger used trees to divide it into the various periods of geologic time, as the chronology moves from right to left. This was later reversed when used in Life magazine to go from left to right in 1952.

The museum's Great Hall had the fossil reconstructions of various dinosaurs, including that of an Apatosaurus with an incorrect skull. However, the wall looked too empty for oceanographer and director of the Peabody Museum of Natural History (1938–1942), Albert Eide Parr. He wanted to make a series of small paintings on the east wall, depicting what those skeletons would have looked like. In 1941, Parr decided to put the task to Zallinger, a student at Yale University at the time who had been painting marine algae for him. Lewis York, an art professor at the School of Fine Arts, also suggested that Zallinger would be up to the task. Along with this, his wife is quoted as saying:

"We were in the art school, and he'd done some drawings of seaweed for Albert Parr, head of the Peabody Museum of Natural History. When Parr was looking for a design to put on the wall, an art professor told him to use the guy who did his seaweed."

In 1942, Zallinger was hired to do this work, but he proposed to do a large-scale mural, rather than small individual paintings, yielding a panoramic timeline. He spent 6 months doing research, then created a sketch nearly 7 feet (2.1 meters) long, quite similar to the finished result. He then coloured it and added details, which took him nearly a year, and used egg tempera. In 1943, he began his drawing of the mural, using charcoal. He painted it using the fresco-secco technique, most often used in the 15th century. The underpainting was finished in 1944, and the mural was finally completed in June 1947. A portion of the mural appeared on a United States postage stamp in 1970.

=== Great Seattle Fire (1953) ===
A 10 feet high by 24 feet wide (3 by 7.3 meters) mural was commissioned by General Insurance Company of America (SAFECO) in 1953. The mural depicts the Great Seattle Fire which occurred on June 6, 1889. Zallinger spent a long time researching and studying historic photos and their every detail to capture the moment of that fire. The painting was unveiled in 1953, at the Museum of History & Industry, with 50 surviving witnesses and 100 other curious visitors at the event. It was intended to celebrate the first anniversary of the opening of the Museum of History & Industry. In the painting, the artist's perspective was from the intersection of Yesler Way, 1st Avenue, and James Street, in what is now Pioneer Square, looking east up steep Yesler Hill.

=== March of Progress (1965) ===
The March of Progress (as it is commonly called, although it is titled "The Road to Homo sapiens") was created for the Early Man volume of the Life Nature Library, published in 1965 by Time Life. It shows the evolution of man, from ape to Homo sapiens. Many consider this to be wrong as it presents a "linear evolution", whereas evolution is much more complex, and thus has been heavily criticized despite making its way into popular culture. Many parodies have been made, as it stands as one of the most recognizable scientific images of all time.

=== The Age of Mammals (1967) ===
As Zallinger had previously done work for Life magazine, they commissioned another work of art from him, The Age of Mammals. The drawing for The Age of Mammals was published in October 1953, but there were insufficient funds to begin work on the mural until the 1960s. In 1961, Zallinger began work on the 60 by 5.5 feet (18.3 by 1.7 meters) mural on the south wall of the Hall of Mammalian Evolution in Yale's Peabody Museum of Natural History. Its chronology moves from left to right, and it depicts a variety of plants, animals and landscapes of western North America in the span of 65 million years. It shows the domination of mammals after the extinction of the dinosaurs 65 million years ago to the Ice Age about 10,000 years ago. It was painted using the fresco-secco technique.

=== Early History of Hartford (1986) ===
A mural made in Zallinger's later life, it depicts the history of Hartford, Connecticut, from the landing of Puritan colonial leader Thomas Hooker in Connecticut, to around the time Zallinger had been born. It depicts people helping build the city, but forgets to display the enslaved black men and woman who also helped build it. It is on permanent display at the Hartford Public Library on the main floor.

== Life magazine ==
The Age of Reptiles earned Zallinger recognition from the Pulitzer Foundation in 1949 but remained unknown to most of America. It wasn't popular until New Haven's former mayor Richard C. Lee, at that time head of the Yale News Bureau, brought it to the attention of the editors of Life magazine. Soon after, it was published in Life in 1952, which gained it much attention. However, this wasn't the only assignment Zallinger received from Life. His paintings portrayed reptiles and dinosaurs, he painted eight pages of the tropical rain forests of Dutch Guiana, drew animals and birds with his wife Jean Day Zallinger, recreated scenes of the Minoans in ancient Crete, contributed to illustrations in the series "The World We Live In", "Wonders of Life on Earth", two of the 12 chapters in "The Epic of Man", illustrated a series on the Russian Revolution, and many others.

=== Other books ===
Zallinger's artistic talent was apparent and he offered to do book cover work. He worked with authors Willy Ley (1906–1969) and Frank H. T. Rhodes. He first illustrated Ley's book, Worlds of the Past, published in 1971. The book talks about various life forms around the world and the science behind them based on the studies of paleontologists. The cover features three dinosaurs. Rhodes's book, Evolution, was published in 1974 and was illustrated by Zallinger and Rebecca A. Merrilees (1922–2012). He also illustrated the book Dinosaurs for Golden Press in 1960.

== Awards and honors ==
Zallinger's first award was an honorable mention for the Prix-de-Rome in 1941. After finishing the mural The Age of Reptiles, in 1947, he received the Pulitzer Award for Painting in 1949. He received the Addison Emery Verrill Medal for "outstanding contributions to the field of natural history," which was presented to him by A. Bartlett Giamatti (then president of Yale University) at a ceremony in the Great Hall on February 29, 1980. He was the first non-scientist to receive this medal. He was also given Doctor of Fine Arts by the university. The inscription reads:

"Rudolph Franz Zallinger, artist and teacher, your great natural history murals at the Peabody Museum are a fusion of scientific accuracy and artistic genius. Guided by your own diligent research and painstaking collaboration with scientists, your imagination has allowed us a glimpse into past worlds no human eye ever witnessed. It was your innovation to blend the static frames of successive geologic ages into grand panoramas that sweep through time, capturing the dynamic force of life as it evolved."

At 69 years old (1988), Zallinger received the James E. and Frances W. Bent Award, which is given annually to a faculty member of the University of Hartford for "unusual creativity and innovation in the pursuit of his or her scholarship".

== Family ==
While studying at Yale, he met the artist and illustrator Jean Farquharson Day (1918–2007). They married on September 27, 1941, and had three children, all artists: Peter Franz Zallinger (1943–2025) Kristina Zallinger (1945–), and Lisa Day David (1949–). Zallinger's wife was an American artist and children's book illustrator for dozens of books.

== Death ==
Rudolph Zallinger died on August 1, 1995, of cancer in Branford, Connecticut.
