= Deaths in December 1979 =

The following is a list of notable deaths in December 1979. Entries for each day are listed alphabetically by surname. A typical entry lists information in the following sequence:

- Name, age, country of citizenship at birth, subsequent country of citizenship (if applicable), reason for notability, cause of death (if known), and reference.

== December 1979 ==
=== 1 ===
- Eduardo Blanco Amor, 82, Spanish writer and journalist.
- Bob Bowes, 57, British teacher and actor.
- Kishansinh Chavda, 75, Indian writer and journalist.
- Noel Estrada, 61, Puerto Rican composer ("En mi Viejo San Juan").
- Geoffrey Faithfull, 86, British cinematographer (Village of the Damned).
- Max Jacobson, 79, German-American physician.
- Lajos Maszlay, 76, Hungarian Olympic fencer (1948, 1952).
- Pierre Meuldermans, 65, Belgian footballer.
- Muhammad Abdel Moneim, 80, Egyptian royal.
- Alexander Petrie, 98, South African classicist.
- Sandra Storme, 64, English actress.
- Clyde Swendsen, 84, American Olympic diver (1920) and water polo coach.
- Jack Young, 71, Australian footballer.

=== 2 ===
- Frank Cresswell, 71, English footballer.
- Sam Dailey, 75, American baseball player.
- Helen Fraser, 98, Scottish-Australian politician and suffragist.
- Victor Lucas, 72, Australian footballer.
- Selma Mushkin, 65, American health economist, cancer.
- Dušan Petković, 76, Yugoslav footballer.
- Jan Pijnenburg, 73, Dutch Olympic racing cyclist (1928).
- John Rae, 75, New Zealand politician, MP (1949–1957, 1960–1972).
- Joe Schertzl, 56, Canadian ice hockey player.
- Vasily Solovyov-Sedoy, 72, Soviet composer.
- John Walton, 91, English cricketer.

=== 3 ===
- Nathaniel Oglesby Calloway, 72, American chemist and physician, cancer.
- Dhyan Chand, 74, Indian Olympic field hockey player (1928, 1932, 1936), three-time gold medalist, liver cancer.
- Ella Kam Oon Chun, 64, American journalist.
- Sir John Forsdyke, 96, British museum curator, bronchitis.
- John A. Graham, 68, American politician, member of the Illinois Senate (since 1958).
- Fred Harrison, 86, Australian footballer.
- Joseph Kahn, 63, Soviet-American shipping executive.
- František Kriegel, 71, Czechoslovak politician.
- Carl B. Koford, 64, American biologist.
- Josie Mpama, 76, South African civil rights activist, traffic collision.
- Alighiero Noschese, 47, Italian actor and entertainer, suicide by gunshot.
- Shanta S. Rao, 56, Indian medical researcher.
- Cecil E. Rhode, 77, American journalist and wildlife photographer.
- John S. Richards, 87, American librarian.
- Hans Rohde, 64, German footballer.
- Jack Shelley, 74, Australian footballer.
- Sir Henry Slesser, 96, English politician and barrister, MP (1924–1929).
- Zhang Guotao, 82, Chinese-Canadian politician, co-founder of the Chinese Communist Party.

=== 4 ===
- Bert Delmas, 68, American baseball player.
- Pedro Dibut, 87, Cuban baseball player.
- Petya Dubarova, 17, Bulgarian poet, suicide by drug overdose.
- Friedrich Ebert Jr., 85, German politician.
- Robert Karnes, 62, American actor, heart failure.
- Zoltan Kondorossy, 73, Romanian Olympic wrestler (1936).
- E. L. Mayo, 75, American poet, heart failure.
- Walther Müller, 74, German-American physicist.
- Ray Smith, 61, American country musician.

=== 5 ===
- Józef Chałasiński, 75, Polish sociologist.
- John M. Conroy, 58, American aviator and businessman, colon cancer.
- Teresa De Simone, 22, English bartender, strangled.
- Sonia Delaunay, 94, Russian-born French artist.
- Maurice Dorléac, 78, French actor.
- Joseph-Anaclet Habel, 84, Canadian politician, MP (1953–1968).
- James Hughes, 84–85, British Anglican prelate.
- Minnie Lichtenstein Marcus, 97, American businesswoman (Neiman Marcus).
- Rosaleen Norton, 62, Australian artist and occultist, colon cancer.
- Buford Nunley, 67, American baseball player.
- Jesse Pearson, 49, American actor and screenwriter, cancer.
- Lesley Selander, 79, American film director.
- Richard Shrimpton, 69, British Olympic boxer (1936).
- Henrietta Buckler Seiberling, 91, American anti-alcohol activist (Alcoholics Anonymous).
- Henry Wagener, 88, American politician, member of the Minnesota Senate (1943–1954).

=== 6 ===
- Carlos Camacho, 55, Guamanian politician, governor (1969–1975), cancer.
- Tom Crawford, 69, English cricketer.
- Thomas Engel, 52, New Zealand rower.
- Fritz T. Epstein, 80–81, German-American writer.
- Albert Lewis Fletcher, 83, American Roman Catholic prelate.
- Casey Robinson, 76, American filmmaker.
- Lancelot Spicer, 86, British politician.
- Mal Stevens, 79, American football player and coach.
- Douglas Strawbridge, 71, New Zealand politician.

=== 7 ===
- Mari Andriessen, 82, Dutch sculptor.
- Nicolas Born, 41, German writer, cancer.
- Eddie Gottlieb, 81, American basketball coach and executive.
- Walter A. Haas, 90, American businessman.
- Yoko Matsuoka, 63, Japanese writer and activist, lung cancer.
- Johnny McCreedy, 62, Canadian ice hockey player, cancer.
- Irving D. Neustein, 78, American politician and lawyer.
- Cecilia Payne-Gaposchkin, 79, British-born American astronomer.
- Brajeshwar Prasad, 68, Indian politician, MP (1952–1967).
- Shahriar Shafiq, 34, Egyptian-Iranian naval officer, shot.
- Leopold Siemens, 90, German naval admiral.
- Leonard Stick, 87, Canadian politician, MP (1949–1958).
- Cavit Orhan Tütengil, 57–58, Turkish sociologist and writer, shot.
- Augusto César Vatteone, 75, Argentine filmmaker.
- Earl Warweg, 87, American football player and architect.
- Paul B. Wishart, 81, American businessman.

=== 8 ===
- Federico Bucher, 68, Chilean politician.
- Tom Ferguson, 87, American football player.
- Ruth Chrisman Gannett, 82, American illustrator (My Father's Dragon).
- Robert Grimston, 1st Baron Grimston of Westbury, 82, British politician, MP (1931–1964).
- Nikolai Gritsenko, 67, Soviet actor.
- Peirson Mitchell Hall, 85, American judge.
- Charles Kohler, 79, Swiss-born Romanian footballer.
- Jaan Pakk, 78, Estonian conductor.
- Hetty Perkins, c. 84, Australian Arrernte leader.
- Jennifer Rankin, 38, Australian poet and playwright, cancer.
- Peter Scawen Watkinson Roberts, 62, English naval officer.
- Frances Taylor, 70, American lyricist and media critic.
- Hartley Teakle, 78, Australian conservationist, brain cancer.
- Hilda Wallis, 79, Irish Olympic tennis player (1924).
- Del Young, 67, American baseball player.

=== 9 ===
- Alexander Louis Arch, 85, Hungarian-born American soldier.
- Rue "Willie" Corré, 84, British vaudeville comedian (Willie, West and McGinty).
- Gerti Deutsch, 70, Austrian-born British photographer.
- Tommy Jackson, 53, American fiddler.
- Hjalmar Peter Johansen, 87, Danish Olympic gymnast (1912).
- Larry McCoy, 37, American racing driver, suicide.
- Sir Ernest Dunstan Morgan, 83, Sierra Leonean philanthropist.
- Otto Müller, 81, German painter.
- James Neilson, 70, American television director.
- Franco Orgera, 71, Italian Olympic pentathlete (1936).
- Freeman Harrison Owens, 89, American filmmaker and photographer.
- Fulton J. Sheen, 84, American Roman Catholic prelate, heart disease.
- Christer Sjösten, 31, Swedish racing cyclist, injuries sustained in a racing crash.
- Jack Solomons, 78, British boxing promoter.
- Jean Hamilton Walls, 94, American educator.

=== 10 ===
- Niels Blach, 86, Danish Olympic field hockey player (1920).
- Sir Duncan Cumming, 76, British colonial administrator.
- Ann Dvorak, 68, American actress, cancer.
- Robert Elderfield, 75, American chemist.
- Sir Jack Keith Murray, 90, Australian colonial administrator.
- Margarete Nischwitz, 88, German politician.
- Gene Smith, 74, American football player.
- Margaret McClure Stitt, 93, American composer and playwright.
- Mogens Truelsen, 78, Danish Olympic sprinter (1924).
- Louis Round Wilson, 102, American librarian.

=== 11 ===
- José Caracci Vignatti, 92, Italian-born Chilean painter.
- Claire Carleton, 66, American actress, cancer.
- William Delday, 66, Canadian politician.
- Fayette S. Dunn, 76, American businessman.
- James J. Gibson, 75, American psychologist.
- Lucjan Kintopf, 81, Polish painter.
- Bill Lyte, 81, Australian footballer.
- E. A. Mitchell, 69, American businessman and politician, member of the U.S. House of Representatives (1947–1949).
- Jack Palmer, 76, Australian cricketer.
- Carlo Schmid, 83, German politician.
- Otto Schury, 76, German general.
- Nicolae Simatoc, 59, Romanian football player and manager, heart attack.
- Arnold E. True, 78, American naval admiral.

=== 12 ===
- Nick Dumovich, 77, American baseball player.
- Hilo Hattie, 78, American singer, dancer and actress, cancer.
- James Lewicki, 61, American artist and illustrator.
- Charlotte Radcliffe, 76, English Olympic swimmer (1920).
- Goronwy Rees, 70, Welsh journalist, cancer.
- Bhoj Raj Seth, 72, Indian engineer and academic administrator.
- Alan Shipman, 78, English cricketer.
- Maximilián Ujtelky, 64, Slovak chess player.
- Babubhai P. Vaidya, 70, Indian politician and journalist.
- Leonard Johnston Wills, 95, British geologist.

=== 13 ===
- Florence Hochschild Austrian, 90, American artist.
- Alfred Bengsch, 58, German Roman Catholic cardinal, lung cancer.
- Walter Bosse, 75, Austrian artist and ceramicist.
- Anne Conlon, 40, Australian feminist and labor activist.
- Edgar Garbisch, 80, American football player and art collector, stroke.
- Jon Hall, 64, American actor (The Hurricane, The Invisible Man's Revenge, Ramar of the Jungle), suicide by gunshot.
- Bill Johnstone, 79, Australian footballer.
- Behçet Necatigil, 63, Turkish poet.
- Jacques Palzer, 79, Luxembourgish Olympic gymnast (1924).
- Džems Raudziņš, 69, Latvian basketball player.
- Edward Stewart, 78, New Zealand rugby player.
- Manoel de Castro Villas Bôas, 72, Brazilian journalist.

=== 14 ===
- Luis Aguilera Báez, 60, Chilean politician.
- Emil Belluš, 80, Slovak architect.
- Milton H. Bren, 75, American film producer, brain cancer.
- Nirode Chowdhury, 56, Indian cricketer.
- Peter Donlon, 72, American Olympic rower (1928).
- Sturt de Burgh Griffith, 74, Australian engineer and journalist.
- Václav Havel, 59, Czechoslovak Olympic canoeist (1948).
- Ken Leishman, 48, Canadian robber, plane crash.
- Charles McBurney, 65, British-American archaeologist.
- Otto Monsen, 92, Norwegian Olympic track and field athlete (1908, 1912).
- Willie Nixon, 63, American baseball player.
- Eberhard Rodt, 84, German general.
- Ben Rothwell, 77, American Olympic boxer (1924).
- Vinnie Smith, 64, American baseball player and umpire.
- Andrew Thorndike, 70, German filmmaker.
- Gerard van Leur, 62, Dutch footballer.

=== 15 ===
- Jackie Brenston, 51, American singer ("Rocket 88") and saxophonist, heart attack.
- Sheila Fell, 48, English artist, alcohol poisoning.
- Smacka Fitzgibbon, 49, Australian banjoist, stroke.
- Bill Gooderham, 60, Canadian Olympic sailor (1948, 1952).
- Stan Hack, 70, American baseball player.
- David N. Hitchcock, 61, American politician and lawyer, member of the Wyoming Senate (1951–1955, 1967–1979), suicide by gunshot.
- Bern Hoffman, 66, American actor (Li'l Abner).
- Ethel Lackie, 72, American Olympic swimmer (1924).
- Sherman P. Lloyd, 65, American politician, member of the U.S. House of Representatives (1963–1965, 1967–1973), cancer.
- Santiago Mederos, 35, Cuban baseball player, traffic collision.
- Georg Trexler, 76, German composer.

=== 16 ===
- Syed Barkatullah Barkat, 73–74, Indian poet and Islamic scholar.
- Omer Corteyn, 83, Belgian Olympic sprinter (1920).
- Murray Gurfein, 72, American judge, heart attack.
- Allan Guy, 89, Australian politician, MP (1929–1934, 1940–1946) and senator (1950–1956).
- George Halas Jr., 54, American football executive, heart attack.
- Valma Howell, 83, Australian artist and actress.
- J. A. Lindon, c. 75, English poet.
- Sergio Marchi, 59, Italian footballer.
- Raymond S. McKeough, 91, American politician, member of the U.S. House of Representatives (1935–1943).
- Pérrine Moncrieff, 86, English-born New Zealand writer and conservationist.
- Vagif Mustafazadeh, 39, Soviet Azerbaijani pianist and composer, heart attack.
- Maneklal Sankalchand Thacker, 75, Indian engineer and academic.
- Franz Zinner, 77, German Olympic weightlifter (1928).

=== 17 ===
- Robert William Alexander, 74, Irish novelist.
- Isaac Delano, 75, Nigerian writer and political activist.
- Anne Marie Heiler, 90, German politician.
- A. J. Iversen, 91, Danish furniture designer.
- Harold Jackson, 91, Irish cricketer.
- George Mills, 63, New Zealand cricketer.
- Arturo Schaerer, 72, Paraguayan businessman, journalist and publisher.

=== 18 ===
- Mollah Jalaluddin Ahmed, 53, Bangladeshi politician, MP (1973–1975, since 1979).
- Samuel Lansana Bangura, 49, Sierra Leonean banker and civil servant, murdered.
- Henny Lindorff Buckhøj, 77, Danish actress.
- Marcel Edme, 55, French soldier, helicopter crash.
- J. Eugene Goddard, 78, American politician, member of the New York State Assembly (1949–1964), heart attack.
- Edwin J. Godden, 91, English-born Canadian politician.
- Arturo Mas, 78, Spanish Olympic sailor (1924).
- Barnes Milam, 73, American football player and coach.
- Mohammad Mofatteh, 51, Iranian theologian and philosopher, shot.
- Padampat Singhania, 74, Indian businessman.
- Franz Suchomel, 72, Czech-German Nazi official and war criminal.
- Foy E. Wallace, 83, American preacher and writer, stroke.
- Razia Sajjad Zaheer, 61, Indian writer.

=== 19 ===
- Donald Creighton, 77, Canadian historian, cancer.
- Marcel David, 84, French politician.
- François Fontan, 50, French politician.
- Ali Gafarov, 44, Soviet Azerbaijani writer and playwright.
- Voyle Gilmore, 67, American record producer.
- Frédéric Grossmann, 84, French Olympic rower (1920).
- Claus Juell, 77, Norwegian Olympic sailor (1920).
- Wilhelm Kaisen, 92, German politician.
- Jack MacKenzie, 87, British-born American cinematographer.
- Thomas O'Malley, 76, American politician, member of the U.S. House of Representatives (1933–1939), embolism.
- Joseph-Émile Perron, 86, Canadian politician.
- Ben L. Silberstein, 77, American hotelier and real estate lawyer, lymphoma.
- Bud Sketchley, 60, Canadian-born American baseball player.
- Friedrich Stahl, 90, German general.
- Ralph M. Waters, 96, American anesthesiologist.

=== 20 ===
- Benny Davis, 84, American vaudeville performer and songwriter.
- Max Delvalle, 68, Panamanian politician, vice president (1964–1968) and acting president (1967, 1968).
- Leslie Illingworth, 77, Welsh political cartoonist.
- Wolfgang Metzger, 80, German psychologist.
- J. Arthur Moore, 88, Canadian politician.

=== 21 ===
- Mac Anderson, 60, New Zealand cricketer.
- Aulis Blomstedt, 73, Finnish architect.
- Robert L. Gerry Jr., 68, American polo player.
- Donald Gilmore, 84, American businessman and philanthropist.
- Michl Lang, 80, German actor.
- Arthur McDuffie, 33, American insurance salesman and police brutality victim, beaten.
- Ermindo Onega, 39, Argentine footballer, traffic collision.
- Nino Pavese, 75, Italian actor and dubber.
- Narahar Raghunath Phatak, 86, Indian historian and literary critic.
- Louis Leon Ribak, 77, Russian-born American painter.
- Nansi Richards, 91, Welsh harpist.
- Gaudencio Vera, 74, Filipino politician.
- Eric Joseph Wright, 67, Australian physician and public servant, coronary artery disease.

=== 22 ===
- Norberto S. Amoranto, 71, Filipino politician.
- Robert Angelle, 83, American politician, member of the Louisiana House of Representatives (1934–1964).
- Francisco Cavalcanti Pontes de Miranda, 87, Brazilian judge and diplomat, heart attack.
- Julie Morrow Deforest, 97, American painter.
- Friedrich, 7th Prince Fugger von Babenhausen, 65, German noble.
- George Pollock, 72, British film director.
- Claudia Ann Scott, 31, American poet and lesbian activist, suicide by carbon monoxide poisoning.
- Jane Dabney Shackelford, 84, American writer and educator.
- Bolesław Smólski, 57, Polish footballer.
- Richard Winston, 61–62, American translator.
- Darryl F. Zanuck, 77, American film producer and executive (20th Century Fox), pneumonia.

=== 23 ===
- F. E. Bromige, 77, British architect.
- Trevor Chadwick, 72, British humanitarian, stroke.
- Peggy Guggenheim, 81, American art collector and socialite.
- Anna Iwaszkiewicz, 82, Polish writer, translator and humanitarian.
- Cornelia Jones, 72, Saban politician.
- Dorothy Kunhardt, 78, American children's author (Pat the Bunny).
- Peter McKinney, 82, English footballer.
- Smiley Quick, 70, American golfer, heart attack.
- Ernest B. Schoedsack, 86, American filmmaker (King Kong).
- Dirk Stikker, 82, Dutch diplomat and politician, secretary general of NATO (1961–1964).

=== 24 ===
- Şadi Çalık, 61–62, Turkish sculptor.
- Renato Chiantoni, 73, Italian actor.
- Rudi Dutschke, 39, German political activist and sociologist, drowned.
- Francine Faure, 65, French pianist.
- John Huffman, 74, American Olympic fencer (1928, 1932, 1936).
- Leopold Macaulay, 92, Canadian politician.
- Frank Neale, 84, British-born Australian aviator.
- Vera Sandberg, 84, Swedish engineer.
- Tom Scott, 75, English footballer.
- José María Ucelay, 76, Spanish artist.
- William Houlder Zachariasen, 73, Norwegian-American physicist.

=== 25 ===
- Harold Ballin, 86, American football player and coach.
- Joan Blondell, 73, American actress (The Blue Veil, Opening Night, Grease), leukemia.
- Jordi Bonet, 47, Spanish-born Canadian artist, leukemia.
- Lee Bowman, 64, American actor, heart attack.
- Michael Collins, 57, English actor, cancer.
- Cecil Duncan, 86, Canadian ice hockey executive.
- Mario Filippeschi, 72, Italian singer.
- Thomas H. Hamilton, 65, American academic administrator.
- Mikhail Kazakov, 78, Soviet general.
- Frederick John Mitchell, 86, Canadian politician.
- Maurice Rieder, c. 82, Swiss Olympic rower (1928).
- Kenji Tomiki, 79, Japanese martial artist, colon cancer.

=== 26 ===
- Lev Arnshtam, 74, Soviet filmmaker.
- Edward Castle, Baron Castle, 72, British journalist and politician, MEP (since 1975), heart attack.
- John Coats, 73, Scottish theosophist.
- Helmut Hasse, 81, German mathematician.
- Karl Hubbuch, 88, German artist.
- Karl Manitius, 80, German historian.
- Sir Stephen McAdden, 72, British politician, MP (since 1950), complications from a fall.
- Hjalmar Mehr, 69, Swedish politician.
- Volmer Otzen, 80, Danish Olympic diver (1924).
- Hans-Georg Pflaum, 77, German-born French historian.
- John Savidge, 55, British Olympic track and field athlete (1952).
- Josiah Tongogara, 41, Zimbabwean soldier and politician, traffic collision.

=== 27 ===
- Miguel Alemán, 73, Cuban chess player.
- William D. Allen, 93, American football and basketball coach.
- Hafizullah Amin, 50, Afghan politician, head of state (since 1979), grenade explosion.
- Tom Darcy, 86, Australian politician.
- Sir Norman Denning, 75, British naval admiral, heart attack.
- Francesco Dezulian, 71, Italian Olympic skier (1932).
- Manish Ghatak, 77, Indian poet and novelist.
- James Earl Leverich, 88, American politician, member of the Wisconsin Senate (1935–1939, 1943–1967).
- Isaías Pleci, 72, Argentine chess player.
- Cesare Presca, 58, Italian footballer.
- William H. Wilbur, 91, American general.
- Mohammed Yakub, Afghan soldier, chief of general staff (since 1979), shot.

=== 28 ===
- Rafael Filiberto Bonnelly, 75, Dominican politician, president (1962–1963) and vice president (1960–1962), cancer.
- Hank Butcher, 93, American baseball player.
- John J. Cavanaugh, 80, American academic administrator and priest.
- Yosafat Fedoryk, 82, Ukrainian Greek Catholic prelate.
- Karl George, 85, American football player.
- Dommie Jayawardena, 52, Sri Lankan actor and singer.
- Jim Mosolf, 74, American baseball player.
- Dellora A. Norris, 77, American philanthropist.
- John Norton, 86, American track and field athlete (1920).
- Bengt Rosenius, 61, Swedish general.
- Hermann Schulte-Heuthaus, 81, German general.
- Sir Norman Tailyour, 65, British general.
- Percy Taylor, 60, Australian footballer.
- Johan Teng, 84, Estonian politician.
- Red Tramback, 64, American baseball player.
- Paul Wilwertz, 74, Luxembourgish politician.

=== 29 ===
- Ed Albrecht, 50, American baseball player.
- Felix Becker, 86, German soldier.
- Petras Ciunis, 81, Lithuanian soldier and educator.
- Bhupendra Kumar Datta, 87, Indian independence activist and politician.
- Manuel de la Sota, 82, Spanish football executive, politician and writer.
- Elka de Levie, 74, Dutch Olympic gymnast (1928).
- Étienne Dennery, 76, French diplomat.
- F. Edward Hébert, 78, American politician, member of the U.S. House of Representatives (1941–1977), heart failure.
- Manubhai Jodhani, 77, Indian writer and botanist.
- Lau Spel, 79, Dutch Olympic hurdler (1924, 1928).
- Richard Tecwyn Williams, 70, Welsh biochemist.

=== 30 ===
- Ben Bezoff, 65, American politician, member of the Colorado Senate (1951–1955) and House of Representatives (1947–1951), pancreatic cancer.
- Hirakushi Denchū, 107, Japanese sculptor.
- Anne Green, 88, American writer and translator.
- Cyclone Mackey, 76, American professional wrestler.
- Richard Rodgers, 77, American play composer (Oklahoma!, The Sound of Music, South Pacific).
- Paresh Lal Roy, 86, Indian boxer.
- Karel Skalička, 83, Czech-Argentine chess player.
- Yut Saeng-uthai, 71, Thai legal scholar.

=== 31 ===
- Charles Draper Faulkner, 89, American architect.
- Kurt Goldschmid, 60, Swiss Olympic field hockey player (1952).
- Sir Giles Guthrie, 63, English airline executive, brain cancer.
- Wolter Edward Hellén, 89, Finnish entomologist.
- Luis Induni, 59, Italian actor.
- Frederick John Knowles, 84, Scottish flying ace.
- Ernst Lehrs, 85, German writer and educator.
- Rex Mortimer, 53, Australian political scientist, cancer.
- Sergey Mostovoy, 71, Soviet soldier.
- Bankim Bihari Pal, 74, Indian politician and independence activist.
- John A. Powers, 57, American NASA public affairs official, intestinal bleeding.
- Harry Pownall, 77, American harness racer and horse trainer.
- Gian Singh Rarewala, 78, Indian politician.
- Robert Thom, 64, American illustrator.
- William Rae Tomlinson, 77, Canadian politician, MP (1935–1945).
