= Yut (disambiguation) =

Yut, or Yunnori, is a traditional Korean board game.

Yut or YUT may also refer to:

- Naujaat Airport, Canada, IATA airport code YUT
- Yopno language, ISO 639-3 language code yut
- Nikolai Yut, Chuvash writer, folklorist and literary critic
- Yut Angkinan (1936–2023), Thai politician
- Yut Saeng-uthai, Thai legal scholar
