= Ashok Agarwal =

Medical Scientist

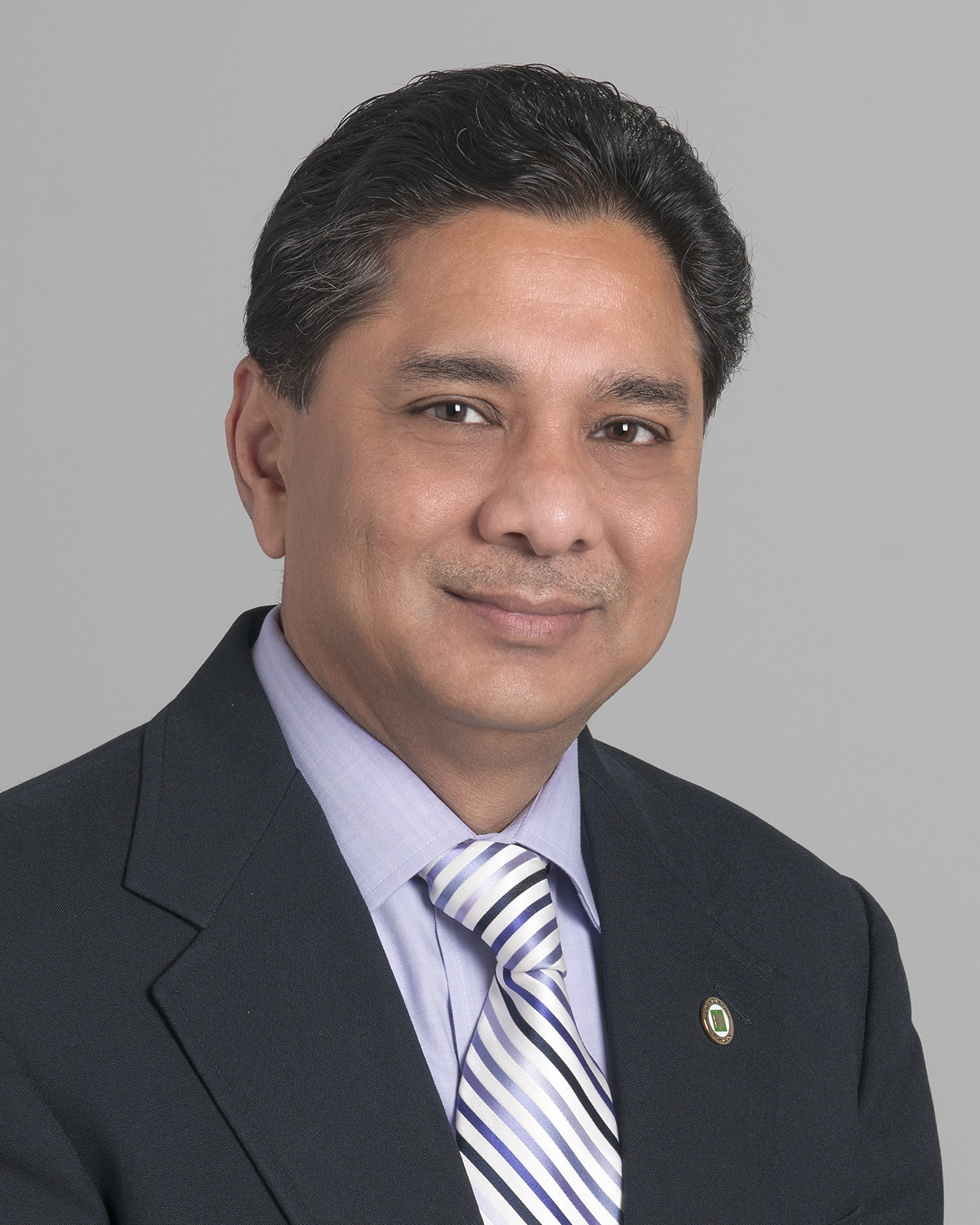
- Ashok Agarwal in 2013
- Born: Lucknow, India
- Education: 1965–68: Middle School, Mahanagar Boys High School (Lucknow, India); 1969–70: High School, Central Hindu School (Varanasi, India); 1971–72: Pre-University Course, Central Hindu School (Varanasi, India); 1972–75: BSc (Honors in Zoology), Banaras Hindu University (Varanasi, India); 1975–77: MSc, Specialization in Reproductive Physiology, Banaras Hindu University (Varanasi, India); 1977–83: PhD in Zoology, Specialization in Mammalian Reproductive Biology, Banaras Hindu University (Varanasi, India); 1984–86: Post-Doctoral Fellow (Rockefeller Foundation Fellowship in Reproductive Biology), Harvard Medical School (Boston, United States)
- Known for: Research Work in Human Reproductive Medicine
- Scientific career
- Fields: Medical Scientist, Researcher, Andrologist/Reproductive Biologist
- Doctoral advisor: C. J. Dominic, PhD (BHU, Cantab), FNA, Professor, Dept. of Zoology, Banaras Hindu University (Varanasi, India)
- Other academic advisors: Anita P. Hoffer, PhD, Ed.D., Associate Professor and Director of Research in Urology, Harvard Medical School, (Boston, United States) (Post-Doctoral Advisor)
- Website: https://www.globalandrologyforum.com/

Ashok Agarwal is the former director of the Andrology Center, and also the former Director of Research at the American Center for Reproductive Medicine at Cleveland Clinic, Cleveland, USA. He is a former Professor at the Cleveland Clinic Lerner College of Medicine of Case Western Reserve University, USA. Ashok is a former Senior Staff in the Cleveland Clinic's Glickman Urological and Kidney Institute. He has published extensive translational research in human infertility and assisted reproduction.

== Education ==
Ashok obtained his BSc (Honors) in 1975, MSc in 1977 and PhD in 1983 at Banaras Hindu University, Varanasi (India), under the guidance of Late C. J. Dominic, PhD, FNA. He did his post-doctoral research on a Rockefeller Foundation Fellowship at the Division of Urology, Harvard Medical School and the Brigham and Women's Hospital in Boston, Massachusetts (1984–1986), under the guidance of Anita P. Hoffer, PhD, Ed.D.

== Professional life ==
After his post-doctoral training at Harvard Medical School, Boston, Ashok worked as the Director of the Andrology Laboratory and Sperm Bank at the Newton-Wellesley Hospital, Boston (Medical Director: Robert A. Newton, M.D., F.A.C.S.) between 1986 and 1988. He was then appointed as the Director of Male Infertility Research and as an instructor in surgery and later an Assistant Professor of Urology at Harvard Medical School (Director of Urologic Research: Kevin R. Loughlin, M.D.) between 1988 and 1992. Aside from his teaching responsibilities, Ashok worked as the Coordinator of Andrology Testing in the Reproductive Endocrinology Laboratory in the Brigham and Women's Hospital (Medical Director: George L. Mutter, M.D.). Ashok was appointed in 1993 by the Cleveland Clinic Foundation, Ohio, as the Head of the Clinical Andrology Center, which over the years under his leadership, has become a center of excellence for the diagnosis of male infertility and for fertility preservation of men with oncological conditions in the United States.

Ashok is a board certified Clinical Laboratory Director (HCLD) in Andrology by the American Board of Bioanalysis and an Inspector for the College of American Pathologists "Reproductive Laboratory Program" for accreditation of Andrology and In Vitro Fertilization (IVF) Laboratories. He has served as the Chairman of Board of the American College of Embryology from 2009 to 2012.

He is the Director of the Summer Internship Course in Reproductive Medicine. In the last 13 years, over 320 pre-med and medical students from across the United States and overseas have graduated from the annual program.

Ashok is active in basic and clinical research and his laboratory has trained more than 525 basic scientists and clinical researchers from over 55 countries. His American Center for Reproductive Medicine has provided hands on training to 210 candidates in human assisted reproduction (Embryology and Andrology techniques) from 45 countries.

By the number of citations, he is the most cited author of several medicaljournals such as Fertility and Sterility, Urology, Reproductive Biomedicine Online, Andrologia, Reproductive Biology and Endocrinology. Ashok has been invited as a guest speaker to over 30 countries for important international meetings. He has directed more than a dozen Assisted Reproductive Technology (ART) and Andrology Laboratory Workshops and Symposia in recent years. He is a member of the International Advisory Committee on Male Infertility for the Society for Translational Medicine.

== Publications, editorship and reviewership ==
Ashok has published over 840 research articles and reviews in peer reviewed PubMed-indexed scientific journals. He has also authored over 225 book chapters in specialized medical books, and presented over 830 papers at both national and international scientific meetings. His Hirsch index (h-index) is 150 (Google Scholar) and 107 (Scopus), while his citation count is over 90,653 on Google Scholar. According to ResearchGate, Ashok has an RG Score of 54.37 on 2,193 publications (1245 articles, 54 books, 250 chapters, 486 conference papers). Ashok is ranked as the No. 1 Author in andrology/male Infertility and ART-related research, based on a Global Ranking of Authors Publishing in Andrology or Male Infertility report employing exhaustive searches on the Scopus database. Ashok is currently an editor of 42 medical text books or manuals related to male infertility, ART, fertility preservation, sperm chromatin damage and antioxidants. He is also the Guest Editor of 12 special journal issues and an ad hoc reviewer for over 50 scientific journals.

Ashok serves on the Editorial Board of Asian Journal of Andrology, Human Andrology, Human Fertility, International Brazilian Journal of Urology, International Journal of Fertility & Sterility, Reproductive BioMedicine Online, Reproductive Biology & Endocrinology, Translational Andrology and Urology, The World Journal of Men's Health, and International Journal of Molecular Sciences.

== Scientific career ==
Ashok is the recipient of over 100 research grants and is actively involved in laboratory and clinical studies looking at the efficacy of certain antioxidants in improving the fertility of male patients.

=== 1990–1999 ===
In the early years, Ashok and his team at ACRM studied the physiological levels of reactive oxygen species (ROS) and its relationship with sperm quality in healthy volunteers of unproven fertility and in infertile men. They went on to study the negative effects of oxidative stress generated during sperm processing and cryopreservation during ART procedures on semen quality. Ashok and his researchers looked into the cut-off values for ROS levels to distinguish between fertile and infertile men and the measurement of oxidative stress.

- Sharma, RK; Agarwal, A (1996). "Role of reactive oxygen species in male infertility". Urology. 48 (6): 835–50. doi:10.1016/s0090-4295(96)00313-5. PMID 8973665.
- Sharma, RK; Pasqualotto, FF; Nelson, DR; Thomas, AJ Jr.; Agarwal, A (1999). "The reactive oxygen species-total antioxidant capacity score is a new measure of oxidative stress to predict male infertility". Hum Reprod. 14 (11): 2801–7. doi:10.1093/humrep/14.11.2801. PMID 10548626.
- Hendin, BN; Kolettis, PN; Sharma, RK; Thomas, AJ Jr.; Agarwal, A (1999). "Varicocele is associated with elevated spermatozoal reactive oxygen species production and diminished seminal plasma antioxidant capacity". J Urol. 161 (6): 1831–4. doi:10.1016/S0022-5347(05)68818-0. PMID 10332447.
- Pasqualotto, FF; Sharma, RK; Nelson, DR; Thomas, AJ; Agarwal, A (2000). "Relationship between oxidative stress, semen characteristics, and clinical diagnosis in men undergoing infertility investigation". Fertil Steril. 73 (3): 459–64. doi:10.1016/s0015-0282(99)00567-1. PMID 10688996.

=== 2000-2009 ===
In the following decade, Ashok and his team at ACRM investigated the physiological and pathophysiological effects (both direct and indirect) of endogenous and exogenous ROS. Ashok and his researchers continued to examine normal range of ROS generation to distinguish between fertile and infertile men.

- Agarwal, A; Saleh, RA; Bedaiwy, MA (2003). "Role of reactive oxygen species in the pathophysiology of human reproduction". Fertil Steril. 79 (4): 829–43. doi:10.1016/s0015-0282(02)04948-8. PMID 12749418.
- Agarwal, A; Said, TM (2003). "Role of sperm chromatin abnormalities and DNA damage in male infertility". Hum Reprod Update. 9 (4): 331–45. doi:10.1093/humupd/dmg027. PMID 12926527.
- Saleh, RA; Agarwal, A; Nada, EA; El-Tonsy, MH; Sharma, RK; Meyer, A; Nelson, DR; Thomas, AJ (2003). "Negative effects of increased sperm DNA damage in relation to seminal oxidative stress in men with idiopathic and male factor infertility". Fertil Steril. 79 (Suppl 3): 1597–605. doi:10.1016/s0015-0282(03)00337-6. PMID 12801566.
- Wang, X; Sharma, RK; Sikka, SC; Thomas, AJ Jr.; Falcone, T; Agarwal, A (2003). "Oxidative stress is associated with increased apoptosis leading to spermatozoa DNA damage in patients with male factor infertility". Fertil Steril. 80 (3): 531–5. doi:10.1016/s0015-0282(03)00756-8. PMID 12969693.
- Moustafa, MH; Sharma, RK; Thornton, J; Mascha, E; Abdel-Hafez, MA; Thomas, AJ Jr.; Agarwal, A (2004). "Relationship between ROS production, apoptosis and DNA denaturation in spermatozoa from patients examined for infertility". Hum Reprod. 19 (1): 129–38. doi:10.1093/humrep/deh024. PMID 14688171.

=== 2010–2014 ===
In the new millennium, Ashok and his team at ACRM examined the role of antioxidants (e.g. carnitines, vitamins C and E, pentoxifyline) as defense mechanisms to neutralize and prevent the over-production of ROS in relation to male infertility.

- Agarwal, A; Sekhon, LH (2010). "The role of antioxidant therapy in the treatment of male infertility". Hum Fertil (Camb). 13 (4): 217–25. doi:10.3109/14647273.2010.532279. PMID 21117931. S2CID 31782420.
- Agarwal, A; Sekhon, LH (2011). "Oxidative stress and antioxidants for idiopathic oligoasthenoteratospermia: Is it justified?". Indian J Urol. 27 (1): 74–85. doi:10.4103/0970-1591.78437. PMC 3114591. PMID 21716893.
- Durairajanayagam, D; Agarwal, A; Ong, C; Prashast, P (2014). "Lycopene and male infertility". Asian J Androl. 16 (3): 420–5. doi:10.4103/1008-682X.126384. PMC 4023371. PMID 24675655.
- Agarwal, A; Durairajanayagam, D; Plessis, SS (2014). "Utility of antioxidants during assisted reproductive techniques: an evidence based review". Reprod Biol Endocrinol. 12: 112. doi:10.1186/1477-7827-12-112. PMC 4258799. PMID 25421286.

=== Current research ===
In the more recent years, Ashok has been working on the studies on molecular markers of oxidative stress, DNA integrity, effect of radio frequency radiation on fertility and fertility preservation in patients with cancer. His research focus currently is on the use of proteomics and bioinformatics tools in discovering the biological processes and pathways underlying OS-induced infertility.

- Agarwal, A; Desai, NR; Makker, K; et al. (October 2009). "Effects of radiofrequency electromagnetic waves (RF-EMW) from cellular phones on human ejaculated semen: an in vitro pilot study". Fertil. Steril. 92 (4): 1318–25. doi:10.1016/j.fertnstert.2008.08.022. PMID 18804757.
- Agarwal, A; Singh, A; Hamada, A; Kesari, K (2011). "Cell phones and male infertility: a review of recent innovations in technology and consequences". Int Braz J Urol. 37 (4): 432–54. doi:10.1590/s1677-55382011000400002. PMID 21888695.
- Agarwal, A; Durairajanayagam, D; Halabi, J; Peng, J; Vazquez-Levin, M (2014). "Proteomics, oxidative stress and male infertility". Reprod Biomed Online. 29 (1): 32–58. doi:10.1016/j.rbmo.2014.02.013. hdl:11336/6444. PMID 24813754.
- Sharma, R; Agarwal, A; Mohanty, G; Hamada, AJ; Gopalan, B; Willard, B; Yadav, S; Plessis, S (2013). "Proteomic analysis of human spermatozoa proteins with oxidative stress". Reprod Biol Endocrinol. 11 48. doi:10.1186/1477-7827-11-48. PMC 3716960. PMID 23688036.
- Samanta, L; Agarwal, A; Swain, N; Sharma, R; Gopalan, B; Esteves, SC; Durairajanayagam, D; Sabanegh, E (2018). "Proteomic Signatures of Sperm Mitochondria in Varicocele: Clinical Use as Biomarkers of Varicocele Associated Infertility". J Urol. 200 (2): 414–422. doi:10.1016/j.juro.2018.03.009. PMID 29530785. S2CID 3873797.

== Awards and honors ==
- 2007: SCSA Research Award, American Society for Reproductive Medicine
- 2008: CCF Innovation Award 2007 for "Supplementation of L Carnitine in the Culture Media Causes a Significant Decrease in DNA Damage and Improves Embryo Quality – A Novel Finding"
- 2011–2012: Innovator Award, Cleveland Clinic Innovations
- 2010–2019: Star Award, American Society for Reproductive Medicine
- 2011, 2013, 2014: Scholarship in Teaching Award, Case Western Reserve University Medical School for the Summer Internship Course in Reproductive Medicine,
- 2013, 2014: Scholarship in Teaching Award, Case Western Reserve University School of Medicine for the Training Program in Advanced Reproductive Techniques
- 2017: Outstanding Paper Award (along with his two collaborators from Hong Kong and Brazil), Asian Journal of Andrology
- 2018: Exceptional Research Productivity and Outstanding Research Collaboration, Hamad Medical Corporation, Doha, Qatar
- 2018: Outstanding Paper Award for Proteomic signatures of infertile men with clinical varicocele and their validation studies reveal mitochondrial dysfunction leading to infertility, Asian Journal of Andrology
- 2018: Outstanding Paper Award for Spermatozoa protein alterations in infertile men with bilateral varicocele, Asian Journal of Andrology
- 2019: IVF Expert of the Year, American College of Embryology
- 2019: Most Cited Article Award for Role of Antioxidants in Assisted Reproductive Techniques, World Journal of Men's Health
- 2020: Excellence in Online Education by Mexican Association of Reproductive Medicine and Arab School of Urology
- 2021: Excellence in Online Education by Royal College of Ob-Gyn in Egypt, the American College of Embryology, and French speaking Society of Andrology

=== Membership in professional societies (since) ===
- 1984 – American Society for Reproductive Medicine
- 1984 – American Society of Andrology
- 1993 – American Urological Association
- 1993 – Society for the Study of Male Reproduction
- 1994 – Asian Society of Andrology
- 1994 – European Society of Human Reproduction & Embryology
- 1994 – American Association of Bioanalysis
- 1996 – Society for Male Reproduction and Urology
- 2013 – Alpha Scientists in Reproductive Medicine

== Publications ==
A complete repository of Ashok's research publications (1991 – current) is available here. Ashok Agarwal's ORCID ID is https://orcid.org/0000-0003-0585-1026 and his Scopus Author ID is 7401480880. His ResearchGate profile is available here.

=== Selected scientific publications from Ashok Agarwal ===
- Agarwal, A; Saleh, RA; Bedaiwy, MA (2003). "Role of reactive oxygen species in the pathophysiology of human reproduction". Fertil Steril. 79 (4): 829–43. doi:10.1016/s0015-0282(02)04948-8. PMID 12749418.
- Agarwal, A; Gupta, S; Sharma, RK (2005). "Role of oxidative stress in female reproduction". Reprod. Biol. Endocrinol. 3 28. doi:10.1186/1477-7827-3-28. PMC 1215514. PMID 16018814.
- Agarwal, A; Makker, K; Sharma, R (2008). "Clinical relevance of oxidative stress in male factor infertility: an update". Am J Reprod Immunol. 59 (1): 2–11. doi:10.1111/j.1600-0897.2007.00559.x. PMID 18154591. S2CID 22911188.
- Agarwal, A; Deepinder, F; Sharma, RK; Ranga, G; Li, J (2008). "Effect of cell phone usage on semen analysis in men attending infertility clinic: an observational study". Fertil Steril. 89 (1): 124–8. doi:10.1016/j.fertnstert.2007.01.166. PMID 17482179.
- Agarwal, A; Gupta, S; Sikka, S (2006). "The role of free radicals and antioxidants in reproduction". Curr Opin Obstet Gynecol. 18 (3): 325–32. doi:10.1097/01.gco.0000193003.58158.4e. PMID 16735834. S2CID 19636449.
- Agarwal, A; Saleh, RA (2002). "Role of oxidants in male infertility: rationale, significance, and treatment". Urol Clin North Am. 29 (4): 817–27. doi:10.1016/S0094-0143(02)00081-2. PMID 12516754.
- Agarwal, A; Esteves, SC (2016). "Varicocele and male infertility: current concepts and future perspectives". Asian J Androl. 18 (2): 161–2. doi:10.4103/1008-682X.172819. PMC 4770479. PMID 26780875.
- Agarwal, A; Sharma, R; Durairajanayagam, D; Ayaz, A; Cui, Z; Willard, B; Gopalan, B; Sabanegh, E (2015). "Major protein alterations in spermatozoa from infertile men with unilateral varicocele". Reprod Biol Endocrinol. 13 8. doi:10.1186/s12958-015-0007-2. PMC 4383193. PMID 25890347.
- Agarwal, A; Sharma, R; Harlev, A; Esteves, SC (2016). "Effect of varicocele on semen characteristics according to the new 2010 World Health Organization criteria: a systematic review and meta-analysis". Asian J Androl. 18 (2): 163–70. doi:10.4103/1008-682X.172638. PMC 4770480. PMID 26780872.
- Agarwal, A; Majzoub, A; Esteves, SC; Ko, E; Ramasamy, R; Zini, A (2016). "Clinical utility of sperm DNA fragmentation testing: practice recommendations based on clinical scenarios". Transl Androl Urol. 5 (6): 935–950. doi:10.21037/tau.2016.10.03. PMC 5182232. PMID 28078226.

=== Books ===
==== Human Reproduction ====
1. Proteomics in Human Reproduction: Biomarkers for Millennials. Authors: Ashok Agarwal, Luna Samanta, Damayanthi Durairajanayagam, Paula Intasqui, 2016, ISBN 978-3-319-48416-7
2. Exercise and Human Reproduction: Induced Fertility Disorders and Possible Therapies. Editors: Diana Martin, Stefan Du Plessis, Ashok Agarwal, 2016, ISBN 978-1-4939-3402-7
3. Oxidative Stress in Human Reproduction: Shedding Light on a Complicated Phenomenon. Editors: Ashok Agarwal, Rakesh Sharma, Sajal Gupta, Avi Harlev, Gulfam Ahmad, Stefan S. du Plessis, Sandro C. Esteves, Siew May Wang, Damayanthi Durairajanayagam, 2017, ISBN 978-3-319-48425-9
4. Oxidants, Antioxidants, and Impact of the Oxidative Status in Male Reproduction. Editors: Ralf Henkel, Luna Samanta, Ashok Agarwal, 2018, ISBN 978-0-12-812501-4

==== Male Fertility ====
1. Studies on Men's Health and Fertility. Editors: Ashok Agarwal, John Aitken, Huan Alvarez, 2012, ISBN 978-1-61779-776-7
2. Male Infertility: A Complete Guide to Lifestyle and Environmental Factors. Editors: Stefan Du Plessis, Edmund S. Sabanegh, Ashok Agarwal, 2014, ISBN 978-1-4939-1040-3
3. Varicocele and Male Infertility: Current Concepts, Controversies and Consensus. Authors: Alaa Hamada, Sandro C. Esteves, Ashok Agarwal, 2016, ISBN 978-3-319-24934-6
4. Varicocele and Male Infertility: A Complete Guide. Authors: Sandro C. Esteves, Chak-Lam Cho, Ahmad Majzoub, Ashok Agarwal, 2019, ISBN 978-3-319-79102-9
5. Herbal Medicine in Andrology Authors: Ralf Henkel, Ashok Agarwal, 2021, ISBN 978-01-2815-566-0

==== Male Infertility – Management ====
1. Male Infertility: Contemporary Clinical Approaches, Andrology, ART and Antioxidants. Editors: Sijo Parekattil, Ashok Agarwal, 2012, ISBN 978-1-4614-3335-4
2. Medical and Surgical Management of Male Infertility. Editors: Botros Rizk, Nabil Aziz, Ashok Agarwal, Edmund Sabanegh, 2013, ISBN 978-9350259467
3. Understanding Male Infertility Global Practices and Indian Perspective. Editors: Sonia Malik, Ashok Agarwal, 2014, ISBN 978-8-1312-3264-4
4. Unexplained Infertility: Pathophysiology, Evaluation and Treatment. Editors: Glen Schattman, Sandro Esteves, Ashok Agarwal, 2015, ISBN 978-1-4939-2140-9
5. Male Infertility in Reproductive Medicine: Diagnosis and Management, 1st Edition. Editors: Botros Rizk, Ashok Agarwal, Edmund S. Sabanegh Jr., 2019, ISBN 9781138599291
6. Male Infertility: Contemporary Clinical Approaches, Andrology, ART and Antioxidants second edition. Editors: Sijo Parekattil, Sandro Estevas, Ashok Agarwal, 2020, ISBN 978-3-030-32302-8

==== Sperm Chromatin ====
1. Sperm Chromatin: Biological and Clinical Applications in Male Infertility and Assisted Reproduction. Editors: Armand Zini, Ashok Agarwal, 2011, ISBN 978-1-4419-6857-9
2. Sperm Chromatin for the Researcher: A Practical Guide. Editors: Armand Zini, Ashok Agarwal, 2013, ISBN 978-1-4614-8458-5

==== Female Fertility ====
1. Studies on Women's Health. Editors: Ashok Agarwal, Botros Rizk, Nabil Aziz, 2012, ISBN 978-1-62703-041-0
2. Endometriosis: A Comprehensive Update. Authors: Sajal Gupta, Avi Harlev, Ashok Agarwal, 2015, ISBN 978-3-319-18307-7
3. Puberty: Physiology and Abnormalities. Editors: Philip Kumanov and Ashok Agarwal, Springer Publishing, New York, 2016. ISBN 978-3-319-32122-6
4. Recurrent Pregnancy Loss: Evidence-Based Evaluation, Diagnosis and Treatment. Editors: Asher Bashiri, Avi Harlev, Ashok Agarwal, 2016, ISBN 978-3-319-27450-8

==== Fertility Preservation ====
1. Fertility Preservation: Emerging Technologies and Clinical Applications. Editors: Emre Seli, Ashok Agarwal, 2011, ISBN 978-1-4419-1783-6
2. Fertility Preservation in Females: Emerging Technology and Clinical Applications. Editors: Emre Seli, Ashok Agarwal, 2012, ISBN 978-1-4614-5616-2
3. Fertility Preservation in Males: Emerging Technology and Clinical Applications. Editors: Emre Seli, Ashok Agarwal, Springer, 2012, ISBN 978-1-4614-5619-3
4. The Complete Guide to Male Fertility Preservation. Editors: Ahmad Majzoub, Ashok Agarwal, 2018, ISBN 978-3-319-42396-8

==== Assisted Reproductive Techniques (ART) ====
1. Quality Management in ART Clinics. Editors: Fabíola Bento, Sandro Esteves, Ashok Agarwal, 2012, ISBN 978-1-4419-7139-5
2. Gamete Assessment, Selection and Micromanipulation in ART. Editors: Zsolt Peter Nagy, Alex Varghese, Ashok Agarwal, 2013, ISBN 978-1-4614-8359-5
3. Strategies to Ameliorate Oxidative Stress During Assisted Reproduction. Editors: Ashok Agarwal, Damayanthi Durairajanayagam, Gurpriya Virk, Stefan Du Plessis, 2015, ISBN 978-3-319-10259-7

==== ART Guides, Manuals, Methods and Protocols ====
1. Practical Manual of In Vitro Fertilization: Advanced Methods and Novel Devices. Editors: Zsolt Peter Nagy, Alex Varghese, Ashok Agarwal, 2012, ISBN 978-1-4419-1780-5
2. Clinical Embryology: A Practical Guide. Editors: Zsolt Peter Nagy, Alex Varghese, Ashok Agarwal, 2013, ISBN 978-1-4614-8375-5
3. Building and Managing an IVF Laboratory: A Practical Guide. Editors: Zsolt Peter Nagy, Alex Varghese, Ashok Agarwal, 2013, ISBN 978-1-4614-8365-6
4. Non-Invasive Sperm Selection for the In Vitro Fertilization: Novel Concepts and Methods. Editors: Ashok Agarwal, Edson Borges Jr., Amanda S. Setti, 2015, ISBN 978-1-4939-1411-1
5. Cryopreservation of Mammalian Gametes and Embryos: Methods and Protocols. Editors: Zsolt Peter Nagy, Alex C. Varghese, Ashok Agarwal, 2017, ISBN 978-1-4939-6828-2
6. In Vitro Fertilization: A Textbook of Current and Emerging Methods and Devices, Second Edition. Editors: Zsolt Peter Nagy, Alex Varghese, Ashok Agarwal, 2019, ISBN 978-3-319-43011-9

==== Andrology Laboratory Guides, Manuals and Workbooks ====
1. Andrology Laboratory Manual. Editors: Kaimini Rao, Ashok Agarwal, MS Srinivas, 2010, ISBN 978-81-8448-901-9
2. Workbook on Human Spermatozoa and Assisted Conceptions. Editors: Sonia Malik, Ashok Agarwal, 2012, ISBN 978-9-350-25517-9
3. Andrological Evaluation of Male Infertility: A Laboratory Guide. Editors: Agarwal A, Gupta S, Sharma R, 2016, ISBN 978-3-319-26797-5
4. Manual Sperm Retrieval and Preparation in Human Assisted Reproduction. Editors: Ashok Agarwal, Ahmad Majzoub, Sandro Esteves, 2021, ISBN 978-11-0879-215-8
5. Manual of Sperm Function Testing in Human Assisted Reproduction. Editors: Ashok Agarwal, Ralf Henkel, Ahmad Majzoub, 2021, ISBN 978-11-0887-871-5

==== Guides for Clinicians ====
1. Male Infertility for the Clinician: A Practical Guide. Editors: Sijo Parekattil, Ashok Agarwal, 2013, ISBN 978-1-4614-7851-5
2. Sperm Chromatin for the Clinician: A Practical Guide. Editors: Armand Zini, Ashok Agarwal, 2013, ISBN 978-1-4614-7842-3
3. Antioxidants in Male Infertility: A Guide for Clinicians and Researchers. Editors: Sijo Parekattil, Ashok Agarwal, 2013, ISBN 978-1-4614-9157-6
4. The Diagnosis and Treatment of Male Infertility: A Case-Based Guide for Clinicians. Editors: Nabil Aziz, Ashok Agarwal, 2017, ISBN 978-3-319-56545-3
5. A Clinician's Guide to Sperm DNA and Chromatin Damage. Editors: Armand Zini, Ashok Agarwal, 2018, ISBN 978-3-319-71815-6
6. Genetics of Male Infertility: A Case-Based Guide for Clinicians. Editors: Mohamed Arafa, Haitham Elbardisi, Ahmad Majzoub, Ashok Agarwal, 2020, ISBN 978-3-030-37972-8

=== Journal Special Issues (Guest Editor) ===
1. Hot Topics in Male Infertility: Panminerva Medica, Volume 61, Issue 2, June 2019
2. Hot Topics in Female Infertility: Panminerva Medica, Volume 61, Issue 1, March 2019
3. Updates in Male Factor Infertility: Arab Journal of Urology, Volume 16, Issue 1, March 2018.
4. Sperm DNA Fragmentation: Translational Andrology and Urology, Volume 6, Suppl 4, September 2017.
5. Varicocele and Male Infertility: Asian Journal of Andrology, Volume 18, Number 2, March 2016.
6. The Azoospermic Male: Current Knowledge and Future Perspectives: CLINICS, Volume 68, Number 1, February 2013.
7. Advances in Andrology and Male Reproductive Health: The Open Reproductive Science Journal, Volume 3, 2011.
8. Current Concepts in Assisted Reproduction and Fertility Preservation (Part II): Current Women's Health Reviews, Volume 6, Number 3, August 2010.
9. Current Concepts in Female Infertility Management (Part I): Current Women's Health Reviews, Volume 6, Number 2, May 2010.
10. Infertility: Archives of Medical Science, Volume 5 (1A), 2009.
11. An Update on Clinical Utility and Diagnostic Value of Various Andrological Techniques, Volume 53 (2), 2020.
12. An Update on Male Infertility: Factors, Mechanisms and Interventions, Volume 53 (1), 2020.
13. Men's Health, Volume 19 (3), 2021.
