= Victor Lucas =

Victor Lucas may refer to:

- Victor Lucas (television producer), Canadian television producer and personality
- Victor Lucas (footballer) (1907–1979), Australian rules footballer
