= Shanta S. Rao =

Indian scientist

- Born: 28 November 1923
- Died: 3 December 1979 (aged 56)
- Occupations: Scientist, medical researcher

Shanta S. Rao (28 November 1923 – 3 December 1979) was an Indian medical researcher.

== Early life ==
Rao graduated from Maharani College in Bangalore in 1943. She earned a master's degree from the University of Toronto in 1949, and completed doctoral studies in 1953, at Bombay University.

== Career ==
Rao's research started in the field of toxicology, studying proteolytic enzymes in the venom from various snake species. In 1956, she joined the Indian Cancer Research Center as a biochemist, and studied leprosy. Her field in later life was reproductive immunology; she studied human chorionic gonadotropin, and the presence of antigens in sperm as a cause for infertility.

Rao was a member of the faculty in pathology and pharmacology at Bombay University. In 1961, she was a founding executive board member of the Indian Society for the Study of Reproduction. From 1977 until her death, she was director of the Institute for Research on Reproduction, under the Indian Council of Medical Research. She worked with the United Nations Economic and Social Commission for Asia and the Pacific (ESCAP), and with the World Health Organization, serving on WHO's Committee on Immunological Aspects of Reproduction.

Rao's research was published in international academic journals including Endocrinology, Contraception, Andrologia, American Journal of Obstetrics and Gynecology, European Journal of Obstetrics and Gynecology, The Journal of Urology, Nature and Experientia. In 1960, she won the Shakuntala Devi Amirchand Prize in 1960. In 1963, she was one of the four Indian scientists to win the G. J. Watumull Memorial Prize, for her work in family planning. In 1965, she won a grant from the Rockefeller Foundation to visit reproductive physiology laboratories in Europe and Israel. In 1971, she won Bulgaria's Metchnikoff Medal.

== Personal life and legacy ==
Rao died in 1979, aged 56 years, from leukemia. There is a Shanta S. Rao Award given in her memory by the National Institute of Research in Reproductive Health. There is also a Dr. Shanta S. Rao Memorial Girls Hostel near the Institute for Research in Reproduction in Mumbai and in the year 2020 a auditorium was inaugurated by ICMR-NIRRCH Mumbai, is named after her.
