= Jean Hamilton =

Jean Hamilton may refer to:

- Jean Redcliffe-Maud (née Hamilton; 1904–1993), British pianist
- Jean Constance Hamilton (born 1945), United States District Judge
- Jean Barbara Hamilton (born 1898), daughter of Lord Ernest Hamilton

== See also ==
- Jean Hamilton Walls (1885–1978), first African American women to enroll at the University of Pittsburgh
