= Koford =

Koford is a surname. Notable people with the surname include:

- Carl B. Koford (1915–1979), American biologist
- Helen Koford (born 1929), American actress
- Jill Koford, American politician

== See also ==
- Koforidua
