= Senator Nicholas =

Senator Nicholas may refer to:

== Members of the United States Senate ==
- Robert C. Nicholas (1787–1856), U.S. Senator from Louisiana from 1836 to 1841
- Wilson Cary Nicholas (1761–1820), U.S. Senator from Virginia from 1799 to 1804

== United States state senate members ==
- David R. Nicholas (1941–2005), Wyoming State Senate
- John Nicholas (congressman) (1764–1819), New York State Senate
- Phil Nicholas (born 1955), Wyoming State Senate
- Robert C. Nicholas (New York politician) (1801–1854), New York State Senate

== See also ==
- Michael San Nicolas (born 1981), Senate of Guam
- Senator Nichols (disambiguation)
