= Senator Hitchcock =

Senator Hitchcock may refer to:

== Members of the United States Senate ==
- Gilbert Hitchcock (1859–1934), U.S. Senator from Nebraska from 1911 to 1923
- Herbert E. Hitchcock (1867–1958), U.S. Senator from South Dakota from 1936 to 1938
- Phineas Hitchcock (1831–1881), U.S. Senator from Nebraska from 1871 to 1877

== United States state senate members ==
- David N. Hitchcock (1918–1979), Wyoming State Senate
- Peter Hitchcock (1781–1853), Ohio State Senate
- Simon C. Hitchcock (c. 1801–1878), New York State Senate
- Zina Hitchcock (1755–1832), New York State Senate
