= Senator Nichols =

Senator Nichols may refer to:

- Andy Nichols (1937–2001), Arizona State Senate
- Asher P. Nichols (1815–1880), New York State Senate
- Bill Nichols (politician) (1918–1988), Alabama State Senate
- George S. Nichols (1820–1916), New York State Senate
- Haskell L. Nichols (1896–1991), Michigan State Senate
- Hugh L. Nichols (1865–1942), Ohio State Senate
- James W. Nichols (born 1946), Minnesota State Senate
- John A. Nichols (1848–1924), New York State Senate
- Jonathan Nichols (Oklahoma politician) (1965–2019), Oklahoma State Senate
- Malcolm Nichols (1876–1950), Massachusetts State Senate
- Ralph Nichols (American football) (1874–1949), Washington State Senate
- Robert Nichols (politician) (born 1944), Texas State Senate
- Tammy Nichols (born 1976), Idaho State Senate
- William T. Nichols (1829–1882), Vermont State Senate

== See also ==
- John C. Nicholls (1834–1893), Georgia State Senate
- William E. Nichol (1918–2006), Nebraska State Senate
- Courtlandt Nicoll (1880–1938), New York State Senate
- Senator Nicholas (disambiguation)
