= Beautiful but Broke =

1944 film

- Directed by: Charles Barton
- Screenplay by: Monte Brice
- Story by: Arthur Housman; Manuel Seff (adaptation)
- Produced by: Irving Briskin
- Starring: Joan Davis; Jane Frazee; John Hubbard
- Cinematography: L. William O'Connell
- Edited by: Richard Fantl
- Music by: John Leipold
- Distributed by: Columbia Pictures
- Release date: January 28, 1944
- Running time: 74 minutes
- Country: United States
- Language: English

Beautiful but Broke (1944) is an American musical-comedy film starring Joan Davis and Jane Frazee.

== Plot ==
Business is so bad at the Waldo Main theatrical agency that the owner gives it to his secretary, Dottie Duncan, and joins the Marines. Dottie enlists two office neighbors, Sally and Sue, to help her put over a big contract. Dottie recruits a local all-girl band to play an out-of-town date, but the railroad surrenders their seats to military personnel. Dottie can't find her purse containing the tickets, so the group is stranded in a small town.

The band makes good anyway, working at a daycare center while mothers are doing war work, and playing concerts at wartime charity events. Dottie learns that Bill Drake, who has been arranging these local activities, had Dottie's purse all the time and was keeping the railroad tickets so the band wouldn't move on.

== Cast ==
- Joan Davis as Dottie Duncan
- Jane Frazee as Sally Richards
- Judy Clark as Sue Ford
- John Hubbard as Bill Drake
- Bob Haymes as Jack Foster
- The Brian Sisters as singing trio
- John Eldredge as Waldo Main
- Byron Foulger as Maxwell McKay
- Grace Hayle as Birdie Benson
- George McKay as railroad stationmaster
- Danny Mummert as Rollo
- Willie, West and McGinty as carpenters
- Ferris Taylor as mayor

== See also ==
- List of American films of 1944
