= Koford's grass mouse =

Conservation status
- Least Concern (IUCN 3.1)

Scientific classification
- Kingdom: Animalia
- Phylum: Chordata
- Class: Mammalia
- Order: Rodentia
- Family: Cricetidae
- Subfamily: Sigmodontinae
- Genus: Akodon
- Species: A. kofordi

Binomial name
- Akodon kofordi Myers & Patton, 1989

Species of rodent

Koford's grass mouse (Akodon kofordi) is a species of rodent in the family Cricetidae. It is found only in Peru. It is named after American biologist Carl B. Koford.
