= Richard Schubert =

German politician (KPD)

Richard Schubert (1 July 1886 – 24 December 1955) was a German political activist who by the end of the First World War had become a peace activist. He joined the anti-war Independent Social Democratic Party when it was launched in 1917 and switched to the Communist Party soon after its establishment. He played a leading part in the turmoil in Zwickau during the months of revolution in the ports and cities that followed the war, and was a leading figure locally in the communist parties during the politically fractious 1920s. In 1931 he became a member of the Saxon state parliament (Landtag), but his political career was cut short by the change of government and abolition of democracy during 1933.

== Life ==
Richard Schubert was born at Mülsen St. Jacob, outside Zwickau in Saxony. His father worked as a linen weaver. He trained for work as a weaver and worked in a succession of businesses in the textiles sector. In 1903 he became a member of the Social Democratic Party (Sozialdemokratische Partei Deutschlands / SPD).

He was excluded from conscription during the First World War on health grounds. The 1914 decision of the party's parliamentary leadership in to vote in favour of war funding had been contentious from the outset, and anti-war sentiment among the party membership was intensified by the extent of the slaughter on the frontline and the acute economic hardship on the home front. In 1917 the party broke apart over the issue, and Schubert was part of the substantial breakaway minority that formed the anti-war Independent Social Democratic Party. Directly after the war ended in military defeat, triggered by the Kiel mutiny and inspired by the so-called "October Revolution", revolution spread quickly across Germany during November 1918. In Zwickau Schubert assumed a leadership role in the workers' and soldiers' soviet which fought for power locally between November 1918 and January 1919. During January 1919 he was a co-founder of the Zwickau Spartacus League, and by the middle of January 1919 had emerged as the (first) chairman of the Zwickau Communist Party.

During the attempted Kapp Putsch against the republic in March 1920, Schubert served as chairman of the Zwickau Action Committee. He was one of those profoundly disappointed by the reaction to the Putsch of the Party leadership in Berlin (which was the fulcrum of the uprising). The solution, for Schubert and his comrades, was to form the Communist Workers' Party (Kommunistische Arbeiter-Partei Deutschlands / KAPD), a breakaway Communist Party committed to an immediate abolition of bourgeois democracy and the construction of a dictatorship of the proletariat (although they decided against a one-party Soviet-style dictatorship). Schubert became leader of the KAPD for Zwickau and the surrounding area. By 1924, despite economic crises and continuing widespread destitution, bourgeois democracy was still, by most criteria, in place; but the former leadership of the Communist Party had been unceremoniously removed. Although the party's future path was still unclear, the direction of its political travel was evidently reassuring to Richard Schubert, who rejoined the party in 1924. Later that year he was elected to membership of the Zwickau city council. He very quickly emerged as the leader of the Communist Party group on the council. During this time Schubert supported himself, initially, as a municipal worker. He later switched to a Consumers' co-operative business, at which he worked as a baker of cakes and pastries.

Reflecting his continuing high-profile within the party, on 31 February 1931 he accepted nomination for a seat in the State Parliament (Landtag) in Dresden, taking the seat that had been vacated through the resignation, for reasons of ill-health, of his party comrade, Margarete Nischwitz.

After the Hitler government took power in January 1933, Schubert tried to continue exercising his parliamentary. (It would be several months before the National Socialists completed the transformation of Germany into a one-party dictatorship.) Schubert therefore made a declaration to the Presidium of the parliament in March 1933 that in future he wished to exercise his parliamentary duties as a non-party member. That was incompatible with the intentions of the new government in Berlin, however. Instead, Richard Schubert was taken into protective custody. It is known that he was held in Osterstein Castle which was being used as an ad hoc concentration camp. Little is known about what happened during his period of incarceration, but after his release in December 1933 he avoided further political involvement, instead devoting his energies to helping his wife in her flower shop. He remained under close surveillance by the security services till 1939.
