= Laffing Room Only =

1944 Broadway vaudeville revue

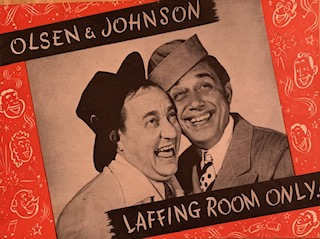
- Souvenir Program (cover)
- Music: Burton Lane
- Lyrics: Burton Lane

Laffing Room Only is a vaudeville revue in two acts by Ole Olsen, Chic Johnson, and Eugene Conrad, with music and lyrics by Burton Lane. This was the first show for which Burton Lane wrote both the words and the music. It was produced by the Shuberts (Lee and J.J.), Olsen, and Johnson at the Winter Garden Theatre, New York City, opening December 23, 1944. Laffing Room Only was staged by John Murray Anderson, with comedy directed by Edward F. Cline, music directed by John McManus, dances by Robert Alton, settings by Stewart Chaney, and costumes by Billy Livingston. The production was supervised by Harry Kaufman. It ran for 232 performances, closing on July 14, 1945.

In addition to Olsen and Johnson, the cast of 44 headlined Frank Libuse, Betty Garrett, and Willie, West and McGinty, and included Ethel Owen, Herbert Ross, and Fred Waring's Glee Club.

== Songs ==
- “Hooray for Anywhere”
- “The Ghost Train”
- “Go Down to Boston Harbor” (Betty Garrett)
- “Fussin’, Feudin’ and Fightin’”
- “This Is As Far As I Go” (Betty Garrett, Herbert Ross)
- “An Apartment in 1980”
- “In a Radio Station”
- “The Hellzapoppin Polka”
- “The Piano Movers”
- “Sunny California” (Betty Garrett)
- “The Steps of the Capitol” (Betty Garrett)
- “Pocatello, Idaho”
- “Got That Good Time Feelin’”
