= Mexican grizzly bear =

- Diorama featuring Mexican grizzly bears at the Field Museum of Natural History in Chicago, Illinois, USA

Conservation status
- Extinct (1976) (IUCN 2.3)

Scientific classification
- Kingdom: Animalia
- Phylum: Chordata
- Class: Mammalia
- Order: Carnivora
- Family: Ursidae
- Genus: Ursus
- Species: U. arctos
- Subspecies: U. a. horribilis
- Population: †Mexican grizzly bear

Synonyms
- Ursus arctos nelsoni

Extinct population of the brown bear

The Mexican grizzly bear (Ursus arctos horribilis, formerly Ursus arctos nelsoni) is an extinct population of the grizzly bear in the Southwestern United States and Mexico.

The specimen later designated the holotype of U. a. nelsoni was shot by H. A. Cluff at Colonia Garcia, Chihuahua, in 1899. The extinct California grizzly bear extended slightly south into Baja California. The bears in Durango, Chihuahua, Sonora and central Mexico were likely more related to the bears of Arizona, New Mexico and Texas than to those of California.

== Description ==
Known in the Opatas language as the pissini, the grizzly was one of the heaviest and largest mammals in Mexico. It reached a length up to 1.82 m (6 ft 0 in) and an average weight of 318 kilograms (701 lb). Due to its silver fur, it was often named in Spanish as el oso plateado (the silvery bear). This bear was also described to have been of a dark color and only rarely with a reddish coat. The Mexican grizzly was smaller than the grizzlies in the United States and Canada. The general color was pale buffy yellow varying to grayish-white, grizzled from the darker color of the underfur. Specimens in worn pelage varied to yellowish-brown and reddish. The longest fur hairs were on the throat and the flanks. The belly was sparsely haired, lacking the thick underfur of the back and the flanks.

== Range and habitat ==
The bear inhabited the northern territories of Mexico, in particular the temperate grasslands and mountainous pine forests. Its previous range reached from across Aridoamerica, from Arizona to New Mexico, Texas and Mexico. It seems unlikely that the bears would have gone into torpor, although they may have spent some time in winter dens.

== Biology ==
Like all brown bears, Mexican grizzlies were omnivores. Their diet mainly consisted of plants, fruits and insects, and it is reported that it was very fond of ants, like most brown bears. Occasionally it fed also on small mammals and carrion. Females produced one to three cubs every three years or so. This bear is within mitochondrial DNA (mtDNA) Clade 4, as are all of the extant North American brown bears.

When in small populations, especially with bears, they can lose their genetic variability and affect the genetic drift of bears. This can cause the loss of generations getting passed down with similar characteristics, Overall, this can make it challenging for population's to familiarize and adapt to the environmental changes that have took place. This idea supports why smaller population's can become more vulnerable, but doesn't necessarily prove that genetics were the leading cause of the extinction of Mexican grizzly bears.

== Extinction ==
The first Europeans to come in contact with the Mexican grizzly were the conquistadors in the 16th century, when Francisco Vásquez de Coronado went on an expedition to find the Seven Cities of Gold. His expedition began in Mexico City in 1540, and went north to New Mexico and the Great Plains in the modern-day U.S. states of Texas and Kansas. Because the bears hunted cattle from time to time, they were considered as pests by farmers. Grizzlies were trapped, shot and poisoned, and had already become scarce by the 1930s. Its former range decreased to the three isolated mountains, Cerro Campana, Cerro Santa Clara, and Sierra del Nido 80 km (50 miles) north of Chihuahua City, within the State of Chihuahua. By 1960, only 30 individuals were said to remain. Despite its protected status, the hunting continued. By 1964, the Mexican grizzly was regarded as being extinct. After rumours of some surviving individuals on a ranch at the headwaters of the Yaqui River in the state of Sonora in 1968, American biologist Dr. Carl B. Koford went on a three-month survey but without success. A grizzly was shot in 1976 in Sonora, the fourth confirmed in Sonora, and the first in many decades. The Mexican grizzly is now presumed to be extinct, or perhaps only extirpated.

Chihuahua City

The changes to the Sierra del Nido and the drought played an important factor on the Mexican grizzly's extinction. When the land was transforming in the 1950's, the area was cut into smaller ranches, making the Mexican grizzly bears lives at danger due to the fact that it was easier for hunters to attack the bear habitat. From the drought that happened in 1949 and 1962, this reduced food and water, leaving barely any resource's for the bears to survive. Even some of the bears started relying on the cattle because that was all there was left. Rancher's set up around 1,080 poison stations and estimates that the last Mexican grizzly was killed between 1960 and 1962.

The cause of extinction and disappearance of the Mexican Grizzly bear is rooted from colonization of people moving into the areas of the bears, and then hunting them. More and more people started taking over the land, so they would have livestock, but that created an issue due to the grizzly bear population. Brown (1996) explains how over times, the grizzly bears population declined and disappeared in parts of Mexico and of the Southwest. The remaining bears tended to be found in isolated mountain areas, as the number of them left were small.

It wasn't just Mexico having a disappearance of grizzly bears, it was also the United States. There was a study done where they figured out why these grizzly bears are disappearing all over America. The results showed that the human population affected the number of grizzly bears found due to less habitat available to live on.

== Possible Grizzly Bears In Mexico ==
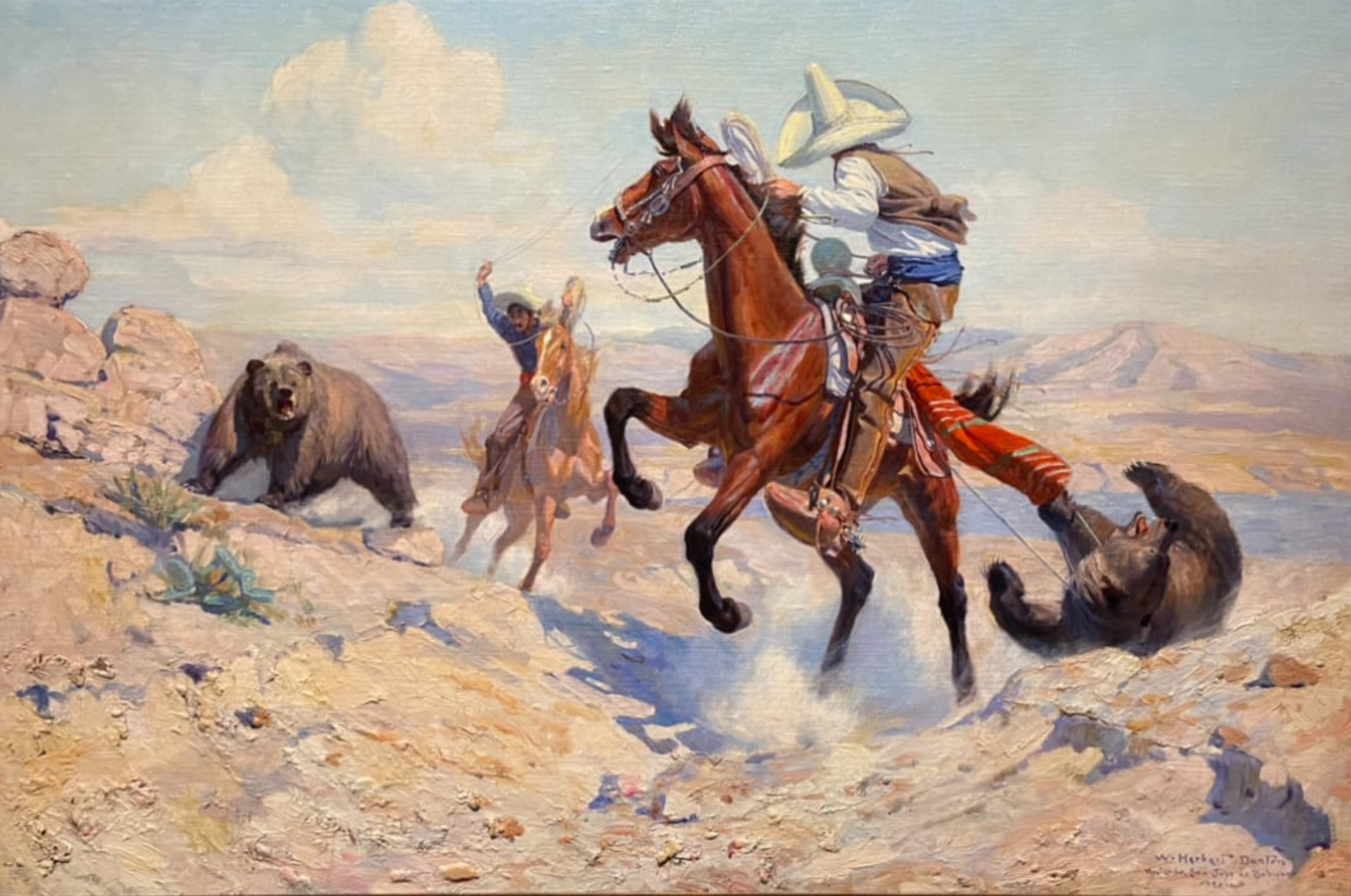
Vaqueros Roping Grizzly Bears

After the Mexican grizzly was considered extinct, reports continued to suggest that some might remain in Mexico. In 1986, Trevino and Jonkel investigated these reports in the Sierra del Nido region of Chihuahua. They found large tracks and claw marks that might have belonged to the grizzles, and observed a large bear they considered could be one. The tests showed that the hair they collected came from black bears, so they couldn't confirm that Mexican grizzles still lived in Mexico. They wanted to have further research to explore more areas and confirm or deny that they were still alive.
