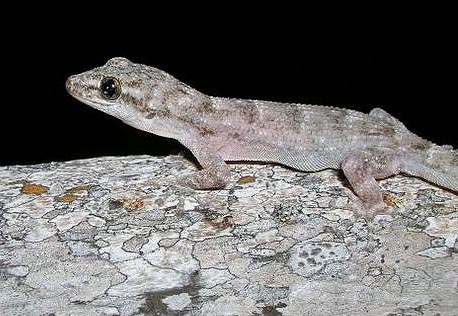

Conservation status
- Least Concern (IUCN 3.1)

Scientific classification
- Kingdom: Animalia
- Phylum: Chordata
- Class: Reptilia
- Order: Squamata
- Suborder: Gekkota
- Family: Phyllodactylidae
- Genus: Phyllodactylus
- Species: P. kofordi

Binomial name
- Phyllodactylus kofordi Dixon & Huey, 1970

= Coastal leaf-toed gecko =

Species of lizard

The coastal leaf-toed gecko (Phyllodacylus kofordi), also known commonly as the Tumbesian leaf-toed gecko is a species of lizard in the family Phyllodactylidae. The species is endemic to South America.

== Taxonomy ==
P. kofordi was described as a species new to science by James R. Dixon and Raymond B. Huey in 1970.

== Etymology ==
The specific name, kofordi, is in honor of American zoologist Carl B. Koford.

== Description ==
P. kofordi is a small gecko with a maximum snout-to-vent length (SVL) of 46 mm (1.8 in).

== Geographic range ==
P. kofordi is found in Peru and southern Ecuador.

The type locality of this gecko is the Cerro La Vieja in the Peruvian Region of Lambayeque.

== Habitat ==
The preferred natural habitats of P. kofordi are desert and dry forest, at altitudes from sea level to 638 m (2,093 ft).

== Behavior ==
P. kofordi is terrestrial and nocturnal.

== Diet ==
P. kofordi preys upon invertebrates, and it also eats plant material.

== Reproduction ==
P. kofordi is oviparous.
