= David N. Hitchcock =

American politician (1918–1979)

Minority Leader of the Wyoming Senate
- In office January 14, 1975 – January 11, 1977
- Succeeded by: Robert H. Johnson

Member of the Wyoming Senate from the Albany County district
- In office 1967–1979
- Succeeded by: David R. Nicholas
- In office 1951–1955

Personal details
- Born: June 2, 1918 Laramie, Wyoming, U.S.
- Died: December 15, 1979 (aged 61) Laramie, Wyoming, U.S.
- Cause of death: Suicide by gunshot
- Party: Democratic
- Spouse(s): Charolette; Wanda
- Children: 4
- Education: University of Wyoming
- Profession: Politician, lawyer

David N. Hitchcock (June 2, 1918 – December 15, 1979) was an American politician and lawyer who represented Albany County as a Democrat in the Wyoming Senate. He served from 1951 to 1955, and again from 1967 to 1979. Hitchcock served as Senate Minority Leader in the 43rd Wyoming Legislature.

== Early life and education ==
Hitchcock was born in Laramie, Wyoming, on June 2, 1918. He graduated from high school in 1935 and obtained bachelor and law degrees from the University of Wyoming.

== Career ==
Hitchcock represented Albany County as a Democrat in the Wyoming Senate from 1951 to 1955, and again from 1967 to 1979. He also served as Senate Minority Leader from 1975 to 1977 in the 43rd Wyoming Legislature. (Note: According to Wyoming Legislature, Hitchock served from 1951 to 1953 and from 1967 to 1978, serving as Senate Minority Leader from 1975 to 1976.)

Hitchcock served a total of four terms in the Wyoming Senate. During his time in office, Hitchcock served on the following committees.

- Travel and Recreation (1967)
- Industrial Development and Water Resources (1967, 1969)
- Revenue (1969, 1971)
- Corporations, Elections and Political Subdivisions (1971, 1973–1978)
- Rules and Procedures (1975–1976)
- Education, Health and Welfare (1975–1978)

Outside of the Wyoming Legislature, Hitchcock was an attorney who practiced in Laramie. In 1978, Hitchcock announced that he would not seek re-election to the Wyoming Senate, citing "a heavy load in his law practice".

== Personal life and death ==
Hitchcock married twice and had four children. His second wife, Wanda, ran for Hitchcock's seat in 1978, though she was defeated by Republican David R. Nicholas.

Hitchcock died at the age of 61 in Laramie, Wyoming; he is believed to have shot himself in the head on the night of December 15, 1979. His body was discovered the following morning on the lawn of the Albany County Courthouse. Hitchcock's vehicle was located a block away by a police station.

== Notes ==
Wyoming Senate
Preceded by —	Member of the Wyoming Senate from the Albany County district 1951–1955, 1967–1979	Succeeded by David R. Nicholas
Wyoming Senate
Preceded by —	Minority Leader of the Wyoming Senate; 1975–1977	Succeeded by Robert H. Johnson
