= Paul B. Wishart =

American businessman (1898–1979)

- Born: September 25, 1898; Kirkwood, Missouri
- Died: December 7, 1979 (aged 81); Ponte Vedra Beach, Florida
- Education: United States Naval Academy (BSc '20)
- Spouse: Eleanor Preston Kirkman (m. 1930)
- Military career
- Branch: United States Navy
- Service years: 1917–23

Paul Barclay Wishart (September 25, 1898 – December 7, 1979) was an American executive who served as the chairperson of Honeywell.

== Biography ==
Wishart graduated from the United States Naval Academy and joined Honeywell in 1942, initially working as the superintendent of manufacturing. During his early years at the company, Honeywell expanded its involvement in the development of defense products.

In 1961, Wishart became the chairman and chief executive officer of the Minneapolis-Honeywell Regulator Company. Under his leadership, the company underwent a transformation, diversifying its operations and changing its name to Honeywell. During Wishart's tenure, Honeywell's revenue increased from $200 million to over $400 million, and profits grew from $10 million to $26 million.

Wishart retired from his position at Honeywell in 1965.
