= Joe Schertzl =

Ice Hockey player

- Born: August 24, 1923 Budapest, Hungary
- Died: December 2, 1979 (aged 56) Ontario, Canada
- Height: 5 ft 11 in (180 cm)
- Weight: 200 lb (91 kg; 14 st 4 lb)
- Position: Defense
- Shot: Right
- Played for: Hershey Bears
- Playing career: 1941–1957

Joseph Schertzl (August 24, 1923 – December 2, 1979) was a Canadian professional ice hockey player who played 243 games for the Hershey Bears in the American Hockey League.
