= Manoel de Castro Villas Bôas =

Brazilian entrepreneur, writer, and journalist

Manoel de Castro Villas Bôas (18 April 1907 – 13 December 1979) was a Brazilian entrepreneur, writer and journalist that contributed in bridge the gap between Brazil and Brazilians, via actions and articles published in several Brazilian newspapers and magazines on political and economical matters. He also was a pioneer in creating and developing in the Brazilian press the concept of a Newspaper supplement, delivering to the reader special editions on a comprehensive format and reading style easily understood in a number of political, economical and historical facts.

== Early life ==
Native of São Paulo, he was born from Hyphatia de Azevedo Barbosa's marriage to Horacio de Castro Villas Bôas, on 20 December 1902, in São Paulo. Horacio, born in Angra dos Reis, State of Rio de Janeiro, a beloved son of Manoel de Villas Bôas, Portuguese born, and Maria Joana de Castro, from Angra, was one of the first telegraphists in the country and was transferred from Angra to São Paulo both to train new telegraphists as well head the telegraph services in that city. Soon after Manoel's birth in 1907, Hyphatia died and one year later, in 1908, Horacio, leaving not only Manoel, as a baby, but also his two sisters, Conceição and Fausta, under the care of his grandfather Manoel de Azevedo Barbosa and grandmother Maria Teixeira das Neves and his preferred aunt Carolina. He studied at the Instituto Mackenzie and Escola de Commercio Alvares Penteado, both in São Paulo, and started working quite early in life, at the age of 15 to 16, as it was common in those days, at a manufacturing plant that belonged to his uncle, Teixeira das Neves.

== Self made career ==
Soon he realized that working in a manufacturing industry, even if one belonging to his uncle, would not lead him to the kind of self enlightening and adventurous life he always pursued until the end of his lifetime. He then quit both his job and school, at age 17, and started a new life selling framed pictures all over Brazil and Uruguay. This gave him an excellent opportunity to start knowing the Brazilian hinterland, its realities and myths. At the age 19, 1926, he met Menotti Del Picchia and Pedro Ferraz do Amaral, lifelong friends and co-founders of the seminal "Semana de Arte Moderna" cultural movement, allowing him to take part in some of the late manifestations of that movement, while traveling through the country.

In 1931, while still in São Paulo, he had begun his entrepreneurship life investing in a Bugatti racing car in partnership with a friend, the pilot, to race in Brazil and hopefully to collect cash-awards. Unfortunately, however, the car got smashed during a "drive trial", when himself and the pilot were testing the car. All that was left was a broken nose and an aversion to possessing and driving cars, which he carried throughout his life.

At age 25, in 1932, he settled in Belém, state of Pará, in the Brazilian Amazon, where he was a prosperous entrepreneur, founder and director of "Corporação Latino Americana de Artes" that financed and promoted state industrial and fine art fair and events. However, in 1934, Typhus, quite endemic in the amazon region at that time, forced him to seek for treatment in São Paulo.

== Political career ==
Back in São Paulo, he was invited by Pedro Ferraz do Amaral, then editor-in-chief of the prestigious Correio de São Paulo to join it as special editor, covering the news within the State of São Paulo, which was by then emerging as Brazil's main economic powerhouse. Accepting it, and vested in that power, he then traveled 33 villages and towns within the State, visiting several counties and jurisdictions, interviewing their politicians, civil societies and even some of their founders, getting to know all kinds of new realities and facts in a time where the Brazilian political life was emerging from the lethargy of the Old Republic (1889–1930).

On account of that, he was invited by Armando Salles de Oliveira to join the Partido Constitucionalista, the new reformist and democratic party, led by Salles de Oliveira, which proposed a new Brazilian Constitution founded on solid democratic principles and opposed to the autocratic political regimen imposed by the corruption of the ideals of the "Revolução de 30", a revolution that took place in 1930. Villas Bôas' political adventures, however, did not take him quite further away since in 1935 a coup d'etat, so-called Estado Novo conducted Getúlio Vargas, as Dictator, into power, thus deceiving the aspirations and constitutional claims of the Partido Cosntitucionalista.

== Journalist ==
Notwithstanding, his career as a journalist had been launched and he never quit it, although, his notorious taste for new horizons and challenges had directed him, here and there, to other areas of activities, as a real pioneer, a desbravador of the Brazilian hinterland.

In 1935 at the age 28 he married Jenny Ida Maria Cerrini, 22 (27/01/1913, Pisa, Italy - 1994, São Paulo, Brazil), and started his own family in the city of São Paulo. From this marriage, three were the offspring, Maria Helena, born in 1936, Maria Lucia, born in 1938, and Roberto, born in 1943.

In December 1936 he published Pedaços de São Paulo ("Pieces of São Paulo") a book covering his travels from 1935 to 1936 within the state, which in those days was still a highly adventurous endeavour.

From 1935 to his death in 1979 he also regularly contributed to the Correio de São Paulo (1935–1938), Jornal da Manhã (1939–1941), A Noite (1943–1944), Correio Paulistano (1945–1948), Estado de São Paulo (1941 to 1943), Folha da Tarde, Folha de S.Paulo, Gazeta Mercantil (1968 to 1972) in São Paulo, Correio da Manhã, O Radical (1949–1952) – and o Semanario, in Rio de Janeiro, as well as in several magazines, Brasil Gráfico (1955 to 1958), Revista de Organização e Produtividade (1960–1967) and Revista Industria e Desenvolvimento (1972 to 1979).

In 1949 he travelled to Buenos Aires, Argentina, where he interviewed Juan Domingo Perón, the powerful politician and President of Argentina, producing a series of interesting and in-depth articles on the Argentine economy, political trends and social behaviour in a time where the Peronista movement was getting momentum in that rich country. In 1957 he travelled to Caracas, Venezuela, as a special reporter for Diários Associados interviewing politicians and civil society to expose Venezuela realities to Brazilian eyes. He also travelled to La Paz, Bolivia, to conduct a series of interviews with local political leaders and civil society, but was not successful since one of the several coups détat just occurred at the time when he arrived in there, leaving him "arrested" in the country, without options to return, so chaotic was the situation initially.

== Desbravador ==
In 1952, he received an invitation from a long standing friend Cel. Thyrso Silva Gomes to endeavor a totally different activity in the recently accessible locality of Querência do Norte, Paranavaí in the State of Paraná, southern of Brazil: to open, develop and manage Porto Brasílio´s port coffee plantation, which he gladly accepted as a new challenge to his life. Obviously to say that a much bigger challenge was that of his wife Jenny, left in São Paulo, due to children's schooling, and taking care, alone, of their three children: M;Helena, M.Lucia and Roberto.

Needless to say, during the period he stayed in Paranavai, with eventual visits to his family in São Paulo, several were the occasions of real danger, since the region was quite wild in those days and a " western movie atmosphere" was present in the day-life. Once he convinced Jenny of moving, with all children, to Paranavai plantation. She accepted on the premises that she would have to SEE the place first ! So they went to Paranavai ! Traveling was fine up to the entrance of the farm, where a gunfire gang was awaiting the couple " to talk". With great ability and very courageously he drove the situation to his and Jenny's favor. Jenny, however, was so outraged that decided never to live there, but rather staying in São Paulo, waiting for his return.

In 1955, ending his successful farmer's experience, he returned to São Paulo, and restarted his interrupted media contributions. A new engagement was awaiting for him: that of Brazil's producing and tasting the best coffee in the world, a campaign he developed throughout the Revista de Organização e Produtividade and press in general as Consumo de Cafe e Cursos IBC, 1960,O Estado de S. Paulo;Correio Paulistano;Os Cursos de Classificação do Café Estão Fadados a Provocar Verdadeira Revolução no Consumo Domético e Mundial; Consumo do Café no Mercado Interno; Segue o Cafe a Vocação Suicida dos Ciclos Economicos Brasileiros ?; Meio Seculo de Combate a Erosão e à Rotina, that indeed contributed to change the coffee tasting habits in Brazil .

So engaged was Villas Bôas on the fate of coffee in Brazil that he started to look for partners to produce an epic movie on Palheta's life and actions to introduce coffee, from the French Guiana into the Brazilian territory . However, lack of financing postponed, indefinitely, this dream and project.
