= Tom Crawford (cricketer) =

English cricketer (1910–1979)

Personal information
- Full name: Thomas Alan Crawford
- Born: 18 February 1910; Hoo, Kent
- Died: 6 December 1979 (aged 69); Westminster, London
- Batting: Right-handed
- Bowling: Right-arm off break

Domestic team information
- Years: Team
- 1930–1951: Kent

Career statistics
Competition	First-class
Matches	13
Runs scored	150
Batting average	10.00
100s/50s	0/0
Top score	32
Balls bowled	36
Wickets	0
Bowling average	–
5 wickets in innings	–
10 wickets in match	–
Best bowling	–
Catches/stumpings	2/–
- Source: CricInfo, 4 February 2012

Thomas Alan Crawford (18 February 1910 – 6 December 1979) was an English cricketer. Crawford was a right-handed batsman who bowled right-arm off break. He was born at Hoo in Kent and was educated at Tonbridge School.

Crawford made his first-class cricket debut for Kent County Cricket Club against Gloucestershire in the 1930 County Championship. Playing sporadically, he made four first-class appearances in that season, seven in 1932 and two in 1937. Following World War II, Crawford made a further first-class appearance in the 1951 County Championship against Northamptonshire. Making a total of thirteen first-class appearances, Crawford scored 150 runs at an average of 10.00, with a high score of 32.

Despite his few appearances for Kent, he did make regular appearances for the Second XI, which he captained from 1950 to 1955, though he had played Second XI cricket since 1928. Described as an attacking batsman and good driver of the ball, Crawford was said to have a deep knowledge of the game. He later served on the Kent committee, and in 1968 was appointed President of the club. He later became the chairman of the committee, but almost immediately had to resign the post due to ill health.

He died at Westminster in London on 6 December 1979.

== Bibliography ==
- Carlaw, Derek (2020). Kent County Cricketers, A to Z: Part One (1806–1914) (PDF). Cardiff: ACS.
