= Andrology =

Medical specialty

Andrologist
Occupation
- Names: Doctor, medical specialist
- Occupation type: Specialty
- Activity sectors: Medicines

Description
- Education required: Doctor of Medicine; Doctor of Osteopathic Medicine; Bachelor of Medicine, Bachelor of Surgery
- Fields of employment: Hospitals, clinics

Andrology (from Ancient Greek: ἀνήρ, anēr, genitive ἀνδρός, andros 'man' and -λογία, -logia) is a name for the medical specialty that deals with male health, particularly relating to the problems of the male reproductive system and urological problems that are unique to men. It is the parallel to gynecology, which deals with medical issues which are specific to female health, especially reproductive and urologic health.

== Process ==
Andrology covers anomalies in the connective tissues pertaining to the genitalia, as well as changes in the volume of cells, such as in genital hypertrophy or macrogenitosomia.

From reproductive and urologic viewpoints, male-specific medical and surgical procedures include vasectomy, vasovasostomy (one of the vasectomy reversal procedures), orchidopexy, circumcision, sperm/semen cryopreservation, surgical sperm retrieval, semen analysis (for fertility or post-vasectomy), sperm preparation for assisted reproductive technology (ART) as well as intervention to deal with male genitourinary disorders such as the following:

- Balanitis
- Carcinoma of the penis
- Cryptorchidism
- Epididymitis
- Epispadias
- Erectile dysfunction
- Frenulum breve
- Hydrocele
- Hypospadias
- Infertility
- Micropenis
- Orchitis
- Paraphimosis
- Penile fracture
- Peyronie's disease
- Phimosis
- Post-vasectomy pain syndrome
- Priapism
- Prostate cancer
- Prostatitis
- Retrograde ejaculation
- Seminal vesiculitis
- Spermatocele
- Testicular cancer
- Testicular torsion
- Varicocele

== History ==
Unlike gynaecology, which has a plethora of medical board certification programs worldwide, andrology has none. Andrology has only been studied as a distinct specialty since the late 1960s: the first specialist journal on the subject was the German periodical Andrologie (now called Andrologia), published from 1969 onwards. The next specialty journal covering both the basic and clinical andrology was the International Journal of Andrology, established in 1978, which became the official journal of the European Academy of Andrology in 1992. In 1980 the American Society of Andrology launched the Journal of Andrology. In 2012, these two society journals merged into one premier journal in the field, named Andrology, with the first issue published in January 2013.

== See also ==
- Men's health
- Reproductive health
- Urology
