= Bill Johnstone (footballer, born 1900) =

Australian rules footballer, born 1900

Personal information
- Full name: William David Johnstone
- Born: 20 February 1900; Carlton, Victoria
- Died: 13 December 1979 (aged 79); Ascot Vale, Victoria
- Height: 183 cm (6 ft 0 in)
- Weight: 77 kg (170 lb)

Playing career^{1}
Years	Club	Games (Goals)
1929	North Melbourne	3 (0)
- ^{1} Playing statistics correct to the end of 1929.

William David Johnstone (20 February 1900 – 13 December 1979) was an Australian rules footballer who played with North Melbourne in the Victorian Football League (VFL).
