= European Journal of Obstetrics & Gynecology and Reproductive Biology =

- Discipline: Obstetrics and gynecology
- Language: English
- Edited by: Janesh K. Gupta

Publication details
- Former name(s): European Journal of Obstetrics and Gynecology; Nederlandsch Tijdschrift voor Verloskunde en Gynaecologie
- History: 1889–present
- Publisher: Elsevier
- Frequency: Monthly
- Impact factor: 2.3 (2023)

Standard abbreviations
- ISO 4: Eur. J. Obstet. Gynecol. Reprod. Biol.

Indexing
- CODEN: EOGRAL
- ISSN: 0301-2115 (print); 1872-7654 (web)
- OCLC no.: 780575357

Links
- Journal homepage; Online access; Online archive

The European Journal of Obstetrics & Gynecology and Reproductive Biology is a monthly peer-reviewed medical journal covering obstetrics and gynecology and reproductive biology. It was originally established as Nederlandsch Tijdschrift voor Verloskunde en Gynaecologie in 1889, briefly renaming itself European Journal of Obstetrics and Gynecology in 1971, and acquiring its current name in 1972. and is published by Elsevier. The editor-in-chief is Janesh K. Gupta (University of Birmingham). According to the Journal Citation Reports, the journal has a 2017 impact factor of 1.809.
