= Franz Zinner =

German weightlifter

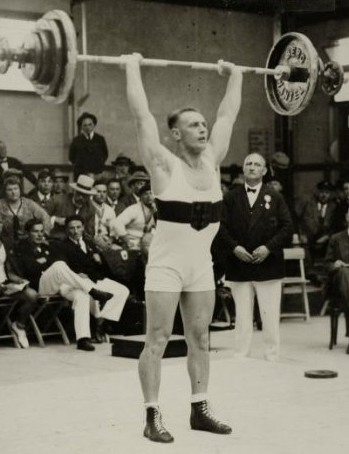
- Franz Zinner at the 1928 Olympics

Personal information
- Born: 19 July 1902 Würzburg, Germany
- Died: 16 December 1979 (aged 77) Würzburg, Germany

Sport
- Sport: Weightlifting
- Club: TG Würzburg

Franz Xaver Zinner (19 July 1902 – 16 December 1979) was a German weightlifter. He competed at the 1928 Summer Olympics in the middleweight category (under 75 kg) and finished in fourth place. Between 1923 and 1928 he set six unofficial middleweight world records: four in the snatch, one in the clean and jerk, and one in the total.
