= Margarete Nischwitz =

German politician (1891–1979)

Margarete Nischwitz (born Margarete Stock; 17 October 1891 – 10 December 1979) was a German political activist and politician (KPD). She sat as a member of the Saxony regional parliament (Landtag) in Dresden between 1929 and 1933.

== Life ==
Margarete "Grete" Stock was born in Chemnitz. She grew up in a one-parent family. Her mother was a textiles worker.

Margarete Stock also worked in the textiles sector. In 1912 she married Paul Nischwitz. 1912 was also the year in which she joined the Social Democratic Party ("Sozialdemokratische Partei Deutschlands" / SPD). In 1917 she was one of many left wing party activists who broke away, forming the Independent Social Democratic Party ("Unabhängige Sozialdemokratische Partei Deutschlands" / USPD). A party split had been brewing since 1914 when the party leadership had implemented what amounted to a parliamentary truce over voting in the Reichstag to fund the war. In 1918 Margarete Nischwitz joined the Spartacus League: again the defining issue was opposition to the war. Over the next couple of years the Spartacus League and USPD were replaced and consolidated into the new Communist Party of Germany. Margarete Nischwitz was a co-founder of the Communist Party in the Chemnitz North district and became the women's leader for the Chemnitz Communist Party.

Between 1921 and 1933 she sat as a Communist member of the Chemnitz city council. Between 1929 and 1932, based in Dresden, she headed up the women's secretariat of the party's regional leadership team ("Bezirksleitung") for Saxony. In 1925 Nischwitz was elected to chair the Saxony Red Women's and Girls' League ("Roter Frauen- und Mädchenbund" / RFMB). In 1928 she was sent to Moscow as a delegate at the sixth world congress of the Communist International where she spoke on women's matters ("Frauenfrage").

In 1929 she was elected to the Saxony regional parliament (Landtag). She stood for election again in 1930 and was re-elected. For the 1930 election her name was placed in third position on the party candidate list. In the assembly she remained, till 1931, a deputy leader of the party group.

In 1932 Nischwitz resigned from her senior party positions because of a personal crisis that combined political and family elements. One day before the state election of May 1930 her husband, Paul Nischwitz, resigned from the Communist Party and joined the Social Democratics. The local party leadership ("Bezirksleitung") reacted by instructing Margarete to divorce her husband which she refused to do. On 10 February 1931 she resigned her seat in the "Landtag". In 1932 she resigned from the party. Her Landtag seat went to Richard Schubert. For Nischwitz the episode led to a lengthy nervous breakdown and a period in a mental institution.

After 1933 Nischwitz was taken into protective custody on several occasions during the Nazi years and placed under police surveillance. Despite her communist past she nevertheless survived, and after the regime collapsed in the wake of military defeat she rejoined the Communist Party in 1945. Based on agreements between the victorious powers the western two thirds of Germany were now to be divided into military zones of occupation. The large central chunk that included Saxony was administered as the Soviet occupation zone. As a response to the widespread belief that the Nazis had been able to take power in 1933 only because of divisions between the parties of the left, a new political party, the Socialist Unity Party ("Sozialistische Einheitspartei Deutschlands" / SED), was formed in April 1946 through a contentious merger involving the Communists and Social Democrats. Although there may have been hopes that the SED would take root across Germany, in reality the effect of the exercise was restricted to the Soviet zone. Margarete Nischwitz was one of thousands of comrades who lost little time in signing their party memberships over from the Communist Party to the new SED. However, her party activities were now restricted to low level duties. In October 1949 the Soviet occupation zone was relaunched as the Soviet sponsored German Democratic Republic (East Germany). Nischwitz was celebrated as a "party veteran", being a recipient in 1976 of the Patriotic Order of Merit in gold.

== Personal life ==
During her final years she lived in Frohnau, a historical mining village in the hills to the south of Dresden. She died in Frohnau on 10 December 1979.
