= Fayette S. Dunn =

Fayette S. Dunn (October 31, 1903 – December 11, 1979) was president and chairman of the board of the Otis Elevator Company starting in 1964.

== See also ==
- Elevator
- Escalator
