= Wolter Edward Hellén =

- Born: 9 March 1890; Helsinki, Grand Duchy of Finland
- Died: 31 December 1979 (aged 89)
- Known for: Taxonomy of Hymenoptera (Ichneumonidae)
- Spouse: Mary Linnea Hellén
- Scientific career
- Fields: Entomology

Wolter Edward Hellén (9 March 1890 – 31 December 1979) was a Finnish entomologist, best known for his taxonomic work on parasitoid wasps of the family Ichneumonidae.

== Biography ==
Hellén was born in Helsinki on 9 March 1890 and died on 31 December 1979 at the age of 89. He was married to Mary Linnea Hellén.

== Taxonomic work ==
In 1915, Hellén established several higher taxa within the hymenopteran subfamily Pimplinae. He is credited as the author of at least three tribes of apocritan wasps:

- Delomeristini
- Ephialtini
- Polysphinctini
