= Florence Hochschild Austrian =

American artist and preservationist

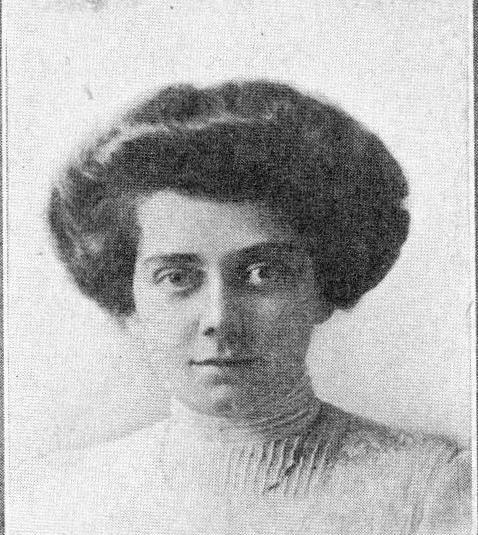
- Born: September 8, 1889; Baltimore
- Died: December 13, 1979; Baltimore
- Occupation: Artist

Florence Hochschild Austrian (née Hochschild; September 8, 1989 – December 13, 1979) was an American artist and preservationist from Baltimore, Maryland.

Florence Hochschild was born on September 8, 1889 in Baltimore, the daughter of German-born Jewish department store magnate Max Hochschild. She graduated from Goucher College in 1910 and studied art at the Maryland Institute College of Art with John Sloan and Leon Kroll. Her work largely focused on the streets and architecture of the Baltimore area, and she exhibited her work at the Baltimore Museum of Art, the Corcoran Gallery of Art, and the Pennsylvania Academy of the Fine Arts.

In December 1914, she married Dr. Charles Robert Austrian, a professor at Johns Hopkins University School of Medicine.

Though they grew up in the same upper class Jewish social circles in Baltimore, Austrian was not a fan of the modernist novelist Gertrude Stein, declaring "Gertrude Stein is one of those people who get away with murder."

Austrian lived almost her entire life in her Eutaw Place neighborhood of Baltimore after her family moved there in the 1890s. As the once-fashionable neighborhood declined, she tenaciously fought for its preservation and revitalization for half a century. She inspired a plan by the city to sell dilapidated homes at a discount to owners willing to restore them. When the wing of a cast-iron goose was stolen from a neighborhood fountain, Austrian demanded the city "look on every dump heap and see if you can't find that goose." The wing was retrieved and the fountain repaired.

Florence Hochschild Austrian died at her Eutaw Place home on 13 December 1979 at the age of 90.
