= John Walton (cricketer) =

English cricketer

Personal information
- Full name: John Cresswell Walton
- Born: 9 June 1888; Greenwich, Kent, England
- Died: Q3 1970; Bromley, Kent, England
- Batting: Right-handed
- Bowling: Right-arm medium

Domestic team information
- Years: Team
- 1925: Ireland

Career statistics
Competition	First-class
Matches	1
Runs scored	52
Batting average	26.00
100s/50s	–/–
Top score	48
Balls bowled	24
Wickets	–
Bowling average	–
5 wickets in innings	–
10 wickets in match	–
Best bowling	–
Catches/stumpings	–/–
- Source: Cricinfo, 5 November 2018

John Cresswell Walton (9 June 1888 – 2 December 1979) was an English first-class cricketer.

== Early life ==
Walton was born at Greenwich in October 1896. A police officer, Walton served in the Royal Ulster Constabulary.

== Cricket career ==
Walton played his club cricket for North of Ireland, and first represented Ireland in a minor match against the Marylebone Cricket Club at Belfast in 1924; the previous season, he had represented the Northern Cricket Union in a minor match against the touring West Indians. He made a single appearance in first-class cricket for Ireland against Wales at Llandudno during Ireland's 1925 tour of England and Wales. Opening the batting, Walton scored 48 runs in Ireland's first-innings, before being dismissed by Frank Ryan, while in their second-innings he was dismissed for 4 runs by Jack Mercer. He did not feature for Ireland after this match. He returned to England around the mid-1920s, as he no longer features in club scorecards in Ireland after this period. He died at Bromley in the third quarter of 1970. (Note: CricketArchive lists a JC Walton as representing Suffolk as a bowler in the 1938 Minor Counties Championship. This is unlikely to be the same player, given he would have been 50 at the time, a somewhat advanced age for a medium pace bowler at minor counties level.)
