= Robert William Alexander =

Irish novelist

- Born: Robert William Alexander; 21 November 1905; Dublin, Ireland
- Died: 17 December 1979 (aged 74)
- Occupation: Writer of
- Writing career
- Pen name: Joan Butler
- Genres: mainly pulp fiction and adventure novels

Robert William Alexander was an Irish writer (usual pen name: Joan Butler) (21 November 1905 - 17 December 1979). With regard to the novels he wrote, under the pen name of Joan Butler, Alexander developed a funny style which echoed that of such authors as Thorne Smith and P. G. Wodehouse

== Biography ==
Robert was born on 21 November 1905, in his family's house at Railway Avenue, Sutton, County Dublin, some 12 km northeast of the city center. Robert's father was an electrical engineer who worked with the Great Northern Railway (Ireland). The company ran the Hill of Howth Tramway, which ran between Sutton and Howth railway station, which opened in 1901. The Alexanders were the first family to take possession of one of the houses built by the company for the engineers, in Railway Avenue. The family remained settled there during Robert's (Bobby's) youth. Robert was the fourth son and the youngest child. Mary was the eldest, and John (Jack) and Ellen Christina (Eileen) followed later. Their parents, James and Ellen, were born in Waterford and moved to Dublin when they married.

== List of published works ==
- As Joan Butler
  - The Light Lover, 1929
  - The Heavy Husband, 1930
  - Unnatural Hazards, 1931
  - Monkey Business, 1932
  - Bed and Breakfast, 1933
  - High Pressure, 1934
  - Mixed Pickle, 1934
  - Trouble Brewing, 1935
  - Team Work, 1936
  - Half Shot, 1937
  - Something Rich, 1937
  - Half Holiday, 1938
  - Lost Property, 1938
  - Happy Christmas!, 1939
  - All Found, 1940
  - Cloudy Weather, 1940
  - Ground Bait, 1941
  - Sun Spots, 1942
  - Shirty Work, 1943
  - Fresh Heir, 1944
  - Low Spirits, 1945
  - Rapid Fire, 1945
  - Double Figures, 1946
  - Full House, 1947
  - The Old Firm, 1947
  - Loving Cup, 1948
  - Heat Haze, 1949
  - Sheet Lightning, 1950
  - Strictly Speaking, 1950
  - Soothing Syrup, 1951
  - Deep Freeze, 1952
  - Set Fair, 1952
  - Gilt Edged, 1953
  - Lucky Dip, 1953
  - Landed Gentry, 1954
  - Paper Money, 1954
  - All Change, 1955
  - Space to Let, 1955
  - Bridal Suite, 1956
  - Inside Work, 1956
  - Ready Cash, 1957
  - Home Run, 1958
- As Robert William Alexander
  - Black Pearl, 1926
  - The Path of the Sun, 1927
  - Trail's End, 1934
  - Mariner's Rest, 1943
  - Back to Nature, 1945
  - Rustler's Trail, 1955
  - The Killing at Broken Wheel, 1958
- As Ralph Temple
  - Cuckoo Time, 1944
  - Head Piece, 1953
