= Willie, West and McGinty =

British comedy act

Willie, West and McGinty performing in the 1930 movie Plastered

Willie, West and McGinty was a British comedy act who performed in music halls and in American vaudeville. The act was developed in the early 1900s by English comedians Bill Briscoe (William Briscoe; 25 December 1885 – 3 May 1949) and Frank Crossley (Frank Marsh Crossley; 1 January 1879 – 5 November 1942). Augmented by family members and other performers, it continued into the 1950s. They were billed under various guises, such as "The House Wreckers", "The Comedy Builders", and "A Billion Building Blunders".

== History ==
Crossley was born in Newton Heath, Manchester, England, and Briscoe in Kirkby Lonsdale, Westmorland. Briscoe initially worked as an acrobat in the comic duo of Wild and West, but in the early 1900s he began working with Crossley, as the duo Willie West (with no comma) and McGinty. They initially intended to work together as acrobats, but while en route to perform in Australia instead decided to perform a slapstick comedy act as a pair of incompetent carpenters or builders. When they returned to Lancashire, a third (unnamed) performer joined the act, and was later replaced by Rue Corré (Rupert William Herbert Corri, 17 July 1895, Whitby, Yorkshire – 9 December 1979, Miami, Florida). The name of the act was subtly changed by the inclusion of a comma, to indicate that there were now three performers, with Corré as "Willie", Briscoe as "West", and Crossley as "McGinty".

The trio's knockabout comedy involved three builders constructing a house, in which everything went wrong. They would clumsily hit each other with planks of wood, buckets of water or cement would fall on them, ladders would break, and so on. The props (constructed from such materials as balsa wood, cardboard and flour) would be manipulated awkwardly, with disastrous results. The act was carried out with perfect timing; the performers would generally act as though nothing was wrong, ignore their audience, and resume their tasks.

The act became highly popular on vaudeville and variety stages in the 1910s and 1920s, performing in the Ziegfeld Follies of 1923 and at the Hippodrome in 1924. They played at the prestigious Palace Theatre several times, and toured widely, in the U.S. and elsewhere, while often returning to Britain. There were several changes of personnel, with Briscoe's son Billy West Jr. (William Joseph Briscoe; 31 May 1909, Waddington, Lancashire – 20 June 1971, Bradford, New Hampshire), and Crossley's son Frank Crossley Jr. (Frank Hamilton Crossley; 5 September 1907, Manchester – 21 July 1994, Fort Myers, Florida) often performing as alternates or replacements from the late 1920s.

The group continued to be successful into the 1930s, and toured worldwide. In 1930, they performed their act in the short film Plastered, directed for Paramount Pictures by Norman Taurog, and in several other shorts including Cheaper to Rent (1931) and One On the House (1937), as well as cameos in The Big Broadcast of 1936 and Beautiful but Broke (1944). They featured in Billy Rose's Aquacade show at the New York World's Fair in 1939, and in the 1944 Olsen and Johnson revue, Laffing Room Only.

The act's founders, Briscoe and Crossley, both died in the 1940s: Crossley in 1942 in Radcliffe, Lancashire, England; and Briscoe in 1949 in Bradford, New Hampshire, U.S.. Their sons continued with the act, with Ted Corradine (1889–1975) acting as McGinty from the early 1940s, and Donald Keith being the third member of the act in the 1950s. The act appeared in several shows on television in the 1950s, including The Colgate Comedy Hour and The Ed Sullivan Show, and also performed in live shows at the Palace Theatre, at fairs, in Judy Garland's International Variety Show, and elsewhere.
