= Gerard van Leur =

Dutch footballer

Personal information
- Date of birth: 9 June 1917
- Date of death: 14 December 1979 (aged 62)

International career
Years	Team	Apps	(Gls)
1938	Netherlands	1	(1)

Gerard van Leur (9 June 1917 – 14 December 1979) was a Dutch footballer. He played in one match for the Netherlands national football team in 1938.
