= George Mills (cricketer, born 1916) =

New Zealand cricketer (1916–1979)

Personal information
- Full name: George Henry Mills
- Born: 1 August 1916; Dunedin, Otago, New Zealand
- Died: 17 December 1979 (aged 63); Dunedin, New Zealand
- Batting: Right-handed
- Role: Wicket-keeper

Domestic team information
- Years: Team
- 1935/36–1957/58: Otago

Career statistics
Competition	First-class
Matches	59
Runs scored	2,056
Batting average	19.96
100s/50s	2/6
Top score	121
Catches/stumpings	88/34
- Source: ESPNcricinfo, 1 December 2025

George Henry Mills (1 August 1916 – 17 December 1979) was a New Zealand cricketer. A wicket-keeper, he played 59 first-class matches, 55 of them for Otago between the 1935–36 and 1957–58 seasons.

Born at Dunedin in 1916 and educated at Otago Boys' High School, Mills was Otago's first-choice wicket-keeper for much of the time he played. He was an effective batsman who scored 2,056 first-class runs in his career and took 88 catches and made 34 stumpings. He played for a New Zealand XI in a trial match in January 1949, scoring a half-century, but did not receive an international cap. His final first-class match was his 44th Plunket Shield match, which equalled the competition record held by Alby Roberts. He worked professionally as a fitter and was an Otago selector.

Mills died at Dunedin in 1979, aged 63. An obituary was published in the following year's New Zealand Cricket Almanack.
