= Ali Gafarov =

Azerbaijani writer and playwright (1935–1979)

Ali Huseyn oglu Gafarov (Azerbaijani: Əli Hüseyn oğlu Qafarov, 16 October 1935 – 19 December 1979) was an Azerbaijani writer and playwright.

Gafarov was born in Synelnykove, Ukraine, but later moved with his family to Lankaran, Azerbaijan, where he finished middle school. In 1954 Gafarov entered the philological faculty of the Baku State University. Two years later he traveled to Moscow, where he entered the scenery art faculty of the Gerasimov Institute of Cinematography. In 1956–1960 Gafarov served a sentence in a Siberian prison camp for an alleged organization of a secret youth circle. In 1960–1962 Gafarov worked in topographic and drilling crews of Gidroenergoproyekt, Angara expedition and in the Soviet Ministry of the Power Plant Construction. In this period Gafarov published a novel Siberia, which gained the attention of literary community.

Having returned to Azerbaijan, Gafarov worked for five years in the newspaper Bakinsky Rabochy. In the end of the 1960s Gafarov entered the directorial and screenwriting courses at the academy of Aleksei Kapler. The 1970s were the heyday of Gafarov's creative work. He worked at the Azerbaijanfilm studio and wrote scripts for several feature and documentary films (particularly Golden Goose and By the Cabman's Trails). Natig Rasulzadeh said he remembered Gafarov as a good friend and honest man, whose short stories were compared to those by Vasily Shukshin.

Gafarov died untimely at the age of 44.
