= Jack Palmer (cricketer) =

Australian cricketer

Personal information
- Born: 20 October 1903; Adelaide, Australia
- Died: 11 December 1979 (aged 76)
- Source: Cricinfo, 18 September 2020

Jack Palmer (20 October 1903 – 11 December 1979) was an Australian cricketer. He played in one first-class match for South Australia in 1932/33.

== See also ==
- List of South Australian representative cricketers
