= Sergey Mostovoy =

Soviet Red Army soldier (1908–1978)

Sergey Andreyevich Mostovoy
- Сергей Андреевич Мостовой
- Born: 18 July 1908; Grinyov farm, Bogucharsky Uyezd, Voronezh Governorate, Russian Empire
- Died: 31 December 1979 (aged 71); Kalach, Voronezh Oblast, Soviet Union
- Military career
- Allegiance: Soviet Union
- Branch: Red Army
- Service years: 1941–1945
- Rank: Red Army man
- Unit: 79th Guards Rifle Division
- Conflicts: World War II; Vistula-Oder Offensive
- Awards: Hero of the Soviet Union; Order of Lenin; Medal for Battle Merit

Sergey Andreyevich Mostovoy (Russian: Сергей Андреевич Мостовой; 18 July 1908 – 31 December 1979) was a Red Army man and Hero of the Soviet Union. Mostovoy was awarded the title Hero of the Soviet Union and the Order of Lenin for his actions during the Vistula–Oder Offensive.

== Early life ==
Mostovoy was born on 18 July 1908 on the Grinyov farm in Bogucharsky Uyezd of Voronezh Governorate to a Ukrainian peasant family. He graduated from elementary school and worked on the collective farm.

== World War II ==
Mostovoy was drafted into the Red Army in June 1941. He fought on the Central Front in the western defensive battles. He then fought on the Bryansk Front with the 284th Rifle Division. Mostovoy was transferred to the Southwestern Front along with his division and fought in the Battle of Stalingrad. In February 1943, the division became the 79th Guards Rifle Division. Mostovskoy fought in the Barvenkovo-Lozovaya Operation. In September and October 1943, he fought in the Battle of the Dnieper. Mostovoy then fought in the Nikopol–Krivoi Rog Offensive during January and February 1944. In March, he fought in the Bereznegovatoye–Snigirevka Offensive. In April, he fought in the Odessa Offensive. During the summer, he fought in the Lublin–Brest Offensive. During the Lublin-Brest Offensive, the division captured the Magnuszew bridgehead on the Vistula during the offensive.

By January 1945, Mostovoy was a machine gunner in the 3rd Battalion of the division's 220th Guards Rifle Regiment. Starting on 14 January, the division began to attack out of the bridgehead. On that day, Mostovoy, despite heavy machine gun and mortar fire from German troops, crept close to the German trenches with his crew and reportedly killed 17 German soldiers, suppressing 3 firing positions. On 25 January, he was one of the first across the Warta and covered the crossing with machine gun fire. During subsequent fighting in the town of Warta, Mostovoy destroyed two German machine guns and reportedly killed 13 German soldiers. He also helped repulse numerous German counterattacks. On 28 February, he was awarded the Medal for Battle Merit for his actions. For his actions, Mostovoy was also awarded the title Hero of the Soviet Union and the Order of Lenin on 24 March 1945. According to Vasily Chuikov, Mostovoy was an extremely big and strong man. During the Oder crossing battle for Hill 81.5, he reportedly attacked German troops with a shovel and his machine gun's mounting after he ran out of grenades and ammunition. Mostovoy also reportedly captured a German soldier by tucking him under his arm. He continued to fight in combat and participated in the Berlin Offensive.

== Postwar ==
In 1945, Mostovoy was demobilized after the end of the war. He lived in Kalach and worked on a collective farm. Mostovoy died on 31 December 1979 at age 71. He was buried in Kalach.
