= Syed Barkatullah Barkat =

Indian Urdu and Persian poet (1905–1979)

Moulvi Syed Barkatullah Barkat
- Born: 1905; Odia Bazar, Cuttack, Bengal Presidency, British India
- Died: 16 December 1979 (aged 73–74); Odia Bazar, Cuttack, Orissa (now Odisha), India
- Occupations: Scholar, poet, orator
- Known for: Urdu and Persian poetry, leadership in Jamiat Ulama-e-Hind (Odisha)

Syed Barkatullah Barkat (1905 – 16 December 1979) was an Indian Urdu and Persian poet, Islamic scholar, and orator from Cuttack, Odisha. He was involved in the Indian freedom movement and remained active in literary, religious, and political life in Odisha. He was the first president of the Odisha unit of Jamiat Ulama-e-Hind and served in that role for many years.

== Early life and education ==
Syed Barkatullah Barkat was born in 1905 in Odia Bazar, Cuttack. His father, Syed Mukarram Ali, was a well-known trader. His ancestors migrated from Murshidabad to Cuttack in 1856 and belonged to the Sadaat-e-Bara lineage. Barkat received his early education at home from private tutors and became proficient in Arabic, Persian, and Urdu.

He later travelled to Allahabad, where he studied the qirāʼat of Ḥafṣ under Muhammad Husain Allahabadi, a student of Abdul Rehman Makki. He then completed the advanced ten qirāʼāt (ʿAsharah) under Muhammad Abdullah Moradabadi.

He also studied poetry under Abdul Rahim Ahsan Sungarvi and was spiritually affiliated with Hussain Ahmad Madani.

== Career ==
Barkat was engaged in religious teaching and Qurʼanic instruction in Cuttack. He was involved in India's freedom movement and social reform. He presided over a public meeting held at the Qadam e Rasool shrine in Cuttack during the Quit India Movement in 1942, attended by leaders of both Hindu and Muslim communities and the Congress Party. He supported communal harmony and took part in interfaith efforts to promote peace and dialogue in the region.

In June 1937, Syed Fazlur Rahman Qasmi called for the formation of a provincial branch of Jamiat Ulama-e-Hind in Odisha through the weekly Muslim Gazette. On 15 August 1937, a public gathering was held after Maghrib prayer at Qadam-e-Rasool in Cuttack under the banner of Jamiat Ulama-e-Odisha, where Barkat was listed as president. According to later sources, he remained president of the Odisha unit for many years.

== Literary career ==
Barkat wrote poetry in both Urdu and Persian. His works often addressed national, religious, and social themes. Notable poems include Muslim Gazette se Sargoshi (A Whisper to the Muslim Gazette), Gandhi Ji (a tribute to Mahatma Gandhi and his role in India's freedom struggle), Dil (The Heart), and Insaan (The Human).

His ghazals reflect Sufi themes. One couplet reads:

Tabassum-raiz hai yak Ghaznavi shakl-e-Ayāzi mein
Haqīqat dekh le pinhāñ hai poshāk-e-majāzi mein

"There is a Ghaznavid smile on the face of an Ayaz; see the reality—hidden beneath a cloak of illusion."

Another pair of verses illustrates his blending of mystical reflection with emotional longing:

Kis munh se āfiyat kī tamanna kare koī
Shaidā-e-gham ho dil hī agar kyā kare koī

Zarre mein mehr, qatre mein daryā liye huʼe
Āyā hūñ bazm-e-hast mein kyā kyā liye huʼe

"With what face can one desire peace, if the heart itself is a devoted lover of sorrow? In a single speck there is sunlight; in each drop, an ocean — I have entered the assembly of existence carrying countless such depths."

Later, some of his poetry also reflected progressive ideas:

Maikhāna-e-jamhūr ke sāqī yeh batānā
Kyūñ chhīn liyā jātā hai paimāna kisī kā

"O cupbearer of the tavern of democracy, tell me—why is someone’s goblet taken away?"

He served as president of the literary society Bazm-e-Adab in Cuttack for many years and had numerous disciples across Odisha.

Although he left behind a large collection of poetry, much of it remains unpublished. According to Hafeezullah Newalpuri, a significant portion of his literary legacy was lost or scattered due to a lack of preservation by his heirs.

== Death ==
Barkat died on 16 December 1979 at his residence, Mukarram Manzil, in Odia Bazar, Cuttack. One of his ghazals was later included in the 10th-grade Urdu textbook Gulistan-e-Urdu published by the Odisha Board of Secondary Education.
