= Bill Lyte =

Australian rules footballer

Personal information
- Full name: William George Lyte
- Born: 21 August 1898; St Kilda, Victoria
- Died: 11 December 1979 (aged 81); Prahran, Victoria
- Original team: Melbourne Juniors
- Height: 173 cm (5 ft 8 in)

Playing career^{1}
Years	Club	Games (Goals)
1921	Melbourne	1 (0)
1922	Footscray (VFA)	1 (0)
- ^{1} Playing statistics correct to the end of 1922.

William George Lyte (21 August 1898 – 11 December 1979) was an Australian rules footballer who played with Melbourne in the Victorian Football League (VFL).

Having served in the Army Reserve during World War I, Lyte later served in the Royal Australian Air Force during World War II as a carpenter.
