= Ella Kam Oon Chun =

- Born: March 28, 1915
- Died: December 3, 1979 (aged 64)
- Education: University of Hawaiʻi

Ella Kam Oon Chun, also Ella Chun (March 28, 1915 – December 3, 1979) was a journalist active in Hawaii, notable as the first Asian American woman reporter on the Honolulu Advertiser.

== Biography ==
She attended University of Hawaii and was a member of many clubs; she graduated in 1937. Chun joined The Honolulu Advertiser in 1937, where she was the first Asian American woman reporter.

Chun was the first woman journalist of any ethnic background at The Honolulu Advertiser to break away from the "society" pages when she became a City Hall reporter. In 1956, on the newspapers' centennial, Chun was honored as the longest serving reporter at the paper. Chun's work often covered Chinese life in Hawaii, from 150 years of Chinese presence there, to discussions of everyday life of fish sellers. Her work emphasized the positive aspects Chinese Americans brought to Hawaiian and American life. Her work also described cultural differences to overcome prejudices.

She also wrote on human interest affairs, particularly on women.

Chun also served as managing editor for the groundbreaking Waikiki Beach Press, established in 1952, which was one of the first four-color tourist brochures and included serious articles on Hawaiian life, authors, and culture.

Chun was friends with American actor Jack Lord.

=== Honors, awards, and recognition ===
She was included in Notable Women of Hawaii. The Asian American Journalists Association has honored Chun in the Honor Roll of Asian American Pioneers in Journalism.
