= Fred Harrison (Australian footballer) =

Australian rules footballer

Personal information
- Full name: Fred Harrison
- Born: 18 February 1893
- Died: 3 December 1979 (aged 86)
- Height: 179 cm (5 ft 10 in)
- Weight: 78 kg (172 lb)

Playing career^{1}
Years	Club	Games (Goals)
1915	St Kilda	1 (0)
- ^{1} Playing statistics correct to the end of 1915.

Fred Harrison (18 February 1893 – 3 December 1979) was an Australian rules footballer who played with St Kilda in the Victorian Football League (VFL).
