= Pierre Meuldermans =

Belgian footballer

Personal information
- Date of birth: 2 July 1914
- Date of death: 1 December 1979 (aged 65)

International career
Years	Team	Apps	(Gls)
1936–1938	Belgium	2	(0)

Pierre Meuldermans (2 July 1914 – 1 December 1979) was a Belgian footballer. He played in two matches for the Belgium national football team from 1936 to 1938.
