= Yut Angkinan =

Thai politician (1936–2023)

Member of the House of Representatives of Thailand
- In office 1983–2001

Pard Group Leader
- In office 14 June 1968 – 1983
- Preceded by: Pard Angkinandana
- Succeeded by: Buppha Robru
- In office 2001–2021
- Preceded by: Buppha Robru
- Succeeded by: Pholyuth Angkinantana

Personal details
- Born: 6 April 1936 Phetchaburi province, Siam
- Died: 17 February 2023 (aged 86) Phetchaburi province, Thailand
- Party: Thai Nation Party; Chart Pattana Party
- Education: Ramkhamhaeng University
- Occupation: Politician,Businessman

Yut Angkinan (also spelled Yuth and Angkinant, Thai: ยุทธ อังกินันทน์; 6 April 1936 – 17 February 2023) was a Thai politician. A member of the Thai Nation Party and later the Chart Pattana Party, he served in the House of Representatives from 1983 to 2001.

Yut died in Phetchaburi province on 17 February 2023, at the age of 86.
