= Jack Shelley (footballer) =

Australian rules footballer (1905–1979)

Personal information
- Full name: John Robert Shelley
- Born: 1 August 1905; St Kilda, Victoria
- Died: 3 December 1979 (aged 74); Sydney, New South Wales
- Original team: Melbourne Grammar School

Playing career^{1}
Years	Club	Games (Goals)
1925–26	St Kilda	2 (1)
- ^{1} Playing statistics correct to the end of 1926.

Jack Shelley (1 August 1905 – 3 December 1979) was an Australian rules footballer who played with St Kilda in the Victorian Football League (VFL).

Shelley later served in the Australian Army during World War II.
