= Jean Hamilton Walls =

First Black female graduate of University of Pittsburgh

- Born: Jean Hamilton; 1885; North Side (Pittsburgh)
- Died: December 9, 1979 (aged 93–94)
- Known for: First African American woman to enroll at the University of Pittsburgh, first African American woman to earn a PhD there

Jean Hamilton Walls (1885 – December 9, 1979) was the first African American woman to enroll at the University of Pittsburgh and to receive a PhD from that institution, in 1938. She earned a bachelor's degree in physics and mathematics at the University of Pittsburgh in 1910, becoming the university's first black female graduate.

== Early life and education ==
Jean Hamilton was born in 1885 in Pittsburgh’s North Side, one of six siblings, and the only one to live beyond the age of 41. Her mother, Sadie Black Hamilton, had studied at Wilberforce University and was a leader in their community. Walls graduated from Allegheny High School in 1904. In 1906, she was the first African American woman to enroll at the University of Pittsburgh, graduated in 1910 in physics and mathematics. She earned a master's degree in education from Howard University in 1912, with a thesis entitled “Teacher Training in Negro Normal Schools”.

In 1935, Walls undertook a PhD at the University of Pittsburgh, the first African American woman to do so. Her dissertation was A Study of Seventy-Eight Negro Graduates of the University of Pittsburgh from 1920-1936, and she graduated in 1938. She was one of only nine African Americans to earn a PhD that year in the entire United States.

== Teaching ==
Walls was a teacher at the Frederick Douglass High School in Baltimore, Maryland between 1914 and 1918, the Agricultural and Technical College in Greensboro, North Carolina and the Fort Valley School in Georgia.

== YWCA ==
She was the executive director of the Centre Avenue branch of the YWCA in Pittsburgh.

Walls was a member of the Alpha Kappa Alpha sorority, and in 1927 became a founder member of Pittsburgh’s graduate chapter of Alpha Alpha Omega.
