= David R. Nicholas =

American politician

Member of the Wyoming Senate from the Albany County district
- In office 1979–1986

Personal details
- Born: David R. Nicholas; May 2, 1941 Gillette, Wyoming, U.S.
- Died: March 13, 2005 (aged 63) Kiev, Ukraine
- Party: Republican
- Education: Harvard College (BA); University of Wyoming College of Law (LLB)
- Occupation: Attorney

David R. Nicholas (1941–2005) was an American politician and lawyer in the state of Wyoming. He served in the Wyoming Senate from 1979 to 1986. He was a member of the Republican party. He died in Kiev, Ukraine while an ambassador for the Organization for Security and Co-operation in Europe.
