= Yut Saeng-uthai =

Thai legal scholar

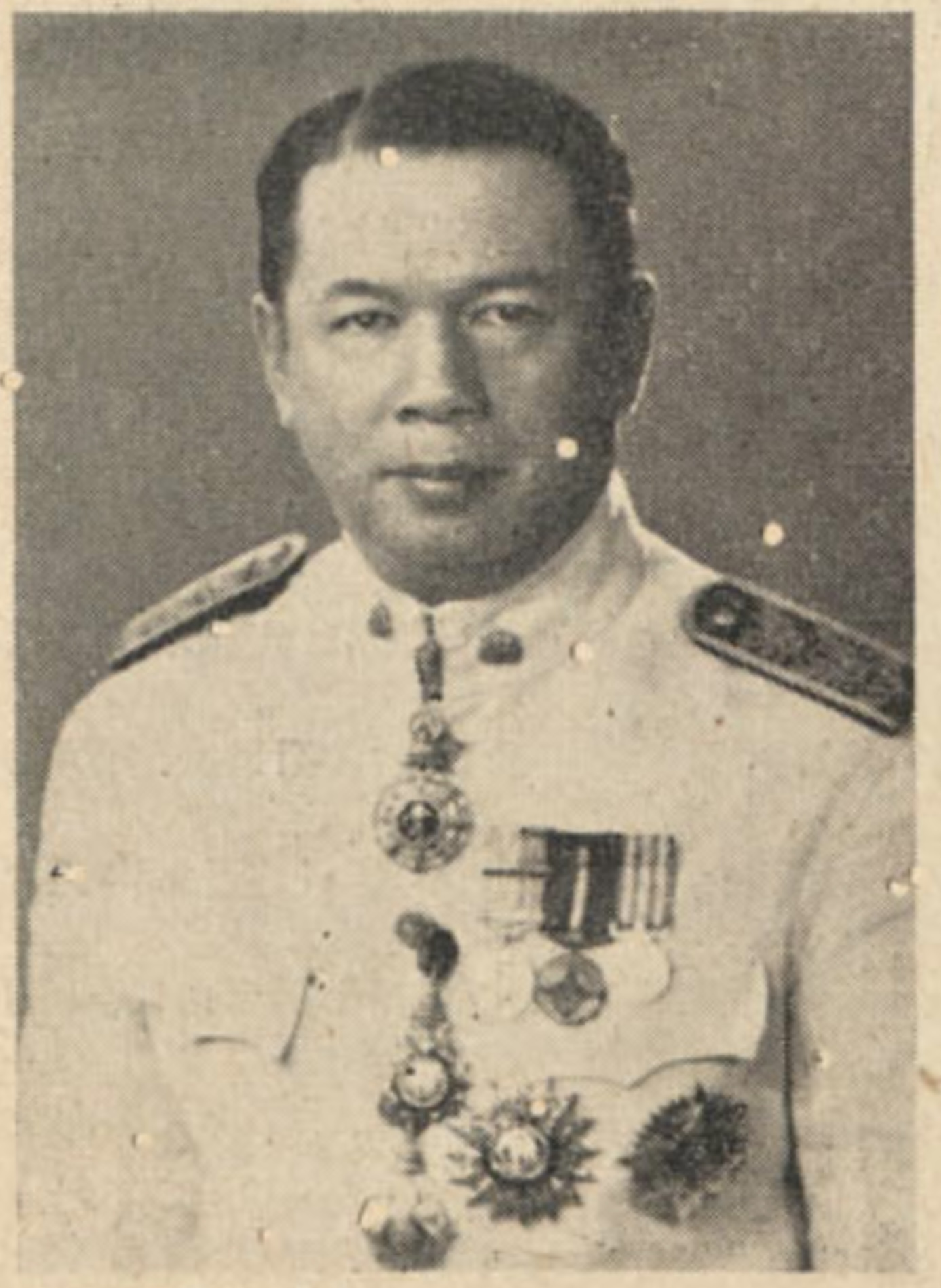
Saeng-uthai, circa 1954

Yut Saeng-uthai (Thai: หยุด แสงอุทัย, 8 April 1908 – 30 December 1979) was a Thai legal expert, who played major roles in the implementation of the country's constitution and legal system in the period following the Siamese revolution of 1932. He was also influential as an academic, writing 32 textbooks, many of which are regarded as classic texts in the field and remain in use over half a century later. He worked in the Office of the Council of State, serving as the Secretary of the Council of State and on many constitution- and law-drafting committees, and taught as an adjunct professor at Thammasat and Chulalongkorn universities.
