= Victor Lucas (footballer) =

Australian rules footballer, born 1907

Personal information
- Full name: Victor Lucas
- Born: 23 March 1907
- Died: 2 December 1979 (aged 72)
- Original team: Wagga Wagga

Playing career^{1}
| Years | Club | Games (Goals) |
| 1930 | St Kilda | 1 (0) |
- ^{1} Playing statistics correct to the end of 1930.

Victor Lucas (23 March 1907 – 2 December 1979) was an Australian rules footballer who played with St Kilda in the Victorian Football League (VFL).
