= Carl B. Koford =

American biologist

Carl Buckingham Koford (September 3, 1915, in Oakland, California – December 3, 1979, in Berkeley, California) was an American biologist who is known for his research work on the behavior of the California condor. He attended the Piedmont High School and studied at the University of Washington. Koford began his field work on the California condor in March 1939, spending more than 400 days collecting data. During World War II he interrupted his studies to serve in the U.S. Navy. In 1946 his observations on the condors continued. In 1953 he published the report "The California Condor" where he gave a first estimation of the world population of about 60 individuals. In the 1950s and again in the 1970s he went to South America where he made studies on species like the Vicuña, the Jaguar, the Ocelot or the Jaguarundi. After rumours about the survival of some individuals of Mexican grizzly bear, a species thought to be extinct, Koford went to Mexico in 1969 but failed to rediscover this bear.

After Koford's death in 1979 the Museum of Vertebrate Zoology at Berkeley established the Carl B. Koford Memorial Fund in 1980 to support field research on vertebrates.

== Eponyms ==
Koford's grass mouse (Akodon kofordi ), a rodent from Peru, was discovered in the 1980s and named in his honour. Also the eastern puna mouse (Punomys kofordi ) and the coastal leaf-toed gecko (Phyllodactylus kofordi ) were named after him.

== Publications (selected) ==
- Koford CB (1953). The California condor. Research Report No. 4. Washington, District of Columbia: National Audubon Society.
- Koford CB (1957). "The Vicuña and the Puna". Ecol. Monogr. 27: 153–219.
- Koford CB (1958). "Prairie dogs, white-faces and blue gramma". Wildlife Monogr. 3: 1–78.
- Koford CB (1969). "The last of the Mexican grizzly bear". IUCN Bulletin 2: 95.
- Koford CB (1973). "Spotted Cats in Latin America: An Interim Report". ORYX 12 (1): 37–39.
- Koford CB (1973). "Project 694. Status Survey of Jaguar and Ocelot in Tropical America". WORLD WILDLIFE YEARBOOK 1972–1973. 215–219.8.
- Koford CB (1976). "Latin American Cats: economic values and future prospects". THE WORLD CATS 3 (1).
