= Andrologia =

- Discipline: Andrology
- Language: English
- Edited by: Wolf-Bernhard Schill; Ralf Henkel

Publication details
- Former name(s): Andrologie
- History: 1969–present
- Publisher: Wiley-Blackwell
- Frequency: Bimonthly
- Impact factor: 2.532 (2021)

Standard abbreviations
- ISO 4: Andrologia

Indexing
- CODEN: ANDRDQ
- ISSN: 0303-4569 (print); 1439-0272 (web)
- LCCN: sc85004319
- OCLC no.: 00944824

Links
- Journal homepage; Online access; Online archive

Andrologia is a bimonthly peer-reviewed medical journal covering andrology. It was established in 1969 as Andrologie, obtaining its current name in 1974. It is published by Wiley-Blackwell, and the editors-in-chief are Wolf-Bernhard Schill (University of Giessen) and Ralf Henkel (University of the Western Cape). According to the Journal Citation Reports, the journal has a 2016 impact factor of 1.458, ranking it 3rd out of 5 journals in the category "Andrology".
