= Bergamini =

Bergamini is an Italian surname. The meaning of the name comes from the 'occupational name from bergamino ‘cowherd dairy farmer’ a derivative of the placename Bergamo the cowherds of the Po valley having originally come from Bergamo and the Bergamese Alps.'

Notable people with the surname include:

- Alyssa Bergamini (born 1992), American sports broadcaster
- Angelo Bergamini, founder of the Italian rock band Kirlian Camera
- Carlo Bergamini (disambiguation), multiple people
- David Bergamini (1928–1983), American writer
- Davide Bergamini (born 1973), Italian politician
- Deborah Bergamini (born 1967), Italian politician
- Donato Bergamini (1962–1989), Italian football midfielder and murder victim
- Giancarlo Bergamini (1926–2020), Italian fencer
- Joe Bergamini, American musician
- John Van Wie Bergamini (1888–1975), American architect
- Lamberto Bergamini (1885–1957), Italian opera singer
- Marco Bergamini (born 1988), Italian footballer
- Matteo Bergamini, founder of UK-based social enterprise Shout Out UK
- Silvio Bergamini (1923–1994), Italian rower

== See also ==
- Bergamin
