= The World We Live In (Life magazine) =

Science series that ran in Life magazine from 1952 to 1954

"The Earth is Born" - Part I (December 8, 1952).

"The World We Live In" appeared in the pages of LIFE magazine from December 8, 1952, to December 20, 1954. A science series, it comprised 13 parts published on an average of every eight weeks. Written by Lincoln Barnett, The World We Live In spanned a diverse range of topics concerning planet Earth and universe, and employed the talents of artists and photographers, including cameramen Alfred Eisenstaedt and Fritz Goro and artists Rudolph Zallinger and Chesley Bonestell. The parts were illustrated with art and photos, often presented in large gatefolds.

== Magazine articles ==
The Pageant of Life – Part V
(September 7, 1953)

The Starry Universe – Part XIII
(December 20, 1954)

"The World We Live In" was introduced to LIFE's readership as "the greatest series of science stories we have ever produced". It promised a "unified, understandable picture story of the planet Earth" authored by Lincoln Barnett, "one of the most literate authors in the field of science". The series itself started two issues later. Each part was assigned to a reporter, who was granted eight months to research the subject, organize the data, and oversee the photography and artwork. This opportunity to travel, learn, and explore on company expense was known informally as a "Luce fellowship".

- I. The Earth Is Born - published Dec. 8, 1952. Illustrated by Chesley Bonestell, the first installment of the series covered the formation of the Earth, its composition, and its eventual demise. Contemporary principles of geology were also introduced.
- II. The Miracle Of the Sea - published Feb. 9, 1953. The second part of the series discussed the geology and geography of the ocean, its, and its effect on coastlines. The first to include a gatefold, it featured a panoramic geological cross-section of the Atlantic and Pacific coastlines of North America. The part was given to science reporter Nancy Genet, who requested "a couple of hours" with oceanographer Maurice Ewing and ended up spending two weeks, a fact Ewing remembered years later. She also had the idea of representing the seafloor in panoramic view, and drafted the concept on a scotch-taped "giant toilet paper roll" of paper 85 feet long. The final artwork was done by James Lewicki.
- III. The Face Of the Land - published Apr. 15, 1953 Surface geology was the focus of the third part, which provided overviews of mountain formation and erosion. The geological formation of the New York area was included as a sample history. The gatefold showed forces of uplift in a bare landscape on one side, and the same landscape after the effects of erosion on the other side.
- IV. The Canopy Of Air - published Jun. 8, 1953. Part 4 was the only issue not to be featured on the cover of LIFE; instead, the cover story was on Roy Campanella. The Canopy Of The Air featured clouds, air currents, chemical cycles, and other atmospheric phenomena.
- V. The Pageant Of Life - published Sept. 7, 1953 After a discussion of evolution, the history of life on Earth is recounted, starting with single-celled organisms and ending with the demise of the dinosaurs. For the gatefold, Rudolph Zallinger's The Age of Reptiles mural was used; however, the version in The World We Live In was Zallinger's preliminary, detailed study. The actual mural in the Peabody Museum is significantly different.
- VI. The Age Of Mammals - published Oct 19, 1953 Zallinger was commissioned to produce another panoramic mural, this time showcasing the evolution of mammals in North America across the Cenozoic, from small Paleocene animals to the woolly mammoth and Megatherium. The mural was eventually revised dramatically for the Peabody Museum, with several animals (such as the mammoth) revamped completely.
- VII. Creatures Of the Sea - published Nov 30, 1953 After the physical properties of the ocean in part II, part VII introduced the organisms living in it. The gatefold showed the diversity of marine life on one side, and benthic organisms on the other.
- VIII. The Coral Reef - published Feb 8, 1954. Types of coral reef, different species of coral, and the colorful denizens of the Great Barrier reef were present in this part.
- IX. The Land Of The Sun - published Apr 5, 1954 Focusing on the Sonoran Desert, part IX explained the vicissitudes of life in the desert and the adaptations of desert animals. The gatefold, painted by James Perry Wilson of the American Museum of Natural History, showed the same desert scene by day and by night. A perfectionist, Wilson worked slowly and included as much detail as possible in the panoramas. He was unable to finish by the deadline, and some animals were painted by Robert Gartland. Both paintings were presented to the Peabody Museum in 1976 by Wilson's nephews.
- X. The Arctic Barrens - published Jun 7, 1954. Life on the cold tundra was described in this installment, with a gatefold showing the seasonal transitions of the tundra. LIFE photographer Fritz Goro and reporter Jim Goode camped on the tundra for some seven weeks to obtain all the photos they needed, and by the end were reduced to living on macaroni.
- XI. The Rain Forest - published Sep 20, 1954 The lush Amazon rainforest of Dutch Guiana was covered in part XI, with photos and several double-page spreads and a gatefold painted by Zallinger illustrating life in the forest. Zallinger, photographer Alfred Eisenstaedt, and reporter David Bergamini spent two months in Surinam gathering data.
- XII. The Woods Of Home - published Nov 8, 1954 Terrain more familiar to LIFE's readers was discussed here, as the effects of the seasons are observed in the changing woods. Artwork by Walter Linsenmaier depicted animals of forest and pond, as well as insects of the ground and the trees. The photographs were taken in Mettler's Woods, now the Hutcheson Memorial Forest.
- XIII. The Starry Universe - published Dec 20, 1954 Part XIII closed the series on a suitably grand scale, with Bonestell's art depicting the stars and planets. The gatefold showed a scale depiction of the Solar System on one side, and the Local Group on the other.

== Reprints ==
After its successful run at LIFE magazine, The World we Live in was released in book form in 1955, abridged in 1956 for younger readers by Jane Werner Watson, and re-released in a three-volume "Family Edition" in 1962.

Some minor schematic diagrams were cut to better fit the format of the book. Some of Chesley Bonestell's art, notably the painting illustrating the end of the Earth, were removed, possibly because they were seen as dated by then. Jane Werner Watson's edition for young readers cropped many pictures or removed them altogether; for instance, the Paleocene landscape was removed, while the eroded geological panorama was relegated to the endpapers. This led to some odd situations, with some captions referring to animals that were cropped out of the picture.

== Style ==
Lincoln Barnett's text was written to appeal to a general public. The calculations and traditional proofs of geology and the other natural sciences are absent, barring some statistics derived from those sciences of the times. The text features numerous quotations from non-scientific literature, including the Bible. In addition, care was taken to minimize references to topics that may offend a religious audience. One reader remarked that the "text was written as if the clergy were looking over Mr. Barnett's shoulder and crossing out anything that might be in conflict with the story of Adam and Eve".

The style of the text is elaborate and dramatic, sometimes excessively so. As one reader put it, "[I] Enjoyed "Creatures of the Sea" most of all because of the way Lincoln Barnett slings the King's English around. While Nobel Prizer Sir Winston Churchill had an easier subject, he can't hold a candle to this guy Barnett". The rationale for mammalian dominance of the Earth from Ch. VI, for example, is presented in this way.

"Indeed, it is probable that the mammals may have survived and succeeded to hegemony of the earth not in spite of but by reason of their very weakness and obscurity, their smallness in a world dominated by giants, their nakedness in a world of armor plate -- in particular, by their fear and sensitivity and awareness in a world of unperceiving, insensate, brainless brutes."

There is also marked personification and some bias. Large prehistoric mammals, for instance, are variously described as being "awkward" or "witless". Tyrannosaurus rex in Ch. V does not escape this treatment either.

"The apogee of development was attained with the creation of Tyrannosaurus rex, the mightiest and most fearsome flesh-eater that ever terrorized the land. A towering agent of destruction, endowed with gigantic strength and power, Tyrannosaurus spanned 50 feet from nose to tail and carried his terrible head 18 to 20 feet above the ground. His hind legs were superbly muscled, from his thick thighs down to his three-toed, cruelly taloned feet. His main weapon of attack was his murderous mouth which had a gape of incredible size and was armed with rows of six-inch saberlike teeth."

On the other hand, the dense prose has also been praised as conveying awe at the natural world, with paleontologist George Olshevsky describing Lincoln Barnett's text as having "the grandeur of the universe contained in every word".

== Factual accuracy ==
Much of The World we Live In is and always was intentionally out of date, due to differences between the latest theories of modern physics, which are mainly incomprehensible to the general public, and the more popular theories of classical physics. This dichotomy of theory developed in the 20th century and continues today. Faced with it, Barnett chose the more classical theories for his presentation.

Barnett primarily offers the Newtonian universe. At the time of publication, his parts were up-to-date with contemporary theories on the natural world, but major scientific breakthroughs in astronomy, geology, and biology date the series. For instance, the sections on geology assume geophysical global cooling instead of plate tectonics to explain uplift. The paleontological parts (V and VI) are especially dated, considering the speed of new discoveries in the field and the dinosaur renaissance.

The frontier of research had already dissociated itself from the Newtonian universe in Barnett's time, in favor of the Einsteinian. Writing in the mid-20th century, he was well aware of this development. He copes briefly with Einstein in the last few pages of the last part as a special topic, but for the most part modern cosmology, quantum mechanics, and advanced particle physics are beyond his chosen classical subject matter. For example, Newton's gravity prevails, but its equivalent relativistic curved space-time is neglected. There is no force of gravity in the relativistic universe; however, it is acceptable to use the language of gravity with relativistic meanings.

The sections on various biomes such as the desert, rainforest, and woodland, which depend on more immediate observation, are still more or less accurate as far as they go, which today is more limited in reach. They reflect the ecology of the time. Neither Barnett nor any other writer had any hint of the massive changes to the biomes caused by climate change, such as the rapid melting of the polar ice caps, the bleaching of most of the world's coral, and the threat to the atmosphere's ozone layer, narrowly placed in abeyance by world collaborative action.

== Reception ==
"The World We Live In ought to be in book form. It is extraordinarily well done, comprehensive and at the same time comprehendible—a great thing."

—Roy Chapman Andrews

"To own The World We Live In in book form is a not-to-be-missed opportunity for any family—old or young, it's a wonderful and exciting adventure in learning."

—Walt Disney

The World We Live In, with its several incarnations, successfully brought the intricacies of science to the baby boom generation. By the time the book version was being published, endorsements were printed by notable people, including paleontologist Roy Chapman Andrews, filmmaker Walt Disney, and Admiral Richard E. Byrd. The "Letters to the Editors" page frequently featured glowing reviews of the series, as well as letters from creationists that either embraced or rejected it.

After publishing part XII on Mettler's Woods, LIFE received mail from the Citizens' Committee for the Preservation of Mettler's Woods, which congratulated them for the article and encouraged readers to help save the forest from destruction. Eventually, a letter from the Committee was published announcing that they had "raised to funds to purchase and study these woods and adjoining woodlands", adding that Life's article "not only stimulated several hundred persons to contribute to the fund to save one of the last primeval American forests, but encouraged the United Brotherhood of Carpenters and Joiners of America to contribute $75,000 in memory of W. L. Hutcheson". The forest was renamed the Hutcheson Memorial Forest.

Paleontologist Bob Bakker mentions Zallinger's dinosaurs as the spark that ignited his passion for prehistory; ironically, Bakker himself would later argue against Zallinger's rendition. George Olshevsky also cites The World We Live In as introducing him to science, and adds that he suggested authoring an updated version; however, LIFE's editors were not interested. The World We Live In was also the basis for a science series by the German comic book Mosaik.

== Legacy ==
The World We Live In was followed closely by The Epic of Man, in ten parts (all signed by Barnett) beginning with the November 7, 1955 issue, and ending with the May 6, 1957, issue. It focused on the development and history of human civilization, material that is usually covered under Physical Anthropology and Archaeology. The article format is the same: text by Barnett illustrated by many of the same artists and photographers. Panoramic fold-outs depict the ancient tribesmen carrying out their reconstructed cultural activities. These latter were duly compared to the activities of select modern tribesmen of the times. Ironically those ways were permanently altered by the exposure. The 1950s were times of great archaeological changes also, due to the multiplication of sites and discoveries. The magazine series finally presents the ancestors of modern Europe (Celts) and then ends abruptly, without a book edition for the time being. Notably missing from the series are the Far East and the Americas, where agriculture is now known to have been innovated independently.

After helping to produce the various editions of The World We Live In, Barnett went back to his true passion, natural history. From the June 30, 1958 to the October 19, 1959 issues, an eight-part series, The Wonders of Life on Earth traces the development of Darwin’s Theory of evolution, portraying the places and species that influenced his thought in eye-catching color photographs. The Wonders name only appears in the first issue. In that issue also and in all subsequent issues the name is Darwin’s World of Nature.

In those years great changes were being reported by LIFE, which seemed to be obsoleting the series articles as fast as they could be written. For example, the International Geophysical Year of 1957-1958 was duly planned and was duly reported in advance by a single article in LIFE Magazine. Data collected during this international research undertaking unexpectedly proved and resurrected Alfred Wegener's theory of continental drift, the foundation of today's plate tectonics in geology, yet the magazine mentions it no further. Articles on the Space Race were frequent, as well as individual scientific articles on various expeditions and wildlife. Barnett played no part in these, as he was not a regular employee of the magazine. One of its reporters in World War II, he had resigned in 1946 to pursue a career as an independent writer. He did his major writing for LIFE as an independent contractor, bringing the art staff with him.

In 1959, the handwriting appeared on the wall, so to speak, for LIFE Magazine. Circulation began to fall, due to competition with television, and fell even further in 1960. Barnett forged ahead with the book form of the Darwin series, returning to the title and concept of The Wonders of Life on Earth. Darwin seemed to him to be the true heir to classical science, investigating, like Aristotle and his students, the puzzling circumstances of nature. Unlike The World We Live in, the Wonders book’ rewrote and re-edited much of the magazine material. The first edition appeared in 1960 under the banner of Time, Inc., and was soon followed by others, including a special edition for young people by The Golden Press.

Time’s principal owner and co-founder, Henry Luce, moved in 1961 to restructure his holdings. LIFE Magazine was less successful, but Time Books was very successful. Luce took the advice of a new employee, Jerome (Jerry) Hardy, who had recently come to Time, Inc. from another publishing house. In 1959 he had launched a series of books, Time Capsules, containing extracts from Time with moderate success. In consultation with the LIFE editorial staff he proposed a new division that would publish series of books on specific topics. In 1961 Time Life was created under Hardy’s management. It joined the scientific research assets of LIFE with the book publishing assets of Time Inc. The magazine would now decline, but Time Life would rise to new heights.

Time Life was able to restore and improve many dropped projects from the archives of LIFE. One of the first was the single book based on Epic of Man. When it appeared in 1961 it was considerably different from the magazine articles. The WorldCat citation for APA lists Barnett as the author along with Time Life. The printed version ignores Barnett, citing the Editors of LIFE as the author and Time Incorporated as the publisher. The book itself is divided into 16 parts, not 10. China, the Maya, and the Incas have been added, as well as new material on Cultural Anthropology. Many of the parts correspond to the previous LIFE articles, but the names have been changed, and the material has been rewritten. Barnett has been listed as Senior Writer, and 9 other writers have been added, but none of the parts are signed.

From 1961 on, Time Life produced hundreds of books in dozens of series, typically about 20 books a series. The one that most closely emulates Barnett’s interest is perhaps the Life Nature Library some 24 volumes of natural history, 1961-1965, each expanding and updating some article or part of an article of "The World We Live In". For example, parallel to the article, "The Age of Mammals", is the book, The Mammals. The 25th volume is a series index. Barnett, however, does not appear in any of the 25, or in any other series. He has moved on to other books. In his place Time Life has recruited other notable writers and scientists in their fields, such as Willy Ley, Francis Clark Howell, and Niko Tinbergen.

== See also ==
- Time Life
- Life Nature Library
- Life Science Library
