= Rock Ledge (Norwalk, Connecticut) =

Historic house in Connecticut, United States

- U.S. National Register of Historic Places
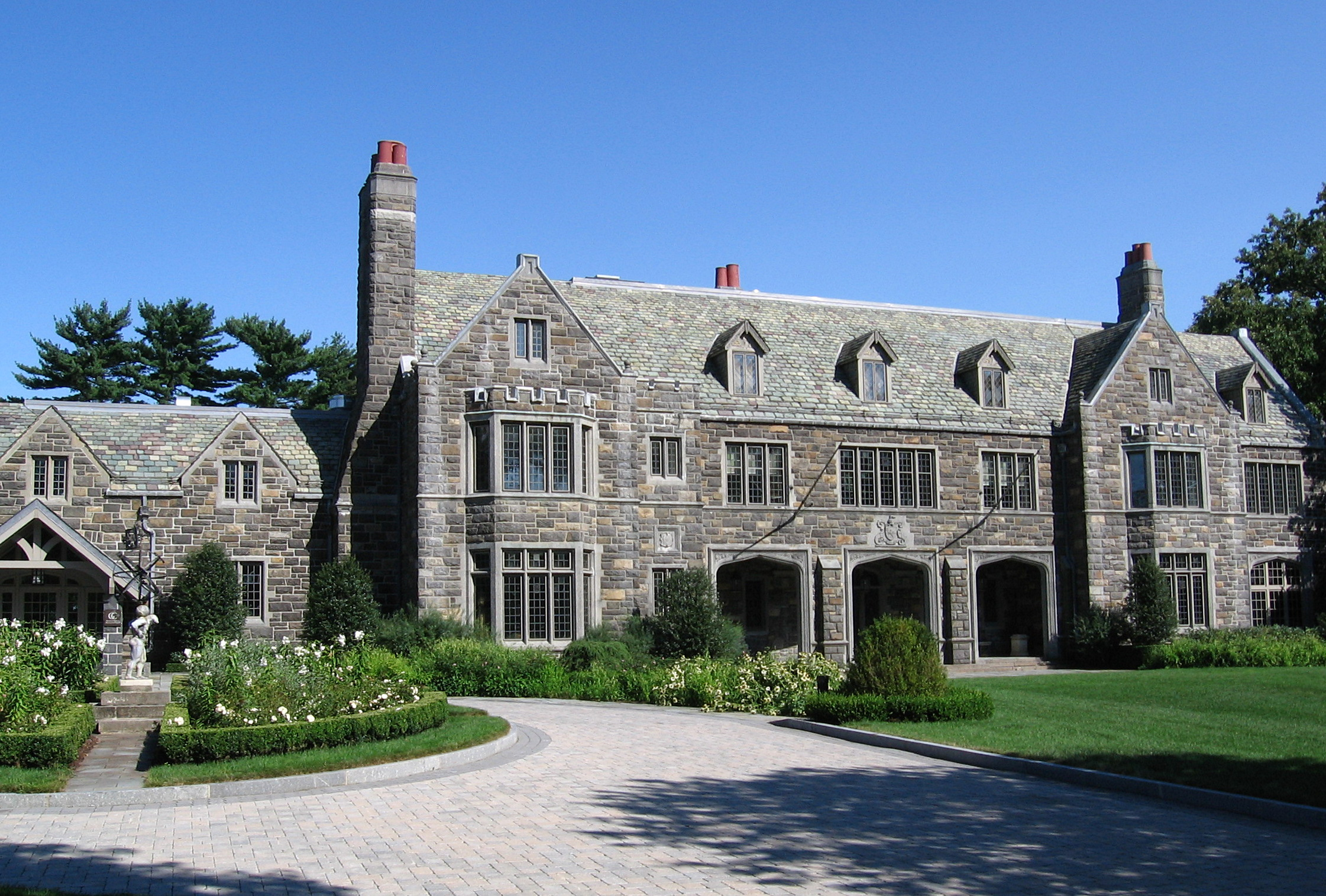

- Location within Connecticut Location within the United States
- Location: 33, 40-42 Highland Avenue, Norwalk, Connecticut
- Coordinates: 41°3′57″N 73°26′11″W
- Area: 21 acres (8.5 ha)
- Built: 1911
- Architect: Moeller, Edward; Et al.
- Architectural style: Tudor Revival, Jacobethan Revival
- NRHP reference No.: 77001394
- Added to NRHP: August 2, 1977

Rock Ledge is a historic estate on Highland Avenue in the Rowayton section of Norwalk, Connecticut. It was built in 1911–13 featuring Tudor Revival and Jacobethan Revival architecture. Edward Moeller designed the 1911 lodge, and Tracy Walker the 1913 main house, after the 1911 house burned down. The mansion belonged to a U.S. Steel executive. The property was listed on the National Register of Historic Places in 1977.

== History ==
In 1910, James A. Farrell, later president of the United States Steel Corporation, built a Tudor Revival mansion, which burned down in 1913 and was rebuilt in granite. The estate was later bought by the Sperry Rand Corporation, and it was on these grounds that the corporation developed the first business computer, known as the UNIVAC. Since 1966, the Farrell family stables have been converted to the Rowayton Community Center and the Rowayton Library. In 1964, part of the estate was purchased by the Thomas School for girls, a day and boarding school founded by Mabel Thomas in 1922. The school later merged with other private schools in the area, eventually becoming King Low Heywood Thomas in 1988. The school is now co-educational and located in Stamford, Connecticut. The mansion and attached office building was previously owned by Hewitt Associates. Currently, the main house of the estate is home to Graham Capital Management. Graham Capital Management purchased the historic Rock Ledge property at 40 Highland Avenue in the Rowayton area of Norwalk, Connecticut, which underwent renovations to become a financial center. The refurbishments were completed in December 2003, and the building was occupied in early 2004.

== See also ==
- National Register of Historic Places listings in Fairfield County, Connecticut
