= Peter Schwed =

Peter Schwed (1911–2003) was an American editor and the editorial chairman and a trade book publisher for Simon & Schuster. Among the authors he edited were P.G. Wodehouse, Irving Wallace, Harold Robbins, David McCullough and Cornelius Ryan. Schwed also authored or contributed to more than a dozen books. Schwed specialized in sports publications and was either an editor or ghostwriter for such sports figures as Jack Nicklaus, Rod Laver, Bill Tilden, Chris Evert, Bjorn Borg, Roger Angell and Ted Williams. He was the co-author of golfer Nancy Lopez's The Education of a Woman Golfer.

== Biography ==
=== Early life ===
Peter Schwed was born in New York and graduated from Lawrenceville School in Princeton, New Jersey. Schwed's father Frederick Schwed, was a member of the New York Curb Exchange (now known as NYSE). Schwed left Princeton University as a junior to support his family during the Great Depression. During World War II Schwed served in the Army where he saw combat in Europe and earned a Bronze Star for his service. He left the Military as a captain in 1945.

=== Career ===
After dropping out of Princeton University, Schwed joined the Provident Loan Society of New York. Schwed worked there for ten years and rose to be a vice-president at the firm which made loans on jewelry and valuables. Schwed wrote about his time there in the book God Bless the Pawnbrokers.

Schwed began his career at Simon & Schuster in 1945 after leaving the Army. Schwed began in the rights department and rose to executive editor and vice-president in 1957 when Dick Simon retired and Max Schuster and Leon Shimkin became equal partners over Simon & Schuster. Schwed became the publisher of the trade books division in 1966. He remained as publisher until 1972 and he retired as chairman emeritus of the editorial board in 1984.

Schwed's books spanned across fiction and non-fiction with a special interest in sports. Peter Schwed edited many notable authors including Cornelius Ryan, David McCullough, Harold Robbins, Irving Wallace, and P.G. Wodehouse. Schwed made annual trips to London for Simon & Schuster to meet with British authors and agents. His list spanned both fiction and non-fiction but Schwed was known to edit and ghost-write books by sports-figures including Bill Tilden, Bjorn Borg, Chris Evert, Jack Nicklaus, Rod Laver, Rodger Angell and Ted Williams. He co-authored Nancy Lopez's autobiography, The Education of a Woman Golfer.

In 1996, Schwed privately or self-published copies of his correspondence with author P.G. Wodehouse. He only printed 500 copies and said that there would be no further printings, unsold copies would be destroyed along with the film and plates.

Fellow editor Michael Korda, in his memoir Another Life, described Schwed as "deeply tanned, assertive, short, stocky, a fiercely competitive athlete whose passion was tennis.

=== Marriage and children ===
Peter Schwed was married to Antonia Holding Schwed, a novelist and enamelist and the daughter of the novelist Elisabeth Sanxay Holding, for 56 years and they had two daughters and two sons.

- Katharine H. Wood
- P. Gregory Schwed
- Laura S. Schwed
- Roger E. Schwed

Peter Schwed's brother Fred Schwed, Jr. was a humorist and former stock-broker who wrote the classic trading book, Where are the Customers' Yachts?

=== Death and afterward ===
Schwed died at 92 at Beth Israel North Hospital in Manhattan.

== Bibliography ==
- Schwed, Peter, and Herbert Warren Wind. Great Stories from the World of Sport. New York: Simon and Schuster, 1958. Print.
- Danzig, Allison, and Peter Schwed. The Fireside Book of Tennis. New York: Simon and Schuster, 1972. Print.
- Schwed, Peter. God Bless Pawnbrokers. New York: Dodd, Mead, 1975. Print.
- Schwed, Peter. Sinister Tennis: How to Play against and with Left-handers. Garden City, NY: Doubleday, 1975. Print.
- Schwed, Peter. The Serve and the Overhead Smash. Garden City, NY: Doubleday, 1976. Print.
- Lopez, Nancy, and Peter Schwed. The Education of a Woman Golfer. New York: Simon and Schuster, 1979. Print.
- Schwed, Peter. Hanging in There!: How to Resist Retirement from Life and Avoid Being Put out to Pasture. New York: Cornerstone Library, 1979. Print.
- Schwed, Peter. "WARMERDAM WAS IN CLASS BY HIMSELF." The New York Times. The New York Times, 12 Dec. 1981. Web. 21 May 2016.
- Schwed, Peter. Test Your Tennis I.Q.! Norwalk, CT: Golf Digest/Tennis, 1981. Print.
- Schwed, Peter. Turning the Pages: An Insider's Story of Simon & Schuster, 1924-1984. New York: Macmillan, 1984. Print.
- Schwed, Peter. Overtime: A 20th Century Sports Odyssey. New York: Beaufort, 1987. Print.
- Schwed, Peter. Quality Tennis after 50-- or 60-- or 70-- Or--. New York: St. Martin's, 1990. Print.
- Schwed, Peter, and Taylor Jones. How to Talk Tennis. New York: Galahad, 1996. Print.
- Wodehouse, P. G., and Peter Schwed. Plum to Peter: Letters of P.G. Wodehouse to His Editor Peter Schwed. New York, NY: P. Schwed, 1996. Print. (Rare: self-published by Schwed).
