= Peter Farb =

American linguist

- Born: July 25, 1929; New York City, United States
- Died: April 8, 1980 (aged 50); Boston, Massachusetts, United States
- Education: Vanderbilt University; Columbia University
- Occupations: Author; anthropologist; linguist; naturalist

Peter Farb (1929–1980) was an American author, anthropologist, linguist and naturalist.

== Biography ==
Farb was born July 25, 1929, in New York City to Solomon and Cecelia Farb. In 1950, he graduated magna cum laude from Vanderbilt University. He attended Columbia University graduate school from 1950 to 1951. He married museum director and painter Oriole Horch in 1953, and together they had two sons, Mark Daniel and Thomas Forest.

Peter Farb was a freelance writer in the areas of the natural and human sciences for many years, authoring many acclaimed books, including several books for young readers, and columns in national magazines such as Better Homes and Gardens and Reader's Digest. President John F. Kennedy's Secretary of the Interior, Stewart Udall, described him as "one of the finest conservation spokesmen of our period".

He was a Fellow of the American Association for the Advancement of Science.

Farb died from leukemia on April 8, 1980, in Boston, Massachusetts. At the time of his death, he had been working with Irven DeVore on a new book, The Human Experience: A Textbook of Anthropology.

== Dates of interest ==
1950–1952: Argosy Magazine feature editor

1960–1961: editor-in-chief of the publishing agent Panorama until the project sponsored by the Columbia Broadcasting System ended.

1964–1971: Curator for American Indian Cultures, Riverside Museum, New York, N.Y.

1971: National Book Awards Committee Judge

1971–1972: visiting lecturer, Yale University

1971–1978: Fellow of Calhoun College, Yale University

1976: University of Massachusetts Amherst Libraries Trustee

1966–1971: Consultant to the Smithsonian Institution, Washington D.C.

== Books ==
1. 1959: Living Earth
2. 1959: The Insect World
3. 1959: The Story of Butterflies and Other Insects (children's book)
4. 1961: The Story of Dams (children's book)
5. 1962: The Story of Life: Plants and Animals Through the Ages
6. 1962, 1977 (2nd Ed.): The Insects (Series: LIFE Nature Library)
7. 1963, 1979 (Revised Ed.): Ecology (Series: LIFE Nature Library)
8. 1964: The Face of North America (Young Reader's Edition)
9. 1964, 1978 (2nd Ed.): The Land and Wildlife of North America (Series: LIFE Nature Library)
10. 1964: Face of America: The Natural History of a Continent (selected for the Book of the Month Club and became extremely popular. Added to President John F. Kennedy's International White House Library, whereby President Kennedy presented it to the heads of a hundred foreign governments).
11. 1966: The Atlantic Shore: Human and Natural History from Long Island to Labrador by Peter Farb and John Hay
12. 1967: The Land, Wildlife, and Peoples of the Bible (children's book)
13. 1968: Man's Rise to Civilization As Shown by the Indians of North America from Primeval Times to the Coming of the Industrial State
14. 1970: Yankee Doodle
15. 1973: Word Play: What Happens when People Talk (selected for the Book of the Month Club) ISBN 0-679-73408-2.
16. 1978 (2nd Ed.): Man's Rise to Civilization: The Cultural Ascent of the Indians of North America
17. 1978: The Forest (Series: LIFE Science Library)
18. 1978: Humankind
19. 1980: Consuming Passions - The Anthropology of Eating by Peter Farb & George J. Armelagos
