= Bergamin =

Bergamin is a surname. Notable people with the surname include:

- Claudio Bergamin, Chilean/Italian fantasy artist
- Francisco Bergamín y García (1855–1937), Spanish lawyer, economist and politician
- José Bergamín (1895–1983), Spanish writer, essayist, poet and playwright
- Luciano Bergamin (born 1944), Italian clergyman and Roman Catholic Bishop of Nova Iguaçu in Brazil
- Massimo Bergamin (born 1964), Italian politician

== See also ==
- Bergamini
