= Japan's Imperial Conspiracy =

1971 book by David Bergamini

- Author: David Bergamini
- Language: English
- Subject: Internal Japanese politics before and during World War II
- Genre: History
- Publisher: Various
- Publication date: 1971
- Publication place: USA
- Media type: Hardcover

Japan's Imperial Conspiracy is a nonfiction historical work by David Bergamini. Its subject is the role of Japanese elites in promoting Japanese imperialism and the Greater East Asia Co-Prosperity Sphere; in particular, it examines the role of Crown Prince and Emperor Hirohito in the execution of Japan's Imperial conquest, and his role in postwar Japanese society.

Controversial upon its publication, as well as in the years since, Bergamini concludes that the conventional conclusion of historical analyses – that the Imperial household was largely powerless and not culpable or particularly supportive of the imperial adventures, blame for which is assigned to military elites – is mistaken. Instead, he asserts that the internal political fighting necessary to gain support for imperialism was a long-premeditated plan supported by all sectors of the elite and especially by members of the imperial family.

The reason given as to why the American occupiers provided immunity for Crown Prince Hirohito, and furthermore allowed for the continuation of the institution of the Emperor, is that its support was sought for the purposes of fighting Communism and the nearby Soviet Russia. Bergamini, born in Tokyo and fluent in Japanese, draws his conclusion from a variety of novel sources, but gives prominence to his interpretation of various diaries kept by involved figures.

Reviews by both participants in the war, war tribunals, as well as historians, range from effusive praise (e.g. from Australian lawyer and Chief Justice of the International Military Tribunal for the Far East William Webb, The Associated Press, and The New York Times) to outright condemnation (e.g. from British Japanologist Richard Storry and American military historian Alvin Coox).

== Social Troubles Institute ==
The Social Troubles Institute, Social Troubles Research Center or simply Colonization Academy, which Bergamini alleged was founded in 1921, was a think tank dedicated to future conquest plans on the Asian mainland, and their political implications. It had the patronage of Crown Prince Hirohito and was set up on land that had once been the Imperial Meteorological Observatory.

Bergamini describes the Institute as a secret indoctrination center (protected by extensive security measures) for select younger sons, of politicians, Japanese nobility and militarist supporters, who desired to participate in fulfilling the dreams of Imperial conquest harbored among elements of Japan's aristocracy. The first draft of Japanese conquest plans for world domination were traced by Bergamini to the institute.

According to Bergamini's theory, graduates of this ultrasecret 'political' think tank, recruited only by special invitation from rightwing circles, continued its 'political' and 'military' practice in the occupation zones in Manchuria. From this 'school' began the political and strategic debate between the Strike North Group (the Army group, pro-war against Soviet Siberia) and the Strike South Group (the Navy group concerned with the Chinese lands and especially Southeast Asia).

The Director and principal academic adviser was Shūmei Ōkawa, with Mitsuru Toyama another 'professor' in the center. Both were adherents to the Black Dragon Society. This center was closed in 1945 by the Allied authorities.

== Bibliography ==
- Bergamini, David (1971) [1971]. Japan's imperial conspiracy (Hardcover). New York: Morrow. pp. xxxviii, 1239 p. illus. 25 cm. LCCN 74102686.
- Bergamini, David (1971). Japan's imperial conspiracy (Hardcover). New York: Morrow. pp. 2 v. (xlvii, 1612 p.) : ill., 22 cm.
- Bergamini, David (1971) [1971]. Japan's imperial conspiracy (Hardcover). London, England: Heinemann. pp. xxxviii, 1239, [1] p., 18 plates. illus., maps, ports. 24 cm. ISBN 978-0-434-06690-2. LCCN 72176016.
- Bergamini, David (1972). Japan's imperial conspiracy (Hardcover). New York: Pocket Books. pp. xlii, 1364 p. illus., ports. 25 cm.
- Bergamini, David (1971) [1971]. Japan's imperial conspiracy (Hardcover). London, England: Panther. pp. xxxviii, 1213 p. : maps, 20 cm. ISBN 0-586-03842-6. (pbk.); (pbk.).
- Bergamini, David (2006) [1971]. Japan's imperial conspiracy: how Emperor Hirohito led Japan into war against the West (Hardcover). Lewiston, New York: Edwin Mellen Press. ISBN 0-7734-5894-8.
- Bergamini, David (1971) [1971]. Japan's imperial conspiracy (Hardcover). London, England: Heinemann. pp. xxxviii, 1081, [31] p. : ill., maps, 24 cm.
- Bergamini, David (1972) [1971]. Japan's imperial conspiracy (Hardcover). New York: Morrow. pp. XLII, 1364 p., [32] p. pl. : ill., 18 cm. LCCN 74102686.
- Bergamini, David (1972) [1971]. Japan's imperial conspiracy (Hardcover). London, England: Panther. pp. xxxviii, 1081, [29] p. : ill., maps, ports., geneal., 20 cm.
