= Rowayton, Connecticut =

Hamlet in Norwalk, Connecticut, US

Rowayton
- Neighborhood
- Village of Rowayton
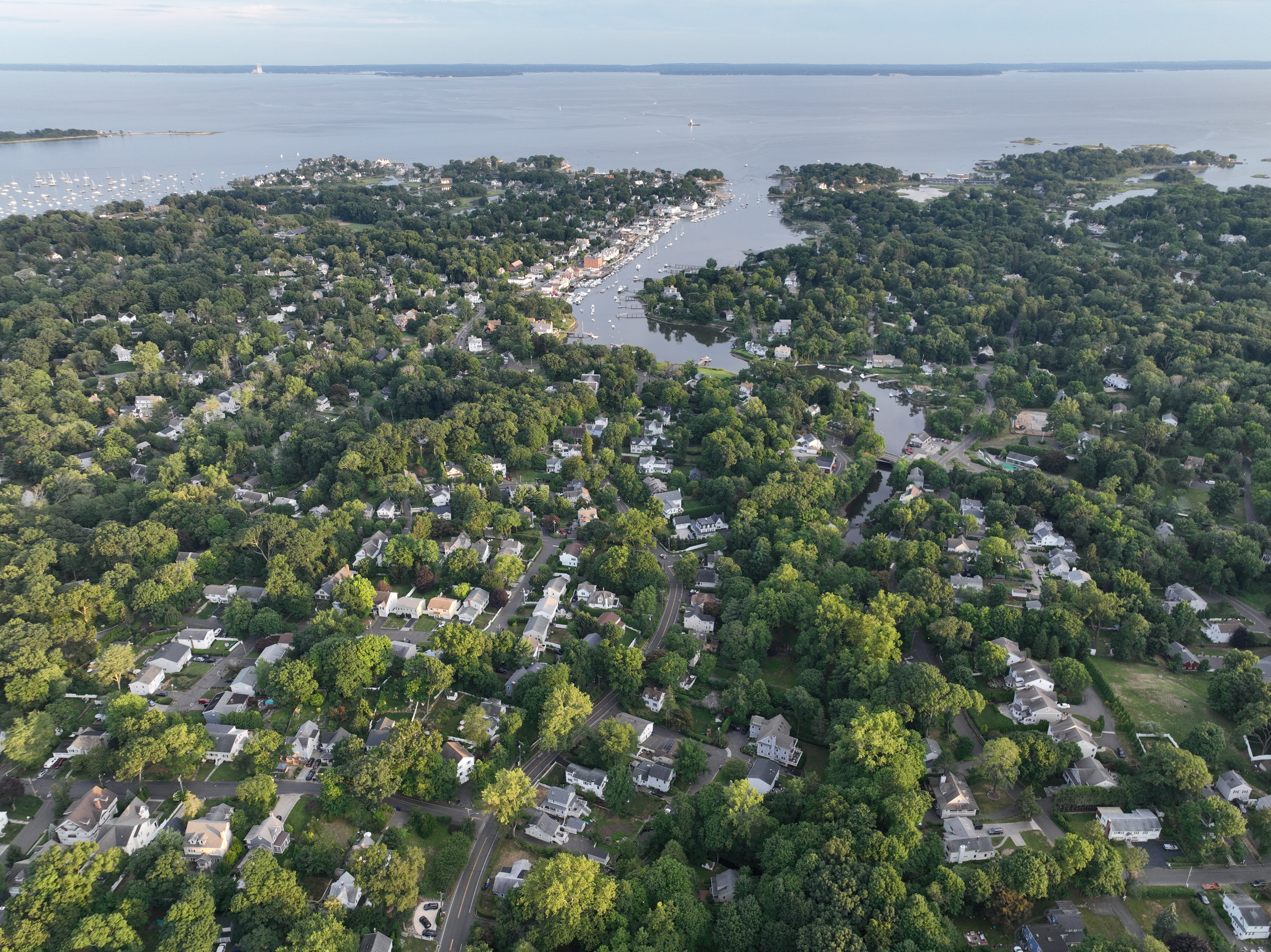
- Rowayton from above Rowayton Aerial
- Interactive map of Rowayton
- Coordinates: 41°03′50″N 73°26′11″W
- Country: United States
- State: Connecticut
- County: Fairfield
- City: Norwalk
- Time zone: UTC-5:00 (Eastern)
  - Summer (DST): UTC-4:00 (Eastern)
- Area codes: Area codes 203 and 475

Rowayton is a coastal neighborhood in the city of Norwalk, Connecticut, roughly 40 miles (64 km) from New York City. The community is governed by the Sixth Taxing District of Norwalk and has a number of active local associations, including the Civic Association, the Historical Society, the Rowayton Library, a Gardeners Club, and a Parents Exchange. Rowayton annually plays host to a Shakespearean production at Pinkney Park, produced by Shakespeare on the Sound, and also has an active community of artists, many of whom are associated with the Rowayton Arts Center.

The Rowayton station on the New Haven line of the Metro-North Railroad is located within the community, as is an elementary school, a public beach for residents and the Rowayton Public Library.

== Coastline ==
The Rowayton coastline has been a source of inspiration for centuries. John Frederick Kensett, a famous 19th century landscape painter of the Hudson School, frequently painted this seascape in his later life. This tradition has been carried on in an active local arts scene.

Rowayton is home to a number of private and semi-private beaches, three of which—The Roton Point Association, Bayley Beach, and a coastal outpost of Wee Burn Country Club—share a common history. In the early 20th century, the properties of all three made up the Roton Point Amusement Park. A boat landing attached to Sunset Rock, just to the West of Belle Island, allowed steam boats to bring day-trippers from New York City to the park. A trolley ran from both Darien and Norwalk, arriving at the Park via Highland Avenue and over present-day Langdon Preserve, located across from Farm Creek. At the amusement park, amenities included a bath house, a picnic grove, and rides ranging from the classic carousel to roller coasters with views of the beach.

== "Rock Ledge" estate ==
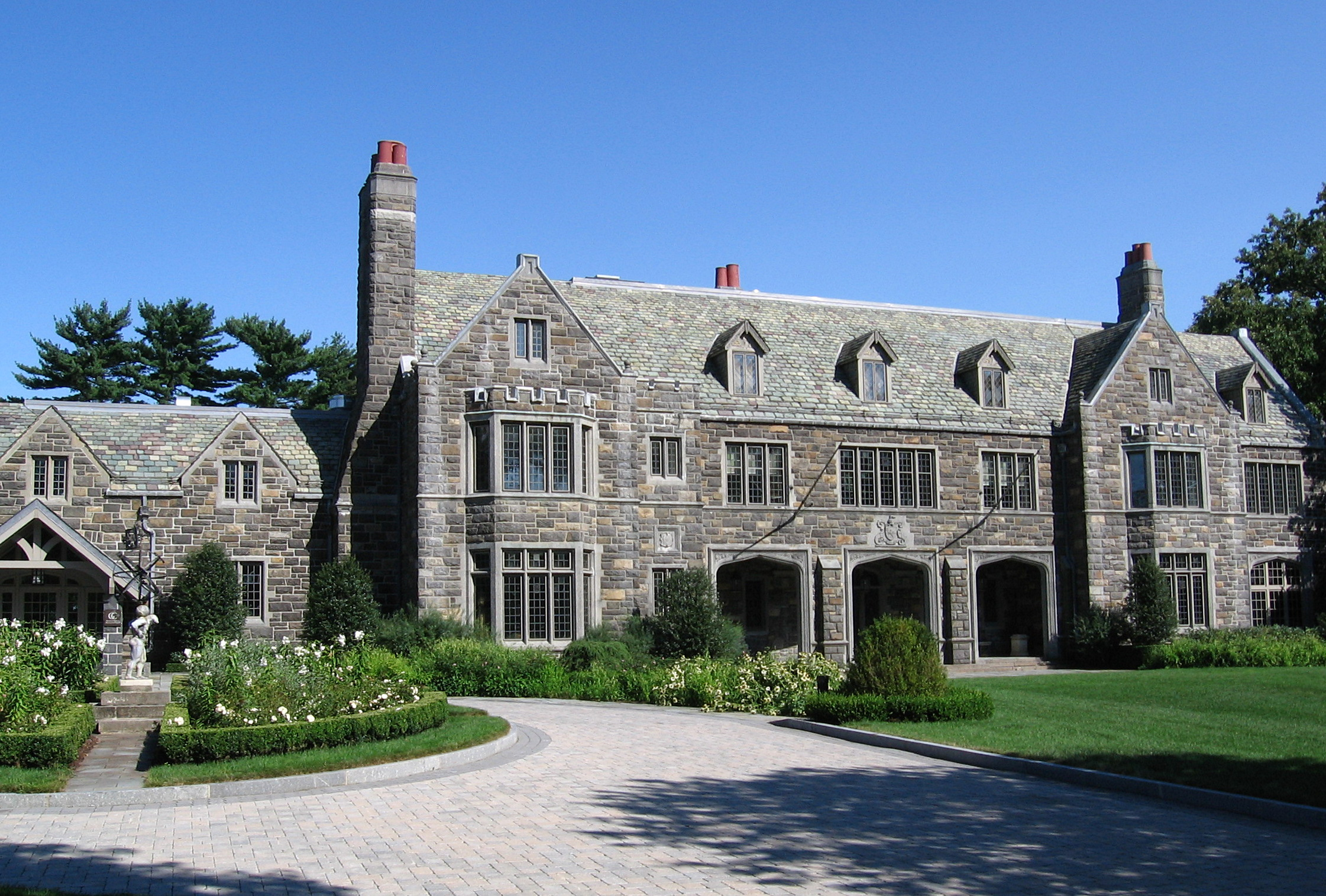
Rock Ledge estate

The former Rock Ledge estate at 33 and 40-42 Highland Avenue was added to the National Register of Historic Places in 1977. In 1910, James A. Farrell, later president of the United States Steel Corporation, built a Tudor Revival mansion, which burned down in 1913 and was rebuilt in granite. The estate was later bought by the Remington Rand Corporation, developers of the UNIVAC computer, of which General Douglas MacArthur was Chairman of the Board in the 1950s, and which merged with Sperry Corporation to form Sperry Rand. Since 1966, the Farrell family stables have been converted to the Rowayton Community Center and the Rowayton Library. In 1964, the main part of the estate was purchased by the Thomas School for girls, a day and boarding school founded by Mabel Thomas in 1922. The school eventually merged with another private school in Stamford, Connecticut, later becoming coeducational King Low Heywood Thomas. The mansion and attached office building were subsequently owned by Hewitt Associates. Currently, the main house of the estate is the headquarters of Graham Capital Management, L.P.

== Notable people ==
- George Abbott — Broadway and Hollywood producer/director/writer
- Jerome Beatty Jr. — author for the Saturday Review, Colliers, and Esquire
- David Bergamini — author of Japan's Imperial Conspiracy and Time-Life Books
- Richard Bissell — novelist, some of whose works were adapted to be Broadway musicals
- Kay Boyle — novelist and short story author, taught at Thomas School on Bluff Avenue
- Philip Caputo — author, A Rumor of War
- Brian Cashman — general manager of the New York Yankees
- Ward Chamberlin — PBS executive
- Leslie Charleson — TV actress
- Kathryn Hays — TV actress
- Helen Oakley Dance — writer and record producer
- Stanley Dance — writer and record producer, biographer of Duke Ellington
- Jimmy Ernst — artist and teacher
- Ian Falconer — children's book author, illustrator, and set/costume designer
- Jim Flora — commercial illustrator
- Meg Foster — actress
- Joseph Franckenstein — diplomat and teacher
- Robert Griffith — producer of Broadway shows
- Crockett Johnson — cartoonist and creator of children's books, Harold and the Purple Crayon
- John Frederick Kensett — nineteenth-century artist
- Ruth Krauss — author of children's books
- Emily Levine — humorist
- Albert Markov — violinist and composer
- Horace McMahon — actor and little league umpire
- Betsy Palmer — actress
- Gabor Peterdi — artist
- Andy Rooney — author, humorist, television commentator
- Emily Rooney — TV producer, journalist, and host
- Billy Rose — Ziegfeld impresario and theatrical showman, married to Fanny Brice
- Stefan Schnabel — Broadway, film and television actor
- Fred Schwed — humorist
- Treat Williams — film actor

== Gallery ==
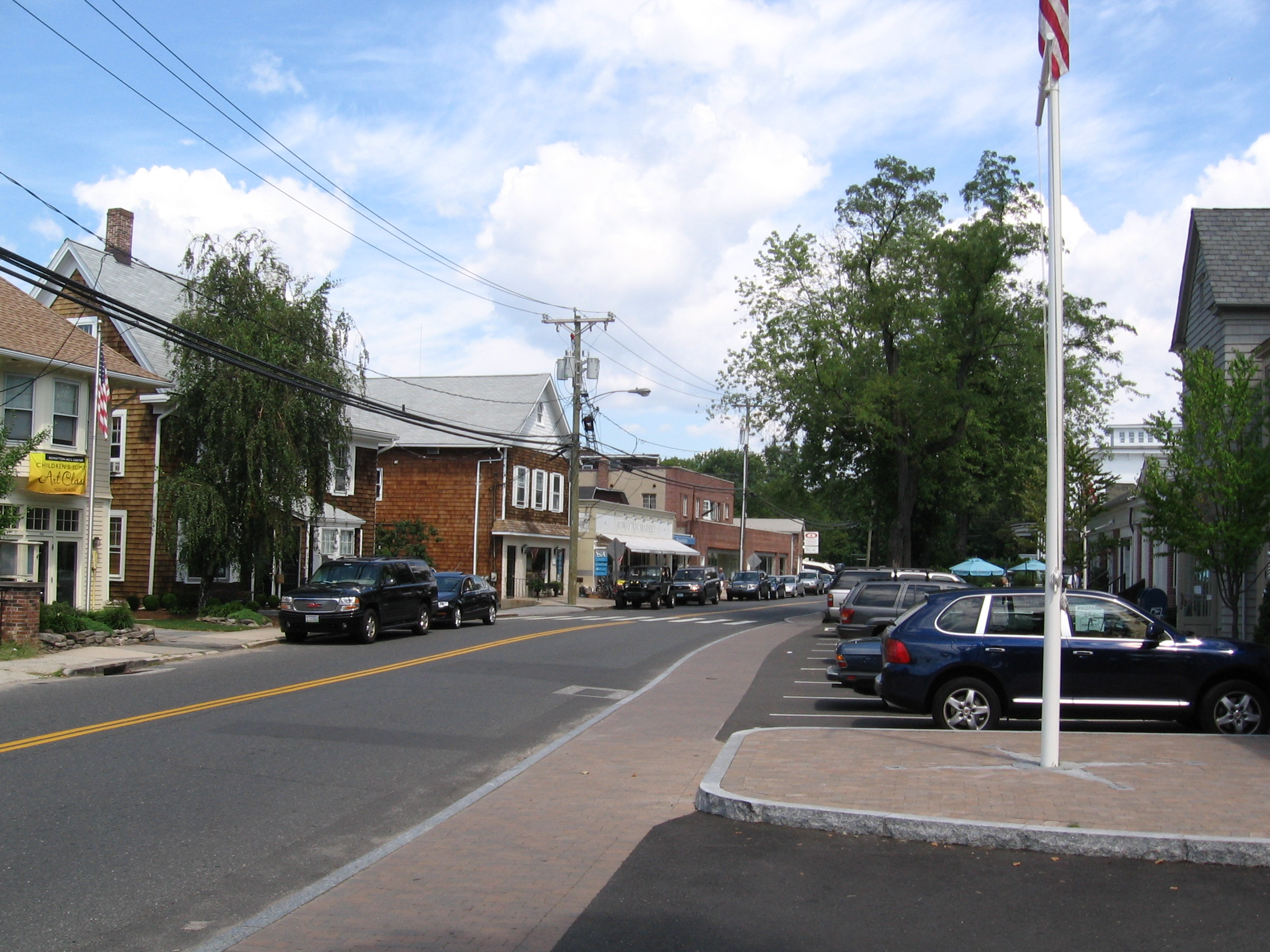
Rowayton Avenue

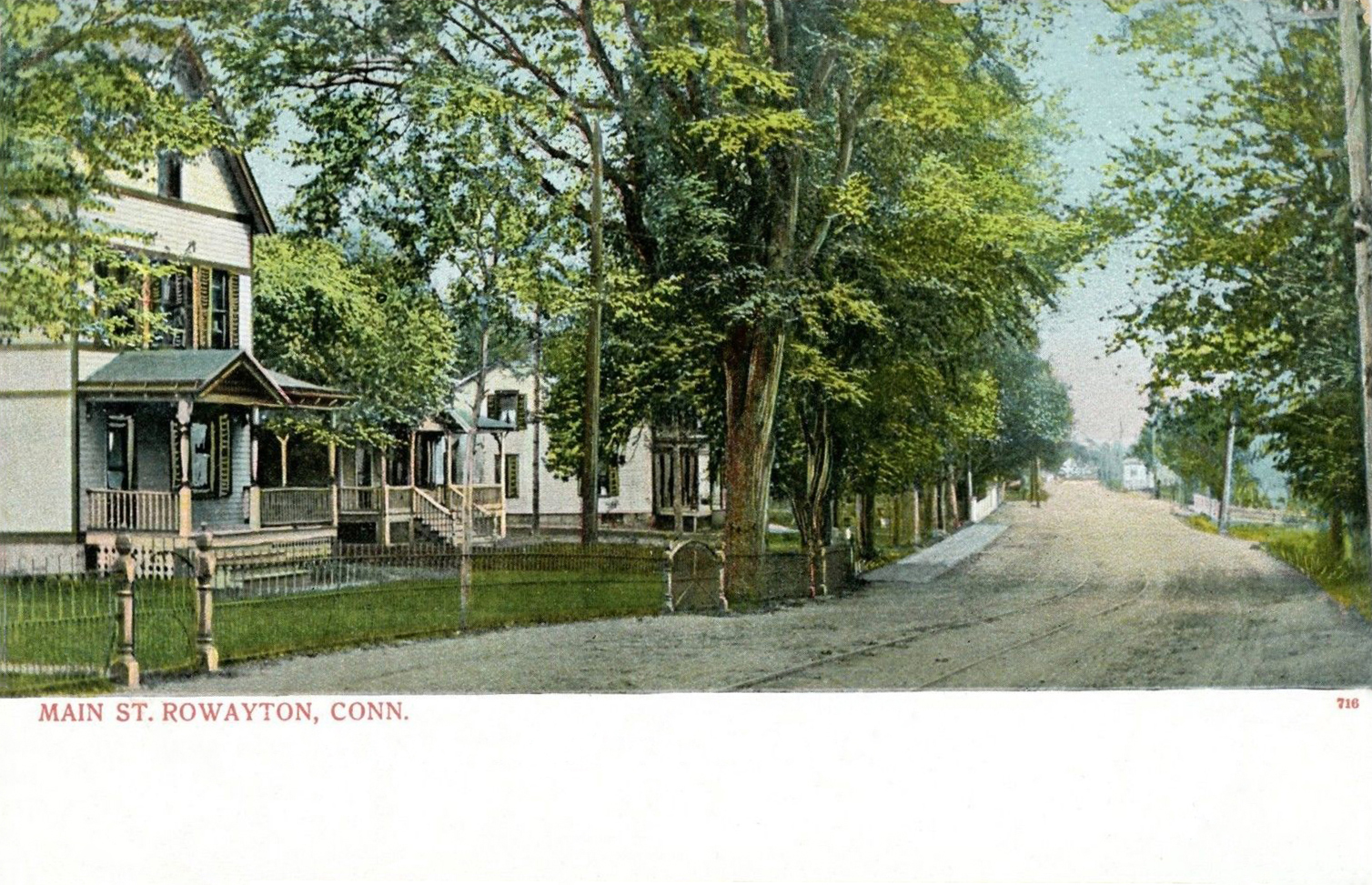
"Main Street" (Rowayton Avenue), circa 1906

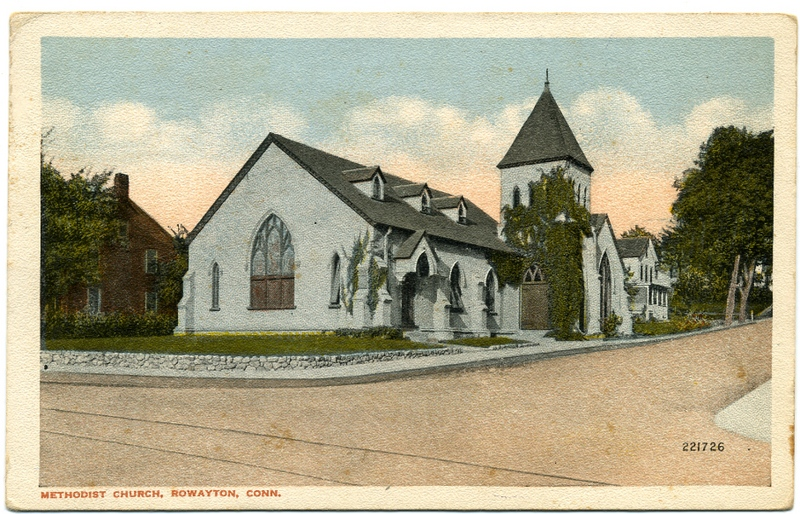
Methodist Church, 1917

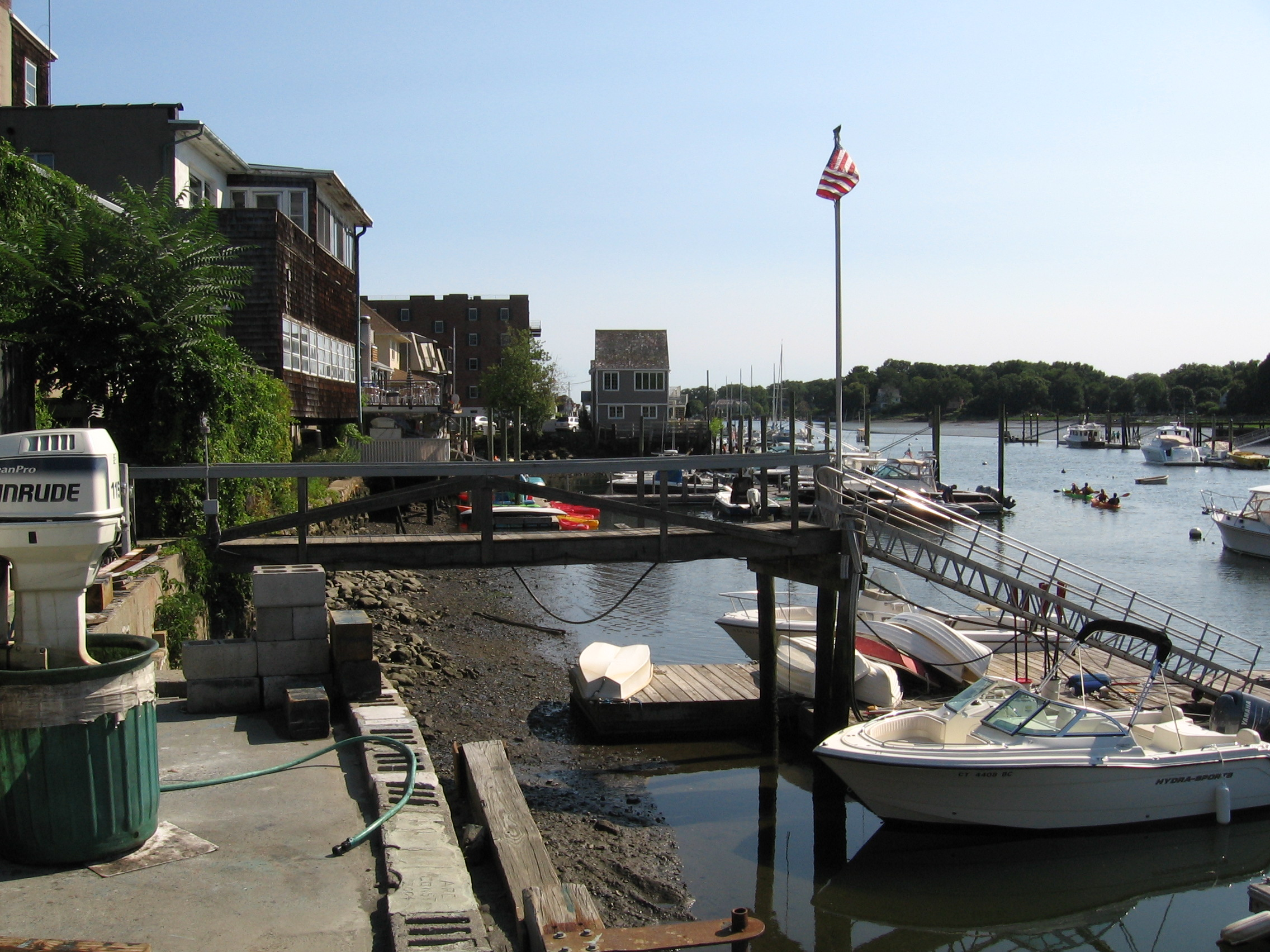
Riverfront, downtown Rowayton

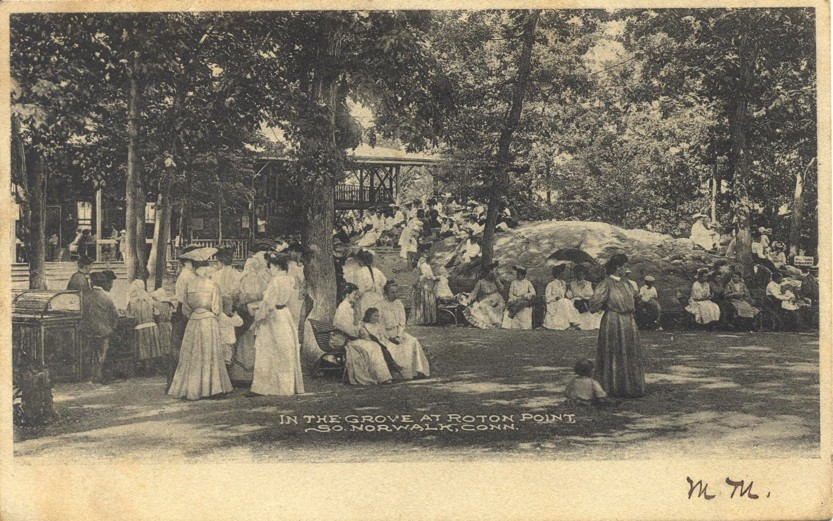
The Grove, Roton Point, 1905 postcard

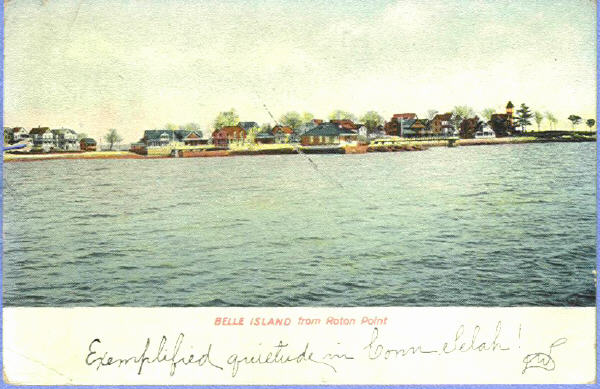
Belle Island, 1907 postcard

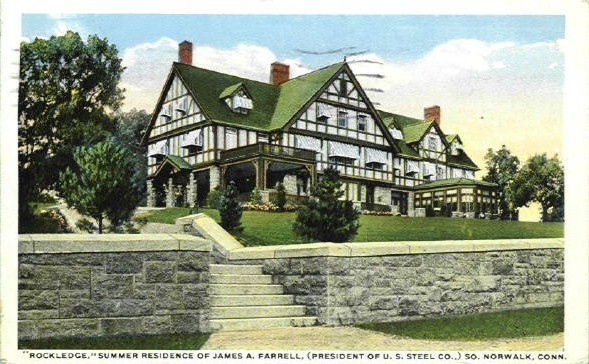
Original Tudor look of the Rockledge Estate
