= James Lewicki =

American artist & illustrator (1917–1979)

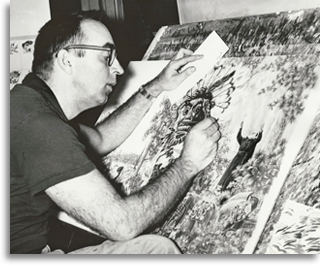
- James Lewicki at work in his Centerport Studio
- Born: James Lewicki; 13 December 1917; Buffalo, New York, United States
- Died: 12 December 1979 (aged 61); Centerport, New York
- Education: Albright Knox Art Gallery, College for Creative Studies, Detroit, Buffalo Technical High School
- Alma mater: Pratt Institute
- Known for: Illustration, Painting
- Spouse: Lillian Schalow (m. 1943)
- Website: http://jameslewicki.com/

James Lewicki (December 13, 1917 – December 12, 1979) was a 20th-century American artist and illustrator who worked for many magazines, including Life magazine. His book illustrations include The Life Treasury of American Folklore, The World We Live In (Life magazine), The Golden Bough written by Sir James Frazer and published by the Limited Editions Club and The Golden Book of Christmas Tales, written by his wife, Lillian. Lewicki also explored the Christmas theme in magazines and created cards for the American Artists Group.

== Life and works ==
=== Life history ===
Born on December 13, 1917, in Buffalo, New York, Lewik was the second child of Ukrainian immigrants was to Max and Alexandra Lewicki. His teachers recognized his talent from an early age and he went on to attend Buffalo Technical High School. He later attended the Albright–Knox Art Gallery, the Art School of the Detroit Society of Arts and Crafts (now College for Creative Studies), and Pratt Institute, where he graduated in illustration in 1939.

He married Lillian Schalow, also an illustration major at Pratt Institute, in 1943. She partnered with him on many projects throughout his career as researcher, draftsman, studio assistant and secretary. They had two children, Roy Lewicki and Lisa Lewicki Hermanson. They lived in Brooklyn, then Hollis, New York. In 1952 they moved to Centerport, New York where they built a house and studio.

In 1952 he sold Life Goes Camping with the Lewickis to Life magazine, and in the 1970s wrote and illustrated The Territory for Yankee (magazine), based on his experiences with a cherished vacation home in the woods of northern Vermont.

Lewicki enjoyed painting landscapes and sketching outdoors. He worked in watercolor up to the 1960s and later in acrylics. He exhibited annually with Audubon Artists and the American Watercolor Society and was a member of these two groups as well as Rotary International and the Society of Illustrators. Later, he did a series of graphite and pen drawings, as well as mixed media works in collage. Printmaking also became an outlet, producing etchings, monoprints, and working in dry lithography, a "green" process invented by his C.W. Post colleague, Harry Hoehn.

During the 1960s and 1970s, Lewicki became a professor, sharing his expertise with both graduate and undergraduate students in the Fine Arts Department of LIU Post (formerly known as the C.W. Post Campus of Long Island University).

== Illustration career ==
=== Early assignments ===
Lewicki completed his first book project while still at Pratt in 1939; From Village to Metropolis by R.W. Swan, a pictorial history of New York City from its early days as a Dutch settlement up through modern times.

Lewicki started to get work from Life magazine directly after Pratt. He created many works related to World War 2, such as Anatomy of Bombs. Lewicki also work The New York Times on short deadlines.

=== Christmas ===
In 1943, Lewicki entered a Christmas card competition to depict the Christmas message in a time of war, sponsored by the American Artists Group. His painting of a bombed church, with a large stained glass window of a Madonna and Child miraculously preserved, won second prize. He was asked to do a commission the following year. He drew inspiration from the Buffalo winters of his childhood, where a lighted paper star was paraded from house to house as carols were sung, following Ukrainian tradition. This led to a lifelong association with Christmas, starting with the series of cards, Christmas 'Round the World, also for American Artists Group. Additional research on the Christmas theme led to "The Customs of Christmas" for Life magazine.

Lewicki also made a rebus of The Night Before Christmas published by Hallmark Cards. Later on, he completed a pictorial essay for Life magazine – Christmas Legends. These paintings later appeared in book form published by Simon and Schuster as The Golden Book of Christmas Tales, with the stories written by Lillian. Lewicki continued to produce Christmas cards in a variety of decorative styles for American Artists Group through the 1960s.

=== The World We Live In ===
Lewicki's paintings were featured in Life magazine series, The World We Live In. Lewicki's illustrations of undersea life appears on the cover and in Part 2, Miracle of the Sea, published on February 9, 1953, in Part 4, The Canopy of Air, published on June 8, 1953, and in Part 5, The Pageant of Life, published on September 7, 1953.

After running successfully in Life, The World We Live In was released in book form in 1955, for which Lewicki did the cover art.

=== American folklore ===
While working on Christmas folklore, a neighbor commented to Lewicki that the United States had no strong tradition of folklore and cultural heritage. Lewicki went to the library to see if this was so, and found volumes to the contrary. He proposed the theme of folklore to Life magazine, and they asked for a presentation of 12 pages. Lewicki could not condense it down to one article, so he suggested a series, and the editors agreed. This assignment lasted for five years. Folklore from all over the country, representing the diverse cultures of Native Americans, early explorers, and immigrants were included, requiring background research. The final paintings were completed in a egg tempera style on gesso panel, preceded by multiple color studies and pencil sketches. American Folklore appeared in Life as a five-part series over a year and half, followed by the hard cover book, The Life Treasury of American Folklore, featuring additional paintings created just for the book. Lillian worked side by side with Lewicki during this time, assisting with research and studio support, including hand mixing the egg tempera paints for the gessoed panels and completing preparatory drawings.

=== Maps ===
Pictorial map making was also a staple of Lewicki’s repertoire, with Lillian assisting extensively. Examples include the poster The Fabulous Fifties, created for Time magazine in 1960, and resort and trail maps for the Stowe Ski Association, also from the sixties. Maps also appeared in Christmas themes tracing the journey of Mary and Joseph to Egypt.

=== The Golden Bough ===
In 1969 Lewicki completed a series of illustrations for The Golden Bough by Sir James Frazer, centered on the beliefs, customs and traditions of cultures from around the world. For this assignment Lewicki worked in a freer style, overlaying fine line drawings on abstract patterned fields of color, to suggest the mystery and mood of ancient and tribal rituals.

== Bibliography ==
=== Major book illustration projects ===
- Frazer, Sir James (1970). The Golden Bough. Limited Editions Club (see The Heritage Press).
- Turnbull, Agnes Sligh (1964). Little Christmas. The Riverside Press (now Riverside Publishing, a subsidiary of Houghton Mifflin Harcourt).
- Dolch, E. & M. (1964). Stories From Old Russia. Garrard Publishing Company.
- The Life Treasury of American Folklore (1960). Time Life.
- Miracle of the Sea – Evolution and The Atmosphere (1955). The World We Live In (Life magazine). Simon & Schuster, Inc.
- Lewicki, Lillian (1963). The Golden Book of Christmas Tales, Legends From Many Lands. Golden Press (now Western Publishing).
- Swan, Robert W. (1939). From Village to Metropolis. Grosset & Dunlap.

=== In the collections of ===
- Museum of Fine Arts, Boston – From Village to Metropolis 1939 original illustrations, book dummy, sketches and supporting letters
- The Lilly Library of Indiana University – Original paintings and research from the Life American Folklore magazine series and book
- La Jolla Map and Atlas Museum, La Jolla, California – Original paintings and printed pictorial maps for LIFE magazine, Stowe Ski Association, Map of Antarctica for Liberty magazine and others.
- The New York Public Library Main Branch – Stephen A. Schwarzman Building, Lionel Pincus and Princess Firyal Map Division – pictorial maps by Lewicki
- New Britain Museum of American Art – Miracle of the Sea cover painting for The World We Live In Life magazine series (Feb. 9, 1953)
- Society of Illustrators – Rip Van Winkle large pencil sketch from the Life American Folklore series
- Originally purchased by Clare Booth Luce – Christmas illustrations from The Golden Book of Christmas

=== In periodicals ===
Life magazine, Collier's, The Saturday Evening Post, The New York Times, Daily News Record, Look (American magazine), Woman’s Home Companion, House Beautiful, Liberty (general interest magazine), Redbook, Horizon (U.S. magazine), Pageant (magazine), Skyways, The American Weekly, The American Home, Holiday (magazine), Better Homes and Gardens (magazine), Flower Grower, Ski Magazine, Scientific American, Ford Times, Good Housekeeping, Smithsonian (magazine), Boys' Life, Christian Herald, Rotary International, The Lamp, Blue Book (magazine), Woman’s Day, Coronet (magazine), Reader’s Digest, Yankee (magazine) and others.

=== Book references ===
- Dunbier, Lonnie Pierson (Editor). The Artists' Bluebook: 34,000 North American Artists to March 2005. (AskART.com, Inc., 2005)
- Davenport, Ray. Davenport's Art Reference: The Gold Edition. 2005.
- The Illustrator in America, 1860-2000 The Society of Illustrators by Walter Reed (2001).
- Who's Who in American Art, 1564–1975, 3 volumes edited by Peter Falk
- Cohn, Jan. Covers of the Saturday Evening Post: Seventy Years of Outstanding Illustration.
- Dictionary of Signatures & Monograms by Peter Falk
- Opitz, Glenn B. (Editor), Mantle Fielding's Dictionary of American Painters, Sculptors & Engravers. 1986.
- Two Hundred Years of American Illustration from The Society of Illustrators by Henry Pitz (artwork by Albino Hinojosa).

=== Feature magazine articles ===
- American Artists Magazine – feature article, The Importance of Thorough Research. December 1962.
- North Light Magazine – feature article. Winter 1971.
- American Artists Magazine – feature article, collaboration with printmaker Harry Hoehn, demonstrating dry lithography, an innovative paper based process). January 1973.
