= Lincoln Barnett =

Editor and author

- Born: February 12, 1909; New York City
- Died: September 8, 1979 (aged 70); Plattsburgh, New York
- Education: B.A. Princeton University (1929); M.A. Columbia University (1933)
- Occupations: Editor, author
- Spouse: Hildegarde Barnett
- Children: 2
- Writing career
- Language: English
- Subject: Science
- Notable work: The World We Live In

Lincoln Kinnear Barnett (1909–1979) was an editor and author, most notably at Life magazine for many years.

Lincoln Barnett wrote a number of books, including The Universe and Doctor Einstein, The World We Live In, and The Treasure of Our Tongue.

The Universe and Doctor Einstein is a layman's introduction to the theory of relativity. It includes a foreword by Albert Einstein, and has been reprinted several times. His work popularizing science subjects included consulting work on the film Journey to the Center of the Earth.
