= Carlo Bergamini =

Carlo Bergamini may refer to:

- Carlo Bergamini (admiral) (1888–1943), World War II Italian admiral killed aboard the battleship Roma
- Carlo Bergamini (sculptor) (1868–1934), Italian sculptor and monumental mason

== See also ==
- Italian frigate Carlo Bergamini, several ships named in honour of the admiral
