= Life Nature Library =

Book series by Time Life

The Life Nature Library is a series of 25 hardbound books published by Time-Life between 1961 and 1965, with revisions to 1968. It has been translated from English into eight languages and sold in 90 countries. Each volume explores an important division of the natural world and is written for educated laymen by a primary author (or authors) "and the Editors of LIFE".

The 25 volumes:

- The Forest (1961; revised 1963), by Peter Farb
- The Sea (1961; revised 1963), by Leonard Engel
- The Desert (1961; revised 1962), by A. Starker Leopold
- The Mountains (1962; revised 1967), by Lorus J. Milne and Margery Milne
- Evolution (1962; revised 1964), by Ruth Moore
- The Poles (1962; revised 1968), by Willy Ley
- The Earth (1962; revised 1963), by Arthur Beiser
- The Universe (1962; revised 1966, 1967), by David Bergamini
- The Insects (1962), by Peter Farb
- The Birds (1963), by Roger Tory Peterson
- The Plants (1963; revised 1968), by Frits W. Went
- The Mammals (1963; revised 1967), by Richard Carrington
- The Fishes (1963; revised 1964), by F.D. Ommanney
- The Reptiles (1963), by Archie Carr
- Ecology (1963), by Peter Farb
- The Land and Wildlife of North America (1964; Revised 1966), by Peter Farb
- The Land and Wildlife of Africa (1964; revised 1967), by Archie Carr
- The Land and Wildlife of South America (1964; revised 1968), by Marston Bates
- The Land and Wildlife of Tropical Asia (1964), by S. Dillon Ripley
- The Land and Wildlife of Eurasia (1964; revised 1967), by François Bourlière
- The Land and Wildlife of Australia (1964; revised 1967), by David Bergamini
- Early Man (1965; revised 1968), by F. Clark Howell
- Animal Behavior (1965), by Niko Tinbergen
- The Primates (1965), by Sarel Eimerl and Irven DeVore
- A Guide to the Natural World and Index to the LIFE Nature Library (1965; revised 1967)

== Life Young Readers Library ==
Twelve titles from the Life Nature Library were abridged for a younger audience, and released under multiple editions between 1968 and 1979. They are credited to the primary authors of the original series. This series is variously referred to as the Life Young Readers Library, the Young Readers Library, or the Young Readers Nature Library. The 4th edition of the series numbered the books from 1–12.

The volumes in the Life Young Readers Library are:

- Animal Behavior
- The Birds
- The Desert
- Early Man
- The Earth
- Evolution
- The Fishes
- The Mammals
- The Primates
- The Reptiles
- The Sea
- The Universe

As they were published some time after the initial print run of the Life Nature Library, some revisions were made that reflected advances in scientific understanding. The Earth (1962), for example, dismisses Wegener's theory of continental drift as unsubstantiated; the Young Readers edition, on the other hand, refers to it as "the most widely accepted theory that accounts for the formation of the continents"

== Illustrated Library of Nature ==
The series was reissued in 1984 with some revisions and additions as the Illustrated Library of Nature. The Index was not part of this reissue.

== See also ==
- March of Progress (illustration)
- Life Science Library
- The World We Live In
