= Ralph Lapp =

American physicist

Ralph Eugene Lapp (August 24, 1917 – September 7, 2004) was an American physicist who participated in the Manhattan Project.

Lapp was an early advocate of civil defense. He attempted to demystify radiation.

== Biography ==
He was born in Buffalo, New York, and attended the University of Chicago. After completing his graduate studies at the university he joined the Manhattan Project and became the assistant director of the metallurgical laboratory. He then accepted a position with the War Department General Staff as a scientific advisor on atomic energy. When the research and development board was formed, Doctor Lapp became executive director of its committee on atomic energy. After this he acted as head of the Nuclear Physics branch of the Office of Naval Research. He wrote Nuclear Radiation Biology, A Nuclear Reference Manual, Must We Hide?, and assisted Doctor H.L. Andrews from the National Institute of Health in writing Nuclear Radiation Physics. He became an activist later in life and wrote a book, Victims of the Super Bomb (1957).

In his book The New Priesthood: The Scientific Elite and the Uses of Power, Lapp describes the increase in funding for science and the growing influence of scientists in American politics after the invention of the atomic bomb.

Lapp was interviewed by Mike Wallace in 1957.

In December 1971, he wrote a syndicated newspaper article titled "Problems in nuclear plumbing", discussing the threat of the "China Syndrome". (Note: This was not the first use of the expression, as it was mentioned in print at least as early as 1969.)

He died on September 7, 2004.

== Works ==
=== Specialist ===
- Lapp, Ralph E.; Andrews (1963). Nuclear Radiation Physics. Prentice-Hall Physics Series (3rd ed.). Prentice-Hall.
- AFSWP; Collective (1948). Radiological Defense (Vol. I - IV). Armed Forces Special Weapons Project.
  - Lapp contributed to Vol. 3. Note that the document is now considered obsolete. See also Glasstone's The Effects of Nuclear Weapons.

=== Non-fiction ===
- Must We Hide? (1949)
- The New Force: The Story of Atoms And People (1953)
- Atoms And People (1956)
- Radiation: What It Is And How It Affects You (1957)
- The Voyage of the Lucky Dragon (1958); Harper, New York
- Roads to Discovery (1960)
- Man and Space: The Next Decade (1961); Harper, New York
- Kill and Overkill (1962); Basic Books, New York
- Matter (1963); Series: Time-Life Science Library
- The New Priesthood: The Scientific Elite and The Uses of Power (1965)
- Arms Beyond Doubt: The Tyranny Of Weapons Technology (1970)
- My Life With Radiation: Hiroshima Plus Fifty Years (1995)
