= Graham Capital Management =

American investment firm

Graham Capital Management, L.P.

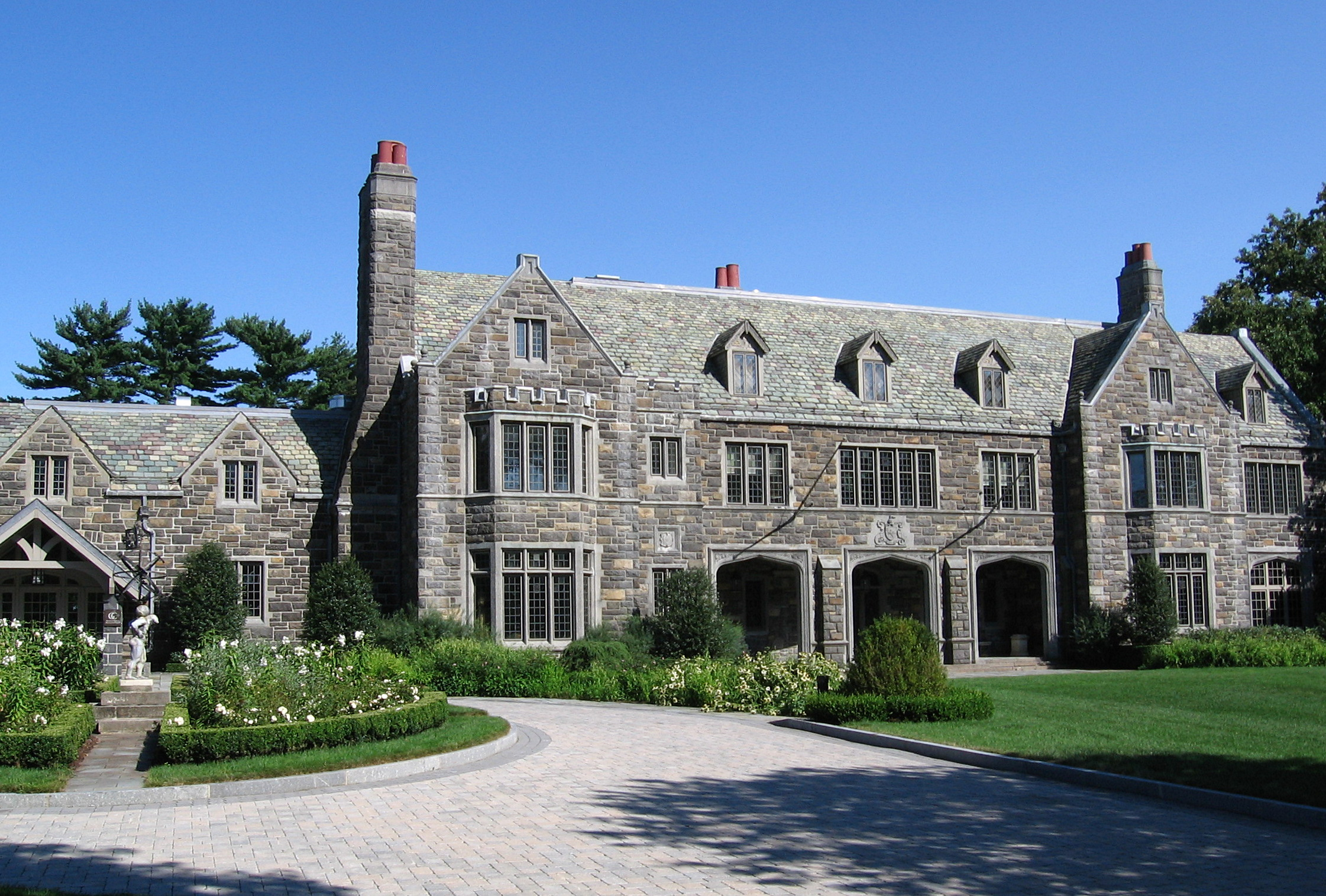
- Headquarters at Rock Ledge
- Type: Private
- Industry: Investment management
- Founded: July 1994; 32 years ago
- Founder: Kenneth Tropin
- Headquarters: Rowayton, Connecticut
- Products: Hedge funds Alternative investments Global macro Trend following
- AUM: US$22 billion (Aug 1, 2026)
- Number of employees: 260+ (Aug 1, 2026)
- Website: grahamcapital.com

Graham Capital Management (or simply Graham) is an American investment management firm headquartered in Rowayton, Connecticut. The firm has a focus on global macro and trend-following investing. It has additional offices in Florida and London.

== History ==
GCM was founded in July 1994 by Kenneth Tropin. Prior to this, Tropin was president and CEO of John W. Henry & Company, a commodities trading firm established by John W. Henry. In 1993, after Tropin parted ways with Henry, Paul Tudor Jones, a friend of Tropin encouraged him to start his own hedge fund and provided initial capital as a strategic investor. The early strategies were Systematic trend following.

In 1998, the firm began recruiting discretionary portfolio managers to diversify the firm's trading strategies. Then the firm launched Proprietary Matrix, a portfolio which provides broad exposure to Graham's quantitative finance and discretionary trading strategies.

In November 2007, Graham enhanced its risk management procedures and started holding daily risk management meetings which is still continued to this day.

In 2014, Graham launched its Graham Quant Macro strategy to clients.

In February 2025, Jens Foehrenbach joined the firm as President and Co-Chief Investment Officer (CIO). Former president Pablo Calderini was named Vice-Chairman and Co-CIO.
