= James Mourilyan Tanner =

British paediatric endocrinologist (1920–2010)

James Mourilyan Tanner FRCPsych FRCP
- Born: 1 August 1920; Camberley, Surrey, United Kingdom
- Died: 11 August 2010 (aged 90); Wellington, Somerset, United Kingdom
- Education: St Mary's Hospital Medical School; University of Pennsylvania
- Known for: Tanner scale and later experiments in using human growth hormone in children.
- Scientific career
- Fields: Paediatric Endocrinology
- Workplaces: St Thomas' Hospital; UCL Great Ormond Street Institute of Child Health

James Mourilyan Tanner (1 August 1920 – 11 August 2010) was a British paediatric endocrinologist who was best known for his development of the Tanner scale, which measures the stages of sexual development during puberty. He was a professor emeritus of the Institute of Child Health at the University of London.

== Biography ==
Tanner was born on 1 August 1920 in Camberley, Surrey, United Kingdom and was educated at Marlborough College and University College of the South West of England. His family travelled widely while he was a youth because his father, a soldier in the British Army, was stationed in various locations. Tanner was a top-ranked hurdler who might well have participated in the 1940 Summer Olympics which were to be held in London, but were cancelled after the outbreak of World War II. He decided to become a doctor and not follow his father into the military after his brother was killed early in the war. He attended St Mary's Hospital, London, under a scholarship in which he instructed fellow students in physical education. He went to the United States to complete his medical studies as part of a group of British students funded by a grant from the Rockefeller Foundation. He met his first wife, fellow physician Bernice Alture, while at the University of Pennsylvania School of Medicine and performed his internship at Johns Hopkins Hospital.

Tanner oversaw a study initiated by the British government at an orphanage in Harpenden starting in 1948. While the study had originally been planned to study the effects of malnutrition on children, Tanner charted and photographed the growth of the children in the study over a period of several years, developing the Tanner Scale, which measures sexual maturation in adolescents based on characteristics that can be objectively measured, including size of the genitals and the quantity of pubic hair. The data gathered led to the development of the modern growth chart, used by paediatricians around the world to monitor the pattern of growth in children through adolescence, with separate curves measuring the growth trajectory for boys and girls identified as maturing early, normal or late. Based on his research, Tanner noted that 90% of an individual child's adult height is based on genetic factors, but that the environment is the key factor when thousands of children are studied. By studying the growth characteristics of large populations, Tanner concluded that community-wide data on adult height was an indicator of how a society fosters its youths.

Tanner did early research on the use of human growth hormone to address children whose growth was significantly delayed and was responsible for selecting the small handful of children in the UK who would be treated with the limited supply of HGH extracted from human cadavers. After a number of patients worldwide died in 1985 of Creutzfeldt–Jakob disease linked to HGH treatments, Tanner immediately stopped the therapy, but had patients who insisted that they were willing to take the risk to address their child's delayed growth. Treatments resumed in the 1990s following the introduction of genetically engineered human growth hormone.

Tanner died at age 90 on 11 August 2010 in Wellington, Somerset, due to a stroke and prostate cancer. He was survived by his second wife, Gunilla, as well as by a daughter, Helen Phillips, a stepdaughter, a stepson and three granddaughters.

== Publications ==
Tanner authored and co-authored numerous publications and contributions to publications, some of which are listed below.

- Growth at Adolescence, 2nd ed. (1962) Oxford: Blackwell Scientific.
- Tanner, James M.; Taylor, Gordon Rattray (1965). Growth. Life Science Library. New York: TIME Inc. ISBN 9780632039302. OCLC 780951.
- J.M. Tanner; Frank Falkner, eds. (1979). Neurobiology and nutrition. Human Growth. Vol. 3. New York: Plenum Press. ISBN 0-306-34463-7.
- Harrison, G.A.; Tanner, J.M.; Pilbeam, D.R.; Baker, P.T., eds. (1988). "Section III – Human Growth and Constitution: Chapters 14–19". Human Biology: An Introduction to Human Evolution, Variation, Growth, and Adaptability (3rd ed.). Oxford: Oxford University Press. ISBN 0-19-854143-0.
- J.M. Tanner; M.A. Preece, eds. (1989). The physiology of human growth. Society for the Study of Human Biology Symposium 29. Cambridge (England); New York: Cambridge University Press. ISBN 0-521-34410-7. "Tanner growth." Transferred to digital printing 2002.
- Tanner, James M. (1990) [1978]. Foetus Into Man: Physical Growth from Conception to Maturity (Revised and enlarged ed.). Cambridge, MA: Harvard University Press. ISBN 978-0-674-30692-9. LCCN 89-19809. Transferred to digital printing 2003.
- Jones, Steve; Martin, Robert D.; Pilbeam, David R, eds. (1994). "Human growth and development". The Cambridge Encyclopedia of Human Evolution. Cambridge University Press. pp. 98–105. ISBN 0-521-46786-1.
- Stanley J. Ulijaszek; Francis E. Johnston; M. A. Preece, eds. (2000). "A brief history of the study of human growth; North American longitudinal growth studies; European longitudinal growth studies". The Cambridge encyclopedia of human growth and development. Cambridge: Cambridge University Press. pp. 2–18. ISBN 0-521-56046-2.
