= David Pilbeam =

American scientist (born 1940)

David Pilbeam (born 21 November 1940 in Brighton, Sussex, England) is the Henry Ford II Professor of the Social Sciences at Harvard University and curator of paleoanthropology at the Peabody Museum of Archaeology and Ethnology. He is a member of the National Academy of Sciences. He received his Ph.D. from Yale University.

== Biography ==
Pilbeam has produced numerous publications related to hominoid evolution since the mid-1960s, with some of his papers reprinted in later books.^{[a]}^{[o]}

In the 1970s, he was a co-discoverer, in the Potwar Plateau of Pakistan, of a nearly complete skull subsequently described as belonging to Sivapithecus indicus, an extinct Late Miocene great ape, on which he published several papers.^{[c]}^{[d]}^{[e]}^{[f]}^{[g]}^{[h]}

In 2005, in honour of his 65th birthday, Pilbeam’s students, colleagues, collaborators and friends assembled a collection to honour his work. Pilbeam himself later contributed to a paper honouring Ofer Bar-Yosef.

In the summer of 2007, Pilbeam was appointed the interim dean of Harvard College. He oversaw the continuing process of redesigning the undergraduate curriculum, as well as a large increase in financial aid to students and the planning of a housing renewal project. Pilbeam's decision to end the reimbursement of social events which provide alcohol was largely unpopular among students.

Pilbeam describes himself as "interested in a wide range of topics involving human and primate evolution". Among his most recent activities has been working with Michel Brunet and colleagues on the description and analysis of the new hominin from Chad, Sahelanthropus tchadensis.^{[i]}^{[k]}^{[l]} ^{[m]}^{[n]} He describes his long-term and continuing interests as including "the behavioral reconstruction and phylogenetic relationships of Miocene apes, which broadens to include more theoretical aspects of phylogenetics", and "the analysis of faunal change and its relationship to environmental change" particularly based on an extensive faunal record from the Neogene Siwalik Series of Pakistan. He also describes himself as having recently become interested in evolutionary developmental biology, and particularly in the development and evolution of the anthropoid axial skeleton.^{[j]}

== Honours ==
- International Prize (Fyssen Foundation), 1986
- Docteur Honoris Causa, Université de Poitiers, 2002
- Foreign Associate, National Academy of Sciences, 1992–1997
- Member, National Academy of Sciences (following naturalization), 1997–
- Fellow, American Academy of Arts and Sciences

== Publications ==
=== Papers ===
David Pilbeam has written and contributed to numerous papers, the bulk of which are listed below:

- Simons E L; Pilbeam D.R (1965), "Preliminary revision of the Dryopithecinae (Pongidae, Anthropoidea)", Folia Primatologica, 3 (2): 81–152, doi:10.1159/000155026, ISSN 0015-5713, PMID 5320325
- Pilbeam, D.R.; Simons, E.L (June 1965), "Some problems of hominid classification", American Scientist, 53: 237–259, PMID 14326961
- Pilbeam, D.R (1966), "Notes on Ramapithecus, the earliest known hominid, and Dryopithecus", American Journal of Physical Anthropology, 25 (1): 1–5, Bibcode:1966AJPA...25....1P, doi:10.1002/ajpa.1330250102, PMID 5338316
- Pilbeam, D.R (February 1967), "Man's earliest ancestors", Science Journal, 3: 47–53

a. Pilbeam, D (28 September 1968), "The earliest hominids", Nature, 219 (5161): 1335–8, Bibcode:1968Natur.219.1335P, doi:10.1038/2191335a0, ISSN 0028-0836, PMID 5678014, S2CID 4194361 (see 1987 reprint)^{[o]}

- Pilbeam D.R.; Walker. A.C (16 November 1968), "Fossil monkeys from the Miocene of Napak, Northeast Uganda", Nature, 220 (5168): 657–60, Bibcode:1968Natur.220..657P, doi:10.1038/220657a0, PMID 4972130, S2CID 4203365
- Pilbeam, D (14 June 1969), "Newly recognized mandible of Ramapithecus", Nature, 222 (5198): 1093–4, Bibcode:1969Natur.222.1093P, doi:10.1038/2221093a0, PMID 5815074, S2CID 4197907
- Elwyn L. Simons; David Pilbeam; Peter C. Ettel (10 October 1969), "Controversial Taxonomy of Fossil Hominids", Science, 166 (3902): 258–259, Bibcode:1969Sci...166..258S, doi:10.1126/science.166.3902.258, PMID 5809601
- Pilbeam, D (25 October 1969), "Early hominidae and cranial capacity", Nature, 224 (5217): 386, Bibcode:1969Natur.224..386P, doi:10.1038/224386a0, PMID 5343891, S2CID 4221575
- David R. Pilbeam (December 1969), "Tertiary Pongidae of East Africa: Evolutionary Relationships and Taxonomy" (PDF), Bulletin of the Peabody Museum of Natural History Yale University, 31: 1–185, ISSN 0079-032X, archived from the original (PDF) on 2010-06-27
- Pilbeam, D (7 February 1970), "Gigantopithecus and the origins of Hominidae", Nature, 225 (5232): 516–9, Bibcode:1970Natur.225..516P, doi:10.1038/225516a0, PMID 5460844, S2CID 4273945
- Pilbeam, D (15 August 1970), "Early hominids and cranial capacity (continued)", Nature, 227 (5259): 747–8, Bibcode:1970Natur.227..747P, doi:10.1038/227747b0, PMID 5432091, S2CID 4156046
- Simons, E.L.; Pilbeam, D. & Boyer, S.J (5 February 1971), "Appearance of Hipparion in the tertiary of the Siwalik hills of north India, Kashmir and west Pakistan", Nature, 229 (5284): 408–9, Bibcode:1971Natur.229..408S, doi:10.1038/229408a0, PMID 16059264, S2CID 4149488
- Pilbeam, D.R.; Simons, E.L (5 February 1971), "Humerus of Dryopithecus from Saint Gaudens, France", Nature, 229 (5284): 406–7, Bibcode:1971Natur.229..406P, doi:10.1038/229406a0, PMID 4926991, S2CID 953761
- Pilbeam, D (June 1972), "Adaptive response of hominids to their environment as ascertained by fossil evidence", Social Biology, 19 (2): 115–27, doi:10.1080/19485565.1972.9987977, PMID 4629892
- Snyder, D.R. & Pilbeam, D.R (1973), "The need for field-laboratory facilities for primate research", Journal of Medical Primatology, 2 (5): 257–66, doi:10.1159/000460333, PMID 4207403
- Pilbeam, D. & Gould, S.J (6 December 1974), "Size and scaling in human evolution", Science, 186 (4167): 892–901, Bibcode:1974Sci...186..892P, doi:10.1126/science.186.4167.892, PMID 4219964, S2CID 23346637
- Bell E.A.; Qureshi M.Y.; Charlwood B.V.; Pilbeam D.J.; Evans C.S (March 1976). "The Variability of Free Amino Acids and Related Compounds in Legume Seeds". Genetic Diversity in Plants. Vol. 8. pp. 397–412. doi:10.1007/978-1-4684-2886-5_35. ISBN 978-1-4684-2888-9. PMID 1032111.
- David Pilbeam; John Barry; Grant E. Meyer; S. M. Ibrahim Shah; M. H. L. Pickford; W. W. Bishop; Herbert Thomas & Louis L. Jacobs (1977), "Geology and palaeontology of Neogene strata of Pakistan", Nature, 270 (5639): 684–689, Bibcode:1977Natur.270..684P, doi:10.1038/270684a0, S2CID 4262214
- Gantt D.G; Pilbeam D; Steward G.P (16 December 1977), "Hominoid enamel prism patterns", Science, 198 (4322): 1155–7, Bibcode:1977Sci...198.1155G, doi:10.1126/science.412252, PMID 412252
- Pilbeam D; Meyer G.E; Badgley C; Rose M.D; Pickford M.H; Behrensmeyer A.K; Shah S.M (22–29 December 1977), "New hominoid primates from the Siwaliks of Pakistan and their bearing on hominoid evolution", Nature, 270 (5639): 689–95, Bibcode:1977Natur.270..689P, doi:10.1038/270689a0, PMID 413057, S2CID 4294476

c. Pilbeam, D.R.; A.K. Behrensmeyer; J.C. Barry; S.M. Ibrahim Shah, eds. (30 November 1979), "Miocene sediments and faunas of Pakistan" (PDF), Postilla, 179, ISSN 0079-4295, archived from the original (PDF) on 26 June 2010

d. Pilbeam, D.R.; M.D. Rose; C. Badgley & B. Lipschutz (30 November 1980), "Miocene hominoids from Pakistan" (PDF), Postilla, 181: 1–94, ISSN 0079-4295, archived from the original (PDF) on 27 June 2010

- Jacobs, Louis L. & Pilbeam, David (November 1980), "Of mice and men: Fossil-based divergence dates and molecular "clocks"", Journal of Human Evolution, 9 (7): 551–555, Bibcode:1980JHumE...9..551J, doi:10.1016/0047-2484(80)90062-7

e. David Pilbeam (21 January 1982), "New hominoid skull material from the Miocene of Pakistan", Nature, 295 (5846): 232–234, Bibcode:1982Natur.295..232P, doi:10.1038/295232a0, PMID 6799831, S2CID 7010601

- Pilbeam, D (March 1984), "The descent of hominoids and hominids", Scientific American, 250 (3): 84–96, Bibcode:1984SciAm.250c..84P, doi:10.1038/scientificamerican0384-84, PMID 6422549
- Vaisnys J.R; Lieberman D; Pilbeam D (September 1984), "An alternative method of estimating the cranial capacity of Olduvai Hominid 7", American Journal of Physical Anthropology, 65 (1): 71–81, Bibcode:1984AJPA...65...71V, doi:10.1002/ajpa.1330650110, PMID 6437236

f. Kelley J, Pilbeam D (1986), "Kenyan finds not early Miocene Sivapithecus", Nature, 321 (6069): 475–6, Bibcode:1986Natur.321..475K, doi:10.1038/321475c0, PMID 3086744, S2CID 4355067

g. David Pilbeam; Michael D. Rose; John C. Barry; S. M. Ibrahim Shah (15 November 1990), "New Sivapithecus humeri from Pakistan and the relationship of Sivapithecus and Pongo", Nature, 348 (6298): 237–239, Bibcode:1990Natur.348..237P, doi:10.1038/348237a0, PMID 2234091, S2CID 4047871

- Bar-Yosef O, Pilbeam D (2 December 1993), "Dating hominid remains", Nature, 366 (6454): 415, Bibcode:1993Natur.366..415B, doi:10.1038/366415a0, PMID 8247148, S2CID 4238068
- Brunet M; Beauvilain A; Coppens Y; Heintz E; Moutaye A.H; Pilbeam D (16 November 1995), "The first australopithecine 2,500 kilometres west of the Rift Valley (Chad)", Nature, 378 (6554): 273–5, Bibcode:1995Natur.378..273B, doi:10.1038/378273a0, PMID 7477344, S2CID 4365908
- Andrews P, Pilbeam D (11 January 1996), "Palaeoanthropology. The nature of the evidence", Nature, 379 (6561): 123–4, Bibcode:1996Natur.379..123A, doi:10.1038/379123a0, PMID 8538760, S2CID 4304266
- Pilbeam, D.R (February 1996), "Genetic and morphological records of the Hominoidea and hominid origins: A synthesis", Molecular Phylogenetics and Evolution, 5 (1): 155–168, Bibcode:1996MolPE...5..155P, doi:10.1006/mpev.1996.0010, PMID 8673283
- Daniel E. Lieberman; Bernard A. Wood; David R. Pilbeam (1996), "Homoplasy and early Homo: an analysis of the evolutionary relationships of H. habilis sensu stricto and H. rudolfensis" (PDF), Journal of Human Evolution, 30 (2): 97–120, Bibcode:1996JHumE..30...97L, doi:10.1006/jhev.1996.0008
- Daniel L. Gebo; Laura MacLatchy; Robert Kityo; Alan Deino; John Kingston; David Pilbeam (18 April 1997), "A Hominoid Genus from the Early Miocene of Uganda", Science, 276 (5311): 401–404, doi:10.1126/science.276.5311.401, PMID 9103195
- MacLatchy L, Gebo D, Kityo R, Pilbeam D (August 2000), "Postcranial functional morphology of Morotopithecus bishopi, with implications for the evolution of modern ape locomotion", Journal of Human Evolution, 39 (2): 159–83, Bibcode:2000JHumE..39..159M, doi:10.1006/jhev.2000.0407, PMID 10968927
- Pilbeam, D (26 September 2000), "Hominoid systematics: the soft evidence", Proceedings of the National Academy of Sciences, 97 (20): 10684–10686, Bibcode:2000PNAS...9710684P, doi:10.1073/pnas.210390497, PMC 34045, PMID 10995486
- John C. Barry; Michele E. Morgan; Lawrence J. Flynn; David Pilbeam; Anna K. Behrensmeyer; S. Mahmood Raza; Imran A. Khan; Catherine Badgley; Jason Hicks; Jay Kelley (April 2002), "Faunal and environmental change in the late Miocene Siwaliks of northern Pakistan", Paleobiology, 28 (sp3): 1–71, doi:10.1666/0094-8373(2002)28[1:FAECIT]2.0.CO;2, ISSN 0094-8373, S2CID 18408360

h. Madar SI, Rose MD, Kelley J, MacLatchy L, Pilbeam D (June 2002), "New Sivapithecus postcranial specimens from the Siwaliks of Pakistan", Journal of Human Evolution, 42 (6): 705–52, Bibcode:2002JHumE..42..705M, doi:10.1006/jhev.2002.0554, PMID 12069507

i. Brunet M, Guy F, Pilbeam D, et al. (11 July 2002), "A new hominid from the Upper Miocene of Chad, Central Africa" (PDF), Nature, 418 (6894): 145–51, Bibcode:2002Natur.418..145B, doi:10.1038/nature00879, PMID 12110880, S2CID 1316969

j. Pilbeam, D (May 15, 2004), "The anthropoid postcranial axial skeleton: comments on development, variation, and evolution", Journal of Experimental Zoology Part B: Molecular and Developmental Evolution, 302 (3): 241–267, Bibcode:2004JEZB..302..241P, doi:10.1002/jez.b.22, PMID 15211685, S2CID 15208691

- David Pilbeam; Nathan Young (July 2004), "Hominoid Evolution: Synthesizing Disparate Data", Comptes Rendus Palevol, 3 (4): 303–319, Bibcode:2004CRPal...3..305P, doi:10.1016/j.crpv.2004.01.006

k. Michel Brunet; Franck Guy; David Pilbeam; Daniel E. Lieberman; Andossa Likius, Hassane; T. Mackaye; Marcia S. Ponce de Leon; Christof P.E. Zollikofer & Patrick Vignaud (7 April 2005), "New material of the earliest hominid from the upper Miocene of Chad" (PDF), Nature, 434 (7034): 752–755, Bibcode:2005Natur.434..752B, doi:10.1038/nature03392, PMID 15815627, S2CID 3726177

l. Christof P.E. Zollikofer; Marcia S. Ponce de Leon; Daniel E. Lieberman; Franck Guy; David Pilbeam; Andossa Likius; Hassane, T. Mackaye; Patrick Vignaud & Michel Brunet (7 April 2005), "Virtual cranial reconstruction Sahelanthropus tchadensis" (PDF), Nature, 434 (7034): 755–759, Bibcode:2005Natur.434..755Z, doi:10.1038/nature03397, PMID 15815628, S2CID 4362525

m. Franck Guy; Daniel E. Lieberman; David Pilbeam; Marcia S. Ponce de Leon; Andossa Likius, Hassane; T. Mackaye; Patrick Vignaud; Christof P.E. Zollikofer & Michel Brunet (27 December 2005), "Morphological affinities of the Sahelanthropus tchadensis (Late Miocene hominid from Chad) cranium", Proceedings of the National Academy of Sciences of the United States of America, 102 (52): 18836–18841, Bibcode:2005PNAS..10218836G, doi:10.1073/pnas.0509564102, PMC 1323204, PMID 16380424 PDF fulltext Supporting Tables

n. Guy F, Lieberman D, Pilbeam D, Ponde de Leon M, Likius A, Mackaye H, Vignaud P, Zollikofer C, Brunet M (March 2006), "Morphological affinities of the Sahelanthropus tchadensis cranium: oldest representing of the human family]", Médecine/Sciences, 22 (3): 250–1, doi:10.1051/medsci/2006223250, PMID 16527204

- Smith CC; Morgan ME & Pilbeam, D (January 2010), "Isotopic ecology and dietary profiles of Liberian chimpanzees", Journal of Human Evolution, 58 (1): 43–55, Bibcode:2010JHumE..58...43S, doi:10.1016/j.jhevol.2009.08.001, PMID 19796791
- Desilva J.M; Morgan M.E; Barry J.C; Pilbeam D (February 2010), "A hominoid distal tibia from the Miocene of Pakistan", Journal of Human Evolution, 58 (2): 147–54, Bibcode:2010JHumE..58..147D, doi:10.1016/j.jhevol.2009.11.002, PMID 20036414

=== Books ===
Pilbeam also authored, co-authored, edited and contributed to (e.g. in forewords) books, with some key publications below.

- The Ascent of Man: An Introduction to Human Evolution, Macmillan Series in Physical Anthropology, New York: Macmillan, 1972, ISBN 978-0-02-395270-8
- Simons, E.L.; Pilbeam, D.R (1978), "Cenozoic Apes", in Maglio, V.J.; Cooke, H.B.S. (eds.), Evolution of African Mammals, Cambridge, Mass: Harvard University Press, pp. 120–146, ISBN 978-0-674-27075-6
- Ward, S. C.; Pilbeam, D (1983), "Maxillofacial morphology of Miocene hominoids from Africa and Indo-Pakistan", in Ciochon, R. L.; Corruccini, R. S (eds.), New Interpretations of Ape and Human Ancestry, New York: Plenum Press, pp. 211–238, ISBN 978-0-306-41072-7

o. Pilbeam, D.R (1987), "The earliest hominids", in Ciochon, Russell L.; Fleagle, John G (eds.), Primate Evolution and Human Origins, New York: Aldine de Gruyter, ISBN 978-0-202-01175-2 (Reprint of 1968 article in Nature).^{[a]}

- Pilbeam, D.R (1987), "Rethinking human origins", in Ciochon, Russell L.; Fleagle, John G (eds.), Primate Evolution and Human Origins, New York: Aldine de Gruyter, ISBN 978-0-202-01175-2
- Harrison, G.A; Tanner, J.M; Pilbeam, D.R & Baker, P.T. (1988), Human Biology: An Introduction to Human Evolution, Variation, Growth, and Adaptability (3rd ed.), Oxford University Press, ISBN 978-0-19-854143-1
- Jones, Steve; Martin, Robert D. (1994), The Cambridge Encyclopedia of Human evolution, Cambridge University Press, ISBN 978-0-521-46786-5
- Laura MacLatchy; David Pilbeam (1999), "Renewed research in the Ugandan Early Miocene", in Andrws, P.; Banham, P. (eds.), Late Cenozoic Environments and Hominid Evolution: a Tribute to Bill Bishop, London: Geological Society, pp. 15–25, ISBN 978-1-86239-036-2
- Pilbeam, D.R. & Young, N.M (2001), "Sivapithecus and hominoid evolution: some brief comments", in L de Bonis; G Koufos & P Andrews (eds.), Hominoid Evolution and Climatic Change in Europe, vol. Two: Phylogeny of the Neogene Hominoid Primates of Eurasia, Cambridge: Cambridge University Press, pp. 349–364, ISBN 978-0-521-66075-4
- Pilbeam D.R (2002). "Perspectives on the Miocene Hominoidea". In W. Hartwig (ed.). The Primate Fossil Record. Cambridge: Cambridge University Press. pp. 303–310. Bibcode:2002prfr.book.....H. ISBN 978-0-521-66315-1. Book review
