= John Van Wie Bergamini =

American architect

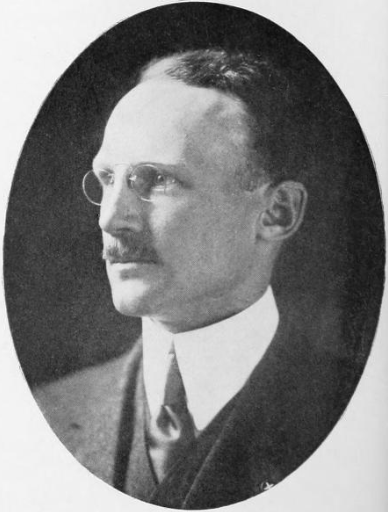
- Born: August 12, 1887; Athens, New York, US
- Died: January 15, 1975 (aged 87); Rowayton, Connecticut, US
- Education: Cooper Union; Columbia University; Ecole des Beaux-Arts; Yale University
- Occupation: Architect
- Spouse: Clara Dorothy Hawke (m. 1919)
- Children: 5, including David Bergamini

John Van Wie Bergamini (August 12, 1887 – January 15, 1975) was an American missionary architect who worked for the American Episcopal Mission in China, Japan, the Philippines and Africa.

== Early life and education ==
Born in Athens, New York on August 12, 1887, Bergamini studied first at the Cooper Union, between 1908 and 1911 at the Columbia University School of Architecture, and the Ecole des Beaux-Arts in Paris.

== Architectural career ==
In 1911 he was commissioned by the Congregational Church to design and build a two-story brick mission hospital in Shanxi, China. He stayed in China until 1920 when he was appointed official architect of the Episcopal Church in the Far East. During his architectural career he was credited with the design of over 200 churches, hospitals, schools and residential structures in China, Japan, the Philippines, Liberia, Mexico and the United States.

His 1929 membership for the New York Chapter of the American Institute of Architects was sponsored by Antonin Raymond, Robert D. Kohn and Samuel Bishop. Bergamini obtained a Bachelor of Fine Arts degree at Yale University in 1934

Bergamini was active in Hankou, China, where in advance of Japanese air raids in 1937 he supervised construction of air raid shelters at St. Hilda's School for Girls. He was interned with his family in Baguio, Luzon as a prisoner of war during the Japanese occupation of the Philippines.

He died in Stamford Hospital, Stamford, Connecticut, on January 15, 1975.

== Family ==
Bergamini married Clara Dorothy Hawke in 1919. He was the father of five children, including American historian and author David Bergamini.

== Notable buildings ==
Principal works include:

- St. Margaret's School, Tokyo (1932), chapel and school facilities.
- St. Luke's International Hospital, Tokyo (1933) main building. Chapel interior succeeding the work of Antonin Raymond
- The National Cathedral and Collegiate Church of St. Mary and St. John in Quezon City.
