= Life Science Library =

Book series

The Life Science Library is a series of hardbound books published by Time Life between 1963 and 1967. Each of the 26 volumes explores a major topic of the natural sciences at a level appropriate to an educated lay readership. In each volume, the text of each of eight chapters is followed by a "Picture Essay" illustrating the subject of the preceding chapter. They were available in a monthly subscription from Life magazine. The series explains scientific concepts in simple metaphors; for example, Albert Einstein's theory of relativity is explained in a cartoon about a spy drama involving a train traveling very close to the speed of light, probability is explained with poker hands, and the periodic table of the elements is conveyed with common household items. Although progress has overtaken much of the material in the more than 50 years since their publication, the series' explanations of basic science and the history of discovery remain valid. The consulting editors of the series are microbiologist René Dubos, physicist Henry Margenau, and physicist and novelist C. P. Snow.

Each volume was written by a primary author or authors, "and the Editors of LIFE". The volumes are:

- Matter (1963), by Ralph E. Lapp
- Energy (1963), by Mitchell Wilson
- Mathematics (1963), by David Bergamini
- The Body (1964), by Alan E. Nourse
- The Cell (1964), by John E. Pfeiffer
- The Scientist (1964), by Henry Margenau and David Bergamini
- Machines (1964), by Robert O'Brien
- Man and Space (1964), by Arthur C. Clarke
- The Mind (1964), by John Rowan Wilson
- Sound and Hearing (1965), by S. S. Stevens and Fred Warshofsky
- Ships (1965), by Edward V. Lewis and Robert O'Brien
- Flight (1965), by H. Guyford Stever and James J. Haggerty
- Growth (1965), by James M. Tanner and Gordon Rattray Taylor
- Health and Disease (1965), by René Dubos and Maya Pines
- Weather (1965), by Philip D. Thompson and Robert O'Brien
- Planets (1966), by Carl Sagan and Jonathan Norton Leonard
- The Engineer (1966), by C.C. Furnas and Joe McCarthy
- Time (1966), by Samuel A. Goudsmit and Robert Claiborne
- Water (1966), by Luna B. Leopold and Kenneth S. Davis
- Giant Molecules (1966), by Herman F. Mark
- Light and Vision (1966), by Conrad G. Mueller and Mae Rudolph
- Food and Nutrition (1967), by William H. Sebrell, Jr and James J. Haggerty
- The Physician (1967), by Russel V. Lee and Sarel Eimerl
- Drugs (1967), by Walter Modell and Alfred Lansing
- Wheels (1967), by Ezra Bowen
- A Guide to Science and Index to the LIFE Science Library (1967)

== See also ==
- Life Nature Library
