= Donato Bergamini =

Italian footballer (1962-1989)

Personal information
- Height: 5 ft 7 in (1.70 m)
- Position: Midfielder

Denis Bergamini, born Donato Bergamini (Argenta, 18 September 1962 – Roseto Capo Spulico, 18 November 1989), was an Italian football player who played as a midfielder.

After starting his career in the lower leagues, he had his best professional spell with Cosenza, with whom he achieved promotion to Serie B.

His fame, posthumous, is due to the controversy over his death, initially attributed to suicide when his body was found on the State Road 106 near a town on the Ionian Sea. This reconstruction of the facts was never considered plausible by family members, investigative journalists and colleagues (such as former football players Michele Padovano, his friend and at the time teammate in Calabria, and Carlo Petrini, author of a book about his story). In November 2017, 28 years after the fact, a new expert opinion ordered by the Castrovillari court attributed the football player's death is caused by suffocation/strangulation; following this expert opinion, his ex-girlfriend and the driver of the truck under whose wheels the football player ended up were registered as suspects. Four years later, the trial began.

== Early life ==
He began his soccer career in the 1982-1983 season wearing the Imola jersey in Interregionale. The following year he played in Russi (always in Interregionale) where he remained for two seasons.

In 1985 he was bought by Cosenza, a Serie C1 club with which he would play for 5 seasons. In his first championship in the red and blue jersey he made 24 appearances without scoring a goal. The following year he played 28 games and scored 2 "important" goals (against Sorrento and Benevento) that gave his team the victory. In 1987-1988 Cosenza won the Serie C1 championship and returned to Serie B after a 24-year absence. Bergamini was a starter in Gianni Di Marzio's team, playing 32 of 34 games. On 11 September 1988 he made his debut in Serie B in the Cosenza-Genoa match (0-0). In that season, perhaps the best in the history of Cosenza (coached by Bruno Giorgi), he also scored his first and only goal in Serie B, in the Cosenza-Licata match (2-0).

Due to an injury he only managed to play 16 games, but at the end of the season he has several requests on the market. Parma does everything to sign him, but Cosenza wants to play a top championship and declares him unsellable, confirming him for another season, the last of his career.

=== Death ===
On November 18, 1989, Bergamini was found dead on the state road 106 Jonica near Roseto Capo Spulico in the province of Cosenza. At the time, his death seemed to have occurred by suicide: in fact, according to witnesses, Bergamini threw himself between the wheels of a truck that dragged him for about 60 meters. The investigation was closed and, twenty years later, the suicide hypothesis has never been considered credible (neither by family members, nor by fans, nor by teammates): the body did not present any wounds compatible with this version and was not covered in mud, despite the rain and puddles present at the site of the accident.

He played his last match on November 12, 1989: Monza-Cosenza 1-1, with a rossoblù goal by Michele Padovano, his great friend who, after his death, wore Bergamini's number 8 shirt in the Cosenza-Messina match (2-0) on November 19, with which Padovano himself scored the first goal, dedicating it to his teammate who had died the day before. Today the south curve of the Gigi Marulla stadium bears his name, while a bust depicting him is preserved inside the locker rooms.

=== The investigations ===
Former Roma and Milan soccer player Carlo Petrini tried to shed light on the mysterious death by writing the book "Il calciatore suicidato" (English: The soccer player who was suicided) in 2001, in which he provided some details on the soccer player's story (facts that were never proven): according to him, the underworld was pushing to fix matches and Bergamini, a clean athlete and leader of the locker room, had opposed the pressure.

On December 27, 2009, the "Bergamini Day" was celebrated in Cosenza, organized by the "Cosenza United" Forum and the Ultrà Cosenza, which was also attended by the soccer player's family. The purpose of this demonstration was to ask for truth and justice on the death of the rossoblù idol and to reopen the investigation, which at the time of the facts was filed too quickly as "suicide" despite the numerous question marks and unconvincing evidence. According to the family and the Cosenza fans, Bergamini was killed, so about 300 people marched through the streets of the city asking for clarity on his disappearance. On 6 August 2010, the conference "Truth for Bergamini" was held in Aiello Calabro, while on 27 December 2010, the "Bergamini Day" was renewed for the second year, held at the Morelli theatre in Cosenza. On 14 June 2011, a request was made to reopen the investigation to be classified as voluntary homicide. On 29 June 2011, the Castrovillari prosecutor's office officially reopened the investigations by virtue of new evidence.

On 22 February 2012, the RIS of Messina filed their expert report with the Public Prosecutor's Office of Castrovillari, according to which, when he was hit, Bergamini was already dead. The RIS were in fact able to ascertain, through various simulations, that if the young footballer had "thrown himself like a fish" under the truck, as his girlfriend reported, his shoes, his necklace and his watch would have suffered serious damage, and instead at the time the body was found they were almost intact. An expert report, dated 1990 and signed by Professor Francesco Maria Avato, was confirmed by the findings that the Castrovillari Public Prosecutor's Office requested after having taken up the case of the Cosenza player. On 15 May 2013, a notice of guarantee was served by the Castrovillari Public Prosecutor's Office to his ex-girlfriend Isabella Internò, who was suspected of murder.

For the second time, in May 2017, the investigations into his death were reopened. In June 2017, the GIP of Castrovillari ordered the exhumation of the body to perform an autopsy.

On 16 November 2017, the autopsy results were filed: Bergamini was killed with a scarf and then thrown under the truck, staging the suicide.

=== Trial ===
Four years later the trial begins with the sole defendant being the ex-girlfriend accused of complicity in premeditated voluntary homicide aggravated by futile reasons: Isabella Internò had become pregnant and had an abortion, Bergamini did not want to marry her and had left her and the prosecution maintains that this was the motive. From the evidentiary incident on the exhumed body it is clear that the boy was strangled, perhaps in another place, the body then placed on the road and overtaken by the vehicle. Among the two hundred witnesses who will be heard there will also be four collaborators of justice, former members of 'ndrangheta clans. Regarding the soccer player's death, the repentant Franco Pino told the magistrates, during the preliminary investigations and also in October 2022 before the Assize Court of Cosenza, that it was not a crime committed in a mafia context, that no one asked him to account for it and that, from what he learned by hearsay, it was a suicide.
