= Hutcheson Memorial Forest =

Natural preserve in New Jersey, U.S.

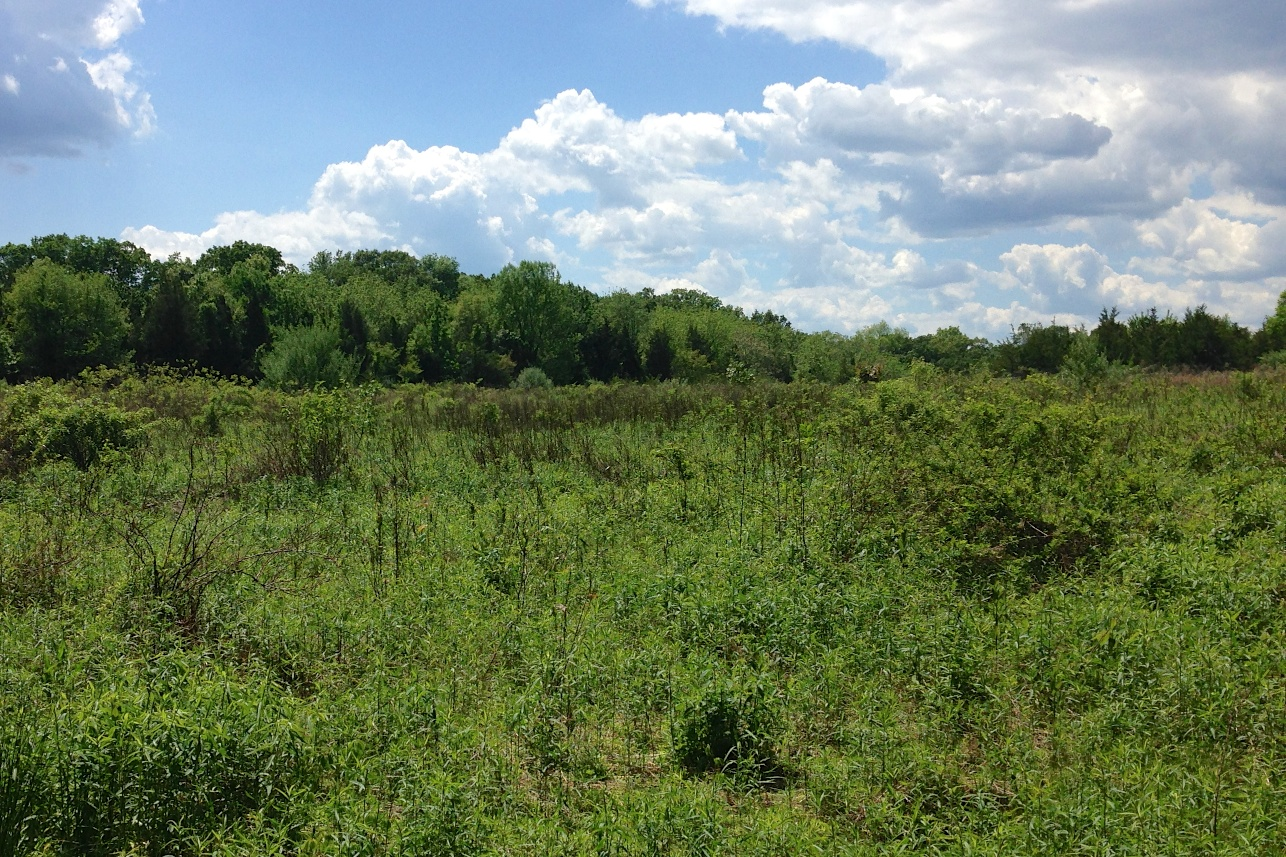

- Location within Somerset County, New Jersey
- Location: Franklin Township, Somerset County, New Jersey
- Nearest city: East Millstone
- Coordinates: 40.50041°N 74.56725°W
- Area: 500 acres (200 ha)
- Established: 1955

U.S. National Natural Landmark
- Designated: 1976

The William L. Hutcheson Memorial Forest is a 500-acre (200 ha) natural preserve at 2150 Amwell Rd. (Route 514) about 3/4 of a mile east of East Millstone in Franklin Township, Somerset County, New Jersey. It is known for its untouched stand of old-growth forest. The Forest was declared a National Natural Landmark in December 1976.

== History ==
The area that includes the 65-acre (26 ha) virgin old growth forest earlier known as Mettler's Woods was acquired from the local Lenape by Dutch settlers in 1701. The old forest was retained by descendants of the original settlers until the mid-1950s. Reportedly, no timber has ever been cut and the ground has never tilled within the forest. The forest canopy is dominated by White Oak, Eastern Black Oak, and Northern Red Oak. American Beech, White Ash, Shagbark Hickory, and Pignut Hickory are also present. The average age of oak trees in the forest is said to be approximately 235 years. Some trees that have died recently have been found to be as old as 350 years.

In 1955, after the wood's owner, Thomas Mettler, considered selling the property, the Citizen's Scientific and Historical Committee for the Preservation of Mettler's Woods raised funds from a variety of sources, including a significant contribution from the United Brotherhood of Carpenters and Joiners of America to purchase it. It was turned over to the care of Rutgers University and The Nature Conservancy after being named for the union's recent president, William L. Hutcheson. Franklin Township and the New Jersey Green Acres Program have also worked in partnership with the caretakers to help preserve and protect this locally rare and important natural resource.

== Hours ==
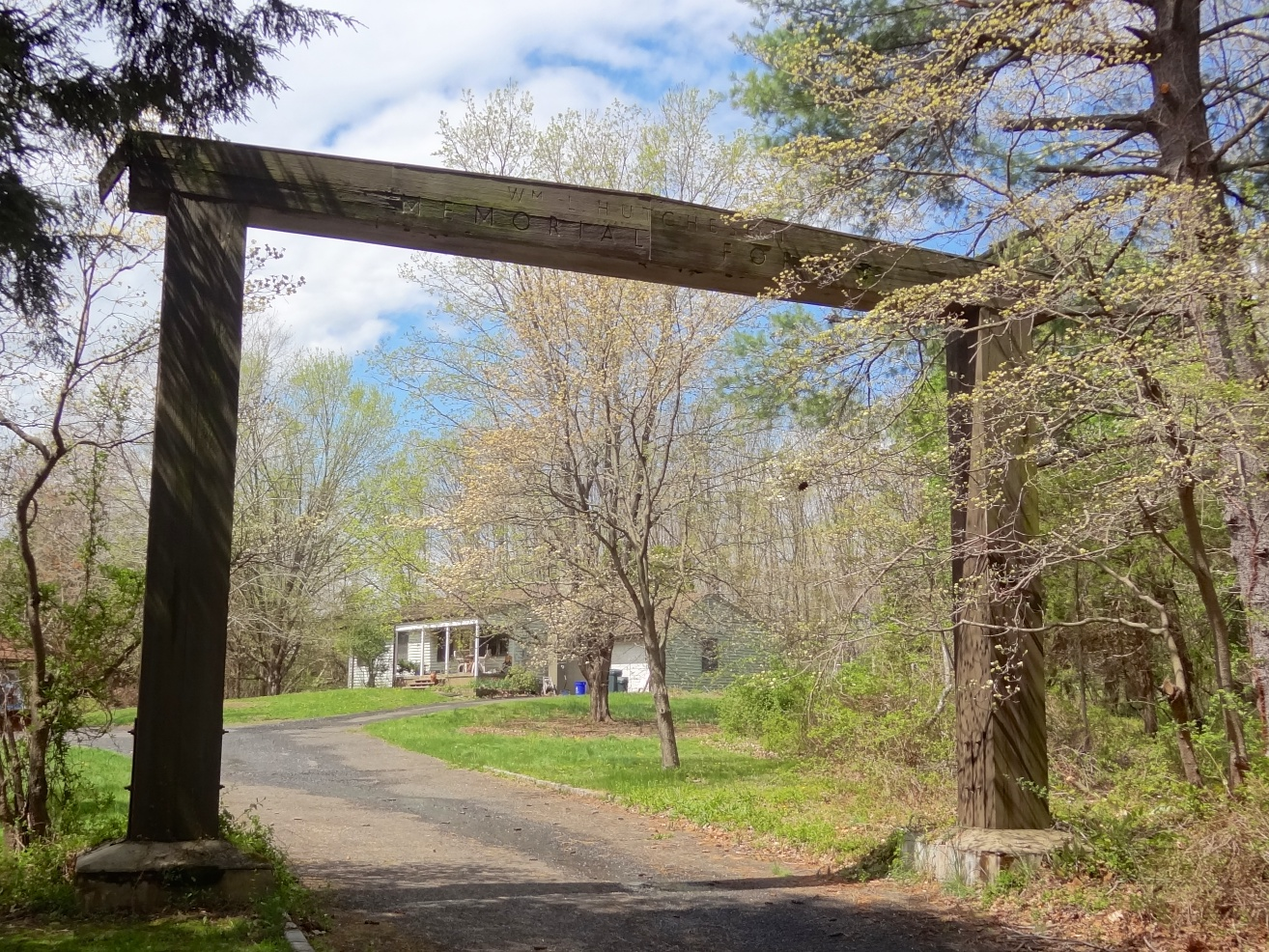
Entrance to forest

The preserve is open from dawn until dusk by appointment. Also, the public is welcome on the regularly scheduled tours given approximately every third Sunday at 2pm throughout the year. The tours are led by Rutgers University faculty volunteers and can run from an hour to two hours in length. Tours are free for groups of less than ten members.

== See also ==
- List of old growth forests
