= Alyssa Bergamini =

American sports broadcaster

- Born: April 30, 1992 (age 33); Homer Glen, Illinois
- Citizenship: American
- Education: University of Iowa (BA)
- Occupations: Emcee, In-Game Host, Public Address Announcer, Radio Broadcaster
- Years active: 2013-present
- Employer: Chicago White Sox (2013-present) NBC Sports Chicago (2019-present) Chicago Bulls (2022-present) WBBM (2024-present)
- Spouse: Matthew Rooney (married 2025-present)

Alyssa Bergamini (born April 30, 1992) is an American sports broadcaster. She works for the Chicago White Sox as an emcee and public address announcer, and the Chicago Bulls as a radio broadcaster on the station WSCR (670 The Score). She was the first female public address announcer for the White Sox, with her debut in September 2024.

== Early life and education ==
Alyssa Bergamini grew up in Homer Glen, Illinois, with her younger sister, Alaina Bergamini, her mother, Rhonda Frederick Bergamini, and her father, Jim Bergamini. She attended Marist High School in Chicago and graduated in 2010, participating in cheerleading during her high school career.

She attended the University of Iowa School of Journalism and Mass Communication, graduating in 2014 with a major in Broadcast Journalism and a minor in Spanish.

== Career ==
Bergamini began her professional career in 2012 as an intern for Fox News Channel and NBC Sports Chicago. Through those internships she learned about the production of sports media through radio, live broadcasting, and television. In 2013, the Chicago White Sox hired her for their in-game entertainment team called the Pride Crew, and in 2017 she became the on-field emcee.

Additionally, Bergamini formally started working for NBC Sports Chicago in 2019 as their on-air radio host, the Chicago Wolves as the in-arena host, and the Schaumburg Boomers as the on-field emcee.

Starting in 2022, she became the radio broadcaster for the Chicago Bulls on the station 670 The Score, where she and Bill Wennington, a former Bulls player, comment on the pre-game and post-game together. Bergamini started her own podcast in 2023 titled Lyssin' Up, where she holds interviews with athletes, local celebrities, and media personalities. She joined WBBM-AM as a sports anchor in August 2024.

Bergamini became the first ever female public address announcer for the White Sox in September 2024, where she took over Gene Honda's role while he was out for the weekend, who had been the PA announcer since 1985. Bergamini announced for the game against Oakland Athletics, where the White Sox broke their 16-home game losing streak.

== Personal life ==
On September 7, 2024, Bergamini got engaged to Matthew Rooney, whom she met at her job with NBC Sports Chicago, and they married in Chicago at Holy Name Cathedral on July 18, 2025.
