= Marco Bergamini =

Italian footballer

Personal information
- Full name: Marco Bergamini
- Date of birth: 12 March 1988 (age 38)
- Place of birth: Lecco, Italy
- Height: 1.88 m (6 ft 2 in)
- Position: Defender

Team information
- Current team: Renate

Youth career
- Milan

Senior career*
Years	Team	Apps	(Gls)
2007–	Milan	0	(0)
2007–2009	→ Olginatese (loan)	58	(2)
2009–2010	→ San Marino (loan)	18	(0)
2010–	→ Renate (loan)	2	(1)
Total		78	(3)
- * Club domestic league appearances and goals as of 5 September 2010

Marco Bergamini (born 12 March 1988) is an Italian footballer, who plays as a defender for Seconda Divisione club Renate, on loan from Milan.
