= Italian frigate Carlo Bergamini =

Carlo Bergamini has been borne by at least two ships of the Italian Navy in honour of Carlo Bergamini and may refer to:

- Italian frigate Carlo Bergamini (F 593), a Bergamini-class frigate launched in 1960 and stricken in 1981.
- Italian frigate Carlo Bergamini (F 590), a Bergamini (2011)-class frigate launched in 2011.
