= Lamberto Bergamini =

Italian opera singer

Lamberto Bergamini (1885–1957) was an Italian operatic tenor who sang leading roles in the opera houses of Italy and South America as well as at the Paris Opera. In the later part of his career he sang comprimario roles and appeared in the world premiere of Ildebrando Pizzetti's Orseolo. He made several recordings for La voce del padrone.

Born in Pisa, Bergamini studied with Mario Pieraccini in Milan and made his debut in Legnano as Fernando in Donizetti's La favorita. In 1911 he sang Don Pasquale and Fedora at the Teatro Chiabrera in Savona, a work he also repeated in his home city of Pisa, along with Vicleffo Scamuzzi.

He was very active with the Opera in Rome, first with the Teatro Costanzi. He later performed Thomas's Mignon in 1916, The Barber of Seville with De Hidalgo, La Bohème in 1918 and the work of Il Dibuk di L. Rocca in 1935.

He sang leading roles in numerous theaters in Italy, including the Teatro Petruzzelli of Bari, performing La traviata, Werther, and La Bohème, Teatro di Verona Philharmonic and at the Teatro alla Scala in Milan, Teatro Comunale Modena, Teatro Carlo Felice in Genoa, Teatro Comunale di Adria, Teatro Regio di Parma, Teatro Morlacchi in Perugia, Teatro Sociale di Trento, and Teatro Massimo in Palermo. Bergamini also sang in a tour abroad in Brazil in São Paulo and Rio de Janeiro), at the Teatro Colysée of Buenos Aires, and at the Teatro Solis in Montevideo in 1914.

In the last years of his career he took part at the Teatro Reale dell'Opera di Roma, along with Tito Schipa, Licia Albanese and Gianna Pederzini, conducted by Tullio Serafin, and sang the role of Nereus in Boito's Mefistofele, along with Ezio Pinza, Giovanni Malipiero and Pia Tassinari in 1936.

Bergamini retired in the late 1930s and lived in Milan.
