= Fred Schwed =

Fred Schwed, Jr. (1902-May 10, 1966) was an American stock broker turned author, known for his book on Wall Street, Where Are the Customers' Yachts?

== Background ==
Schwed was born in New York. Schwed's father, Frederick Schwed, was a member of the New York Curb Exchange (renamed in 1953 to AMEX).

He was a professional trader on Wall Street, but lost much of his wealth in the stock market crash of 1929. He subsequently published a children's book, Wacky, the Small Boy, and later, Where Are the Customers' Yachts? Published in 1940 by Simon & Schuster (New York), the book is often cited by finance people such as Warren Buffett, Jack Bogle, and Michael Lewis as one of the most authentic, timeless, hilarious, and true descriptions of the culture of Wall Street and investment firms.
