= David Bergamini =

American author (1928–1983)

- Born: 1928; Japan
- Died: 1983; Stamford, CT, USA
- Occupations: Writer, historian, journalist
- Years active: 1950s–1980s
- Employer: Time magazine
- Known for: Works on World War II and modern history
- Notable work: Japan's Imperial Conspiracy; The Tragic Dynasty: A History of the Romanovs; The Japanese Discovery of Europe

David Howland Bergamini (11 October 1928, in Tokyo, Japan – 3 September 1983, in Stamford, CT, USA) was an American author who wrote books on 20th-century history and popular science, notably mathematics, though is best known for his controversial research on Japanese imperialism.

Bergamini, born in Tokyo, Japan, was interned for four years as an Allied civilian in a Japanese concentration camp in the Philippines, along with his mother and father, John Van Wie Bergamini, an architect who worked for the American Episcopal Mission in China, Japan, the Philippines and Africa, and younger sister for the duration of World War II.

Following the conclusion of the war, Bergamini attended Dartmouth College until 1949, winning the Peter Grimes prize. Bergamini spent the following two years in England, studying at Merton College, Oxford on a Rhodes Scholarship. In 1951, he joined Time as a reporter and assistant editor; in 1961, he began freelance work for Life magazine, during which he wrote about science and nature.

Later, Bergamini's focus turned to researching Japanese think tanks which, leading up to WWII, had been dedicated to planning imperial conquest of the Asian mainland. This research culminated in his most well-known, over 1200 page work entitled Japan's Imperial Conspiracy. In this volume, Bergamini proffers a theory regarding an active role played by Hirohito in the planning and execution of Japan's aggression in the Asian region from the 1920s through the 1940s. Bergamini's thesis implicates Hirohito and his lineage as the originators and directors of Japan's incursions into China, Manchuria, and South-East Asia, and provides arguments for why Hirohito, against the wishes of the Australian government's Prime Minister Ben Chifley and Minister for External Affairs H. V. Evatt, was not prosecuted for war crimes, and rather maintained a prominent role in post-war reconstruction at the behest of U.S. General Douglas MacArthur. Bergamini's work was, at the time, counter to prevailing historical consensus, and continues to be controversial.

== Partial bibliography ==
- The Fleet in the Window (a novel published in 1961)
- The Universe (Life Nature Library) (1962; revised 1966, 1967)
- Mathematics (Life Science Library) (1963)
- The Land and Wildlife of Australia (Life Nature Library) (1964)
- The Scientist (Life Science Library) (1965)
- Japan's Imperial Conspiracy (1971), ISBN 0-688-01905-6
- Venus Development (a novel published in 1976)
