= List of mythologies =

The following is a list of mythologies.

== Mythologies by region ==
=== Africa ===
- Efik mythology
- Egyptian mythology
- Hadza mythology
- Kalenjin mythology
- Lozi mythology
- Lugbara mythology
- Malagasy mythology
- Mbuti mythology
- Somali mythology
- Tumbuka mythology

=== Americas ===
==== Northern America ====
- Abenaki mythology
- American mythology
- Assiniboine mythology
- Blackfoot mythology
- Californian narratives
  - Achomawi traditional narratives
  - Atsugewi traditional narratives
  - Cahto traditional narratives
  - Cahuilla mythology
  - Chemehuevi traditional narratives
  - Chimariko traditional narratives
  - Chumash traditional narratives
  - Cupeño traditional narratives
  - Eel River Athapaskan traditional narratives
  - Halchidhoma traditional narratives
  - Hupa traditional narratives
  - Karuk traditional narratives
  - Kawaiisu traditional narratives
  - Kitanemuk traditional narratives
  - Kumeyaay traditional narratives
  - Maidu traditional narratives
  - Mattole traditional narratives
  - Miwok mythology
    - Coast Miwok traditional narratives
    - Lake Miwok traditional narratives
    - Plains and Sierra Miwok traditional narratives
  - Modoc traditional narratives
  - Mohave traditional narratives
  - Mono traditional narratives
  - Northern Paiute traditional narratives
  - Ohlone mythology
  - Luiseño traditional narratives
  - Pomo traditional narratives
  - Salinan traditional narratives
  - Serrano traditional narratives
  - Shasta traditional narratives
  - Tolowa traditional narratives
  - Tongva traditional narratives
  - Tubatulabal traditional narratives
  - Wappo traditional narratives
  - Washoe traditional narratives
  - Western Shoshone traditional narratives
  - Wintu-Nomlaki traditional narratives
    - Patwin traditional narratives
  - Wiyot traditional narratives
  - Yana traditional narratives
  - Yokuts traditional narratives
  - Yuki traditional narratives
  - Yurok traditional narratives
- Choctaw mythology
- Creek mythology
- Haida mythology
- Haudenosaunee mythology
  - Seneca mythology
- Ho-Chunk mythology
- Hopi mythology
- Innu mythology
- Lakota mythology
- Lenape mythology
- Kwakwakaʼwakw mythology
- Muscogee mythology
- Navajo mythology
- Nuu-chah-nulth mythology
- Ottawa narratives
- Salishan oral narratives
- Pawnee mythology
- Tsimshian mythology
- Ute mythology
- Zuni mythology

==== Central America ====
- Antiguan and Barbudan mythology
- Aztec mythology
- Haitian mythology
- Huichol mythology
- Lencan mythology
- Maya mythology
- Talamancan mythology
- Taíno mythology

==== South America ====
- Brazilian mythology
- Chaná mythology
- Chilean mythology
- Chilote mythology
- Fuegian mythology
  - Selkʼnam mythology
- Guarani mythology
- Inca mythology
- Muisca mythology
- Pemon mythology
- Peruvian Amazonian Mythology
- Q'ero mythology
- Quechua mythology

=== Asia ===
==== Central and North Asia ====
- Ket mythology
- Nivkh mythology
- Turkic mythology

==== Eastern Asia ====
- Chinese mythology
- Japanese mythology
- Korean mythology
  - Samseong mythology
- Mongol mythology
- Tibetan mythology

==== Southeastern Asia ====
- Burmese mythology
- Indonesian mythology
  - Balinese mythology
  - Batak mythology
- Philippine mythology
- Vietnamese mythology

==== Southern Asia ====
- Bengali mythology
- Buddhist mythology
- Hindu mythology
  - Ayyavazhi mythology
  - Vedic mythology
- Kashmiri mythology
- Mazandarani mythology
- Meitei mythology
- Persian mythology
- Romani mythology
- Talysh mythology
- Tamil mythology

==== Western Asia ====
- Armenian mythology
- Azerbaijani mythology
- Christian mythology
- Georgian mythology
- Hittite mythology
- Islamic mythology
- Jewish mythology
- Kurdish mythology
- Mesopotamian mythology

=== Europe ===
==== Eastern Europe ====
- Hungarian mythology
- Komi mythology
- Mari mythology
- Ossetian mythology
- Paleo-Balkan mythology
- Proto-Indo-European mythology
- Slavic mythology

==== Northern Europe ====
- Baltic mythology
  - Latvian mythology
  - Lithuanian mythology
  - Prussian mythology
- English mythology
- Finnic mythologies
  - Estonian mythology
  - Finnish mythology
- Germanic mythology
  - Continental Germanic mythology
  - Norse mythology

==== Southern Europe ====
- Asturian mythology
- Basque mythology
- Cantabrian mythology
- Catalan mythology
- Classical mythology
- Extremaduran mythology
- Galician mythology
- Greek mythology
- Lusitanian mythology
- Italian mythology
- Pyrenean mythology
- Roman mythology

==== Western Europe ====
- Alpine mythology
- Celtic mythology
  - Breton mythology
  - Cornish mythology
  - Hebridean mythology
  - Irish mythology
  - Manx mythology
  - Scottish mythology
  - Welsh mythology
- French mythology
- Low Countries Mythology

=== Oceania ===
- Australian mythology
  - Australian Aboriginal mythology
  - Larrakia mythology
  - Yolnu mythology
- Melanesian mythology
  - Fijian mythology
  - Papuan mythology
- Micronesian mythology
- Polynesian narrative
  - Cook Islands mythology
  - Niuean mythology
  - Mangarevan narrative
  - Māori mythology
  - Rapa Nui mythology
  - Samoan mythology
  - Tahiti and Society Islands mythology
  - Tongan narrative
  - Tuvaluan mythology

== Folklore ==
- Albanian folklore
- American folklore
  - African American folklore
  - Hawaiian folklore
  - Minnesotan folklore
  - Mormon folklore
  - West Virginian folklore
- Antiguan and Barbudan folklore
- Australian folklore
- Azerbaijani folklore
- British folklore
  - English folklore
  - Manx folklore
  - Scottish folklore
    - Hebridean folklore
  - Welsh folklore
- Canadian folklore
- Caribbean folklore
  - Dominican folklore
- Chinese folklore
- Colombian folklore
- Czech folklore
- Danish folklore
- Esan folklore
- Estonian folklore
- Finn folklore
- French folklore
- German folklore
- Greek folklore
  - Ancient Greek folklore
- Honduran folklore
- Indian folklore
  - Maldivian folklore
  - Meitei folklore
  - Naga folklore
  - Nepalese folklore
  - Pakistani folklore
    - Punjabi folklore
    - Sindhi folklore
- Indonesian folklore
- Iranian folklore
- Irish folklore
- Italian folklore
- Japanese folklore
- Jewish folklore
- Kalenjin folklore
- Korean folklore
- Kosovar folklore
- Lao folklore
- Low Countries folklore
  - Belgian folklore
- Malaysian folklore
  - Malay folklore
- Maltese folklore
- Mexican folklore
- Nordic folklore
- Qatari folklore
- Roman folklore
- Romanian folklore
- Russian folklore
- Rwandan folklore
- Salvadoran folklore
- Sarajevan folklore
- Serbian folklore
- South African folklore
  - Afrikaans folklore
- Spanish folklore
- Swiss folklore
- Thai folklore
- Turkish folklore
- Ugandan folklore
- Ukrainian folklore

== Fictional mythologies ==
- List of fictional deities
- Cthulhu Mythos
- Glorantha
- William Blake's mythology
- J.R.R. Tolkien's Middle-earth
- Discworld

== See also ==
- Archaeomythology
- Architectural mythology
- Folklorism
- List of religions and spiritual traditions
- List of creation myths
- List of legendary creatures by type
- List of mythology books and sources
- List of mythological objects
- List of culture heroes
- List of world folk-epics
- Lists of deities
- Lists of legendary creatures
- National myth
- Mythopoeia
