= Mythologies of the Indigenous peoples of the Americas =

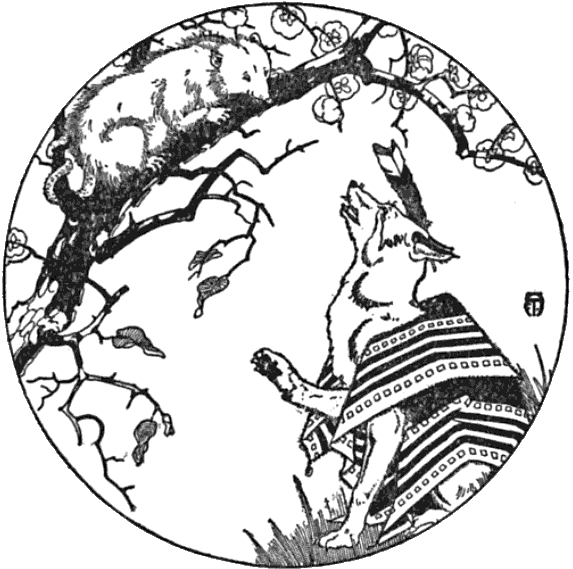
Coyote and Opossum appear in the stories of several tribes.

The Indigenous peoples of the Americas comprise numerous different cultures. Each has its own mythologies, many of which share certain themes across cultural boundaries. In North American mythologies, common themes include a close relation to nature and animals as well as belief in a Great Spirit that is conceived of in various ways. As anthropologists note, their great creation myths and sacred oral tradition in whole are comparable to the Christian Bible and scriptures of other major religions.

== Northern America ==
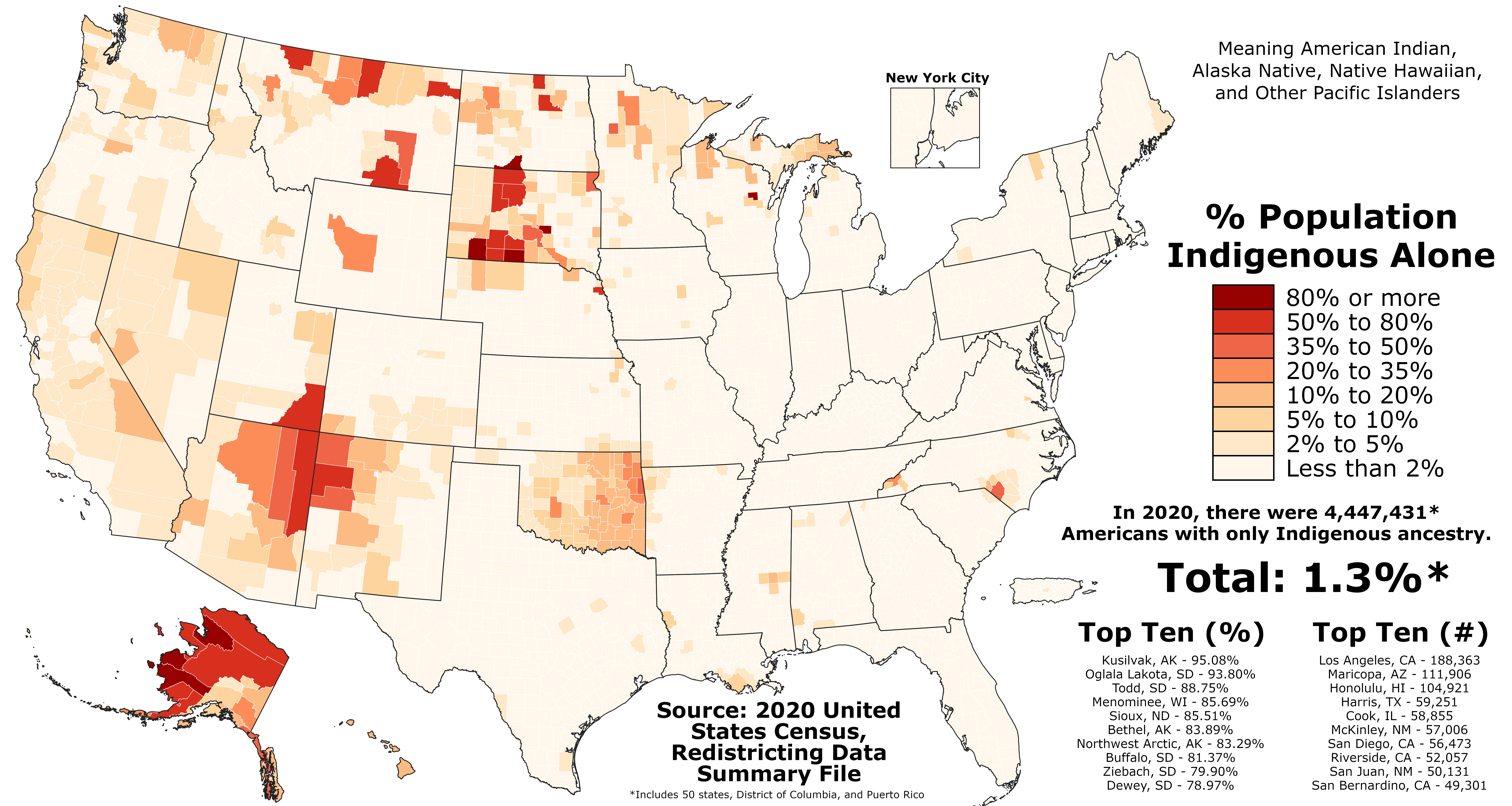
Proportion of Indigenous Americans in each county of the fifty states, the District of Columbia, and Puerto Rico as of the 2020 United States Census

There is no single mythology of the Native Americans in the United States, the Indigenous peoples in Canada and other peoples, but numerous different canons of traditional narratives associated with religion, ethics and beliefs. Such stories are deeply based in Nature and are rich with the symbolism of seasons, weather, plants, animals, earth, water, fire, sky, and the heavenly bodies. Common elements are the principle of an all-embracing, universal and omniscient Great Spirit, a connection to the Earth and its landscapes, a belief in a parallel world in the sky (sometimes also underground and/or below the water), diverse creation narratives, visits to the 'land of the dead', and collective memories of ancient sacred ancestors.

A characteristic of many of the myths is the close relationship between human beings and animals (including birds and reptiles). They often feature shape-shifting between animal and the human form. Marriage between people and different species (particularly bears) is a common theme. In some stories, animals foster human children.

Although most Native North American myths are profound and serious, some use light-hearted humor – often in the form of tricksters – to entertain, as they subtly convey important spiritual and moral messages. The use of allegory is common, exploring issues ranging from love and friendship to domestic violence and mental illness.

Some myths are connected to traditional religious rituals involving dance, music, songs, and trance (e.g. the Sun Dance).

Most of the myths from this region were first transcribed by ethnologists during the late 19th and early 20th centuries. These sources were collected from Native American elders who still had strong connections to the traditions of their ancestors. They may be considered the most authentic surviving records of the ancient stories, and thus form the basis of the descriptions below.

=== Northeast & Midwest (Southeastern Canada and Northeastern US, including the Great Lakes) ===
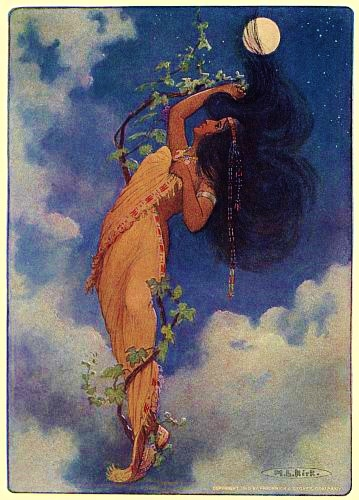
From the full moon fell Nokomis – from The Story of Hiawatha, 1910

Myths from this region feature female deities, such as the creator, Big Turtle; and First Mother, from whose body grew the first corn and tobacco. The two great divine culture heroes are Glooskap and Manabus.

Other stories explore the complex relationships between animals and human beings. Some myths were originally recited as verse narratives.

- Anishinaabe traditional beliefs - The Anishinaabeg peoples (Algonquin/Nipissing, Ojibwa/Chippewa/Saulteaux/Mississaugas, Odawa, Potawatomi and Oji-Cree)
- Ho-Chunk mythology - A North American tribe located in now eastern Wisconsin.
- Iroquois mythology - A confederacy of tribes located in the New York state area.
- Lenape mythology
- Seneca mythology - A North American tribe located south of Lake Ontario.
- Wyandot religion - A North American tribe located around the northern shore of Lake Ontario.

=== Great Plains ===
Stories unique to the Great Plains feature buffalo, which provided the Plains peoples with food, clothing, housing and utensils. In some myths they are benign, in others fearsome and malevolent. The Sun is an important deity; other supernatural characters include Morning Star and the Thunderbirds.

A common theme is the making of a journey, often to a supernatural place across the landscape or up to the parallel world in the sky.

One of the most dominant trickster stories of the Plains is Old Man, about whom numerous humorous stories are told. The Old Man, known as Waziya, lived beneath the earth with his wife, and they had a daughter. Their daughter married the wind and had four sons: North, East, South, and West. The sun, moon and winds then ruled the universe together.

An important supernatural hero is the Blood Clot Boy, transformed from a clot of blood.

- Ho-Chunk mythology
- Lakota mythology
- Pawnee mythology

=== Southeastern US ===
Important myths of this region deal with the origin of hunting and farming, and the origin of sickness and medicine.

An important practice of this region was animism, the belief that all objects, places, and creatures have a soul. Most death, disease, or misfortune would be associated with the failure to put the soul of a slain animal to rest. When this happens, the animal could get vengeance through their "species chief". Large amounts of rare materials found with this regions dead suggest strong evidence that they believed in a sort of afterlife. It is thought that when a member of a tribe died, their soul would hover over their communities, trying to get their friends and relatives to join them, so their funeral ceremonies were not just to commemorate the dead, but to protect the living.

The Green Corn ceremony, also known as Busk, was an annual celebration of a successful corn crop. Their fires were put out and rekindled, grudges are forgiven, and materials are thrown out or broken to then be replaced, acting as a renewal of life and community for these tribes.

==== Cherokee Myth of Creation ====
There was a time when there was no earth, and all creatures lived in a place above the sky called Galvlo’i. Everything below was only water, but when Galvlo’i got too crowded, the creatures decided to send down Water Beetle to see if he could find them a new place to live. He obliged and dove down into the water, all the way to the bottom of the sea, where he picked up a bit of mud and brought it to the surface. Once above the water, the mud spread out in all directions and became an island. The Great Spirit secured the island by attaching cords to it and tying it to the vault in the sky.

Though the land was now stable, the ground was too soft for any of the animals to stand on, so they sent down Buzzard to scope it out. He flew around for some time until he could find a dry enough spot to land, and when he did the flapping of his wings caused the mud to shift. It went down in some places and up in others, creating the peaks, valleys, hills, and mountains of the earth. The rest of the creatures were now able to come down, but they soon realized it was very dark, so they invited the sun to come with them. Everyone was happy except Crawfish, who said his shell turned a bright red because the sun was too close, so they raised the sun seven different times until Crawfish was satisfied.

The Great Spirit then created plants for this new land, after which he told the animals to stay awake for seven days. Only Owl was able to do so, and as a reward, the Great Spirit gave him the gift of sight in the dark. The plants tried as well, but only the pines, firs, holly, and a select few others were able to stay awake, so he gave them the gift of keeping their leaves year-round. Great Spirit then decided he wanted to have people live on this island, so he created one man and one woman. The pair did not yet know how to make children, so the man took a fish and pressed it against the woman's stomach, after which she gave birth. They did this for seven days until Great Spirit felt there was enough humans for the time being, and made it so a woman could only give birth once a year.

See also:

- Cherokee mythology – A North American tribe that migrated from the great lakes area to the southeastern woodlands.
- Choctaw mythology – A North American tribe from the area of modern-day Alabama, Florida, Mississippi and Louisiana.
- Creek mythology – A North American tribe from the area of modern-day Georgia and Alabama.

=== Caribbean US ===
- Taíno mythology – This mythology and philosophy expresses the spiritual beliefs of the maritime Maipurean island settlers from the Amazon and/or Arawakan group of peoples. Their lineage and mythologies include having a creator deity as well as endless cyclical spontaneous birth. Immigrating from North East South America, their stories include gods and deity veneration as well as a view beyond that. Some of the philosophies include a concept of reality as illusion; and also that this world is a dream. Some petroglyphs on the islands include references interpreted to suggest galactic or alien life. Today's members of the community have established several views of mythology; some indicating ancestor veneration while others focus on deity and spirit veneration. The belief sets indicate the lineage rather than pointing to one absolute truth. A commonality between lineages includes honoring ancestors through cemi/zemi stones; spiritual homes of the lineage, as well as respecting sun and moon spirits. Weather spirits and spirits of the honored dead are also respectfully acknowledged.

=== California and Great Basin ===
Myths of this region are dominated by the sacred creator/trickster Coyote. Other significant characters include the Sun People, the Star Women and Darkness.

A few of the most distinctive ceremonies of this region were their funeral customs and their commemoration of the dead. When a death occurred, the house in which it happened would be burnt down, and there would sometimes be bans on speaking the name of the dead. Widows would be smeared with pitch and their hair would be cut until the annual mourning releases them. This mourning came to be known as the "burning", the "cry", or the "dance of the dead". During these ceremonies, multiple properties are burned while the tribe dances, chants, and wails, in order to appease the ghosts.

Another common ceremony is one that takes place when adolescents hit puberty. Girls go through a series of grueling tabus when her first period starts but is followed by a celebratory dance when it ends. Boys will undergo an official initiation into the tribe by participating in ceremonies that recount the tribes' mysteries and myths.

See also:

- Earth-maker myth
- Kuksu – a religion in Northern California practiced by members within several Indigenous peoples of California.
- Miwok mythology – a North American tribe in Northern California.
- Ohlone mythology – a North American tribe in Northern California.
- Pomo religion – a North American tribe in Northern California.

=== Southwest ===
Myths of the Navajo, Apache, and Pueblo peoples tell how the first human beings emerged from an underworld to the Earth. According to the Hopi Pueblo people, the first beings were the Sun, two goddesses known as Hard Being Woman (Huruing Wuhti) and Spider Woman. It was the goddesses who created living creatures and human beings. Other themes include the origin of tobacco and corn, and horses; and a battle between summer and winter. Some stories describe parallel worlds in the sky and underwater.

Multi-sensory experiences also are prominent in Ancestral Pueblo ceremonial rituals; for example, to evoke a paradisiacal realm, Chacoan people would perform sensorial ceremonies by use of exotic artifacts such as turquoise, shell, cacao, copper bells, and macaws.

See also:

- Ute mythology – a North American tribe located in both the Northwestern and Southwestern United States.
- Diné Bahaneʼ (Navajo) – a North American nation from the Southwestern United States.
- Hopi mythology – a North American tribe in Arizona.
- Zuni mythology – a North American tribe in New Mexico.

=== Plateau ===
Myths of the Plateau region express the people's intense spiritual feeling for their landscapes and emphasize the importance of treating with respect the animals that they depend upon for food. Sacred tricksters here include Coyote and Fox.

See also:

- Salish mythology – a North American tribe or band in Montana, Idaho, Washington and British Columbia, Canada

=== Arctic (coastal Alaska, northern Canada, and Greenland) ===
The myths of this region are strongly set in the landscape of tundra, snow, and ice. Memorable stories feature the winds, the moon, and the giants. Some accounts say that Anguta is the supreme being, who created the Earth, sea and heavenly bodies. His daughter, Sedna created all living things – animals and plants. Sedna is also regarded as the protecting divinity of the Inuit.

=== Subarctic (inland northern Canada and Alaska) ===
Here some myths reflect the extreme climate and the people's dependence on salmon as a major food resource. In imagination, the landscape is populated by both benign and malevolent giants.

=== Northwest ===
In this region, the dominant sacred trickster is Raven, who brought daylight to the world and appears in many other stories. Myths explore the people's relationship with the coast and the rivers along which they traditionally built their towns. There are stories of visits to parallel worlds beneath the sea and up in the sky.

See also:

- Kwakwakaʼwakw mythology – an Indigenous peoples of the Pacific Northwest Coast.
- Lummi – a North American tribe from the Pacific Northwest, Washington state area.
- Nuu-chah-nulth mythology – a group of indigenous peoples living on Vancouver Island in British Columbia.
- Haida mythology – a nation living in Haida Gwaii and the Alaska Panhandle.
- Tsimshian mythology – an indigenous people of the Pacific Northwest Coast living on the British Columbia Coast and Alaska's Annette Islands.
- Nuxalk religion – a First Nation centred in the area in and around Bella Coola, British Columbia.

=== Aztecs ===
The Aztecs, who predominantly inhabited modern-day central Mexico, had a complex system of beliefs based on deities who directly affected the lives of humans, including those who controlled rain, the rising Sun, and fertility. Voluntary human sacrifice was a central piece to the order of the universe and human survival.

The Aztecs viewed people as servants and warriors of the gods, whom were not merciful or generous, but all-powerful beings that needed to be fed and appeased in order to avoid disaster and punishment. Thus, the concept of human sacrifice emerged. This practice was not new and had been used in other cultures such as the Mayans, but the Aztecs made this their main event, so to speak, in their ceremonies. These sacrifices were mainly to appease the Sun God, Huitzilopochtli.

==== Creation Myth ====
According to Aztec belief, the creation of the earth started with a god called Ometeotl, otherwise known as the Dual God, as they were made from the union of Tonacatecuhtli and Tonacacihuatl, whom the Aztecs believed were the lord and lady of their sustenance. Tonacatecuhtli and Tonacacihuatl had four children: Xipe Totec, which translates to "the flayed god" in Nahuatl, is associated with the color red. He is the god of the seasons and all things that grow on the earth. Tezcatlipoca, which translates to "smoking mirror", is associated with the color black. He is the god of the earth and the most powerful of the four children. Quetzalcoatl, which translates to "plumed serpent", is associated with the color white. He is the god of air. Finally, Huitzilopochtli, which translates to "hummingbird of the south", is associated with the color blue. He is the god of war.

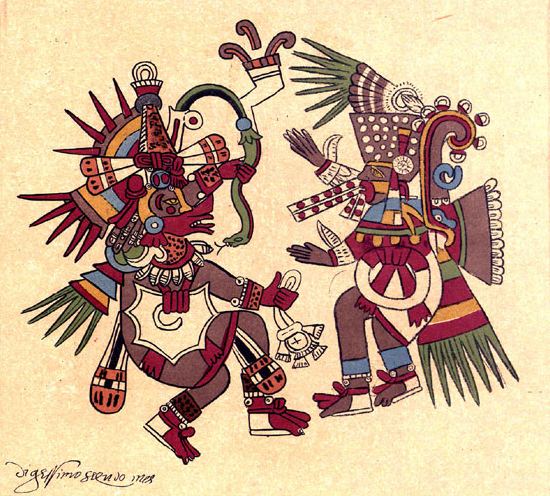
Quetzalcoatl (The Plumed Serpent), the god of the air. And Tezcatlipoca (Smoking Mirror), the god of the earth.

The four children decided they wanted to create a world with people to live in it. Quetzalcoatl and Huitzilopochtli made the first attempt, starting by making fire. This fire became the sun, but only half a sun, because it was not big or bright enough to light their entire world. They then made the first man and woman, which they called Cipactonal and Oxomoco respectively. Their many children were called macehuales, and were to be the farmers of the land. From there they created time, and then the underworld known as Mictlán. There are many stories of how the age of the fifth and final sun came to be. One story tells of how Tezcatlipoca took flint and used it to make fires to light the world again, before discussing with his brothers what should be done. They decided to make a new sun that feeds on the hearts and blood of humans. To feed it, they made four hundred men and five women. This is where the story goes into different directions. Some say that both Quetzalcoatl and Tlaloc wanted their sons to become the new sun, so they each threw their sons into one of the fires created by Tezcatlipoca. Tlaloc waited for the fire to burn out before throwing his son into the embers, so his son became the moon. Quetzalcoatl elected to throw his son directly into the fiery blaze, so he became the fifth and final sun that we see in the sky today. Another story tells of the gathering of the gods at the ancient city of Teotihuacan, to discuss how to make a new sun. A god by the name of Nanahuatzin, god of disease, offered to throw himself into the fire and become the new sun. Being a weak and sickly god, the others thought he should not be the one to do it, and that a stronger and more powerful god should be the sun. Tecuciztecatl, a very wealthy god, stepped forward and said he would do it, but was not able to find the courage to jump into the flames. Nanahuatzin, with little hesitation, then threw himself into the fire. Seeing his bravery, Tecuciztecatl decided to jump in too. They were both transformed into suns, but the light was now too bright to see anything, so one of the other gods threw a rabbit at Tecuciztecatl, dimming his light and turning him into the moon. Nanahuatzin, now the new sun, was essentially reborn as Ollin Tonatiuh. The problem they now had was that he would not move from his position in the sky unless the other gods sacrificed their blood for him. So a god by the name of Tlahuizcalpantecuhtli, lord of dawn, threw a dart at Tonatiuh, but missed. Tonatiuh then threw one back at Tlahuizcalpantecuhtli, hitting him in the head and turning him into Itzlacoliuhqui, god of coldness, frost, and obsidian. Realizing that they could not refuse, the other gods offered their bare chests to him, and Quetzalcoatl cut out their hearts with a sacrificial knife. With the blood of the gods, Tonatiuh began to move across the sky in the same pattern that we see to this day. Quetzalcoatl took the clothing and ornaments of the sacrificed gods and wrapped them in bundles, which the people then worshipped.

== Central America ==
Central America refers to the narrow area between North and South America, although the geographic outline of this region is arbitrary in the context of the indigenous tribes; many nations lived in and passed through this region. The religion in this area can be characterized by connection with the natural world, and many groups had positions such as priests and shamans to facilitate this relationship. The Aztec Empire also stretched south into this region.

- Lencan mythology – a Central American people of southwest Honduras and eastern El Salvador in Central America.
- Maya mythology – an ancient Central American people of southern Mexico and northern Central America.
- Olmec religion – an ancient Central American people of south-central Mexico, in the present-day states of Veracruz and Tabasco.
- Purépecha religion – a Central American people centered around Lake Pátzcuaro.
- Talamancan mythology – combined mythologies of the Bribri and Cabécar peoples of the Talamanca region in Costa Rica.

== Southern America ==
There are numerous different mythologies of the Indigenous peoples of South America.

- Brazilian mythology – the subset of Brazilian folklore with cultural elements of diverse origin found in Brazil, comprising folk tales, traditions, characters and beliefs regarding places, peoples, and entities.
- Chaná mythology – the folk tales and beliefs of Chaná people about places, peoples and entities around them.
- Chilote mythology – the cultures of Chono and Huilliche, who live on the Chiloé Archipelago, off the coast of southern Chile.
- Guarani mythology – the folk tales of an indigenous people of the Gran Chaco, especially in Paraguay and parts of the surrounding areas of Argentina, Brazil, and Bolivia and Some regions in the southern part of South America.
- Inca mythology (Religion in the Inca Empire) – the beliefs of a South American empire based in the central Andes mountain range.
- Mapuche religion – the religious beliefs of an indigenous people in Chile.
- Muisca mythology – the beliefs of the indigenous people of the Altiplano Cundiboyacense in the modern Eastern Ranges of the Colombian Andes.
- Selk'nam mythology – the beliefs of the Selk'nam and Haush peoples of Tierra del Fuego, an island near the southern tip of South America.

== See also ==
- Native American religions
- List of Mythologies

== Bibliography ==
- Alexander, Hartley Burr (2012). Native American Mythology. Dover Publications. ISBN 978-0-486-12279-3.
- Bastian, Dawn Elaine; Judy K. Mitchell (2004). Handbook of Native American Mythology. ABC-CLIO. ISBN 978-1-85109-533-9.
- Erdoes, Richard and Ortiz, Alfonso: American Indian Myths and Legends (New York: Pantheon Books, 1984)
- Ferguson, Diana (2001). Native American myths. Sterling Publishing Company Incorporated. ISBN 978-1-85585-824-4.
- Gill, Sam D.; Irene F. Sullivan (1994). Dictionary of Native American mythology. Oxford University Press. ISBN 978-0-19-508602-7.
- Kelley, Dennis F. (2005). "North American Indian Religions: Mythic Themes". In Lindsay Jones (ed.). Encyclopedia of Religion: 15-volume Set. Vol. 10 (2nd ed.). Farmington Hills, Mi: Macmillan Reference USA – via Encyclopedia.com.
- Kerven, Rosalind (2018) Native American Myths collected 1636 – 1919. Talking Stone. ISBN 9780953745487
- Korotayev, Andrey et al. Which genes and myths did the different waves of the peopling of Americas bring to the New World?. History and Mathematics 6 (2017): 9–77.
- Lowenstein, Tom; Piers Vitebsky (2011). Native American Myths and Beliefs. The Rosen Publishing Group. ISBN 978-1-4488-5992-4.
- Pearce, Q. L. (2012). Native American Mythology. Mythology and culture worldwide. Detroit, Mi: Lucent Books. ISBN 978-1-4205-0716-4.
- Ramen, Fred (2008). Native American Mythology. The Rosen Publishing Group. ISBN 978-1-4042-0738-7.
- Spence, Lewis (2012). Native American Myths. Dover Publications. ISBN 978-0-486-11235-0.
- Taylor, Colin F. (1994). Native American myths and legends. Smithmark Publishers. ISBN 978-0-8317-6290-2.
- Thompson, Stith: Folk Tales of the North American Indians (Indiana University Press 1929)
- Tooker, Elisabeth, ed. (1979). Native North American Spirituality of the Eastern Woodlands: sacred myths, dreams, visions, speeches, healing formulas, rituals, and ceremonials. Mahwah, NJ: Paulist Press. ISBN 0-8091-2256-1.
- VÁzquez, Juan Adolfo (1987). "South American Indian Religions: Mythic Themes". In Mircea Eliade (ed.). The Encyclopedia of Religion. Vol. 13. New York: Macmillan. ISBN 0-02-909840-8 – via Encyclopedia.com.
