= The Wagadu Chronicles =

MMO online role-playing game

- Developer: Twin Drums
- Publisher: Twin Drums
- Platform: Windows
- Release: 4 December 2023 (early access)
- Genre: RPG
- Mode: Massively multiplayer

The Wagadu Chronicles is a discontinued afro-fantasy massively multiplayer online role-playing game created by Twin Drums studios. The concept began as a pen-and-paper role-playing setting designed for Dungeons & Dragons 5th edition.

In May 2024, Twin Drums announced the closure of the game servers, citing financial difficulties.

== Setting ==
The fantasy world of Wagadu is based on African mythology. In the fictional setting, the story begins when a civilization called the Upper Worlds disappears and crashes into the purgatorial realm of Wagadu. These lost people must band together to survive the often hostile wilderness.

The game allows players to select different ancestral lineages, inspired by African ethnic groups such as the Yoruba in Nigeria and the Maasai in Kenya. These are combined with fantasy elements such as magic, or anatomical differences from humans. Wagadu contains several biomes based on Africa, including the savannah, desert, swamp, and rainforest. Additional regions are inspired by South Africa, Ghana, Mali, and Congo.

== Development ==
The Wagadu Chronicles is created by Twin Drums, a game development studio founded by Allan Cudicio in Berlin. Cudicio is half-Ghanaian and raised in Italy, and became interested in designing a game that explored African heritage. In order to set a clear vision for his team and potential stakeholders, Cudicio spend a great deal of time in pre-production, testing gameplay concepts and doing research. As his growing team developed concept art, they were able to build an audience on social media, leading them to launch a successful Kickstarter campaign that raised nearly $200,000. This success allowed them to obtain further funding through the German government, and later through League of Legends developer Riot Games. The studio's core team includes nine employees, the majority of whom are black women.

Cudicio began to describe the game as Animal Crossing meets Dungeons & Dragons in an African sauce. The African-inspired setting became a project to decolonize the fantasy genre, which had traditionally been based on European myths featuring fantasy people with European features. The setting premise was designed as a crash between worlds, where the players would have to explore a new realm with limited prior knowledge. This was to avoid the fact that the setting would be unfamiliar to many players. The studio recognized that their audience would need to overcome stereotypes about medieval Africa, and the game pulled elements from pre-colonial Africa such as walled cities, temples, blacksmiths, scriptures, and empires.

Some of the gameplay elements were inspired by reimagining traditional mechanics with a fantasy bend. For example, players can gain materials from animals without killing them, inspired by African concepts of respecting nature and asking for blessing. The team also set a goal to create a role-play heavy setting where players interact with each other, in contrast to other massively multiplayer games that focus on combat and grinding.

== Reception ==
The Wagadu Chronicles was listed in Polygon's best tabletop role-playing games of 2022, citing its imagination going beyond what other games had done before, and the ability to experience it as a video game or pen-and-paper game.

However the early access computer game only managed to capture a niche audience on Steam.
