= Folklore in Rwanda =

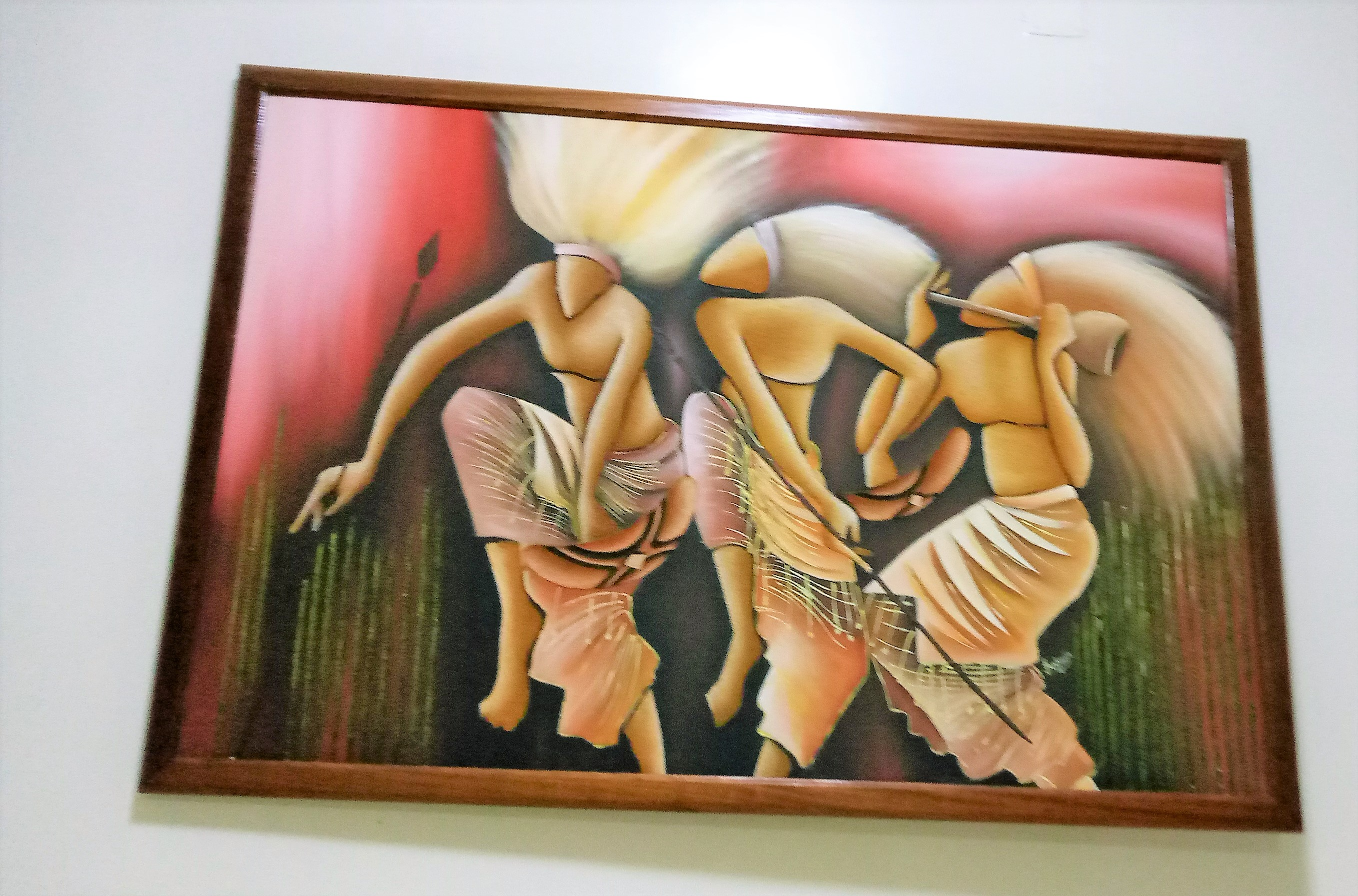
Intore dance illustration, meaning Dance of Heroes

Rwandese folklore comprises the myths, legends and fables, including mythical creatures, urban legends, proverbs (imigani), superstitions, balladry and folktales, passed down orally for centuries. Though most Rwandans believe in Abrahamic religions, folklore preserves ancient Banyarwanda identity and shapes modern society. Notably, it shares features with Abrahamic beliefs, including a monotheistic God, spirits akin to the soul, and concepts of heaven and an underworld. Many stories blend the line between history and myth.

== Folktales ==
=== Figures and heroes ===
- Ryangombe was a demi-god, warrior and leader, admired in his time, who after his death, became the leader of the imandwa, a group of spirits who mediate between Imana and humans. Another version of his story, recounts Ryangombe (alive) stumbling upon a sacred grove, where he encounters spirits who recognize his talents and offer him the chance to ascend to the spiritual realm. Ryangombe accepts, and is transformed into a powerful spirit, who becomes the leader of imandwa.
- Ngunda was a man of unmatched strength and greed, who tilled the land with such power and ate with such hunger that his cultivation and work on the land created Rwanda's hills. When visiting his father-in-law Mirenge, he wore down 50 hoes cultivating the land and devoured an entire cow, multiple baskets of bread and jars of beer with no satisfaction.
- Ndabaga was a heroine, celebrated for devoting herself to the king's army in order to save her father. In the story, it was law for a man's sons to serve in the king's army, otherwise said man would serve the king for as long as he lived. Ndabaga's father, Nyamutezi had no sons however, Ndabaga, determined to save her father from that fate, disguised herself as a man and trained herself to her limits. For her courage she was awarded with cattle, and her story is remembered with the saying "Ibintu byageze iwa Ndabaga", which roughly translates to "Things reached Ndabaga’s place".
- Mwungeri was a man remembered for his integrity and honesty, qualities that evoked jealousy from others. One day, his detractors refused to lend him a bull for breeding, so that his bull is eventually forced to mate with a mystical bull from the underworld. This jealous act backfired, with Mwungeri's herd multiplying rapidly which brought him prosperity. However one night, a man named Gashubi snuck into Mwungeri's home and sexually assaulted his wife.
- Nyirarucyaba was the sole daughter of Gihanga, the creator of the Kingdom of Rwanda, and was believed in myth to have brought cows to the kingdom. She was described to have fled her home over a dispute between her mother, Nyamususa, and her stepmother, Nyirampirangwe, in which she defended her mother violently. Fearing punishment, she fled to the court of King Gihanga. She married a farmer named Kazigaba, and one day, an unfamiliar animal arrived at their home and gave birth the next day. Nyirarucyaba investigated a dripping liquid and returned to King Gihanga bearing the milk as a gift. The king, relieved after a sip, ordered his servants to retrieve these cows for Rwanda. Mount Kabuye in Gakenke District's Nemba sector is believed to have sheltered Nyirarucyaba and her cows.

=== Deities ===
- Nyabinghi, one of the most well known Rwandan deities, was a powerful female deity, who's believed to intervene in daily life to provide well-being. People would offer gifts to appease her and maintain prosperity.

=== Mythical creatures ===
- Abatangana were described as primordial giants created by Imana to shape the earth, which created rivers, lakes and landscapes.
- Inzoka were malevolent, snake-like spirits that dwelled among lakes and rivers, believed to wield power over droughts and floods.

== Imana ==
In pre-colonial Rwanda, Imana was seen as the supreme God whom lived above the heavens (today the world refers to the Christian God). However he/she/it was viewed distant and rarely intervenes in everyday life, therefore Rwanda's religion was theocentric, but the supreme being's influence was channeled through spiritual intermediaries.

In pre-colonial Rwanda, similar to the Christian God, Imana was viewed as the ultimate judge of human behavior, and wrongdoing could bring misfortune. The same concept existed in Barundi mythology, and the word for the Christian God also being Imana

== Spirits and Humans ==
=== Dualism ===
Rwanda's folklore has a perception of the humans best described as dualist, with a person having two parts, a visible body and an invisible spirit. Death was viewed upon as a transition into abazimu, the spirits of the dead. Since, spirits and kings were viewed as intermediaries between Imana, they yield more power, such as being able to control sickness and crop failure.

=== Ancestors ===
Over time the newly dead become sacred, honored spirits, to which families pray to. Funeral rites were very important. The family would stop all work after the death, and the women of the family would shave their heads as a sign of mourning. Because volcanoes were believed to be the resting place of ancestral spirits, death was believed to be "hot", hence the spirit Umufumu would be summoned to cool the house of the deceased.

== Kingship ==
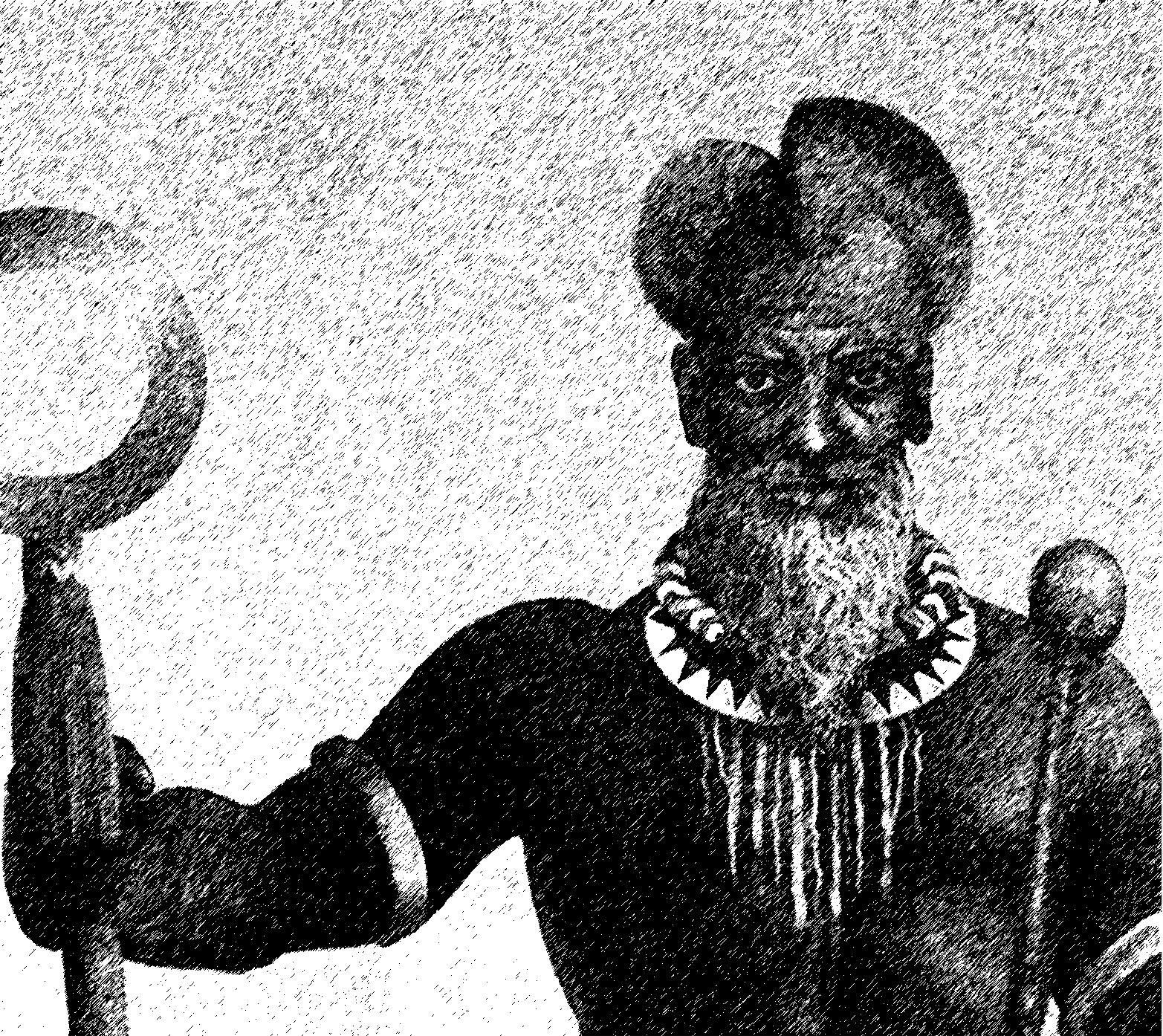
Depiction of Gihanga Ngomijana Minaganza, the legendary first monarch in Rwanda's society

Kings were considered chosen by Imana, and their rule was seen as divinely sanctioned. The king was expected to bring peace, prosperity and justice among all clans and protect the kingdom from external threats. Some legends suggested Imana tested kings through trials to prove their value.

- Gihanga is considered the legendary founder of the Kingdom of Rwanda, said to have introduced key aspects of the great lakes civilisations, namely cattle, metalworking, woodworking, pottery and ingobyi (a stretcher made of papyrus). Gihanga is said to have ruled from his palace in the forest of Buhganga and had a son and a daughter. After his death was believed to be succeeded by his son, Kanyarwanda Gahima.

== Balladry ==
Rwandan folklore balladry is deeply rooted in oral tradition and encompasses various forms of poetic and musical expression such as:

- Ibitekerezo, epic poems performed at the royal court, often telling the history of Rwandan dynasties in poetic form.
- Indirimbo, songs with free rhythm such as igihozo (lullabies and love songs), work songs (e.g. farming, traveling, beekeeping, blacksmithing), amahigi (hunting songs or pastoral songs praising cows)

The traditional instruments that would accompany could be: Inanga (zither), ikembe (lamellophone), umuduri (musical bow), indingiti (fiddle) or ihembe (horn) with the percussion of ingoma drums, rattles, bells, whistles.

== Proverbs and superstitions ==
Both Rwandan proverbs (Imigani) and superstitions exist not only from folklore, but also remain in contemporary society, while proverbs differ in that it's used as guiding principles of life to all generations, while superstitions mainly reside with older Rwandans (with exceptions). A few non-religious proverbs are listed below:

- Inda y’ûndi ítèra indûrú ntibábimenye — The other’s belly cries and no one hears it — Others suffering is hard to recognize
- Ùrusha nyina w’ûmwâna imbabázi aba ashâka kumúlya — The one who professes more compassion than a mother, tries to eat the child — No-one is more compassionate than a mother.
- Injunga y’úrulími inèsha injunga z’îgitèro — The sharpness of the tongue defeats the sharpness of the warriors — Language is more powerful than weapons.
- Mayènya ímenya isuku ishyize ímbere alíko ntîmenya úmwanda isize ínyuma — The slug is aware of the cleanliness ahead, never the dirt left behind — True knowledge takes care of everything, it's ignorant to only pay attention to what you can see.
- Agacúmu kazâguhòrera ntûmenyá uwagácuze — You never know the name of the one who will make the spade that will avenge you — The future is always uncertain.

=== Superstitions ===
- A women should never call her father-in-law by name — A deeply rooted cultural norm tied with modesty.
- Whistling is a taboo, especially at night — Very common belief and is strongly discouraged.
- Never tell a fable during the daytime — Well-known storytelling rule in Rwanda, storytelling is reserved for night and telling them in the day may be seen to bring misfortune.
- Never cut your nails at night — Believed to invite bad luck or criminal tendencies.

== Legends ==
- The flying basket of Gisaka and Ibimanuka — A mysterious tale about a flying basket which arrived bearing visitors believed to be from another realm (Ibimanuka) who were said to give gifts. The story originates from Gisaka, an eastern kingdom which would eventually be absorbed into the kingdom of Rwanda.
