= Mythology of Antigua and Barbuda =

The mythology of Antigua and Barbuda comprises the body of traditional stories and other oral traditions in the archipelago. Stories from Antiguan and Barbudan mythology have inspired many of the islands' folktales and national consciousness.

== Myth and history ==
There are several widespread myths relating to the history of Antigua and Barbuda. It is commonly believed that prior to European colonisation, the islands were inhabited by the Ciboney during the Archaic period, later being replaced by the supposedly-violent Kalinago and peace-loving Arawak. Unlike some other myths, these ideas continue to be treated as fact by many Antiguans and Barbudans and are even occasionally published in historical textbooks. In Barbuda, it is believed that the Codrington family used the island as a slave-breeding colony or nursery to provide their Antiguan plantations, namely Betty's Hope, with a strong and healthy workforce.

== Myth and religion ==
Antigua and Barbuda is a predominantly Protestant country. However, influences from West African spiritual traditions continue to persist. These include the belief in jumbees, ghosts that are believed to primarily roam in the bush and in graveyards. Obeah, an Afro-Caribbean spell-casting practice, was also widespread. Many also believed that following birth, the placenta had to be buried in one's yard and the umbilical cord placed in a coal pot. It is also said that Nyame, the supreme god of the Akan, once held all stories and tales, but Anansi desperately wanted to be the centre of his own. Anansi went to the god and offered to buy his stories, but was instead instructed to complete a series of noble tasks: killing the hornets, the pythons, and the leopards. After delivering the leopard to the god, a task that many warriors could not fulfill, he is said to have been granted his very own story by the god.
