= Washoe traditional narratives =

Washoe traditional narratives include myths, legends, tales, and oral histories preserved by the Washoe people of the Lake Tahoe and surrounding Sierra Nevada area of eastern California and western Nevada.

Washoe oral literature is most closely related to that of the Washoe's Numic neighbors.(See also Traditional narratives (Native California).)

== On-Line Examples of Washoe Narratives ==
- The North American Indian by Edward S. Curtis (1926)

== Sources for Washoe Narratives ==
- Curtis, Edward S. 1907–1930. The North American Indian. 20 vols. Plimpton Press, Norwood, Massachusetts. (Five myths collected from Captain Pete, vol. 15, pp. 149–156.)
- Dangberg, Grace. 1927. "Washo Texts". University of California Publications in American Archaeology and Ethnology 22:391-443. Berkeley. (Recorded in 1919–1920.)
- Dangberg, Grace. 1968. Washo Tales. Nevada State Museum, Carson City.
- Downs, James F. 1966. The Two Worlds of the Washo: An Indian Tribe of California and Nevada. Holt, Rinehart and Winston, New York. (General characterization of Washoe myths, pp. 60–63.)
- James, George Wharton. 1915. The Lake of the Sky: Lake Tahoe, in the High Sierras of California and Nevada. G. W. James, Pasadena. (Includes a version of the Theft of Fire myth, pp. 50–51.)
- Lowie, Robert H. 1939. "Ethnographic Notes on the Washo". University of California Publications in American Archaeology and Ethnology 36:301-352. Berkeley. (Myths and tales collected in 1926, pp. 333–351.)
