= Imana =

East African creator god

Imana is the creator deity in the traditional Banyarwanda and Barundi religion in Rwanda and Burundi and other related ethnic groups, such as Baha in Tanzania and Banyamulenge in the Democratic Republic of Congo. In current-day usage, the term refers to God as found in Christianity. Ancient Banyarwanda and Barundi believed in one god, the creator Imana. In their mythology, Imana was the creator and the supporter of all the Barundi and Banyarwanda people. Imana was seen as almighty and gracious, intervening in one of the legends in an altercation between a man who had always borrowed beans from different people but wriggled out of repaying the debt.

Imana ruled all living things and gave them immortality by hunting an animal known as Death. Death was a savage wild animal who represented the state of death. While Imana was hunting, everybody was told to stay hidden so that Death would have nobody to kill or take refuge to. But one day while he was hunting, an old woman crept out into her vegetable garden to get vegetables. Death quickly hid under her skirt and was taken inside the house with her. She died because of Death. Three days after the funeral of the old woman, the old woman's daughter-in-law, who hated her, saw cracks where she was buried as if she would arise and live again. She filled the cracks with dirt and pounded the earth with a heavy pestle and cried "Stay dead!" Two days later she did the same thing when she saw more cracks by the grave. Three days later there were no cracks left for her to pound dirt into. This signified the end of man's chances of coming back to life. Death had become endemic or constantly present. Another legend says that Imana punished the woman by letting Death live with man.

Imana does not "interfere in the normal course of material nature".

Many Rwandan Christians view the Christian God as synonymous with the traditional Rwandan god Imana.
