= Coast Miwok traditional narratives =

Coast Miwok traditional narratives include myths, legends, tales, and oral histories preserved by the Coast Miwok people of the central California coast immediately north of San Francisco Bay.

Coast Miwok oral literature shares many characteristics of central California narratives, including that of their linguistic kinsmen the Lake, Plains, and Sierra Miwok, as well as other groups.

== On-line examples of Coast Miwok narratives ==
- The Dawn of the World by C. Hart Merriam (1908)
