= Ho-Chunk mythology =

The Hocągara (Ho-Chungara) or Hocąks (Ho-Chunks) are a Siouan-speaking Native American Nation originally from Wisconsin and northern Illinois. Due to forced emigration in the 19th century, they now constitute two individual tribes; the Ho-Chunk Nation of Wisconsin and the Winnebago Tribe of Nebraska. They are most closely related to the Chiwere peoples (the Iowa, Otoe, and Missouria), and more distantly to the Dhegiha (Quapaw, Kansa, Omaha, Ponca, and Osage).

== Migration myth ==
In the story that follows, the Bear Clan assumes the foundation role for the whole nation, and when they land they find the nation's friendship tribe, the Menominee. The Bear Clan is strongly associated with the kaǧi, a term that denotes the raven and northern crow. It is also the name by which the Hocągara know the Menominee.

On account of his vision, a great Menominee (Kaǧi) chief commanded that all manner of supplies be assembled at a white sand beach on Lake Michigan. And when all this had been done and set in order, as the sun reached its zenith the vision came to life: in the pure blue sky of the eastern horizon a single dark cloud began to form and move irresistibly towards them. It was a great flock of ravens (kaǧi), spirit birds with rainbow plumage of iridescent colors. The instant that the first of these landed, he materialized into a naked, kneeling man. The Menominee chief said to his people, "Give this man clothing, for he is a chief." And the others landed in like fashion, and were given great hospitality. They were the Hocąk nation, and that is how they came to Red Banks.

Red Banks (Wisconsin) is the traditional homeland of the Hocąk Nation. It is situated on Green Bay, which the Hocągara called Te-rok, the "Within Lake". Lake Michigan as a whole was called Te-šišik, "Bad Lake", which may well have led the Algonquian peoples round about Lake Winnebago to call them "the people of the Bad Waters", or Winnibégo in Menominee.

== Trickster tales ==
Trickster tales played a major role in the Winnebago tribe. These stories were passed down orally and depicted humorous lessons through animals, nature and trickery. For example, "The Trickster and Talking Bulb" tells the story of "The Old Man", who disregards the warnings of a bulb and, in turn, gets punished for his defiance. The trickster later learns to respect nature and not go against it.

== Red Horn ==
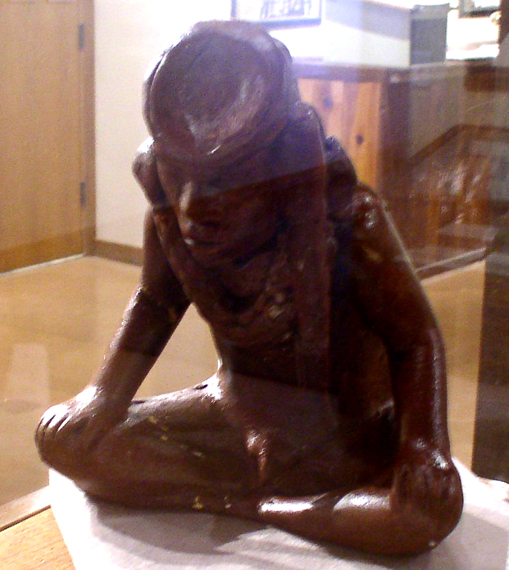
A stone pipe bowl nicknamed "Big Boy" that some archaeologists think may depict Red Horn. It was found at the Spiro Site.

Red Horn (also known as 'He Who Wears (Human) Faces on His Ears') is found in the oral traditions of the Iowa, and Ho-Chunk (whose ethnology was recorded by anthropologist Paul Radin, 1908–1912). The Red Horn Cycle depicts his adventures with Turtle, the thunderbird Storms-as-He-Walks (Mą’e-manįga) and others who contest a race of giants, the Wąge-rucge or "Man-Eaters", who have been killing human beings whom Red Horn has pledged to help. Red Horn eventually took a red haired giant woman as a wife. Archaeologists have speculated that Red Horn is a mythic figure in Mississippian art, represented on a number of Southeastern Ceremonial Complex (SECC) artifacts. Hall has shown that the mythic cycle of Red Horn and his sons has some interesting analogies with the Hero Twins mythic cycle of Mesoamerica.

== Creation of the sun and evil ==
Herešgúnina is the Ho-Chunk solar deity. According to myth he was born with his legs backwards, so he deigned to create evil creatures like crawfish and grizzly bears as well as gambling. He was then confronted and his head decapitated, forming the solar disk.

== See also ==
- Native American mythology
- Ho-Chunk
- Winnebago language
- Winnebago War
- Doty Island (Wisconsin)
- Native American tribes in Nebraska
