= Ottawa oral literature and texts =

Traditional Ottawa stories fall into two general categories, aasookaan 'legend, sacred story' (plural aasookaanag) and dbaajmowin 'narrative, story' (plural dbaajmownan). Stories in the aasookaan category involve mythical characters such as Nenbozh. Stories in the dbaajmowin category include traditional stories that do not necessarily involve mythical characters, with the same term also used more generally to refer to any type of story not in the aasookaan category. Published Ottawa text material includes a range of genres, including historical narratives, stories of conflict with other indigenous groups, humorous stories, and others.

== Text ==
Ottawa speaker Andrew Medler dictated the following text while he was working with Leonard Bloomfield in a linguistic field methods class at the Linguistic Institute of the Linguistic Society of America, held during the summer of 1938 at the University of Michigan in Ann Arbor, Michigan. Medler grew up near Saginaw, Michigan but spent most of his life at Walpole Island. The texts that Medler dictated were originally published in a linguistically oriented transcription using phonetic symbols, and have been republished in the modern orthography, with analysis.

Love Medicine
Andrew Medler

(1) Ngoding kiwenziinh ngii-noondwaaba a-dbaajmod wshkiniigkwen gii-ndodmaagod iw wiikwebjigan.
Once I heard an old man tell of how a young woman asked him for love medicine.

(2) Wgii-msawenmaan niw wshkinwen.
She was in love with a young man.

(3) Mii dash niw kiwenziinyan gii-ndodmawaad iw wiikwebjigan, gye go wgii-dbahmawaan.
So then she asked that old man for the love medicine, and she paid him for it.

(4) Mii dash gii-aabjitood maaba wshkiniigkwe iw mshkiki gaa-giishpnadood.
Then this young woman used that medicine that she had bought.

(5) Mii dash maaba wshkinwe gaa-zhi-gchi-zaaghaad niw wshkiniigkwen.
Then this young man accordingly very much loved that young woman.

(6) Gye go mii gii-wiidgemaad, gye go mii wiiba gii-yaawaawaad binoojiinyan.
Then he married her; very soon they had children.

(7) Aapji go gii-zaaghidwag gye go gii-maajiishkaawag.
They loved each other and they fared very well.

== Analysis of text ==
Below is an interlinear glossing and analysis of the words in each sentence, with lines of analysis being vertically aligned on a word-by-word basis. For each sentence the first line presents the text, the second presents a morphological analysis, the third line presents a translation of the elements identified in line 2, and the fourth line presents a word-by-word translation. A more detailed morphological analysis is also available. A table of codes for grammatical elements used in interlinear glossing occurs after the glossed sentences.

In the first line the hyphen '-' is used to mark the division between a preverb and an immediately following verb, as in Sentence 1: ngii-noondwaaba 'I heard it,' with past tense preverb gii-; or a preverb followed by another preverb, as in Sentence 5, gaa-zhi-gchi-zaaghaad, where the first two hyphens indicate the boundaries between preverbs, and the third hyphen indicates the boundary between a preverb and a verb. In the second line, where morphological analysis is presented, the hyphen marks the start of a suffix, as in wshkiniigkwe-n 'young.man' followed by Obviative suffix -n. Also in the second line, the marker '=' indicates the boundary between a verb and a following verb or preverb.

Sentence 1

| (1) | Ngoding | kiwenziinh | ngii-noondwaaba | | | | | a-dbaajmod | | | wshkiniigkwen | | gii-ndodmaagod | | | | iw | wiikwebjigan |
| (2) | ngoding | kiwenziinh | n- | gii= | noondaw | -aa | -ba | a= | dbaajmo- | -d | wshkiniigkwe- | -n | gii= | ndodmaw- | -igw | -d | iw | wiikwebjigan |
| (3) | once | old.man | 1 | PAST | hear NA | DIR | PRET | PV.CNJ | tell.story | CNJ.3 | young.woman | OBV | PAST | ask NA for NI | INV | CNJ.3 | that | love.medicine |
| (4) | Once | old man | I heard him | | | | | he says | | | young woman | | he asked the other for | | | | that | love medicine |

Sentence 2

| (1) | Wgii-msawenmaan | | | | | niw | wshkinwen | |
| (2) | w- | gii= | msawenm- | -aa- | -n | niw | wshkinwe | -n |
| (3) | 3 | PAST | desire NA | DIR | OBV | that.NA.OBV | young.man | OBV |
| (4) | She desired him | | | | | that one | young man | |

Sentence 3

| (1) | Mii | dash | niw | kiwenziinyan | | gii-dodamaagod | | | | iw | wiikwebjigan, | gye | go | wgii-dbahmawaan | | | | |
| (2) | mii | dash | niw | kiwenziinh | -an | gii= | dodamaw- | -igw | -d | iw | wiikwebjigan | gye | go | w- | gii= | dbahmaw- | -aa | -an |
| (3) | so | then | that.NA | old.man | OBV | PV.PAST | do so to NA | INV | CNJ.3 | that.NI | love.medicine | and | emphatic | 3 | PV.PAST | pay NI to NA | DIR | OBV |
| (4) | So | then | that one | old man | | she asked him for it | | | | that | love medicine, | and | emphatic | she paid him for it | | | | |

Sentence 4

| (1) | Mii | dash | gii-aabjitood | | | maaba | wshkiniigkwe | iw | mshkiki | gaa-giishpnadood | | |
| (2) | mii | dash | gii= | aabjitoo- | -d | maaba | wshkiniigkwe | iw | mshkiki | gaa= | giishpnadoo- | -d |
| (3) | so | then | PV.PAST | use NI | CNJ.3 | this NA | young.woman | that NI | medicine | IC.PAST | buy NI | CNJ.3 |
| (4) | So | then | she used it | | | this | young woman | that | medicine | that she bought | | |

Sentence 5

| (1) | Mii | dash | maaba | wshkinwe | gaa-zhi-gchi-zaaghaad | | | | | | niw | wshkiniigkwen | |
| (2) | mii | dash | maaba | wshkinwe | gaa= | zhi= | gchi= | zaagh- | -aa | -d | niw | wshkiniigkwe- | -n |
| (3) | so | then | this NA | young.man | IC.PAST | thus | very | love NA | DIR | CNJ.3 | that NA | young.woman | OBV |
| (4) | So | then | this one | young man | he very much loved her | | | | | | that one | young woman | |

Sentence 6

| (1) | Gye | go | mii | gii-wiidgemaad, | | | | gye | go | mii | wiiba | gii-yaawaawaad | | | | | binoojiinyan | |
| (2) | gye | go | mii | gii= | wiidgem- | -aa | -d | gye | go | mii | wiiba | gii= | yaaw- | -aa | -waa | -d | binoojiinh | -an |
| (3) | and | emphatic | so | PAST | marry NA | DIR | CNJ.3 | and | emphatic | so | soon | PV.PAST | have NA | DIR | CNJ.PL.3 | CNJ.3 | child | OBV |
| (4) | And | indeed | so | he married her | | | | and | indeed | so | soon | they had | | | | | children | |

Sentence 7

| (1) | Aapji | go | gii-zaaghidwag | | | gye | go | gii-maajiishkaawag | | |
| (2) | aapji | go | gii= | zaaghidi- | -wag | gye | go | gii= | maajiishkaa- | -wag |
| (3) | very | emphatic | PV.PAST | love.each.other | PL.NA | and | emphatic | PV.PAST | fare.well | PL.NA |
| (4) | Very much | indeed | they loved each other | | | and | indeed | they fared very well | | |

The following table lists codes used in the interlinear analysis of the text.

| Code | Gloss | Code | Gloss |
|---|---|---|---|
| 1 | First person | NI | Inanimate gender |
| 3 | Third person | OBV | Obviative form of noun |
| CNJ | Conjunct form of verb | PAST | Past tense preverb |
| DIR | Direct inflection of verb | PL | Plural |
| IC | Initial Change | PRET | Preterit mode |
| INV | Inverse form of verb | PV | Preverb element occurring before verb |
| NA | Animate gender | | |
