= Northern Paiute traditional narratives =

Northern Paiute traditional narratives include myths, legends, tales, and oral histories preserved by the Northern Paiute people of the Great Basin deserts of western Nevada, eastern California, and southeastern Oregon in the United States of America.

Northern Paiute oral literature is similar to that of the group's Numic kinsmen, the Mono, Shoshone, and Southern Paiute. (See also Traditional narratives (Native California).)

== Online examples of Northern Paiute narratives ==
- The North American Indian by Edward S. Curtis (1926)

== Sources for Northern Paiute narratives ==
- Bright, William. (1993). A Coyote Reader. University of California Press, Berkeley. (A narrative based on Ramsey 1973, pp. 37–38.)
- Curtis, Edward S. (1907–1930). The North American Indian. 20 vols. Norwood, Massachusetts: Plimpton Press. (Six myths collected from Blind Tom (Walker River) and Billy Williams (Honey Lake), vol.15, pp. 129–149.)
- Fowler, Don D., and Catherine S. Fowler. (1971). Anthropology of the Numa: John Wesley Powell's Manuscripts on the Numic Peoples of Western North America, 1868-1880. Smithsonian Contributions to Anthropology No. 14. Washington, D.C. (Northern Paiute myths, pp. 218–229, 242, 246–248.)
- Kelly, Isabel T. (1938). "Northern Paiute Tales," Journal of American Folklore 51:363-438. (Narratives, including "Bear and Fawns," collected in 1930.)
- Lowie, Robert H. (1924). "Shoshonean Tales", Journal of American Folklore 37:1-242. (Northern Paiute narratives, including "Theft of Fire," collected in 1914, pp. 200–242.)
- Marsden, W. L. (1923). "The Northern Paiute Language of Oregon", University of California Publications in American Archaeology and Ethnology 20:175-191. Berkeley. (Traditional narratives, pp. 181–191.)
- Ramsey, Jarold. (1977). Coyote Was Going There: Indian Literature of the Oregon Country. University of Washington Press, Seattle. (20 narratives published by Kelly and Marsden, pp. 231–259.)
- Steward, Julian H. (1936). "Myths of the Owens Valley Paiute", University of California Publications in American Archaeology and Ethnology 34:355-440. Berkeley. (Five Mono Lake Paiute myths, pp. 428–433.)
- Steward, Julian H. (1943). "Some Western Shoshoni Myths", Bureau of American Ethnology Bulletin 136:249-299. Washington, D.C. (Three short myths collected in 1935 in Winnemucca, pp. 260, 297–299.)
