= Architectural mythology =

Symbolism in architecture, or architecture in mythology

The Tower of Babel by Pieter Bruegel the Elder (1563)

Architectural mythology means the symbolism in real-world architecture, as well as the architecture described in mythological stories. In addition to language, a myth could be represented by a painting, a sculpture, or a building. It is about the overall story of an architectural work, often revealed through art.Mythology and symbolism has been a channel for architects to inject a deeper meaning for an indissoluble amount of time. The power of ancient myths and symbols is controlled to create a bridge between the past and the future. Mythology in architecture is a deliberate strategy, they try to design something timeless and universally relatable. The value of a built environment, therefore, is a conglomerate of its actual physical existence and the historical memories and myths people attach to it, bring to it, and project on it.

Not all stories surrounding an architectural work incorporate a level of myth. These stories can also be well hidden from the casual viewer and are often built into the conceptual design of the architectural statement.

The value of a built environment, therefore, is a conglomerate of its actual physical existence and the historical memories and myths people attach to it, bring to it, and project on it.

— Oliver, P.

== Ancient Greek architecture ==
Before 600 BC worship was done in the open, but when the Greeks began to represent their Gods by large statues, it was necessary to provide a building for this purpose. This led to the development of temples. With the greek god of architecture being Hephaestus (fire, metalworking, craftsmen, sculpture, metallurgy and volcanoes) and the greek goddess associated with architecture being Hestia (architecture, the hearth, and domesticity). The role temples are intended for worship to celebrate their god and receive comfort. But, Ancient Greek temples were meant to serve as homes for the gods and goddesses of that community. Their homes were the finest and came with a staff of servants.

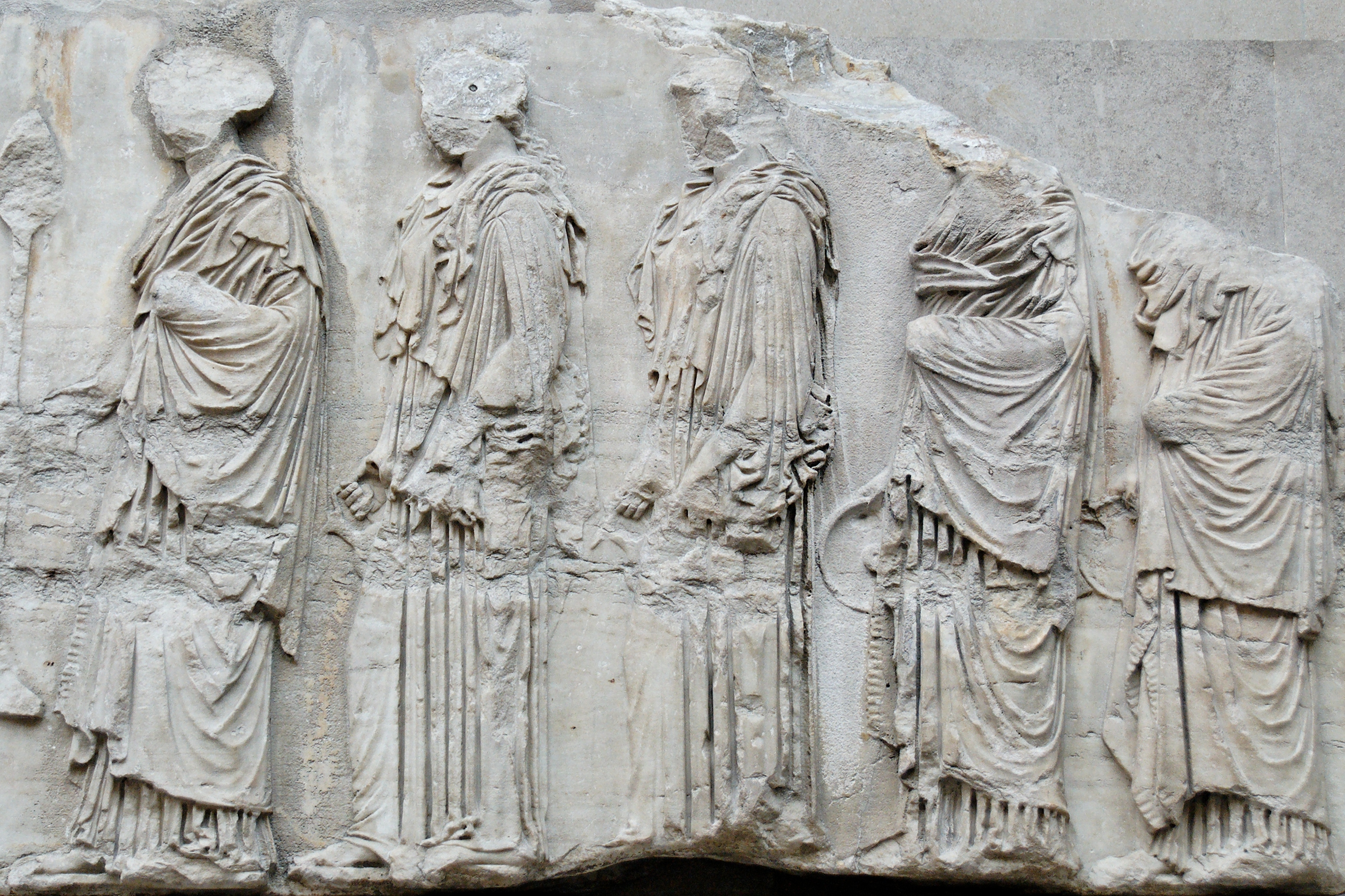
Part of the Parthenon's eastern frieze

The ancient Greek temples were often enhanced with mythological decorations from the columns to the roof. The architectural functions of the temple mainly concentrated on the cella with the cult statue. The architectural elaboration served to stress the dignity of the cella.These statues of the god or goddess were usually represented standing up or sitting down in the central space of the temple. The early statues were made of wood and then were transitioned to be made out of stone or cast bronze. Two of the finest statues for temples built was the statue of Zeus at Olympia or Athena at the Parthenon, they were both a combination of gold and ivory with Zeus been considered as one of the seven wonder of the ancient world.

The Parthenon is a greek temple located in Athens that was built in dedication to the greek goddess of wisdom, war, handicraft, and practical reason Athena.The Parthenon was a symbol of the Athenians' devotion and gratitude to her. At a time when the Athenians wanted to showcase their strength, civilization, and heroism to the world, the Parthenon’s sculptural reliefs reinforced these ideals. The South, West, and North sides of the Parthenon frieze show a procession of human figures. The East side contains Greek gods in various positions. The gods on the left side of the frieze tend to have stronger associations with the underworld while the gods on the right reside over spheres of fertility and optimism. This creates a story of life and death across the East Frieze.

== Ancient Egyptian Architecture ==
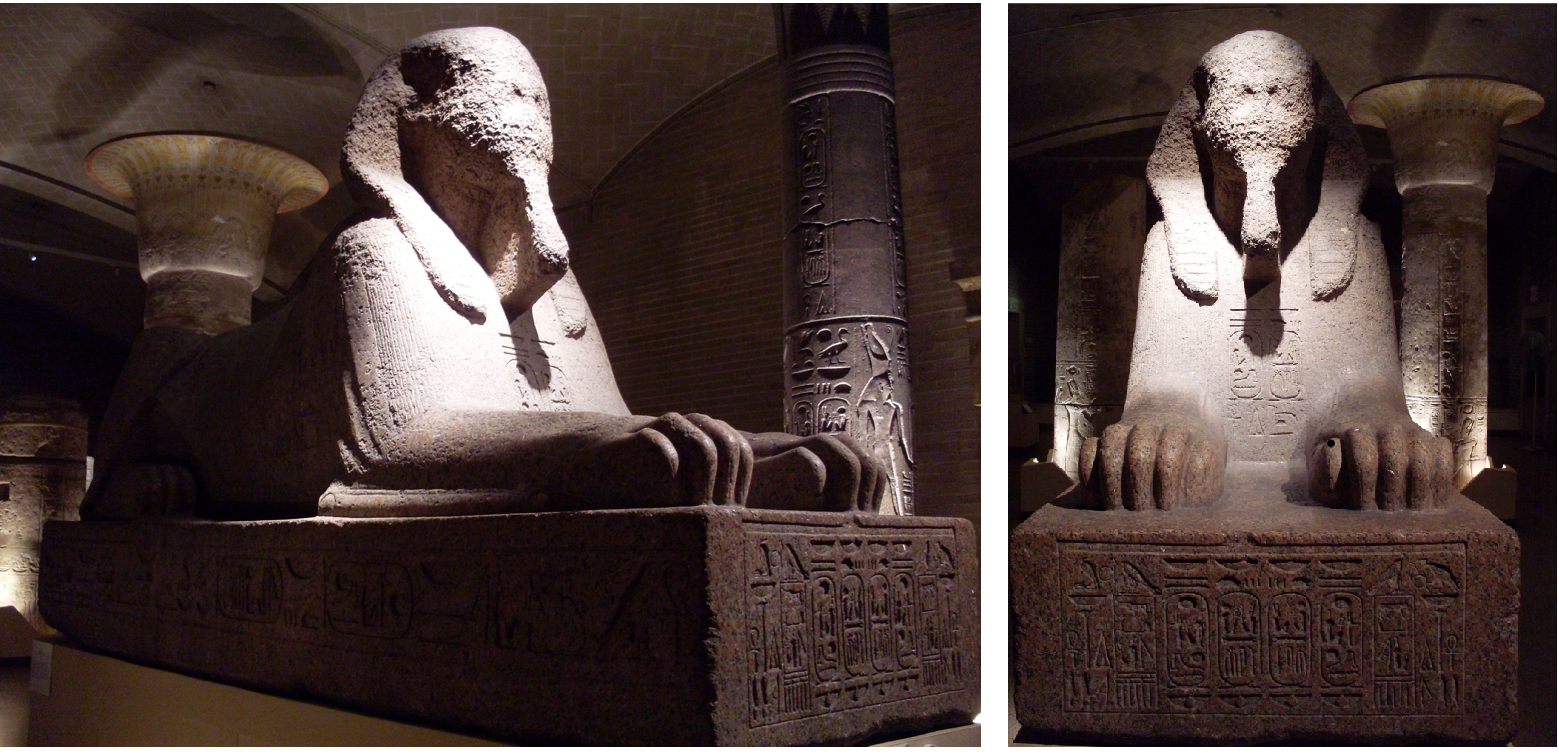
Sphinx guardian of ruler Ramses II

The great pyramids are an architectural feat constructed as a means to house the remains of ancient Egyptian rulers. Inscribed on the interior pyramid walls are hieroglyphic texts describing the afterlife and ancient Egyptian mythology. There are as many as 900 individual compositions in each pyramid. The pyramid's smooth, angled sides symbolized the rays of the sun and were designed to help the king's soul ascend to heaven and join the gods, particularly the sun god Ra. It was believed by ancient Egyptians that when a king died part of his spirit remained in his body and later mummified to care for the spirit. The Spetted pyramid became known as the royal burial grounds.

The sphinx was a mythical creature with the body of a lion and head of a man wearing a pharaoh headdress. The lion symbolizes strength, power, and the protection give nature to the pharaohs, it is considered a powerful guardian of the scared and royal realms. The human head symbolizes wisdom and intelligence. The position of the sphinx facing east towards the rising sun symbolizes the pharaoh’s role as the mediator between the gods and the people, and his connection to the sun god Ra. Sphinx statues were commonly found in or near ancient Egyptian temples and tombs. Sphinx statues were commonly found in or near ancient Egyptian temples and tombs. The sphinx was thought to be a guardian for the ancient rulers of Egypt. These sphinxes like the pyramids had inscriptions on their bases and bodies. These inscriptions were references to the Egyptian gods such as Horus, Nekhbet, Wadjet and many others.

- Horus : Egyptian deity and pharaoh who represented the sky, sun, kingship, healing, and protection

- Nekhbet : Egyptian goddess who protected the pharaohs, queens, children, pregnant people, and the dead

- Wadjet : Goddess of serpents, the Nile Delta, the land of the living, and protector of Egyptian kings

== Ancient Roman Architecture ==
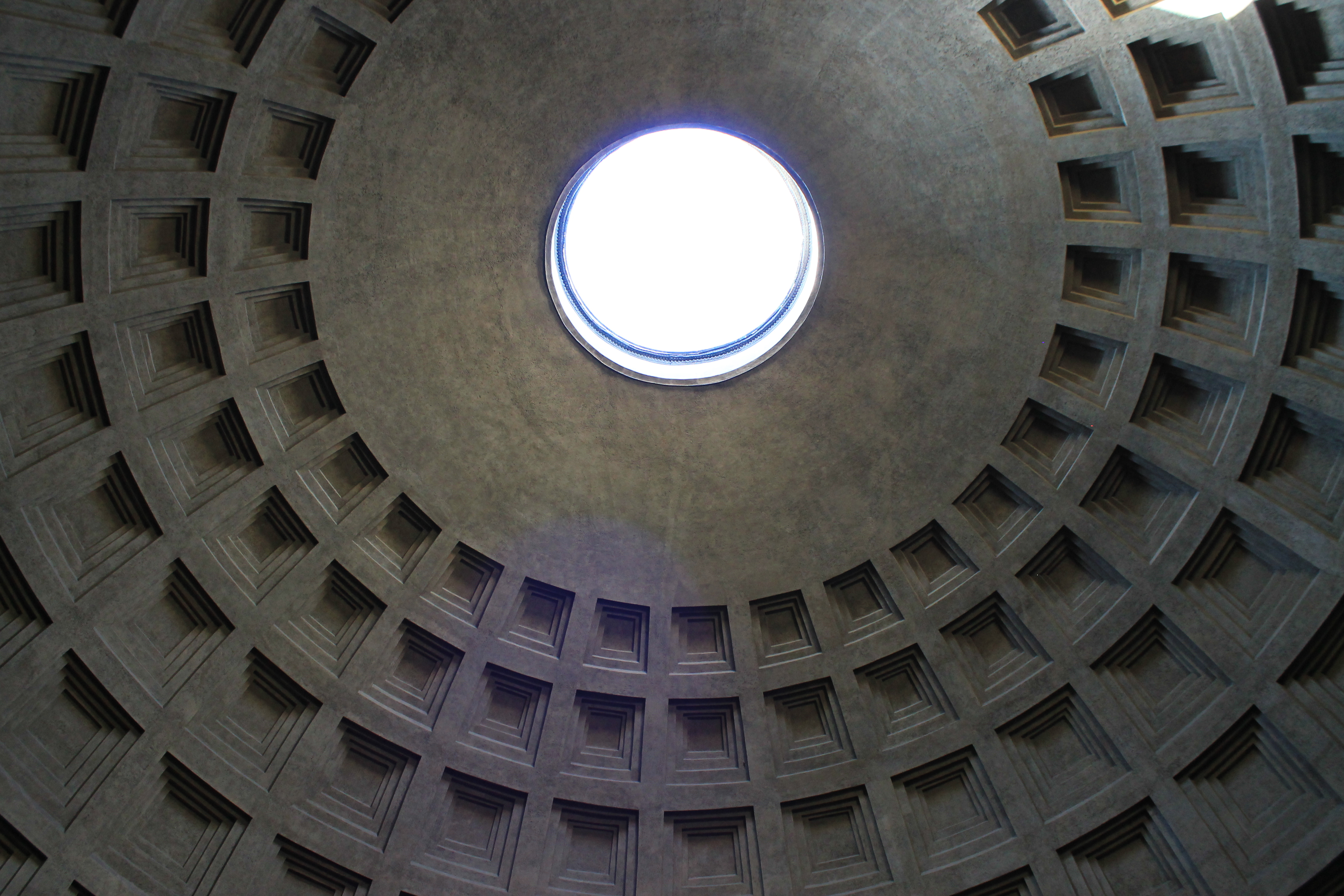
Interior view of the Pantheon showing the oculus of the building

Many ancient Roman temples were constructed for religious purposes. The most influential example is the Pantheon. Pantheon is a Greek adjective meaning “honor all Gods”, in fact it was first built as a temple to all gods. According to Roman legend, the original Pantheon was constructed on the very site where Romulus, their mythological founder, ascended to heaven. However, most historians attribute the first Pantheon, built in 27 BC, to Agrippa, a close associate of Emperor Augustus. The Pantheon serves as the final resting place for the famed artist Raphael, as well as several Italian kings and poets.

While there is very little surviving written information about the building historian Cassius Dio remarked:

Perhaps it has this name because, among the statues which embellished it, there were those of many gods, including Mars and Venus; but my own opinion on the origin of the name is that, because of its vaulted roof, it actually resembles the heavens.

== See also ==
- Folly

== Books ==
- Giedion, S.: The Beginnings of Architecture: The Eternal Present: A Contribution on Constancy and Change, New Jersey: Princeton University Press, 1981
- Lethaby, William Richard: Architecture, Mysticism and Myth Cosimo (first published 1892), English, 288 pages, ISBN 1-59605-380-1 (Online PDF)
- Mann, A.: Sacred Architecture, Shaftesbury: Element, 1993
- Donald E. Strong, The Classical World, Paul Hamlyn, London (1965)
