= Lake Miwok traditional narratives =

Histories preserved by the Lake Miwok people of Clear Lake, California, U.S.

Lake Miwok traditional narratives include myths, legends, tales, and oral histories preserved by the Lake Miwok people of Clear Lake in the North Coast Range of northwestern California.

Lake Miwok oral literature shows similarities to that of the Pomo and other neighboring groups in the North Coast region.

== Online examples of Lake Miwok narratives ==
- "The Dawn of the World" by C. Hart Merriam (1910)

== Sources for Lake Miwok narratives ==
- Callaghan, Catherine A. 1978. "Fire, Flood, and Creation (Lake Miwok". In Coyote Stories, edited by William Bright, pp. 62-86. International Journal of American Linguistics Native American Texts Series No. 1. University of Chicago Press. (Narrated by James Knight in 1958.)
- Freeland, Lucy S. 1947. "Western Miwok Texts with Linguistic Sketch". International Journal of American Linguistics 13:31-46. (One myth collected from Maggie Johnson.)
- Gifford, Edward Winslow, and Gwendoline Harris Block. 1930. California Indian Nights. Arthur H. Clark, Glendale, California. (Five previously published narratives, pp. 99-100, 121-124, 145-149, 154-156, 274-278.)
- Loeb, Edwin M. 1932. "The Western Kuksu Cult". University of California Publications in American Archaeology and Ethnology 33:1-137. Berkeley. (Brief note on mythology, p. 119.)
- Luthin, Herbert W. 2002. Surviving through the Days: A California Indian Reader. University of California Press, Berkeley. (Orpheus myth collected in 1980 from James Knight by Catherine Callaghan, pp. 334-342.)
- Merriam, C. Hart. 1910. The Dawn of the World: Myths and Weird Tales Told by the Mewan Indians of California. Arthur H. Clark, Cleveland, Ohio. Reprinted as The Dawn of the World: Myths and Tales of the Miwok Indians of California, in 1993 with an introduction by Lowell J. Bean, University of Nebraska Press, Lincoln. (Several narratives.)
