= Western Shoshone traditional narratives =

Histories preserved by the Western Shoshone people

Western Shoshone traditional narratives include myths, legends, tales, and oral histories preserved by the Western Shoshone people of eastern California and western Nevada.

Western Shoshone oral literature shares many of its narratives with the Western Shoshone's Numic kinsmen in the Great Basin, the Mono, Northern Paiute, Southern Paiute, and Kawaiisu. (See also Traditional narratives (Native California).)

== Sources for Western Shoshone Narratives ==
- Steward, Julian H. 1936. "Myths of the Owens Valley Paiute". University of California Publications in American Archaeology and Ethnology 34:355-440. Berkeley. (Four Lone Pine Shoshone myths including Theft of Fire, pp. 434-436.)
- Steward, Julian H. 1943. "Some Western Shoshoni Myths". Bureau of American Ethnology Bulletin 136:249-299. Washington, D.C. (Myths from Saline Valley, Panamint Valley, and Death Valley, including Theft of Fire, collected in 1935.)
- Zigmond, Maurice. 1980. Kawaiisu Mythology: An Oral Tradition of South-Central California. Ballena Press Anthropological Papers No. 18. Menlo Park, California. (Five Panamint myths, including Theft of Fire, collected from Panamint George, Andy Shoshone, and Johnnie Shoshone in the 1930s, pp. 221-236.)
