= Chaná mythology =

Chaná mythology is a set of stories and beliefs of Chaná people about the world that they live in.

== Deities and cosmogony ==
Tijuiném, also written as Tihuinem (or am tihuinem u-gil), is the god of Chanás, to whom the father of gods put in charge of the mission to populate the mother earth, until then uncultivated, to create the Chanás and other living beings, animals and plants. It gives them a language, a set of social rules and the duty to respect the nature and Tijuiném as their god.

According to their mythology, Chanás came from a mythical place named timucó (or timujú), far away in the north and where in the distant past their ancestors lived. From there, they travelled until they reached the region surrounding the Paraná and Uruguay rivers near their mouths.

== Myths of creation ==
=== Mythological origin of animals ===
Adá verá ug atá or freshwater rays according to a Chaná legend, they appeared when a woman who killed her children crushing them on the shores of rivers was punished by the gods because of her actions, transforming her into a flattened fish as she left her children.

Amarí dul (flying flower) or butterfly, according the legend, they would appear after the story of a child girl of a Chaná community, of kind-hearted nature, who took care and healed animals and plants. Because of that she was nicknamed nam nado (caress). One day, the girl, who was usually cultivating a garden together with her sisters, was bitten by a viper. She, as she had a feeling she was going to die, asked to be buried with her flowers, but the community rules did not allow in that way in order to protect mother earth, but the bodies of deceased children should first be moved in a resting canoe, put over a tree of a forest in order to allow their soul to reach the stars, and after that, bury their bodies. But Tijuiném felt sorry for her and made the flowers from girl's garden transform into butterflies to fly around her resting cradle to accompany her during her transition.

Ndiní lantéc ("talking bird") or parrot, would have been a person responsible of guard but because he was very talkative, he did not fulfill his duty and let the enemy perform an attack. Therefore, a Tijuiném's messenger spirit punished him by transforming him into that bird.

=== Mythological origin of plants ===
Corú or cockspur coral tree was born where a hunchback person was buried following this person's death after having heroically helped and defended Chanás.

== Mythological creatures ==
=== Mythical navy of fishes ===
Almost every fish was considered part of a mythical navy fighting against the piranha, considered evil due to their nature.

- Ichí lantéc or Raphael catfish, was the Captain fish of the mythical navy, distinguished by its strength and armor, with lateral scales, who "talk" when is taken out of the water.
- Ichí agó utú dioí or dorado, is a Captain fish assistant to the Captain General of the navy of fishes.
- Ichí añí or Pimelodus maculatus, has the same rank as the dorado, and is distinguished because it "talks" (due to the noise it makes when it is pulled out of the water) to the other fishes giving them instructions. Its fish bones are its spears of war.
- Agútꞌó ug atá or yacare caiman, is part of the mythical navy of fishes as a private soldier, created by god to punish the piranha.
- Ichí abaé revá or streaked prochilod, is a fish of lesser importance in the chain of command of the mythical navy because it lacks any offensive or defensive means.

=== Other creatures ===
Tijuí taé or demon is an evil spirit who could not be seen in plain sight, but it could get into persons' minds to talk to them and convince them to commit evil deeds.

Nem or spirits of deceased persons could ascend to the sky or remain on Earth to take care of living people or to torment them. They would appear during the nights and could send messages from god to the living people's dreams.

== See also ==
- Chaná language
- Guarani mythology
- Pre-Columbian cultures

== Bibliography ==
- Jaime, Blas Wilfredo Omar; Viegas Barros, José Pedro (2013). La Lengua Chaná: Patrimonio Cultural de Entre Rïos. Paraná: Editorial de Entre Ríos. ISBN 978-950-686-039-4.
