= Plains and Sierra Miwok traditional narratives =

Plains Miwok and Sierra Miwok traditional narratives include myths, legends, tales, and oral histories preserved by the Miwok people of the central California, specifically those of Sacramento Valley and Sierra Mountains. These Miwoks are the linguistically related speakers of the Plains and Sierra Miwok languages and their descendants. At the time of European entry, local groups that spoke these languages participated in the general cultural pattern of central California.

The record of Sierra Miwok oral literature is one of the most extensive in the state (see the Sources section below). The record of Plains Miwok narrative, on the other hand, is quite limited (see the Merriam [1910] citation in the Sources section below).

== On-Line examples of their narratives ==
- The Indians of Yosemite Valley and Vicinity by Galen Clark (1904)
- Indian Myths of South Central California by Alfred L. Kroeber (1907)
- The Dawn of the World by C. Hart Merriam (1910)
- Myths and Legends of California and the Old Southwest by Katharine Berry Judson (1912)
- Miwok Myths by Edward W. Gifford (1917)
- The Lore and the Lure of the Yosemite by Herbert Earl Wilson (1922)
- The North American Indian by Edward S. Curtis (1924)

== Sources for their narratives ==
- Barrett, Samuel A. 1919. "Myths of the Southern Sierra Miwok". University of California Publications in American Archaeology and Ethnology 16:1-28. Berkeley. (Collected in 1906; includes Earth Diver and Theft of Fire.)
- Broadbent, Sylvia M. (1964). The Southern Sierra Miwok Language. University of California Publications in Linguistics. Vol. 38. Berkeley, California.. (Narratives collected in 1955–1961, including Theft of Fire and Bear and Fawns.)
- Clark, Galen. 1904. Indians of the Yosemite Valley and Vicinity: Their History, Customs and Traditions. G. Clark, Yosemite Valley. (Several myths and legends collected in the nineteenth century, pp. 2–5, 78–100.)
- Curtis, Edward S. 1907–1930. The North American Indian. 20 vols. Plimpton Press, Norwood, Massachusetts.(Two myths collected from Huwatpaye, vol. 14, pp. 176–177.)
- Erdoes, Richard, and Alfonso Ortiz. 1984. American Indian Myths and Legends. Pantheon Books, New York. (Retelling of a narrative from Gifford and Block 1930, pp. 216–218.)
- Gifford, Edward Winslow. 1917. "Miwok Myths". University of California Publications in American Archaeology and Ethnology 12:283-338. Berkeley. (Fourteen versions, including Theft of Fire and Bear and Fawns, collected in 1913-1914 from Central Sierra informants William Fuller and Thomas Williams.)
- Gifford, Edward Winslow, and Gwendoline Harris Block. 1930. California Indian Nights. Arthur H. Clark, Glendale, California. (Six previously published narratives, pp. 94–99, 135–136, 205–209, 218–221, 237–240, 263–265.)
- Judson, Katharine Berry. 1912. Myths and Legends of California and the Old Southwest. A. C. McClurg, Chicago. (Three myths, pp. 51–53, 100–103.)
- Kroeber, A. L. 1907. "Indian Myths of South Central California". University of California Publications in American Archaeology and Ethnology 4:167-250. Berkeley. (Southern Sierra Miwok myths, including Earth Diver, Theft of Fire, and Bear and Fawns, pp. 202–204.)
- Latta, Frank F. 1936. California Indian Folklore. F. F. Latta, Shafter, California. (Seven Eastern Miwok narratives, including Theft of Fire, Orpheus, and Bear and Fawns.)
- Margolin, Malcolm. 1993. The Way We Lived: California Indian Stories, Songs, and Reminiscences. First edition 1981. Heyday Books, Berkeley, California. (Two myths, pp. 156–157, from Kroeber 1907 and Barrett 1919.)
- Merriam, C. Hart. 1910. The Dawn of the World: Myths and Weird Tales Told by the Mewan Indians of California. Arthur H. Clark, Cleveland, Ohio. Reprinted as The Dawn of the World: Myths and Tales of the Miwok Indians of California, in 1993 with an introduction by Lowell J. Bean, University of Nebraska Press, Lincoln. (Numerous narratives, including Theft of Fire and Bear and Fawns.)
- Powers, Stephen. 1877. Tribes of California. Contributions to North American Ethnology, vol. 3. Government Printing Office, Washington, D.C. Reprinted with an introduction by Robert F. Heizer in 1976, University of California Press, Berkeley. (Three narratives, pp. 358–360, 366–368.)
- Wilson, Herbert Earl. 1922. The Lore and the Lure of the Yosemite: The Indians, Their Customs, legends, and Beliefs, and the Story of Yosemite. A. M. Robertson, San Francisco. (Romanticized versions of Central Sierra Miwok myths and legends, including Earth Diver, Theft of Fire, and Bear and Fawns, pp. 68–94.)
