= Salishan oral narratives =

Native American oral tradition

Salishan oral narratives consist of the body of traditional narratives of the speakers of the Salishan languages, who inhabit British Columbia, Canada and in Montana, Idaho, Washington, and Oregon in the United States. Each of the many peoples in these groups have their own stories and each storyteller may interpret them in their own ways, but many of the stories of the Salish peoples are similar and share themes and characters, and share their historical origins in the proto-Salishan culture long ago. The earliest descriptions of the oral traditions of the Salishan peoples were the collections of Nuxalk (Bella Coola) mythology by anthropologist Franz Boas.

== Genres ==
Many Salishan peoples distinguish between two basic genres of narrative, one is traditional stories corresponding roughly to what is called myth in English and which takes place in a Myth Age before the arrival of the modern age, in which plants, animals and weather phenomena are anthropomorphized. The other type of stories includes historical accounts and "news" or informational stories. For the Nlaka'pamux of the Fraser Canyon-Nicola regions in British Columbia, the genre of traditional narrative is called sptékʷɬ whereas the informational narrative is called spíləẋm, in Montana Salish (Flathead) the distinction is between sqʷlú(ṁt) and sṁiʔṁíy, and other Salishan languages have similar pairs.

One important difference between Salishan oral traditions and Western literature is that Salishan traditional narratives are not considered to be fictive, or to be the result of the creativity of the narrator, rather they are considered to convey real knowledge of the world as passed down from the elders. The storyteller also does not "own" the story, although the best storytellers do give the narratives a personal flavor. Rather the stories are considered to be pre-existing and to contain all the knowledge of the world. Demonstrating the significance of the traditional narratives, elder Joe Cullooyah of the Montana Salish stated that "Everything you need to know about life is in the Coyote stories — if you just listen carefully", and asked what happened to Coyote of the Coyote narratives, Cullooyah answered "You believe that Christ is coming back some day, right? Well, Coyote is coming back some day, too."

== From the mythology of the Kalispel, an Interior Salish people ==
- In some stories from the Flathead storyteller Lassaw Redhorn and the Kalispel storyteller Domicie Michell the supreme deity is called Amotken, a kind, elderly man who lives alone in heaven. He created five women from five hairs from his head and asked them what they wanted to be. Each gave him a different answer: wickedness and cruelty, goodness, mother of the Earth, fire, water. Amotken did as they asked and declared that wickedness would rule Earth for a time, but goodness would win in the end.

== From the traditions of the Skwxwumesh, a Coast Salish people ==
- In some stories told by Skwxwumesh storyteller Louis Miranda the Basket ogress qálqaliɫ was an ugly old woman/ogress that stole children and carried them away in her basket.
- For a more extensive survey of Skwxwu7mesh oral traditions, please see History of the Squamish people#Oral history and History of the Squamish people#Stories.

== From the traditions of the Sts'Ailes (Chehalis) ==
The Sts'Ailes, who live at Chehalis, British Columbia, have extensive traditions concerning the Sasquatch, whom they regard as another tribe and whom they continue to encounter into modern times. According to Sts'Ailes stories, the Sasquatch speak the Douglas language, i.e. Stʼatʼimc, the version of St'at'imcets spoken at Port Douglas, at the head of Harrison Lake.

== See also ==
- Lil'wat account of the Chinook Wind
- Annie York, Nlaka'pamux storyteller and author
