= Ute mythology =

Mythology of the Ute people

The Ute mythology is the mythology of the Ute people, a tribe of Native Americans from the Western United States. Ute mythology is a body of stories and beliefs that are expressive of the cultural heritage and values of the Ute people.

== Ute creation story ==
Due to copyright, the mythological story of the creation of the Utes may be found on their official website. The Southern Ute Indian Tribe has shared recent versions of their creation story, emphasizing the continuous existence of the Utes within the boundaries of their ancestral home. According to Alden Naranjo, a Southern Ute elder, it is maintained in the creation narrative of the Ute that they have always occupied this mountainous region, in contrast to the creation stories of migration told in many other tribes. The Utes' strong relationship with their land is reinforced further by this perspective.

== Bear Dance ==
As told by Snake John, the story of the origin of the bear dance goes as follows:

In the fall the snow comes, and the bear has a wickiup in a hole. He stays there all winter, perhaps six moons. In the spring the snow goes, and he comes out. The bear dances up to a big tree on his hind feet. He dances up and back, back and forth, and sings, "Um, um, um, um!" He makes a path up to the tree, embraces it, and goes back again, singing "Um, Um, Um!" He dances very much, all the time. Now Indians do it, and call it the "Bear Dance." It happens in the spring, and they do not dance in the winter. The bear understands the Bear Dance.

== Key Ute mythological figures ==
Anthropological linguistics studies suggest animals are significant to Ute folklore. Traditional Ute linguistics includes words for Wolf, Little Bird, Mountain Lion, Fox, Mountain Sheep, Turtle, Bear, Coyote, and Weasle.

=== Wolf ===
- "Creator and culture hero of the Ute tribe. Like other figures from the mythic age, Wolf is usually represented as a man in Ute stories, but sometimes takes on the literal form of a wolf."

=== Coyote ===
- "Wolf's younger brother, Coyote is a trickster figure. Though he often assists his brother and sometimes even does good deeds for the people, Coyote's behavior is so irresponsible and frivolous that he is constantly getting himself and those around him into trouble."

== Folk tales ==
- Pokoh, the Old Man
- Blood Clot
- Porcupine Hunts Buffalo, Hunt deer, Hunt elk, Hunt grasshoppers
- Puma and the Bear
- Two Grandsons
- Coyote & Duck
