= Folklore of Antigua and Barbuda =

Folklore of Antigua and Barbuda encompasses the myths, legends, oral traditions, music, customs, and cultural expressions that have developed in Antigua and Barbuda over centuries. Like other variants of Caribbean folklore, it is a reflection of the various African, European, and Indigenous influences on the archipelago's culture, along with newer innovations from the country itself and surrounding islands.

== Folkloric characters ==
In the Anglophone Caribbean, Anansi is an African-derived character who is known for trickery, greed, and manipulation. In local folktales, Anansi lives in an apple tree and can transform himself into a spider when confronted. Due to his close relationship with animals, he speaks with a nasal voice although is otherwise indistinguishable from a normal human. Anansi is associated with Bro' Toukouma, who is considered to be either a victim of his tricks or a son of his. Other associates of his include Bro' Lion, Bro' Dog, Bro' Rabbit, and Bro' Monkey. These characters are based on animals present in West Africa.

Another tale is that of Big Garee, the greatest bird in a forest who rules with an iron first. When he sings, all the other birds in the forest go to hide. Big Garee's dominance is challenged by Little Garee, who offers a sum of money to whoever can kill him. Unlike the other birds, Little Garee is not afraid of Big Garee's song, which enrages him. They eventually decide to fight and Little Garee ends up pushing him into boiling oil. Anansi claims credit for his death, but is disproven when he can hardly lift his corpse.

White Jack and Black Jack are said to have grew up together as brothers after their mothers– one a white migrant and one her black servant, became pregnant after drinking from magical ponds. Black Jack loved to hunt and always carried a knife. Black Jack desired a princess who was frequently attacked by a lion. It was rumoured that whoever killed the lion would get to have her as his wife. Black Jack was successful and married her although White Jack resembled his friend enough that the princess once mistook him for her husband. White Jack and the princess eventually slept together although their relationship soured after he discovered signs of Black Jack in the castle. Thinking he was dead, he demanded details of his location and they were eventually reunited, until Black Jack killed White Jack after learning of the affair.

== Folk music ==
Benna is a genre native to Antigua that before the 1950s was the most popular secular genre in the region. Songs often focused on a specific topic and spread throughout the island, and the genre was used to spread news and gossip in a call-and-response format. The genre dates back to slavery and has been described as the "newspaper of the people", being involved in spreading the news of key events in the country's history including the emancipation of slaves in 1834. Benna has since lost popularity to calypso, a Trinidadian genre that is used for a similar purpose.

== Mythology ==
Several myths are widespread in the country. These include the claims that St. John's Cathedral was built on top of a volcano, that the Bat's Cave in Saint Paul leads to Dominica, and that Christopher Columbus landed in Antigua. It is also widely (albeit falsely) believed by the population that the Ciboney were the first inhabitants of the archipelago, that the people of the pre-Columbian era knew the island as Wadadli, and that the Kalinago once practiced cannibalism.

== Locations and landmarks ==
- Boggy Peak and the rest of the Shekerley Mountains were once believed to be the home of a boogeyman who attacked escaped slaves.
- Ding-a-Dong-Nook is a ghost village named after a legend about an Antiguan governor who lost his family to a group of attacking Kalinago there.
- Some believe that Christopher Columbus visited Santa Maria Hill near Cedar Grove.
- The Kingdom of Redonda, one of the oldest extant micro nations, is rumoured to have once been an independent kingdom for a brief period in the 19th century.
