= Lencan mythology =

Indigenous beliefs in Honduras and El Salvador

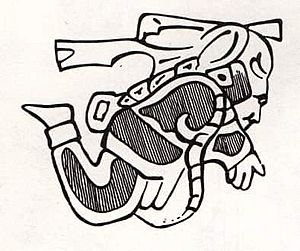
Lencan figure known as the "flying god"

Lenca mythology is the set of religious and mythological beliefs of the Lenca people of Honduras and El Salvador, before and after the conquest of America. Few of these beliefs have been documented due to colonization and the adoption of the Catholic faith after the 16th century.

According to the Lenca cosmovision, the universe is round and held up by four beams, one for each cardinal direction. The Lenca believed that milpas, mountains, rivers, wells and other places were owned by spirits that had to be appeased through rituals.

== Myths ==
=== Creation of man ===
According to the original Lenca polytheistic religion, the creation of man is thanks to a deity known as "Maraguana", she brought the dust of the stars to earth, and when she arrived there she collected the dry grains of corn and cocoa beans, and in a grinding stone and a clay pot, he molded a creature different from the others on earth created by the gods, this endowed it with consciousness and intelligence and thus made the first human being. The place called "Ti Ketau Antawinikil" Some time later this deity created another human known as "Ti wanatuku", he was born from an egg, which was hatched in a bird's nest on the head of the first human being. Both are considered the ancestors of modern humans.

=== The guardian or corn ===
According to Lenca myth, Cacalote, was a mythical bird similar to a vulture, is considered the discoverer of corn. It is said that during the harvest, it has the habit of stealing ears of corn from the sacks and storing them in caves. When corn is scarce, the bird takes the ears to feed itself and drops the kernels to feed others, including humans. This story makes it a guardian of this grain and a symbol of the cycle of abundance and scarcity. In the Lenca worldview, Cacalote is not just a simple animal, but an enigmatic figure who brought one of the most important foods for humanity and one that was essential for Mesoamerica.

=== Guardians of the mountains ===
According to oral tradition, long ago when the Lenca celestial deity was creating the sky, he created a series of intelligent celestial beings called the Egueguan (also called Sequeguan). These beings lived among the stars, but could not withstand the heat. Therefore, they decided to descend to Earth in search of a better climate and ended up taking refuge in the mountains, where they died. Their spirits remained in the mountains, where they still dwell today, acting as guardians.

=== The discovery of clouds ===
According to legend, two curious animals (an armadillo and an opossum) are credited with discovering the clouds. Certain aspects of this legend are unclear, but it is said that one day, while digging, the two creatures stumbled upon clouds trapped in clay vessels similar to jars of divine origin and completely sealed. In their curiosity they broke the vessels, without knowing they freed the clouds and claimed them for themselves. However, when the gods realized what had happened, they captured the creatures and took the clouds back to decorate the sky.

=== Comizahual ===
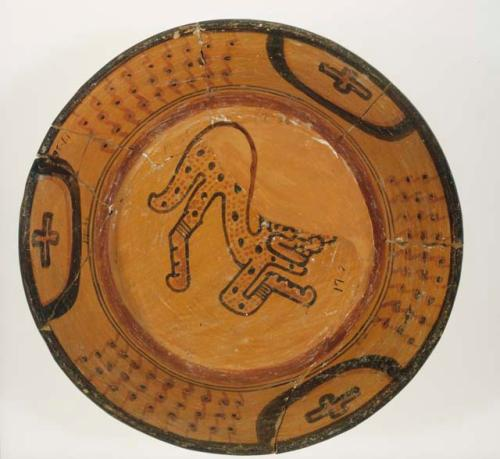
Representation of a jaguar or ocelot on a plate found in the archaeological site of Ulua-Yojoa.

The legend of the Comizahual (or Comizahuatl) speaks of a matriarch that is said to have appeared around more than two hundred years before the conquest of America, possibly at the end of the 13th century, which is represented with a zoomorphic figure similar to a jaguar and in her human form she is represented as a woman with white skin and hair, she is described as a skilled person as a warrior and wise as a leader. This woman guided and taught some new knowledge about agriculture and warfare to the Lencas that they began to implement during the following years during the post classic mesoamerican period. Fulfilled his mission, he distributed the lands among three men according to some versions these were his sons, in others his brothers, to whom he left instructions for the treatment of his vassals, after that, the matriarch disappeared.

Because of Comizahual's physical description, some have proposed that she was a European who arrived in Central America before the Spanish, but there is no evidence for this. On the other hand, most academics have said that Comizahual could be an interpretation of a person with albinism.

== Deities ==
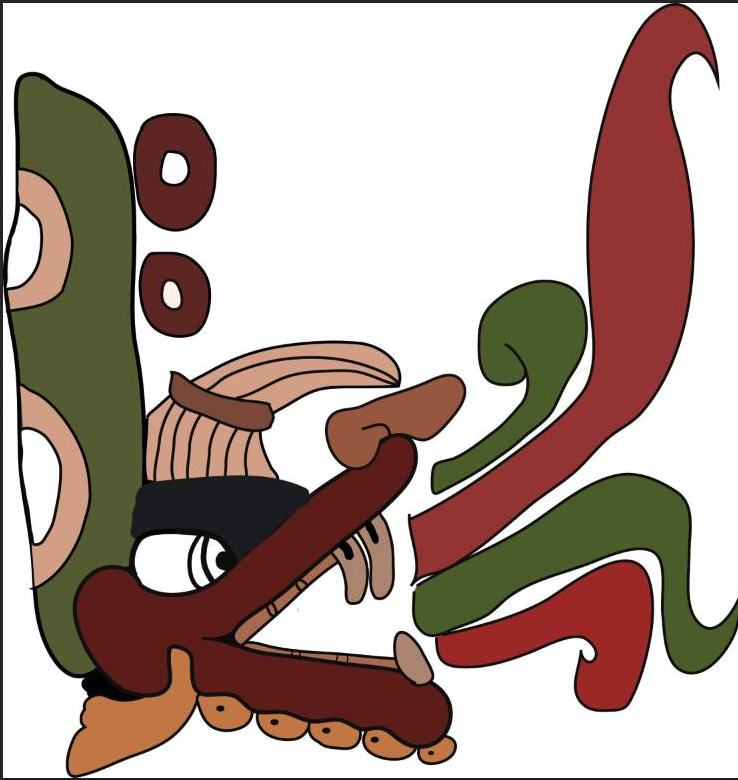
Possible representation of the deity known as Maraguana, found in a vessel from the classic period currently on display at the Banco atlantida Museum.

The Lenca religion, similar to those of the rest of the Mesoamerican area, was polytheistic and had countless deities in its pantheon. Very few detailed records of them or the indigenous Lenca faith survived due to loss of the oral tradition and the lack of documentation by chroniclers, however, thanks to studies of the Lenca deities, there is still a record.

=== Itanipuca ===
Considered the main deity of the Lenca people, Itanipuca was known as "the great father", related to the sky, the movement of the stars, and possibly also astronomy which was important in Mesoamerican cosmology. Itanipuca could have parallels with other Mesoamerican deities such as Itzamna or Tezcatlipoca.

=== Ilanguipuca ===
Ilanguipuca is a goddess of the land, its forests, rivers, lakes, and agricultural fertility of. She is known as the "Great Mother" as she is the wife of Itanipuca, and created the world together with him. This goddess can be seen as a type of mother goddess or fertility goddess.

=== Icelaca ===
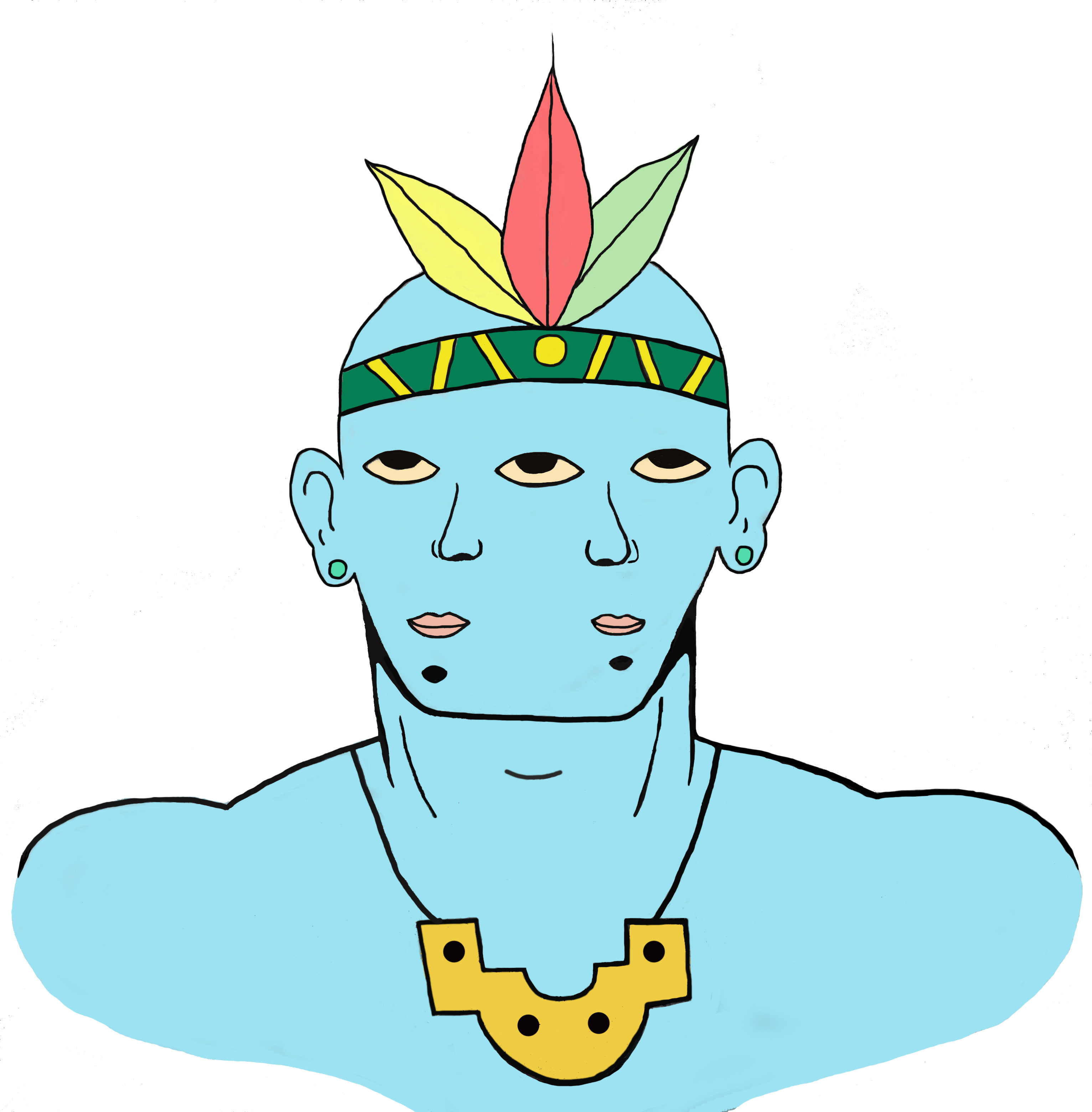
Hypothetical recreation of Icelaca according to the few descriptions that have been found, this deity has two faces because the legend says that he can see the past, present and future.

Icelaca was the god of time, the cause of the change of the seasons over time. He was also related to winds and meteorological phenomena such as hurricanes and electrical storms. This deity could have some similar elements with the Maya god Chaac or the Mexica Tláloc.

This is the most documented deity of the Lenca people. The Spanish chronicler Diego García de Palacio, in his Description of the Captaincy General of Guatemala of 1576 relates that in Sesori he observed how 4 young men about twelve years old were circumcised and their blood was placed on a representation of this deity that had a round shape with two faces full of eyes (to see the past and the future), and to which deer, chickens and rabbits were also sacrificed. The chronicler Antonio de Herrera y Tordesillas adds that dogs that do not bark and turkeys were also sacrificed to him, and blood, tongues and ears were offered in self-sacrifice, and that the representation of the deity was a large three-pointed stone with a deformed face in each one.

Likewise, Anne Chapman in her book The Children of Copal and the Candela of 1992, mentions that some indigenous people from the village of Manazapa (Honduran department of Intibucá) told her that they had a two-faced deity who saw the past, present and future, to which they performed repairs (domestic and agrarian rites), and they cut people's throats and watered the representation of the deity with their blood while they played drums (decorated with quetzal feathers) and snails.

According to the Salvadoran writer María de Baratta in her work Cuzcatlán Tífico of 1951, based on what Aquilino Argueta collected from the indigenous elders of Torola, under the deity of rain (who sometimes manifested as a snake) there were spirits or geniuses who personified the hills, who were asked for a good rain, and to whom a priest (whose title was misilán) sacrificed turkeys, and then collected the blood of the animal in a glass or jug and then poured it over a lagoon that there was before in Torola.

=== Managuara ===
Very little is known about this deity because of a lack of sources. Managuara was representative of knowledge and was responsible for the creation of man and endowing him with consciousness. It could have parallels with the Maya Kukulkan or Mexica Quetzalcoatl.

== Religious practices ==
Being part of the Mesoamerican world, the Lenca people adopted many customs similar to those associated with nagualism. According to this belief, people were protected by and could transform into certain animals such as coyotes, serpents or dogs. When the animal died, so too did the person it was linked to.

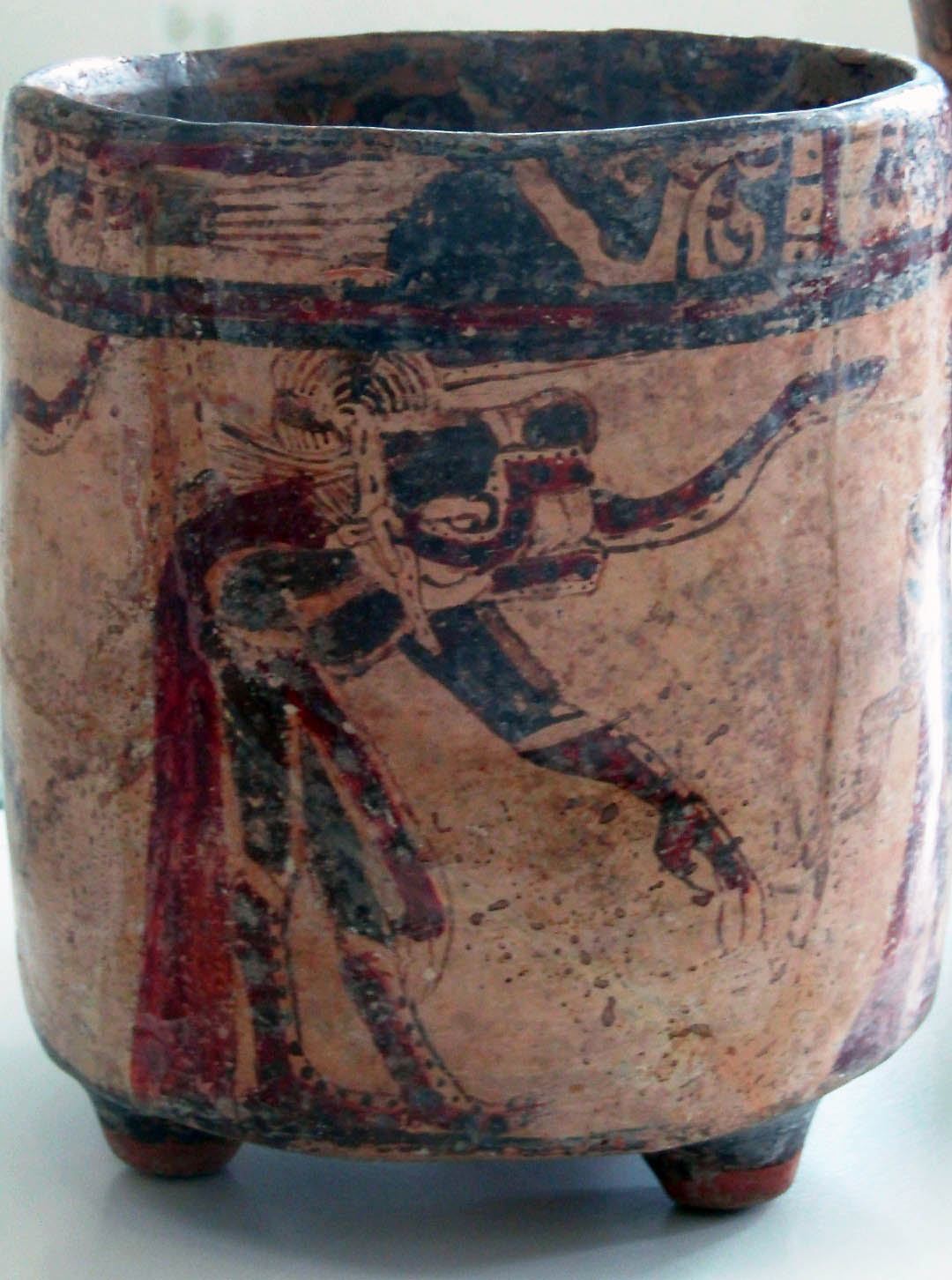
Vessel found at the Tenampúa site, this could depict a priest using anthropomorphic clothing elements while performing a ritual.

It is said that the Lenca practiced certain rituals closely related to animal sacrifices, although to date there is no strong evidence of mass or systematic human sacrifices at known Lenca sites. What is known is that many sacrifices were performed only at specific times to ask favors of the gods, such as improved harvests, favorable weather, to express gratitude, or to celebrate a military victory.

Regarding daily religious practices, it is known that women played an important role in shamanism. It is believed that all women of this ethnic group practiced it to a greater or lesser extent before the arrival of the Spanish. Because of this, it is possible that the priestly caste was partly composed of women, suggesting that they held a more important role in Lenca society before the conquest.

It is known that rituals existed to give thanks to the goddess Ilangipuca, to bless corn, to bless the construction of a new building, and so on. There may also have been rituals dedicated to other supernatural beings who could bring rain, winds, and fertility to the land, to remove other evil spirits. These beings hold the position of guardians of forests and rivers within Lenca cosmology, and they should be thanked for their work.

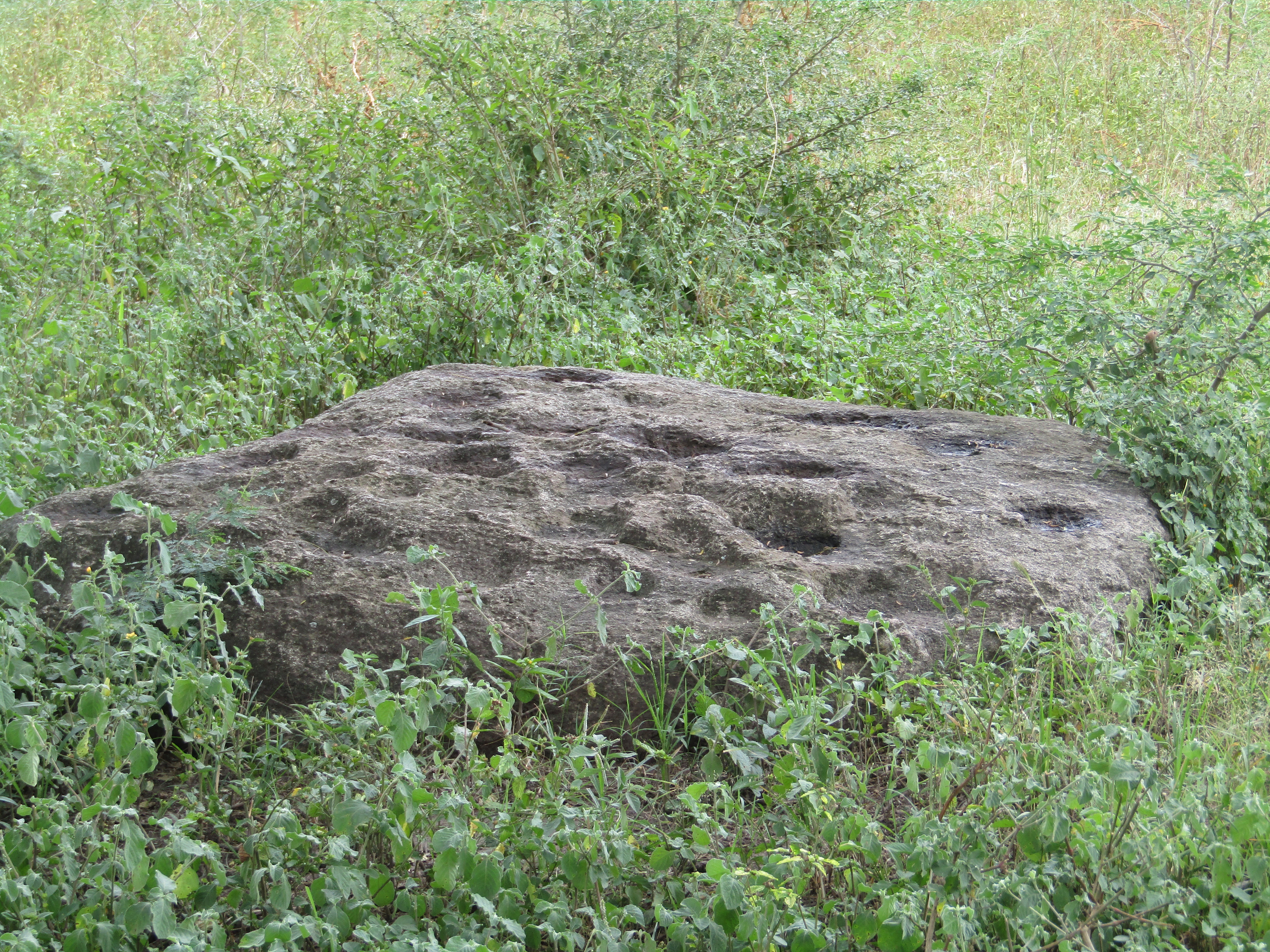
The so-called "sacrificial stone" in Yarumela was used to grind fruits in preparation for religious activities.

Although there are not many surviving records, it is very likely that the Lenca people performed religious ceremonies associated with the sun, the horizon, and the changing of the seasons. Archaeological studies at sites like Yarumela show that pyramids 101 and 102 align with the sun, casting an arrow-shaped shadow that marks the beginning of the corn planting season starting in June, which would be the summer solstice.

One of the pre-Hispanic rituals that still survives is the compostura (offering rite), which consists of giving thanks to the earth by offering copal, candles, seeds, or the blood of a sacrificed fowl. To this day, this ceremony retains many pre-Columbian elements, such as the use of fire, cocoa beans, and smoke, the veneration of water and corn, and the role of the prayer leader or spiritual guide, emulating the role of shamans like those that existed in the ancient priestly caste in pre-Columbian times.

Despite this, the ritual exhibits a degree of syncretism with Catholicism, since during the ceremonies some Lenca people include diverse images of Christian saints and mention figures from the Christian religion.

== See also ==
- History of Honduras
- History of El Salvador
- Mesoamerican Religion
