= Yokuts traditional narratives =

Yokuts traditional narratives include myths, legends, tales, and oral histories preserved by the Yokuts people of the San Joaquin Valley and southern Sierra Nevada foothills of central California.

Yokuts narratives constitute one of the most abundantly documented oral literatures in the state. They clearly belong to the central California tradition.

== See also ==
- Traditional narratives (Native California)

== Online examples of Yokuts narratives ==
- "The California Indians" by Stephen Powers (1873)
- "Indian Myths of South Central California" by Alfred L. Kroeber (1907)
- Myths and Legends of California and the Old Southwest by Katharine Berry Judson (1912)
- The North American Indian by Edward S. Curtis (1924)

== Sources for Yokuts narratives ==
- Berman, Howard. 1980. "Two Chukchansi Coyote Stories (Yokuts)". In Coyote Stories II, edited by Martha B. Kendall, pp. 56–70. International Journal of American Linguistics Native American Texts Series No. 6. University of Chicago Press.
- Cummins, Marjorie W. 1979. The Tache-Yokuts, Indians of the San Joaquin Valley: Their Lives, Songs and Stories. 2nd ed. Pioneer Publishers, Fresno, California.
- Cummins, Marjorie W. 1992. How Coyote Stole the Sun: The Myth, the Music, and Other Features of the Yokuts Culture. M. W. Cummins, Hanford, California.
- Curtis, Edward S. 1907–1930. The North American Indian. 20 vols. Plimpton Press, Norwood, Massachusetts. (Four myths, including Earth Diver and Theft of Fire, collected from Bill Wilcox (Gashowu) and Dick Neal (Chukchhansi), vol. 14, pp. 177–179.)
- Gamble, Geoffrey. 1980. "How People Got Their Hands (Wikchamni)". In Coyote Stories II, edited by Martha B. Kendall, pp. 53–55. International Journal of American Linguistics Native American Texts Series No. 6. University of Chicago Press.
- Gamble, Geoffrey. 1993. Yokuts Texts. Native American Text Series No. 1. Mouton De Gruyter, Berlin.
- Gayton, Anna H. 1930a. "Yokuts-Mono Chiefs and Shamans". University of California Publications in American Archaeology and Ethnology 24:361-420. Berkeley. (Portrayals of chiefs in myths, pp. 369–371.)
- Gayton, Anna H. 1930b. "The Ghost Dance of 1870 in South-Central California". University of California Publications in American Archaeology and Ethnology 28:57-82. Berkeley. (Yokuts/Mono version of the Orpheus legend, p. 77.)
- Gayton, Anna H., and Stanley S. Newman. 1940. "Yokuts and Western Mono Myths". Anthropological Records 5:1-110. University of California, Berkeley. (Variants of myths, including Earth Diver, Theft of Fire, and Orpheus, from many Yokuts and Monache groups collected in 1925–1931, with comparative notes.)
- Gifford, Edward Winslow, and Gwendoline Harris Block. 1930. California Indian Nights. Arthur H. Clark, Glendale, California. (Four previously published narratives, pp. 126, 185–187, 225–226, 258–259.)
- Hudson, J. W. 1902. "An Indian Myth of the San Joaquin Basin". Journal of American Folklore 15:104-106. (Yokuts version of the Orpheus legend.)
- Judson, Katharine Berry. 1912. Myths and Legends of California and the Old Southwest. A. C. McClurg, Chicago. (One myth, pp. 95–96.)
- Kroeber, A. L. 1907a. "The Yokuts Language of South Central California". University of California Publications in American Archaeology and Ethnology 2:165-377. Berkeley. (Yaudanchi narratives, including Orpheus, pp. 255–277.)
- Kroeber, A. L. 1907b. "Indian Myths of South Central California". University of California Publications in American Archaeology and Ethnology 4:167-250. Berkeley. (Myths, including Earth Diver, Theft of Fire, and Orpheus, from several different Yokuts groups, pp. 204–242.)
- Kroeber, A. L. 1925. Handbook of the Indians of California. Bureau of American Ethnology Bulletin No. 78. Washington, D.C. (Notes and comparisons, pp. 495, 497, 510.)
- Kroeber, Theodora 1959. The Inland Whale. University of California Press. (Retelling of traditional narratives, including Orpheus, with commentary, pp. 141–149, 197–201.)
- Latta, Frank F. 1936. California Indian Folklore. F. F. Latta, Shafter, California. (24 myths, including Earth Diver and Theft of Fire, from different Yokuts groups, recorded in the 1920s and 1930s.)
- Luthin, Herbert W. 2002. Surviving through the Days: A California Indian Reader. University of California Press, Berkeley. (A Chowchilla version of the Orpheus myth from Gamble 1994 and a Yawelamni myth "Condor Steals Falcon's Wife" from Gayton and Newman 1944, pp. 347–362.)
- Margolin, Malcolm. 1993. The Way We Lived: California Indian Stories, Songs, and Reminiscences. First edition 1981. Heyday Books, Berkeley, California. (One narrative, p. 94-95, from Kroeber 1907.)
- Powers, Stephen. 1877. Tribes of California. Contributions to North American Ethnology, vol. 3. Government Printing Office, Washington, D.C. Reprinted with an introduction by Robert F. Heizer in 1976, University of California Press, Berkeley. (Earth Diver myth, pp. 383–384.)
- Rogers, Barbara Thrall, and Anna H. Gayton. 1944. "Twenty-Seven Chukchansi Yokuts Myths". Journal of American Folklore 57:190-207. (Versions, including Earth Diver and Theft of Fire, collected in 1938.)
- Stewart, George W. 1906. "A Yokuts Creation Myth". Journal of American Folklore 19:322. (Brief Wikchamni narrative collected in 1903 from Jim Herrington.)
- Stewart, George W. 1908. "Two Yokuts Traditions". Journal of American Folklore 21:237-239. (Tachi accounts, including Theft of Fire, collected from Tom Atwell in 1907.)
- Thompson, Stith. 1929. Tales of the North American Indians. Harvard University Press, Cambridge, Massachusetts. (Lizard Hand myth, p. 38, from Kroeber 1907.)
