= List of Native American deities =

List of Native American deities, sortable by name of tribe or name of deity.

== North American deities ==
Tribe or group	Deity or spirit or man	Notes
Abenaki	Azeban	Trickster
Abenaki	Gluskab	Kind protector of humanity
Abenaki	Malsumis	Cruel, evil god
Abenaki	Pamola	Bird spirit; causes cold weather
Abenaki	Tabaldak	The creator
Blackfoot	Apistotookii	Creator
Blackfoot	Napi	Trickster
Cahuilla	Tahquitz	Creator, death, or evil.
Haida	Ta'xet	God of violent death
Haida	Tia	Goddess of peaceful death
Ho-Chunk	Red Horn	'He Who Wears (Human) Faces on His Ears'
Hopi	Aholi	A kachina
Hopi	Angwusnasomtaka	Crow Mother, a kachina
Hopi	Kokopelli	Fertility, flute player, a kachina
Hopi	Kokyangwuti	Creation, Spider grandmother
Hopi	Muyingwa	Germination of seeds, a kachina
Hopi	Taiowa	Sun spirit, creator
Innu	Kanipinikassikueu	Provider of caribou
Innu	Matshishkapeu	Spirit of the anus
Inuit	Igaluk	Lunar deity
Inuit	Nanook	Master of bears
Inuit	Nerrivik	Sea mother and food provider
Inuit	Pinga	Goddess of the hunt, fertility, and medicine
Inuit	Sedna	Sea goddess, ruler of the underworld
Inuit	Torngasoak	Sky god
Iroquois	Adekagagwaa	Summer
Iroquois	Gaoh	Wind god
Iroquois	Gendenwitha	Maiden, transformed into Morning Star by Dawn.
Iroquois	Gohone	Winter
Iroquois	Hahgwehdaetgan	God of evil. Twin of Hahgwehdiyu.
Iroquois	Hahgwehdiyu	Creator; god of goodness and light. Twin of Hahgwehdaetgan.
Iroquois	Onatha	Fertility
Klamath	Llao	God of the underworld
Klamath	Skell	Spirit of the sky/above-world
Kwakiutl	Kewkwaxa'we	Raven spirit
Lakota	Whope	Peace
Lakota	Wi	Solar spirit, father of Whope
Lakota	Etu	Personification of time
Mi'kmaq	Niskam	The sun; architect
Miwok	Coyote	Trickster
Modoc	Kumookumts	Creator; god of goodness and light
Narragansett	Cautantowwit	Creator
Narragansett	Wompanànd	The Eastern God
Narragansett	Chekesuwànd	The Western God
Narragansett	Wunnanaméanit	The Northern God
Narragansett	Sowwanànd	The Southern God
Narragansett	Wetuomanit	The House God
Narragansett	Squauanit	God of Women
Narragansett	Muckquachuckquand	God of Children
Narragansett	Keesuckquànd	The Sun God
Narragansett	Nanepaûshat	The Moon God
Narragansett	Paumpagussit	The Sea
Narragansett	Yotáanit	The Fire God
Navajo	Asdzą́ą́ Nádleehé	Creation deity, changing woman
Navajo	Bikʼeh Hózhǫ́	Personification of speech
Navajo	Haashchʼéé Oołtʼohí	Deity of the hunt
Navajo	Haashchʼééłtiʼí	The Talking god, god of the dawn and the east
Navajo	Hashchʼéoghan	The House-god, god of evening and the west
Navajo	Niltsi	Wind god
Navajo	Tó Neinilii	'Water sprinkler', rain god
Navajo	Jóhonaaʼéí	Sun
Navajo	Yoołgai Asdzą́ą́	'White-shell woman', lunar deity
Navajo	Mą’ii	Coyote trickster god
Navajo	Black God	Creator of the stars, god of fire
Navajo		See also Diné Bahaneʼ
Pawnee	Pah	Lunar deity
Pawnee	Shakuru	Solar deity
Pawnee	Tirawa	Creator
Salish	Amotken	Supreme deity
Seneca	Eagentci	Sky goddess
Seneca	Hagones	Trickster
Seneca	Hawenniyo	A fertility god
Seneca	Kaakvha	Solar deity
Sioux	Haokah	Sacred clown
Sioux	Anpao	Spirit with two faces that represents the dawn
Snohomish	Dohkwibuhch	Creator
Taíno	Yaya (Hayah)	Supreme God/Great Spirit
Taíno	Yaya'al/Yayael (YasHayah)	The son of Yaya (Hayah)
Taíno	Atabey (goddess)	Mother goddess of fresh water and fertility. Female counterpart of the god Yúcahu
Taíno	Yúcahu	The masculine spirit of fertility in Taíno mythology along with his mother Atabey who was his feminine counterpart
Taíno	Guabancex	The top Storm Goddess; the Lady of the Winds who also deals out earthquakes and other such disasters of nature.
Taíno	Juracán	The zemi or deity of chaos and disorder believed to control the weather, particularly hurricanes.
Taíno	Guatauva	The god of thunder and lightning who is also responsible for rallying the other storm gods.
Taíno	Coatrisquie	The torrential downpour Goddess, the terrible Taíno storm servant of Guabancex and side-kick of thunder God Guatauva.
Taíno	Bayamanaco	Old man fire; the Taíno spirit of Cohoba and guardian of the secrets of sweet potato bread.
Taíno	Boinayel	God of the sun and of good weather; Marohu's twin brother.
Taíno	Márohu	God of the moon and of rain, rainstorms, and floods; Boinayel's twin brother.
Taíno	Maketaori Guayaba	The god of Coaybay or Coabey, the land of the dead.
Taíno	Opiyel Guabiron	A dog-shaped god that watched over the dead; often associated with the Greek Cerberus.
Tongva	Chinigchinix	Mythological figure of the Mission Indians
Wyandot	Airesekui	Creation
Wyandot	Heng	Storm god
Wyandot	Iosheka	Creation

== South American deities ==
Tribe or group	Deity or spirit	Notes
Inca	Apu	Tutelary mountain spirits All of the important mountains have their own Apu, and some of them receive sacrifices to bring out certain aspects of their being. Some rocks and caves also are credited as having their own apu.
Inca	Ataguchu	God who assisted in creation myth.
Inca	Catequil	God of thunder and lightning.
Inca	Cavillace	Virginity goddess. Ate a fruit, which was actually the sperm of Coniraya, the moon god. And gave birth to a son.
Inca	Cavillace's son	Son of Cavillace and Coniraya. When he was born, Cavillace demanded that the father step forward. No one did, so she put the baby on the ground and it crawled towards Coniraya. She was ashamed because of Coniraya's low stature among the gods, and ran to the coast of Peru, where she changed herself and her son into rocks.
Inca	Ch'aska/ Ch'aska Quyllur	Goddess of dawn and twilight.
Inca	Coniraya	Moon god. Fashioned his sperm into a fruit, which Cavillaca then ate, and gave birth to a child.
Inca	Pachamama	Fertility Goddess. Wife of Vircocha.
Inca	Viracocha	Creation God. Husband of Pachamama.
Inca	Mama Killa	Moon Goddess. Daughter of Vircocha and Pachamama. Wife of Inti.
Inca	Inti	Sun God. Son of Vircocha and Pachamama. Husband of Mama Killa.
Inca	Manco Cápac	Son of either Viracocha or Inti. First Emperor of Cuzco of the Inca Empire.
Inca	Mama Ocllo	Wife of Manco Cápac. First Empress of Cuzco of the Inca Empire.
Inca	Ayar Cachi	Brother of Manco Cápac.

== See also ==
- Mythologies of the indigenous peoples of the Americas
