= Ahöl Mana =

Maiden spirit in Hoping religion

In Hopi mythology, Ahöl Mana is a Kachina Mana, a female spirit, also called a kachina. She is represented as a standard Kachin Mana; it is because she arrives with Ahöla that she is called Ahöl Mana. During the Powamu ceremony, she goes with Ahöla as he visits various kivas and ceremonial houses. On these visits Ahöl Mana carries a tray with various kinds of seeds.

== Sources ==
- "Kachinas : A Hopi Artist's Documentary." Barton Wright. Seventh Edition. Northland Publishing Company with the Heard Museum. Flagstaff, AZ: 1974.
