= Tumas (disambiguation) =

Tumas is a given name and a surname

Tumas may also refer to

- Tümas, or Angwusnasomtaka, a spirit in Hopi mythology
- Tumas, original name of Dağ Tumas, village in Azerbaijan
