= Aholi =

Spirit in Hopi mythology

In Hopi mythology, Aholi is a kachina, a spirit. He is a friend of Eototo and is very handsome; he wears a colorful cloak with a picture of Muyingwa and is the patron kachina of the Pikya clan. Aholi once allowed his throat to be slit so that Eototo could escape. They eventually met again. Aholi, a chief kachina on Third Mesa, appears with Eototo. Both are principal kachinas appearing in the Powamu and other sacred rituals.
