= Nataska =

Figure in Hopi mythology

In Hopi mythology Nataska (also Nata´aska and variants) is the uncle of the family of "ogre Katsinas" who guard Soyok Wuhti (Monster Woman), and who enforce good behavior among the children. Nataska is a Mongkatsina (a chief among the Katsinam). Wiharu (White Nataska) is a similar or identical Katsina with a white rather than black face.

As with other Hopi Katsinam, Nataskas exist in three senses: as spiritual beings, as dancers / characters in the yearly rituals (who are understood as metaphors for and to some extent manifestations of the beings), and as carved wooden figures depicting the beings. They serve a cultural role of explaining the Hopi way of life, particularly for indoctrinating children in the society's history, behavioral expectations, moral codes, and ritual practices. They are also part of the ceremony for inducting young children into the Kachina Society.

In both the mask and figure form, Nataska has a large, long snout, and carries a saw or knife in one hand, and a hunting bow in the other. The mask is sometimes hinged to make a clacking sound as the Katsina dancer moves, which is frightening to children. Depending on the village, there may be several Nataskas. They are said to inhabit a series of long caves near Pinon, Arizona.

Nataska appears during the midwinter bean planting ceremony, early in the ceremonial season. On First Mesa and Second Mesa villages (but not on Third Mesa since 1910) men of the village, dressed as Nataska and other ogres, visit the homes of families with children, demanding gifts of food with a warning that if the gift is unsatisfactory when they return, or if the children have misbehaved, they will return to kidnap or eat the children. Often, the families have mentioned their children's misbehavior in advance of the visits, so that the children are frightened into thinking the ogres have special powers of observation. The ogres appear again at the Powamuya (bean dance) accompanying Soyok Wuhti to threaten children against misbehaving. In some versions of the ceremony, they are vanquished or appeased by the end of the dance so as to spare the children's lives, and return to their caves until next season.

== Similar Kachinas ==
Atoshli is an ogre kachina at Zuni Pueblo. Cochiti has "River Men" from the Rio Grande who threaten to carry off naughty children in sacks. The Arizona Tewa also have mythology about cannibalistic ogres who eat children.
