= Ahöla =

Spirit being in Hopi religion

Ahöla, also known as Ahul, is a spirit being, a kachina, embodied by a man, in Hopi religion.

Ahöla is one of the important chief katsinam for First and Second Mesas because he opens the mid-winter Powamu ceremony, sometimes called the bean planting festival. On the first night of the festival, he performs inside a kiva, the subterranean, ceremonial space, before going with the Powamu Chief to give prayer feathers to Kachina Spring at dawn. Afterwards, Ahöla and the Powamu Chief visit all of the kivas and ceremonial houses, giving out bean and corn plants and marking the doorways with stripes of cornmeal. At the end of the ceremony, Ahöla descends to a shrine, bows four times to the sun, and asks for health, happiness, long life, and good crops. Ahöla is also the friend of Eototo and one legend tells of Ahöla having his throat cut to let Eototo escape.

== Sources ==
- Mesa Verde National Park
- Wright, Barton. Kachinas: A Hopi Artist's Documentary. Seventh Edition. Flagstaff, AZ: Northland Publishing Company with the Heard Museum: 1974.
