= Blue Star Kachina =

Supposed Hopi prophecy

In Frank Waters's writings on Hopi mythology, the Blue Star Kachina or Saquasohuh, is a kachina or spirit, that will signify the coming of the beginning of the new world by appearing in the form of a blue star. The Blue Star Kachina is said to be the ninth and final sign before the "Day of Purification", described as an apocalypse or a "world engulfing cataclysm" that will lead to the destruction of the world. Author Jason Colavito investigated this prophecy and found no reference to it before the late twentieth century.

== Overview ==
According to Hopi legend as reported by writer Frank Waters, at the beginning of time, Taiowa the Creator created his nephew, Sótuknang, to construct places for life. Out of the nothingness, Sótuknang created nine universes or worlds: one for Taiowa, one for himself, and seven others for additional life. The first three of these worlds, Tokpela, Tokpa and Kuskurza, have already been inhabited and subsequently destroyed due to the corruption and wickedness of man. Each time one of the worlds is destroyed, the faithful Hopi are taken underground and saved from destruction to later emerge and populate the next world. According to Waters' books, which were written in the 1960s, Hopis believe that humanity is currently residing in the fourth world, Túwaqachi. Like the previous worlds, Túwaqachi is also prophesied to be destroyed because of the corruption of humanity.

=== The final sign ===
The ninth and final sign of destruction is described by White Feather (via Waters) as, "You will hear of a dwelling-place in the heavens, above the earth, that shall fall with a great crash. It will appear as a blue star. Very soon after this, the ceremonies of my people will cease". This idea of the Blue Star Kachina marking the end of all Hopi rituals is reflected in Waters' book, Book of the Hopi, in which he states, "The end of all Hopi ceremonialism will come when a kachina removes his mask during a dance in the plaza before uninitiated children." This absence of Hopi ceremonialism will coincide with the destruction of the fourth world. Waters suggested that World War III will begin and the United States will be ripped apart by war, leaving only the Hopis and their homeland intact. The war of the end of the world is described by Waters as "a spiritual conflict with material matters".

According to Hopi prophecy (as reported by Waters), shortly after the Blue Star Kachina is visible to all and the Day of Purification is realized, the True White Brother will come to earth in search of Hopi "who steadfastly adhere to their ancient teachings". It is said that if the True White Brother fails in his mission and is unable to find uncorrupted men and women, that the earth will be completely destroyed and none will be spared. However, if successful in bringing the symbols and finding those who still follow the true Hopi way of life, the world will be created anew and all the faithful will be saved from destruction.

== Criticism ==
Author Jason Colavito was not able to find any reference to the name "Blue Star Kachina" before Frank Water's "Book of the Hopi" in 1963. He concludes that it is probably a late twentieth century invention.

In Colavito's article, he found that the earliest mention of the nine signs that are now associated with the "Blue Kachina" is to a Methodist pastor David Young who picked up a Hopi hitchhiker White Feather in 1958, and then wrote a pamphlet based on his memories of what they said. Colavito wrote:

"The strong Christian apocalyptic themes in the prophecy make plain that Young was likely far more than the mere transmitter of the prophecies"

Although there was evidence these were circulated in pamphlets in 1959, the earliest printed mention Colavito found of them is in 1980 in "Rolling Thunder: The Coming Earth Changes" by Joey R. Jochmans.

The prophecies entered the "alternative mainstream" in 1987 in a new age event, the "Harmonic Convergence" when many gathered at Prophecy Rock at the Hopi mesas. But there were no Hopi participants and it was decried by Hopi elders.

There is evidence gathered by Armin Geertz that the Hopi "continuously recreate their prophecies to justify current conditions" (Colavito's words) and that all the prophecies were composed after the events they prophecy.
