= Longhair (disambiguation) =

Longhair, or long hair, is a hairstyle, or a person with such a hairstyle. It may also refer to:

== People ==
- Leung Kwok-hung, also known as "Long Hair", a Hong Kong politician
- Professor Longhair, New Orleans musician
- "Long hair", a nickname of a faction in the Taiping Rebellion

== Cats ==
- Longhair or Persian Longhair, alternative names of the Persian cat breed
- Domestic long-haired cat, a cat of mixed ancestry
- British Longhair, a breed of cat
- American Longhair, a breed of cat

== Other ==
- Angak, a Hopi spirit also known as "Long Hair"
- "Longhair", a 1959 episode of the western TV series Yancy Derringer
