= Kachina (disambiguation) =

Kachina is a spirit being in the religious beliefs of the Pueblo peoples.

Kachina may also refer to:

- Kachina, the primary logo used by the Phoenix Coyotes/Arizona Coyotes from 1996-2003 and 2021-2024
- Kachina, a character in the 2020 video game Genshin Impact
