= Patung =

Type of a kachina

In Zuni and Hopi mythology Patung (known as the "Squash Kachina) is a kachina fetish that relates to healing and agriculture. The Hopi belief is that Patung showed the Puebloan peoples how to plant corn, then vanished.

At Hopi Patung is a Mongkatsina (a chief among the Katsinam). The Pumpkin Clan is devoted to Patung, although there are few members left of the clan and as a result their stories are not well known. Although Patung's function as a wuya is unknown and may be lost, he is still seen in use as a fetish for protection or healing Mesa. Patung is considered a shape shifter, able to become a Badger. Patung is always seen heading south in a protective and healing fetish set or Mesa. Characteristics associated with Patung include tenaciousness, passion, control, persistence and earthiness. He is most often associated with the color red and is believed to have knowledge of healing roots and herbs. Patung appears in the fall months, hiding among the harvest, usually in the shade on the southern side of a rock or tree. The katchina doll on Hopi is often made of dried gourds, pumpkins, or most commonly dried squash.
