= Angak =

In Hopi mythology, Angak or Angak'china is a male Hopi kachina spirit, represented by spirit dancers and a corresponding kachina doll figure, known to outsiders as Longhair or Long Hair. Angak is originally from the Zuni Pueblo. The goal of the Angak spirit is to bring rain and flowers to the Hopi villages. Angak sings sweet songs to bring rain. Further, he represents a healing and protective figure. There are many varieties of Angak, such as the red-bearded Hokyan Angak'china. He is present and relatively popular throughout the Hopi and Hopi-Tewa areas of Arizona and New Mexico.

== Dance ==
The dance of this figure is slow.

Angak dancers arrive in the villages grouped with White or Yellow Corn Maidens and sing positive melodies. Angak spirit dancers are often present at the home dance, Niman.

== Representation ==
Figures of Angak will have waist-length black hair, a traditional male Hopi hairstyle, and a black beard to mid chest. The figure traditionally wears a full length white cape, showing only his right hand, which contains an evergreen bough, representative of his home in the sacred San Francisco Peaks. Feathers, such as eagle fluffs, are present in his beard, and on his back or in the cape. The forward part of the headdress over the brow consists of yellow feathers, while the rear part contains a long pendant of feathers terminating in a raincloud symbol. Feathers in the doll are traditionally carved. When represented as a traditional cottonwood root carving, Angak will usually be taller than other kachinas by the same artist.

=== Rain Symbology ===
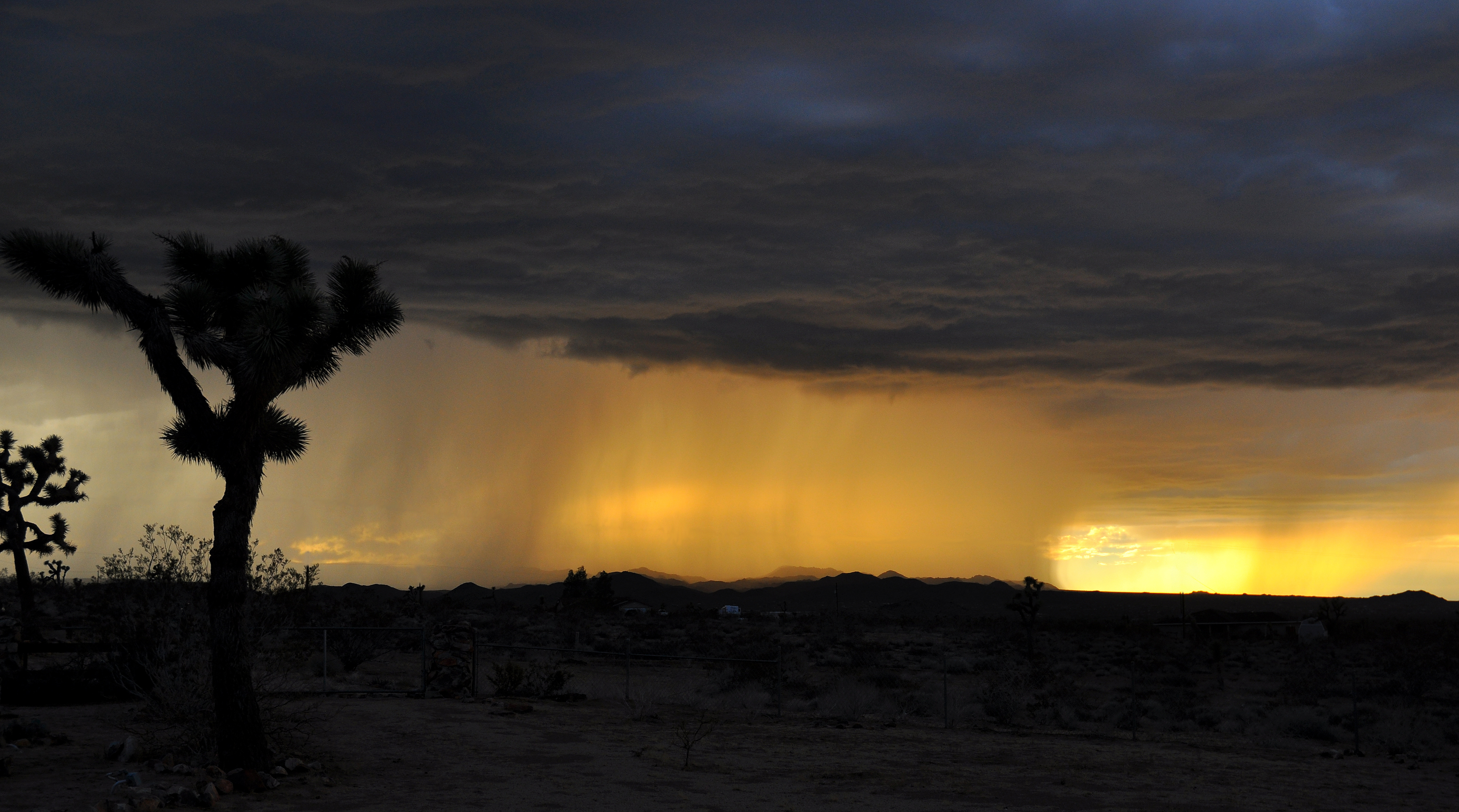
Typical desert rain that looks stranded from this view, like "the ancestor kachinas letting down their long hair"

The loose, waist length black hair and long beard represents the rain he symbolizes as bringing to the Hopi. The loose tassels of feathers represents the clouds that the rain comes from, while eagle fluffs in particular are representative of cloud bursts. Feathers on dolls' backs are Hopi prayers for rain, as are the dances by spirit dancers. Dances by Angak kachinas are said to bring rain, particularly gentle rainfalls, to help crop growth in the relatively arid areas of the Hopi homelands in the desert southwest.

When rain does come, Hopi oral legend says it is the ancestor kachinas letting down their long hair across the mesas to provide life-giving rain to take care of the living. This legend may have arisen as the approaching rain typical of the region looks like strands of hair.
