= Kököle =

Kököle (also called Kökö and Kököle-ish) are 'spirit dolls' of the Zuni Indians.

Some live up in the mountains where they search for food, however most live in the "Great Village" at the bottom of the mythical Lake of the Dead. The Lake of the Dead exists on another plane of existence beneath Spring Lake at the junction of the Zuni River and the Little Colorado River. Offerings of food are thrown into the rivers just upstream of this junction so that the whirlpools can carry them down to the spirits of the dead. Down below in the "Great Village," the Kökö live happy lives and dress always in beautifully ceremonial garb, visiting the living only occasionally to bring good luck and rewards for their devotion.

For those Kököle who live in the mountains, however, they perpetually starve because no one can wash offerings down to their plane. These Kököle in the mountains and the woods are often angry and bring nothing but sorrow to those who encounter them.

In the original Zuni Indian myths, the Kököle were the spirits of children who were drowned after the emergence of people from the underworld as told in the Zuni Creation Story. These children remain in the "Great Village" always; however, the rest of the Kököle in the mountains are people who have died, come back to life, and then returned to the underworld. For them there is no rest and no food.

Kököle also include the spirits of the recently dead. The Kököle of the recently dead frequently leave the "Great Village" to make rain, bring good crops and even bless children with strong lungs. Of the recently dead, those who return upon the death of their loved ones will take them back to the "Great Village". Husbands will in this way join their wives and wives their husbands, but children who return to visit their loved ones will be cast out of the Lake of the Dead, to become Uwanammi or water monsters. These children become angry and instead of gentle rain they bring violent storms in their discontent tantrums, attempting to rain their way back into the Zuni river and hence back to the "Great Village".

Kököle dolls are not made as idols or fetishes, but rather as teaching tools for children and as fertility charms for older brides.

== Sources ==
- Fewkes, Jesse Walter, Hopi Kachinas, 1903
- Guiley, Rosemary Ellen, The Encyclopedia of Ghosts and Spirits, 1992
- Native Religions of North America, Harper & Row, 1987
