= Soyal =

Winter festival in the Hopi culture

Soyal is the winter solstice ceremony of the Zuni and Hopi peoples held December 21, the shortest day of the year. Participants ceremonially bring the sun back from its long slumber, mark the beginning of another cycle of the Wheel of the Year, and work on purification. Pahos prayer sticks are made prior to the Soyal ceremony, to bless all the community, including homes, animals, and plants. The sacred underground kiva chambers are ritually opened to mark the beginning of the Kachina season.

== Sources ==
- Bahti, Tom. "Southwestern Indian Ceremonials", KC Publications, 1970, p36-40.
