= Toho (kachina) =

In the religious beliefs of the Native American Pueblo people, Toho is a hunter kachina for the Hopi and Zuni tribes. Toho, The mountain lion kachina, often accompanies such animals as the deer or antelope kachinas when they appear in the Line Dances of spring. Armed with yucca whips, he patrols the procession in company with He-e-e, Warrior Woman, and other warrior or guard kachinas. Thought to be the most powerful hunter, the Toho is the guardian of the northern direction. He is associated with the color yellow and appears in both hunting and healing fetish sets, always facing north. Toho can be represented by a naked man wearing a mask, whiskers, and yellow feathers upon either side of his head to look like the lion's ears, or carved as a mountain lion fetish in an ancient, primitive style. Most mountain lion fetishes are represented with their tails up and over the back. Toho is there to remind individuals to persevere, clarify goals, and move forward to achieving dreams. He steadies the hunter and protects his territory.
