= Hopi Kachina figure =

Hopi wooden carvings

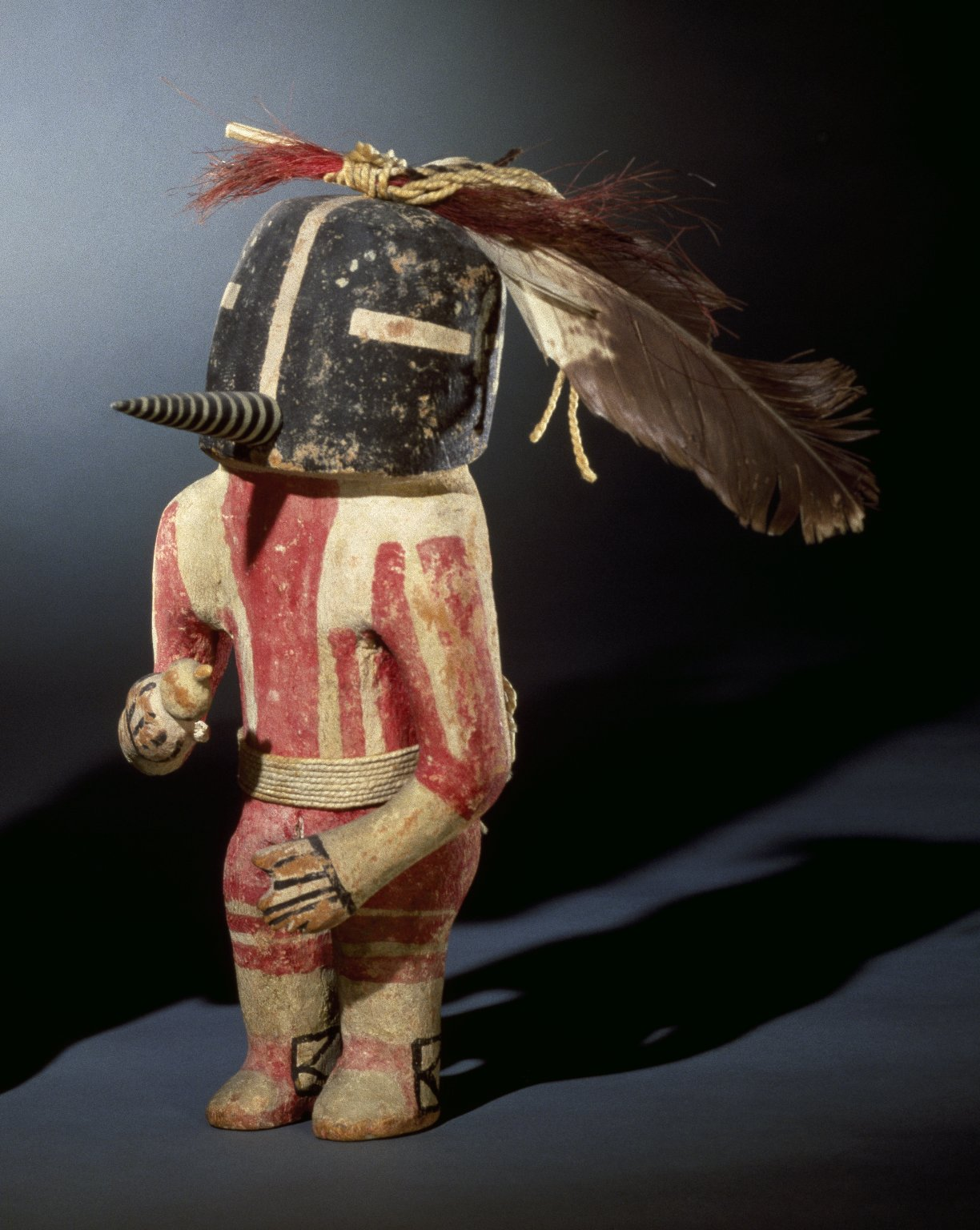
Kachina tihu (Kokopol), probably late 19th century, Brooklyn Museum

Hopi kachina figures or Hopi kachina dolls (also spelled katsina (plural: katsinam); Hopi: tithu or katsintithu) are figures carved, typically from cottonwood root, by Hopi people to instruct young girls and new brides about kachinas or katsinam, the immortal beings that bring rain, control other aspects of the natural world and society, and act as messengers between humans and the spirit world.

These figures are still made and used within the Hopi community, while other kachina figures are carved and sold as artworks to the public. Other Pueblo peoples and later Navajo sculptors carve figures similar to kachina tihu as artworks.

== History and background ==
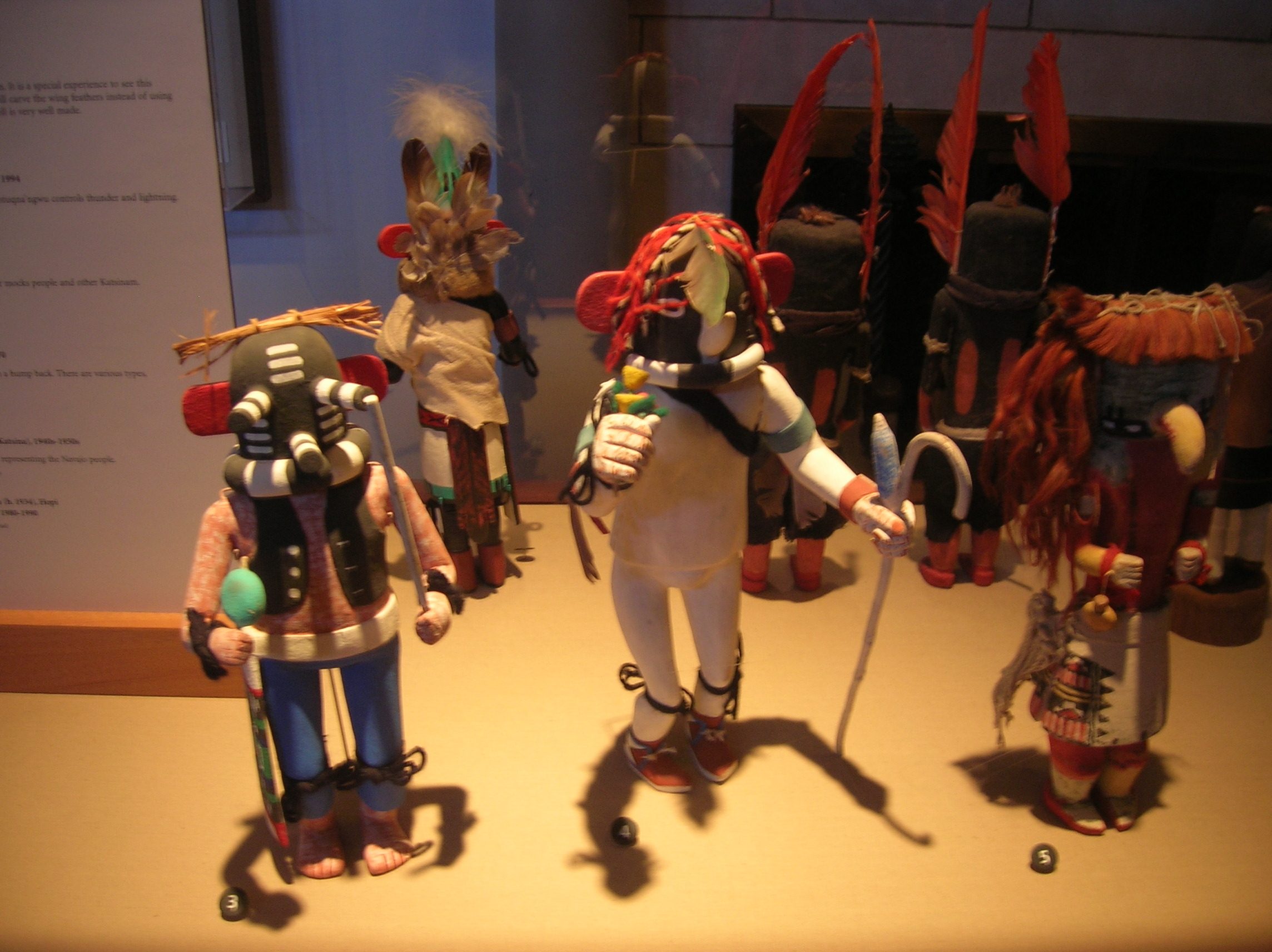
Kachina figures

=== Cultural context ===
Hopi people live primarily on three mesas in northeastern Arizona, about 70 miles from Flagstaff. In Hopi cosmology, the majority of katsinam reside on the Humphreys Peak, approximately 60 miles west of the Hopi Reservation. Each year, throughout the period from winter solstice to mid-July, these spirits, in the form of kachinas, come down to the villages to dance and sing, to bring rain for the upcoming harvest, and to give gifts to the children.

The katsinam are known to be the spirits of deities, natural elements or animals, or the deceased ancestors of the Hopi. Prior to each kachina ceremony, the men of the village will spend days studiously making figures in the likeness of the katsinam represented in that particular ceremony. The figures are then passed on to the daughters of the village by the Giver Kachina during the ceremony. Following the ceremony, the figures are hung on the walls of the pueblo and are meant to be studied in order to learn the characteristics of that certain Kachina. Edward Kennard, co-author of Hopi Kachinas, says concerning the purpose of the Kachina figure, "Essentially it is a means of education; it is a gift at dance-time; it is a decorative article for the home, but above all it is a constant reminder of the Kachinas."

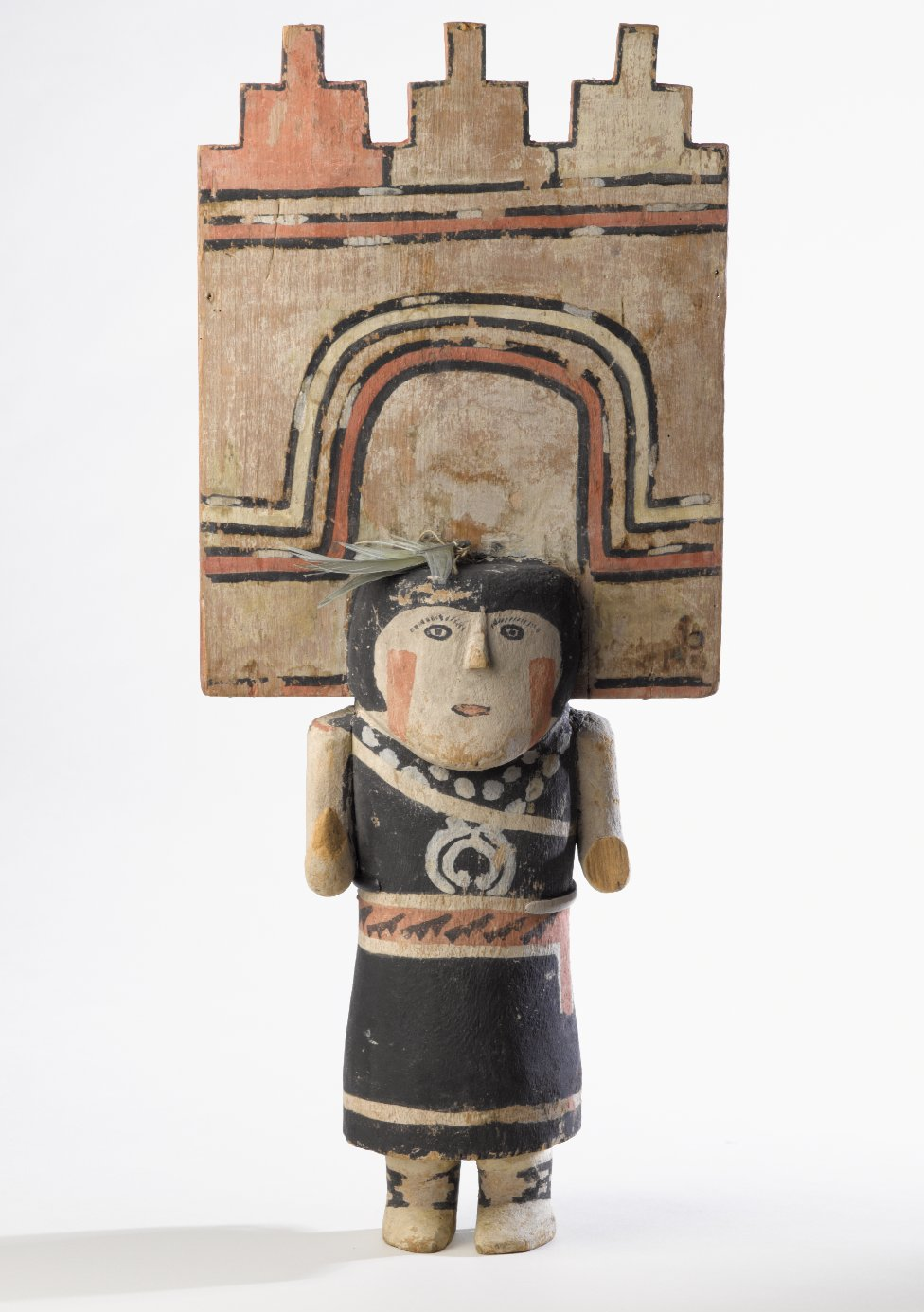
Hopi Pueblo (Native American). Water Drinking Maiden Kachina tihu (Pahlikmana), late 19th century

=== History of the Kachina figure ===
Except for major ceremonial figures, most kachina figures originated in the late 19th century. The oldest known surviving figure dates back to the 18th century. It was a flat object with an almost indistinguishable shape that suggested a head and contained minimal body paint. Kachina figures are generally separated into four stylistic periods: the Early Traditional, Late Traditional, Early Action, and Late Action periods.

==== Early Traditional era (1850–1910) ====
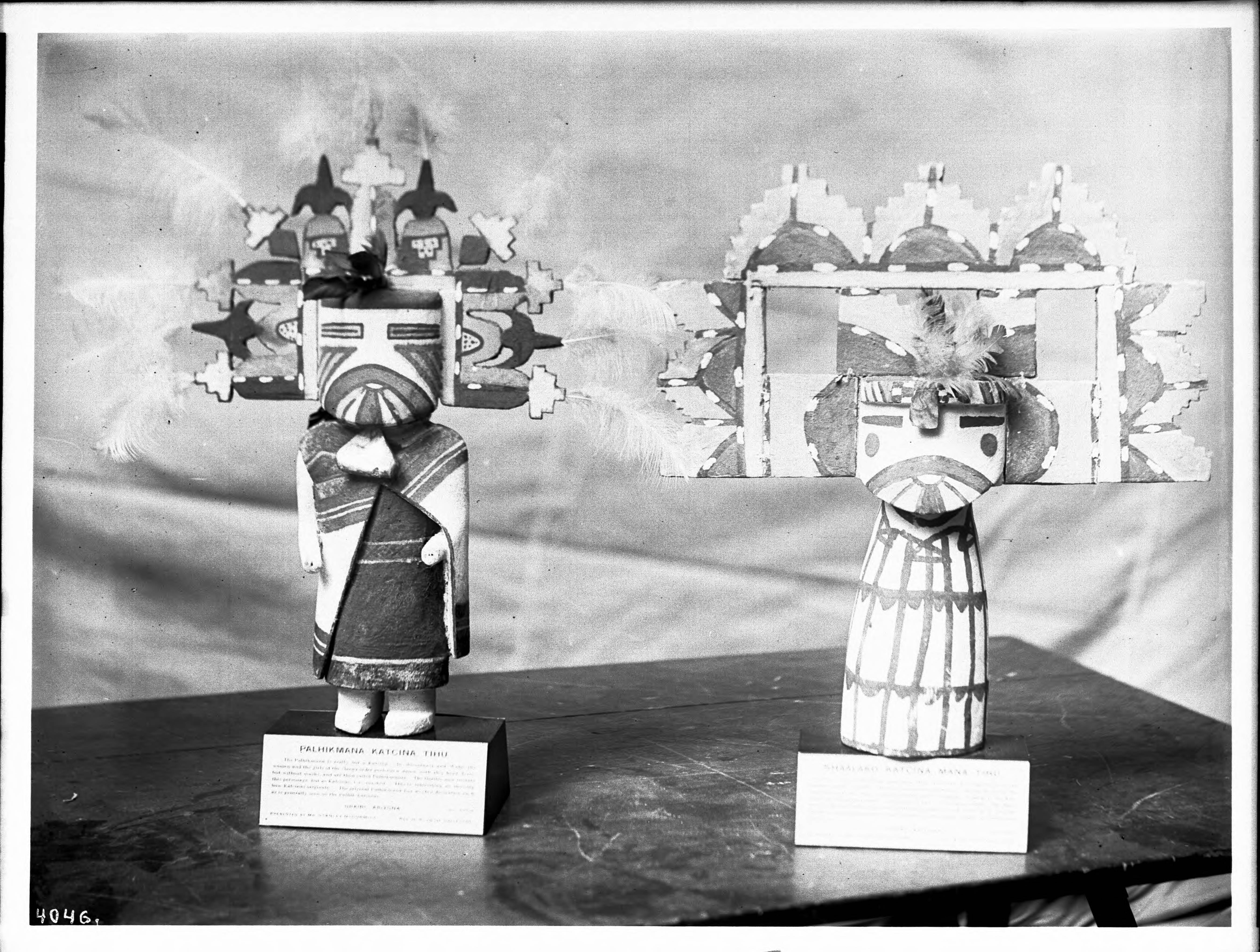
Two Hopi kachina dolls (male and female), ca.1900

The early forms of the kachina figure belonged to the Early Traditional Period. Only one piece of cottonwood root was used to carve the body, although facial features made from varying sources were occasionally glued on. The figures were no taller than 8 to 10 inches and only somewhat resembled human proportions. Sandpaper and wood finishing tools were generally unavailable to the Hopi in this era. In order to smooth out the rough carved surfaces, the figures were rubbed smooth with sandstone and the flaws in the cottonwood root were coated with kaolin clay. Their surfaces were not as smooth as in later periods, and the paint was made of non water-resistant mineral and vegetable pigments. The figures in this period were stiff and only meant to be hung on the wall after ceremonies. Starting around 1900, the figures began to have a more naturalistic look to them as a result of the white man’s interest and trade. The price of dolls in this period was on average about $0.75 (adjusted for today’s currency).

==== Late Traditional era (1910–1930) ====
During the Late Traditional Period subtle changes began to take place towards the creation of more realistic–looking figures. They were more proportional and the carving and painting was much more detailed. Eastern tourist attraction to the Hopi reservation increased in popularity from 1910–1920 due to the increased interest in Native American culture. The elders restricted the tourists from seeing the religious kachina ceremonies, and consequently there was a notable decline in figures carving for commercial purposes.

==== Early Action era (1930–1945) ====
In the beginning of the 20th century, oppressive agents such as Charles Burton tried to restrict the Hopis' religious and cultural rights. However, in 1934, due to the Indian Reorganization Act, the Hopi people got back their religious freedom, and this thus renewed their interest in kachina figures carving. The dolls began to have a slightly different look than that of the stiff figures from earlier periods. The arms were starting to become separated from the body and the heads became slightly overturned, putting the dolls in more of an action pose. Commercial and poster paints were used and the regalia became more organic, as some of the dolls were dressed in real clothing instead of clothing that was merely painted on. The average price of a kachina figure during this period was about $1 an inch.

==== Late Action era (1945–present) ====
The Late Action period of kachina figures contains the most variations of carvings than any other period. Most figures of this period display realistic body proportions and show movement, which are distinguishing features of this period. The regalia in this period are more detailed and in the 1960s, carvers began to attach bases to the dolls in order to appeal to the tourists who didn’t want to hang the dolls on their walls. In the 1970s the Endangered Species Act and Migratory Bird Treaty banned the selling of kachina figures that carried any migratory, wild bird feathers from birds such as eagles. As a result, the feathers of the dolls would be carved into the wood, which led to a new brand of Hopi art: the kachina sculpture. As the carvings became more extravagant and the consumer demand went up, their prices also rose significantly. Prices today range on average from $500 to $1,000, and it is not unusual to see a carved figure by a master artist up to $10,000.

=== Contemporary Kachina figures ===
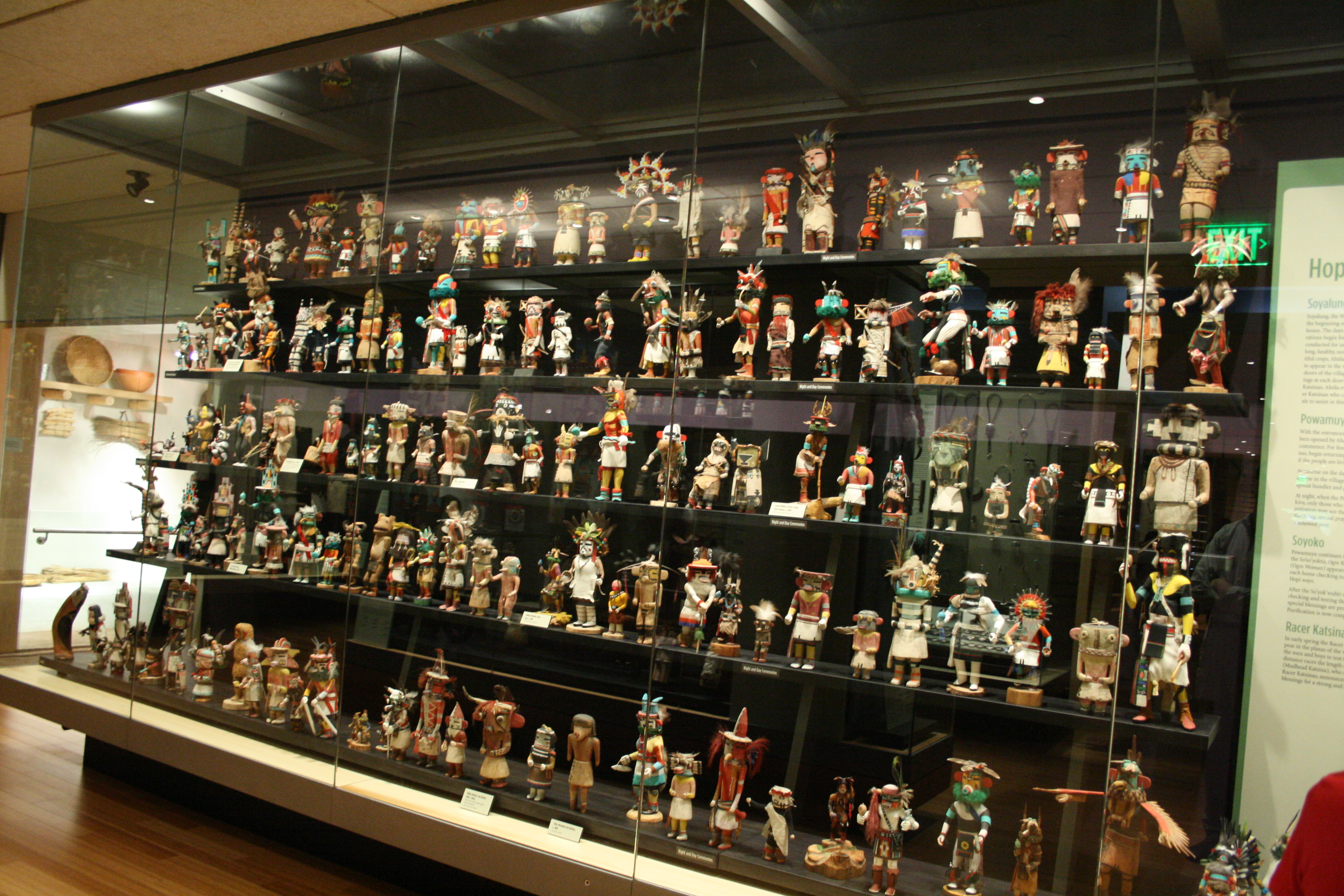
Kachina figure collection at the Heard Museum

Most Hopi carvers today that sell dolls do it for trade and do not necessarily make dolls that reflect authentic kachinam. Kachina ceremonies are still held, but have to now be scheduled around the men’s jobs, schools, and businesses and are usually held on weekends. The dolls today are much more exquisite than those of the past and are very expensive. Women sometimes carve, making miniature dolls that are especially popular in the trade.

The Heard Museum in Phoenix and the Autry Museum in Los Angeles are now home to the major collections of Hopi Kachina figures. Collections can be found in Native American collections in museums nationwide and internationally.

== Features ==
=== General features ===
There are four generally accepted forms of the kachina figures; each form is meant to represent a different stage of postnatal development.

1. Putsqatihu – these figures are made specifically for infants; these are simply flat figures that contain enough characteristics of the kachina so it is identifiable.
2. Putstihu taywa’yla – these figures have flat bodies and three-dimensional faces that are generally meant for toddlers.
3. Muringputihu – these figures have cylindrical bodies, fully carved heads, and are meant specifically for infant girls.
4. Tithu – the traditional, full-bodied kachina figures that is given to Hopi girls aged two and up at Hopi ceremonies. These figures represent the final stage of postnatal development.

In addition to these traditional forms, a modern variation is now being created: the miniature kachina figure. These are mostly created by Hopi women, are only produced for trade, and are not always considered to be kachina figures.

=== Facial features ===
There are two types of kachina figure eyes: painted eyes, which can be round, rectangular, pot-hooks, or half-moons, and pop eyes, which are carved of wood and then attached to the figures.

Additionally, there are two types of figure mouths. The first is the painted mouth, which can be either rectangular, triangular, or crescent-shaped. The other is the carved mouth, of which there is either a horizontal mouth with a wide or narrow beard, a beak that is turned up or down, a tube or a short snout.

On the figure's head, there will be either bird wings, ears (typically large and red), cornhusk flowers, hair, feathers, or horns. The horns can either be pseudo-horns or real animal horn.

The noses are rarely realistic-looking, except when carved into the wood. Some katsinam also have beards of feathers or red-dyed horsehair.

=== Regalia ===
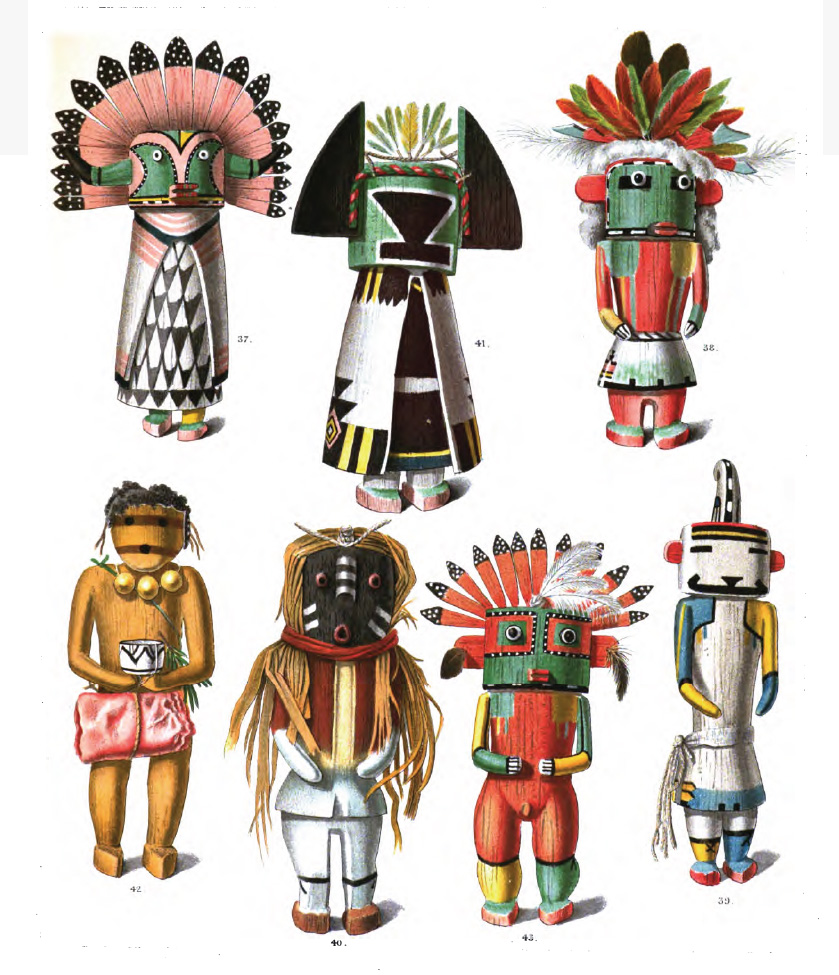
Common kachina figures in regalia, drawings of kachina dolls (tihu-tui) from Fewkes, 1894

There are several common outfits on kachina figures. Typical male regalia includes:

- A white kilt, brocaded sash, belt, fox skin, and no shirt
- White shirt and kilt
- Kilt and ceremonial robe
- A "white man’s" suit
- Velvet shirt, white trousers, red leggings
- Fox skin hanging from belt

Common female regalia includes:

- Ceremonial robe worn as a dress and a shawl
- Manta
- Eagle feather skirt
- Black woolen dress, red belt, and a white shawl with red and blue bands

Kachina figures can also carry accessories that are associated with what their respective kachinam will carry during the ceremonial dances. Figures are portrayed with accessories including hand rattles made from gourds, bows and arrows, branches of Douglas fir, staffs, scissors, crooks with children, and colored corn. Sometimes the objects carried relate to the function of the kachina; for example, Cold-Bringing Woman carries a sifter basket of snow and scatters it encouraging moisture in the form of snow for bountiful crops. Sometimes, to hide the space between the body and the mask, ruffs made of fox skin, juniper branches, Douglas fir, or cloth will be worn. In addition, headdresses are sometimes worn on the heads of the dolls. Common doll headdresses include maiden whorls on the sides of the head, an eagle feather on the mask, or a tripod of sticks worn on top of the head.

=== Symbolism and color ===
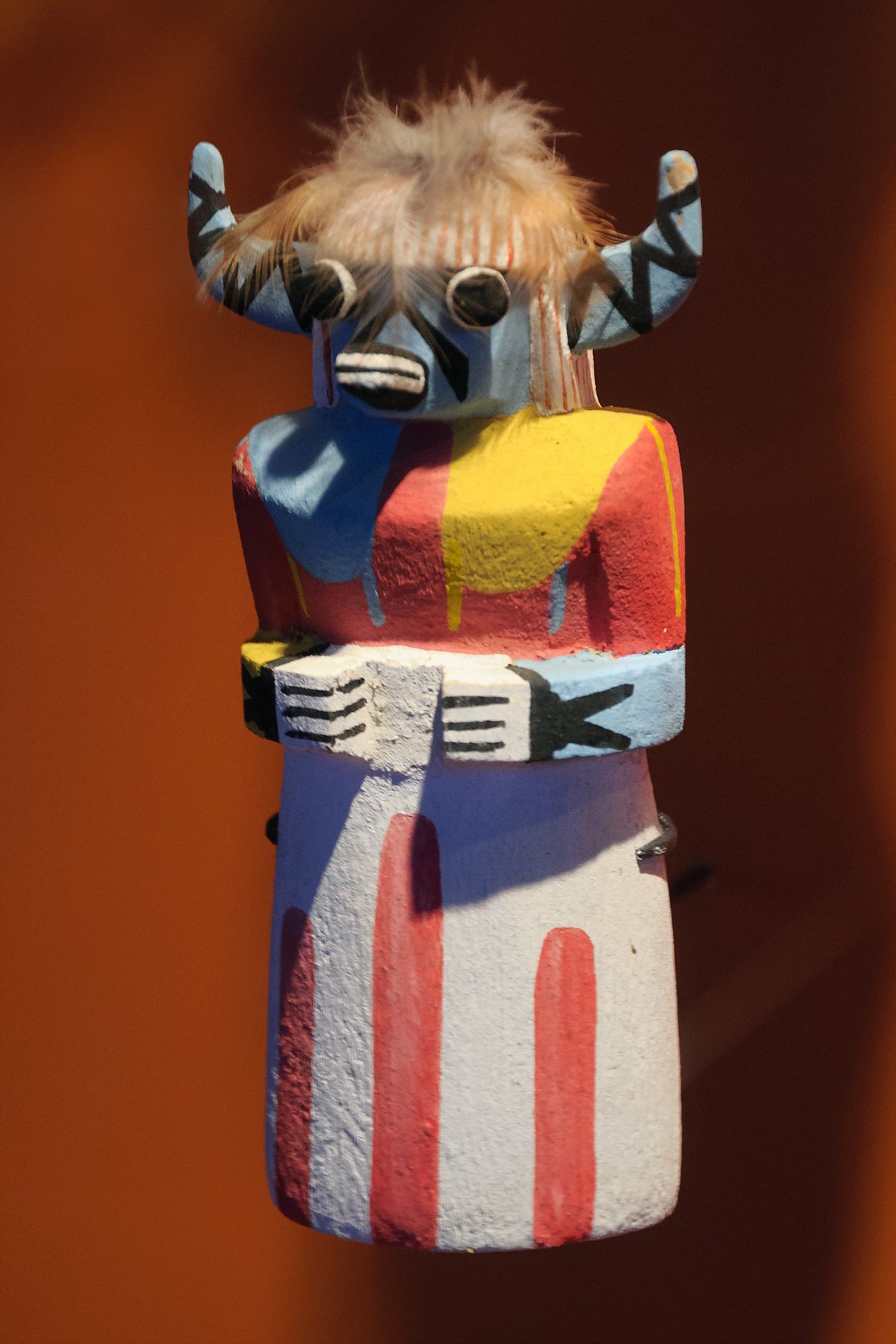
SakwaWakaKatsina (Katsina-Blue-Cow), a Hopi kachina figure presented in an exhibition in Paris.

Every symbol, color, and design on a Hopi kachina figure has definite meaning in connection with Hopi religion, custom, history, and way of life. Animal tracks, bird tracks, celestial symbols, and vegetable symbols represent those particular spirits. Other symbols and their meanings are as follows:

- A pair of vertical lines under the eyes symbolizes a warrior’s footprints.
- An inverted “V” signifies certain kachina officials.
- Phallic symbols represent fertility.

Certain colors on the kachina figures also have significant directional meanings:

- Yellow = north or northwest
- Blue-green = west or southwest
- Red = south or southeast
- White = east or northeast
- All the colors together = Zenith (heaven) and above
- Black = Nadir (the underworld) or down

=== Determining authenticity ===
The first sign of a fake kachina doll is if it is "garish or crudely made." An authentic kachina figure will have proper proportioning of the body and no excessive detail. Hands must have separated fingers rather than tightly closed fists. Details in hair and accessories should be meticulously fashioned. The most valuable figures are made from a single piece of wood; signs of glue on the figure indicate a poorly carved figure. The price will usually reflect the quality, so if a figure seems inexpensive, there is a good possibility it is not a true Hopi kachina figure.

=== Popular Kachina figure types ===
There are well more than 200 types of kachina figures; however, almost no one can identify every single one, as each carver has a different idea as to the appearance and function of each kachina. There are several popular ones with tourists and Hopi, however. Some of the more popular dolls are the Tasapkachina (Navajo kachina), Angakchina (Long hair), Hote, and animal dolls such as Bear, Bird, and Mouse.

== Clowns ==
Clowns also participate in the Hopi celebrations and sacred rituals. They have dual functions. Their most prominent role is to amuse the audience during the outdoor celebrations and Kachina dances. They perform as jesters or circus clowns while the kachina dancers are taking a break between their performances. As a result of the spectator acceptance of the humor and variety of entertaining antics, clown carvings have been a favorite figure for sale to tourists and collectors. Carvers have found a strong market and challenge to create dolls showing the many whimsical clown actions. Their second and subtle role is in the sacred Kachina rituals. The sacred functions of the clowns are relatively private, if not held secret by the Hopi, and as a result, have received less public exposure. The Koshare (or Tewa clown) and the Koyemsi (Mud-head) are two of the most popular clown doll.
