= Angwusnasomtaka =

Kachina of Hopi mythology

In Hopi mythology, Angwusnasomtaka, also known as Tümas, is a kachina (a spirit represented by a masked doll). She is a wuya, one of the chief kachinas and is considered the mother of all the hú and all the kachinas. During the Powamu celebration, she leads the initiation rites for the uninitiated children into the Powamu and Kachina societies. This includes the ritual of whipping them with yucca whips. This is a formal ritual and the whipping kachinas are careful in their actions during the ceremonial whipping. In the ritual, each child takes four strokes from the yucca blade then when the initiatory whipping is over, she raises her skirts and receives the same treatment accorded the children. In English, she is known as Crow Mother.

Her trusted helper is Eototo. Her sons are the black and blue Tüngwups, who lead the initiation rites. Angwusnasomtaka means Man With Crow Wings Tied On, while Tümas, her second name, means Crow Mother.
