= Chaveyo =

Hopi mythological figure

Tsaveyo is the Giant Ogre kachina, one of the Hopi spirit beings. There are numerous Hopi stories and legends about him. These date from the time of the Hopi migrations.

Tsaveyo is generally portrayed carrying a sabre. A. Stephen describes him as he appeared in a Hopi ritual trotting through the plaza looking for victims. He wore a skin mask with bits of cedar bark strung over the top, and he had a war axe and a sabre which he carried like a staff. Modern versions may show him with an array of turkey feathers as a headdress. The slight difference in dress and weapons may be linked to the differences in appearance that have evolved in the isolated settlements on the three Hopi mesas.

Chaveyo may appear in the Powamu, or Bean Dance, and his symbolism is a close likeness to that of other Natackas and Soyokos, members of the Ogre family.

A teaching story told by a First Mesa story teller introduces the evil Chaveyo as the reason for the destruction of Awatovi, a Hopi village. The story follows the traditional form of Hopi oral literature where when the people of the village behave improperly their chief seeks help to end their evil ways.

Hopi Oral history includes the story where Chaveyo headed the Hopi warriors in the Pueblo Rebellion at the Hopi village of Oraibi in killing the Franciscan priest and destroying the church and mission. In days past, when a villager was behaving ‘’ka-Hopi’’ or improper, the war chiefs would call on someone to impersonate Chaveyo.. In full warrior/hunter regalia he would confront the offender ordering him to follow proper Hopi ways. More recently, during the summer celebrations, the Giant Ogre assumes the role of policeman. He uses methods of control including whipping offenders, whether spectators or performing clowns, with yucca fronds.

== Additional sources ==
- Fewkes, J.W. ‘’Hopi Katcinas Drawn by Native Artists. Washington, D.C. The Smithsonian Institution, Bureau of American Ethnology Annual Report NO.21; 1903. p75.
- Pecina, Ron and Pecina, Bob. ‘’Neil David’s Hopi World’’. Schiffer Publishing Ltd., 2011. ISBN 978-0-7643-3808-3. p16-17.
- Pecina, Ron and Pecina, Bob. ‘’Hopi Kachinas: History, Legends, and Art’’. Schiffer Publishing Ltd., 2013. ISBN 978-0-7643-4429-9; pp. 60-65.
- Sevillano, M. ‘’The Hopi Way’’. Flagstaff, AZ. Northland Publishing, 1992. Pp 85-90.
- Stephen, Alexander, M. ‘’Hopi Tales. Journal of American Folklore’’, vol. 42. Champaign, IL., University of Illinois Press, 1929. P14.
