= Llao Rock =

Rock pillar in Oregon, United States

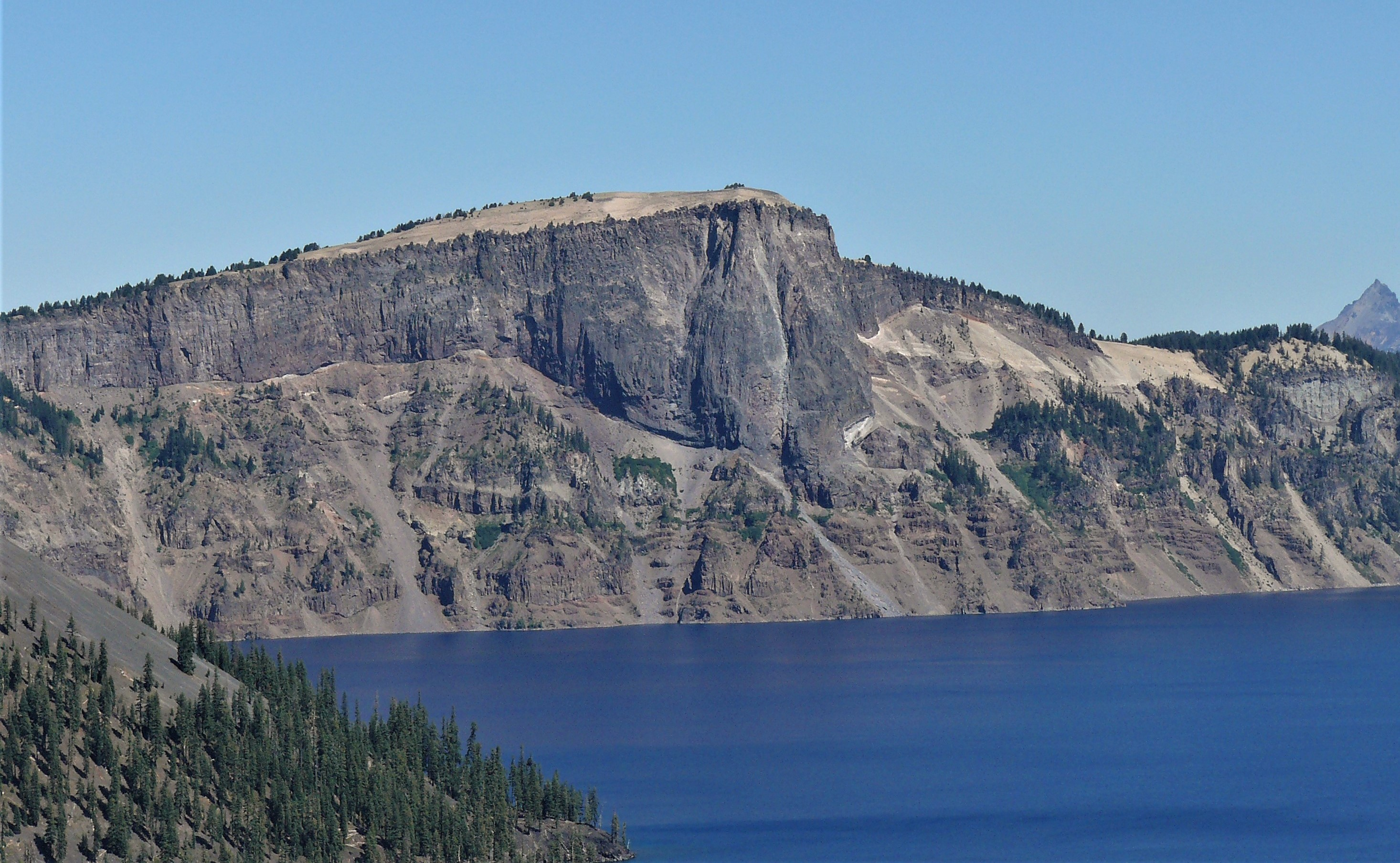
- South aspect

Highest point
- Elevation: 8,049 ft (2,453 m)
- Prominence: 739 ft (225 m)
- Parent peak: Hillman Peak (8,151 ft)
- Isolation: 2.28 mi (3.67 km)
- Coordinates: 42°58′19″N 122°08′00″W

Naming
- Etymology: Llao

Geography
- Location within Oregon Location within the United States
- Country: United States of America
- State: Oregon
- County: Klamath
- Protected area: Crater Lake National Park
- Parent range: Cascades
- Topo map: USGS Crater Lake West

Geology
- Volcanic arc: Cascade Volcanic Arc

Climbing
- Easiest route: class 2 hiking

Llao Rock is a rock pillar in Klamath County, Oregon, in the United States. It is located on the north rim of Crater Lake in Crater Lake National Park. Topographic relief is significant as the summit rises 1,870 feet above the lake in 0.28 mile.

The rock pillar was named after Llao, a Native American god. The landform's toponym was officially adopted in 1897 by the United States Board on Geographic Names. Llao Rock (specifically, the Llao Rock Research Natural Area) has been off-limits to summer hiking since 2013 to protect the rare and sensitive plant species which somehow survive in this windswept location. The closure is effective whenever the area "is covered by less than one continuous foot of snow".

== Climate ==
Based on the Köppen climate classification, Llao Rock has a subalpine climate. Most weather fronts originate in the Pacific Ocean, and travel east toward the Cascades where they are forced upward by the range (Orographic lift), causing them to drop their moisture in the form of rain or snowfall. As a result, the Cascades experience high precipitation, especially during the winter months in the form of snowfall. Winter temperatures can drop below 10 °F (−12 °C) with wind chill factors below 0 °F (−18 °C). In the Crater Lake area, winter lasts eight months with an average snowfall of 41 feet (12.5 m) per year. During winter months, weather is usually cloudy, but due to high pressure systems over the Pacific Ocean that intensify during summer months, there is often little or no cloud cover during the summer.

== Gallery ==
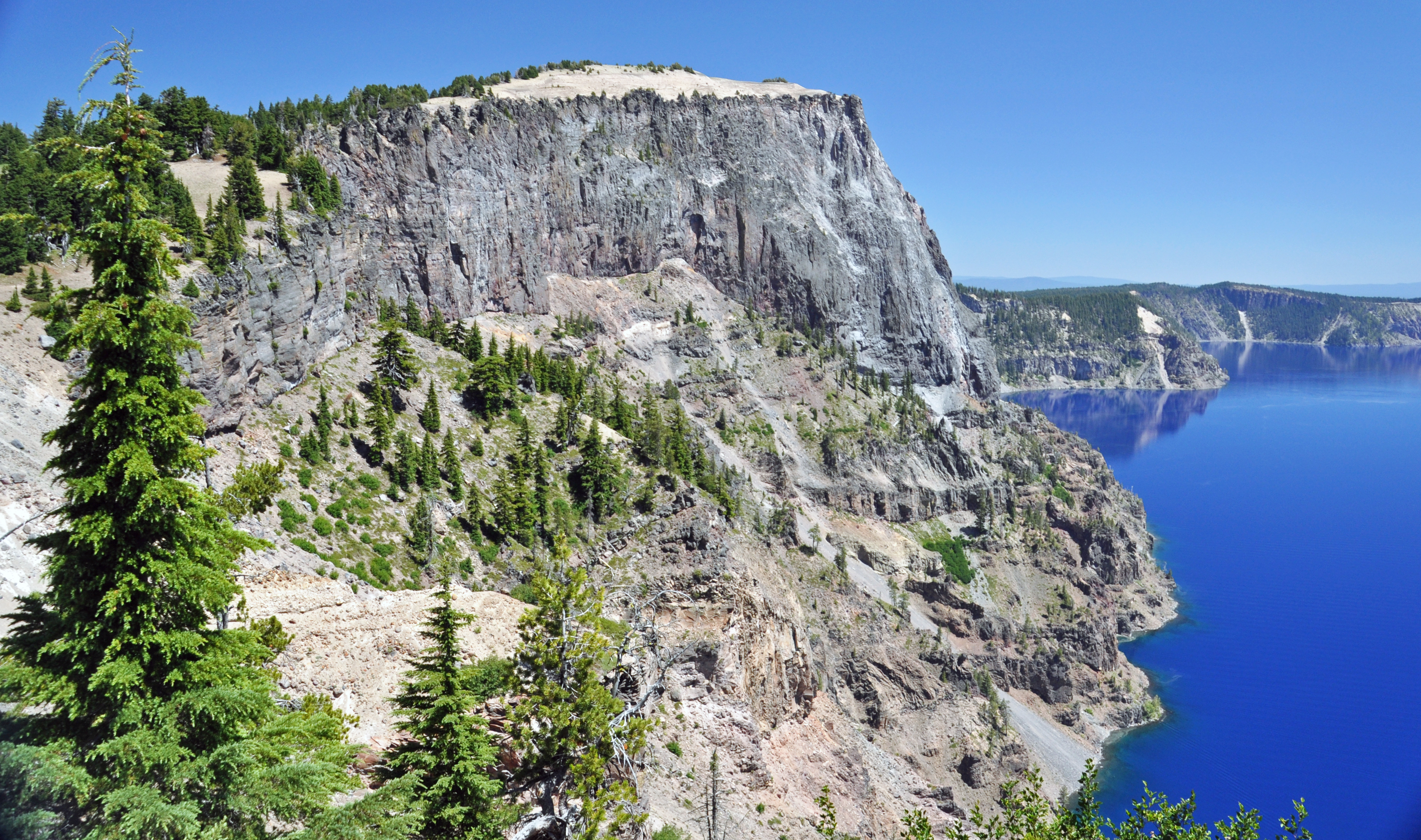
Southwest aspect from Merriam Point

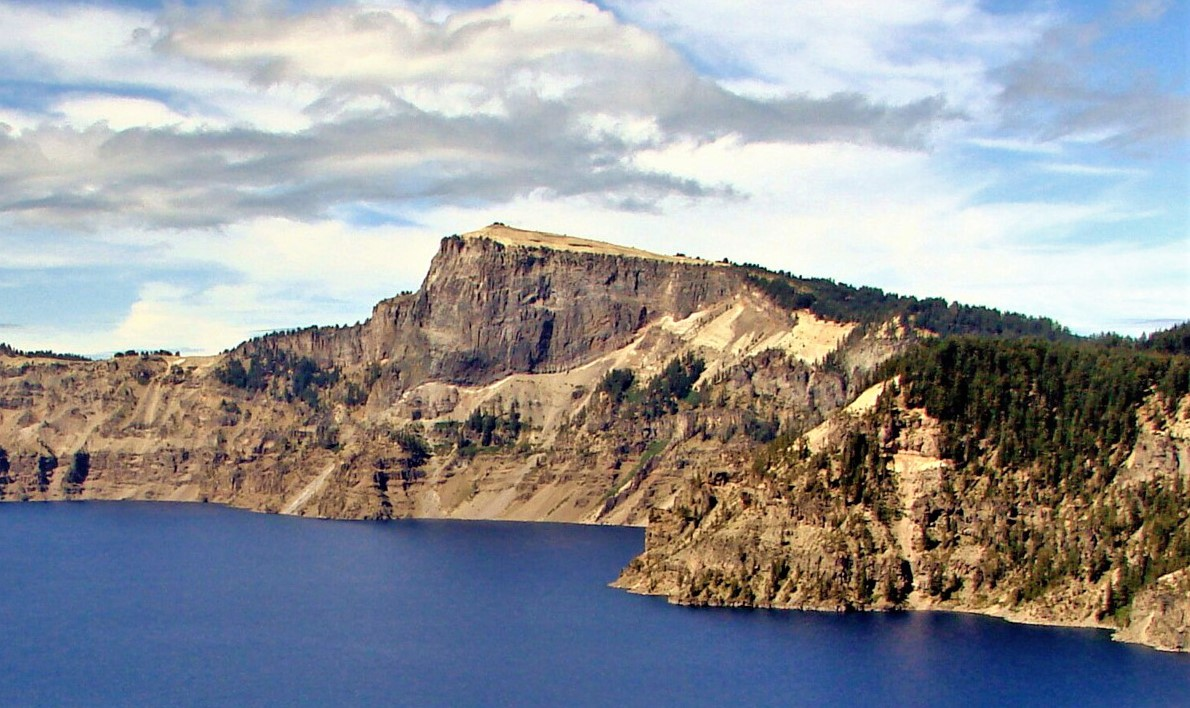
Llao Rock, east aspect

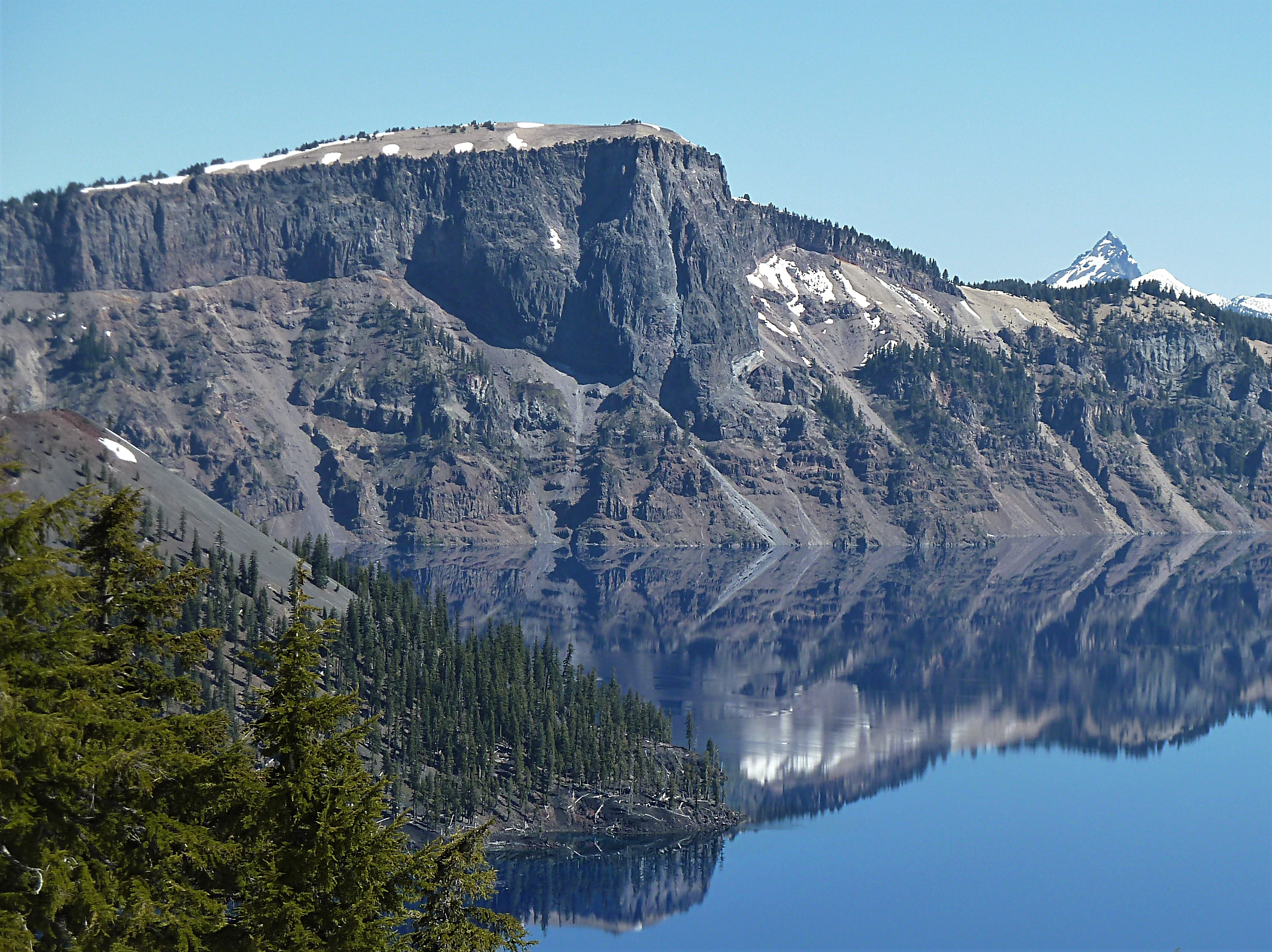
Llao Rock

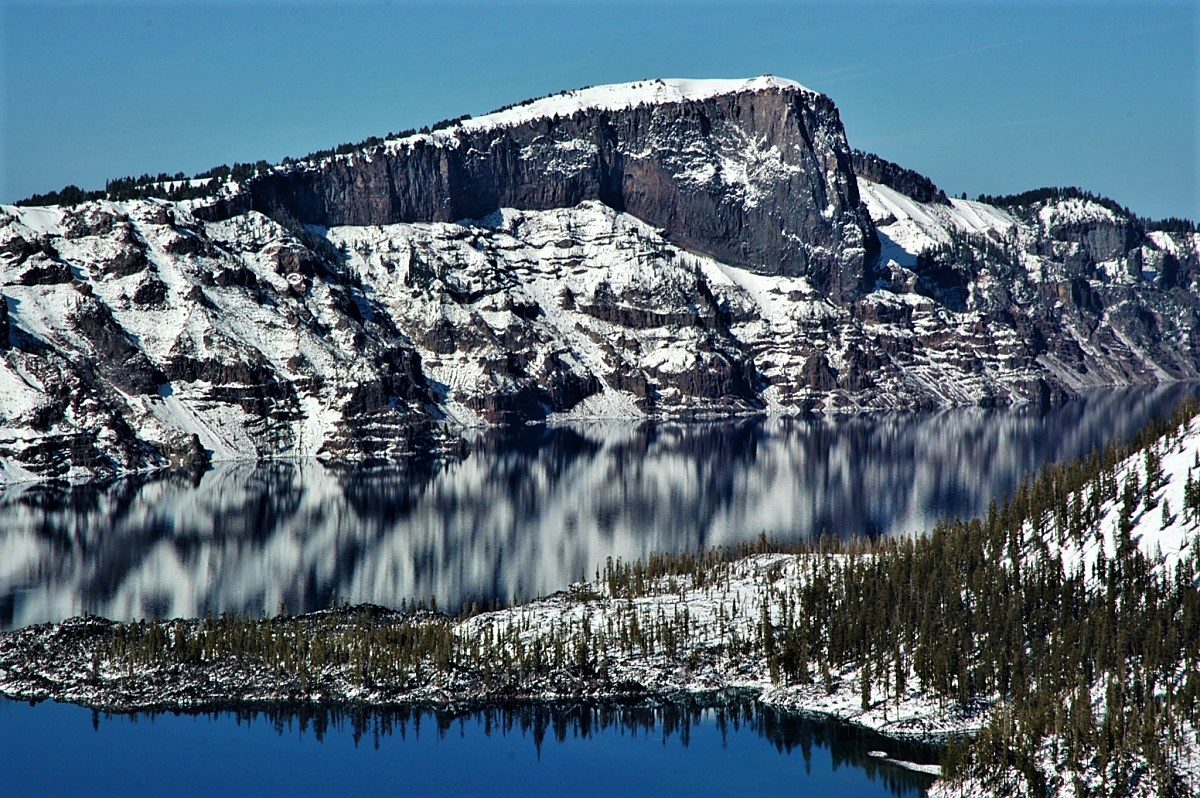

== See also ==
- Geology of the Pacific Northwest
