= Ahul =

Native American mythological figure of the Hopi people

Ahul is a Native American mythological figure of the Hopi people. He is the god of such things as the afterlife, germs, the sun, and the sky.
