= Muyingwa =

Hopi mythological figure

In Hopi mythology, Muyingwa is one of the kachinas (alternately spelled Katsinam) responsible for the germination of seeds. Alosaka is another katchina responsible for growth of crops, and possibly an alternate name or alternate aspect of Muyingwa. As with other Katchinas Muyingwa and Alosaka are spirits represented by dolls and performed with masks at ceremonies (also called kachinas). They are said to live in the San Francisco Peaks to the west of the Hopi Reservation.

Alosaka refers to two wooden idols called the Alosaka. These idols or kachinas (or katsinam) were part of a shrine at the village of Awatobi, situated south of Keams Canyon on the eastern edge of the Hopi reservation. Awatobi was destroyed around 1700, however the shrine was used for at least another 200 years by the priests from the second mesa village of Mishungnovi (Mishoninovi). The wooden pair was kept in the shrine, made of boulders and sealed with logs, and then taken out only for ritual purposes. The last time they were seen by non-native peoples was approximately 1890.
