= Tumas =

Tumas is a given name and a surname. In Maltese it means Thomas. As a Lithuanian surname, it has two feminine forms: Tumienė (name by marriage) and Tumaitė (maiden name).

Notable people with the name include:

- Juozas Tumas-Vaižgantas (1869–1933), Lithuanian writer and politician
- Marina Tumas (born 1981), Belarusian volleyball player
- Tommaso Dingli (Tumas Dingli, 1591–1666), Maltese architect.
- Tumas Fenech, founder of the Tumas Group, real estate and development company in Malta
