= Llao =

Deity of the Klamath Native American tribe

Llao is the god of the underworld in the mythology of the Klamath Native American tribe. Llao fought a great battle with the sky god, Skell, which caused the eruption of Mount Mazama, creating Crater Lake. Llao Rock is named for Llao.

== Llao and Skell ==
The Klamath tell many stories of the powerful spirits Llao and Skell. Llao was the spirit of the underworld who lived beneath Mount Mazama. Skell was the spirit of the sky "above-world". In the beginning, the stories say that Llao was able to pass through a hole and climb to the top of Mount Mazama where he could almost touch the stars where Skell lived. The followers of the spirits could reportedly take the form of animals such as deer, fox, and dove, and they would play together.

== Llao and Crater Lake ==
The story goes on to explain the origins of Crater Lake, known as giiwas in the Klamath language. The Klamath stories say that quarrels began, and war broke out between Llao and Skell. One time Llao visited atop he saw Loha, the daughter of the Klamath Indian Chief, and fell in love with her. He became extremely angry when she rejected his hideous, underworld nature, and cursed the Klamath with fire that rained down on them. The Klamath turned to Skell for help. In response to the Klamath people's pleadings, Skell descended from the sky to the top of Mount Shasta. A furious battle ensued, Skell from Mount Shasta and Llao from Mount Mazama. The ferociousness of the fight led two medicine men to jump into the pit of the underworld as a sacrifice to appease the spirits. Inspired by their sacrifice, Skell fought harder and defeated Llao, driving him deep into the underworld. The story goes on to explain that Skell then covered the hole to the underworld with the top of Mount Mazama to imprison Llao forever. As a final act, Skell covered the remains of the dark pit with water to restore peace and tranquility to the land, which became Crater Lake.

== Last Great Battle ==
Klamath myths include many stories of battle, including one where Llao kills Skell. In this story, Llao is able to defeat Skell in a battle to the death. However, when Llao's followers take Skell's heart up a mountain to celebrate, Skell's followers are able to steal back the heart and use it to restore Skell back to life. During the story of the "Last Great Battle", Llao is killed by Skell. Skell orders that Llao's body is to be cut up and thrown to the creatures of the lake. To trick the lake creatures loyal to Llao, Skell's followers claim the body parts are Skell's, so the creatures gobble them down. When Llao's head is thrown into the lake, the creatures recognize it and refuse to eat it. The story explains that Llao's head is now Wizard Island.
