= Hú =

Hummingbird kachina in Hopi and Zuni dance rituals

In Hopi and Zuni dance rituals, Hú, also known as Huhuwa and Tithu, is the Kachina of the hummingbird.

The hummingbird was, and is, an important bird in puebloan cultures. Hopi legend speaks of the hummingbird as intervening on behalf of the Hopi people to convince the gods to bring rain. Even today hummingbird feathers are highly prized and used ceremonially and in dance costumes. All hummingbird Kachinas are depicted with green masks and green moccasins. Hú dolls are carved from the root of the cottonwood tree.

During traditional ceremonies, the Hú dancer bobs while dancing and calls like a bird. His songs are prayers for rain to wet freshly planted crops in the spring, and women reward him with baskets of flowers; then they scatter to find him more flowers so the rain won't be scared away like a hummingbird might be scared away by a crowd.

The Hú dancer appears in both winter and spring ceremonies as well as the summer night dances in a lesser role.

These dances are often performed in underground ceremonial rooms which are only opened for the Hú dance.
