= Eototo =

Hopi deity

- Nature
- Member of Wuya
- Animals: Bear
- Gender: Male

Equivalents
- Aztec: Ometeotl

[[Category:Pages using infobox deity with unrecognised type|Hopi]]

Eototo is a Wuya, one of the major kachina deities of the Hopi people and the personification of nature. He is the protagonist of the Powamu ritual.

He is a chief and "father" of the katsinas, second only to Angwusnasomtaka. He is similar in many ways to Aztec god Ometeotl, and is considered the bringer of nature gifts. Eototo is said to come from the red land of the south. Every year, he travels north to bring back clouds and rain.

Eototo belongs to the Bear clan and plays an important roles in the Powamu and Niman ceremonies on First Mesa, as reported by Jesse Fewkes, and the Powamu on Third Mesa, as documented by H.R. Voth in his "The Oraibi Powamu Ceremony."

Eototo and Aholi appear together in major rituals on Third Mesa, while Eototo appears independently on First Mesa. Both Kachinam are wuyu or mongkatsinam (chief kachinam). A Hopi legend tells of the close relationship between the two Katsinam. While traveling together they encountered their enemy. Against an overwhelming force, Aholi stayed behind to fight, allowing Eototo to escape. Later in the era of migrations they were reunited. Well aware of Aholi’s loyalty and courage in the face of death, Eototo holds Aholi as his closest friend and ally.

The mask that represents Eototo is a sort of white cylinder with a nest of hair on his head. When calling upon clouds to provide rain for crops, Eototo draws cloud symbols in cornmeal on the ground.
