= Hopi mythology =

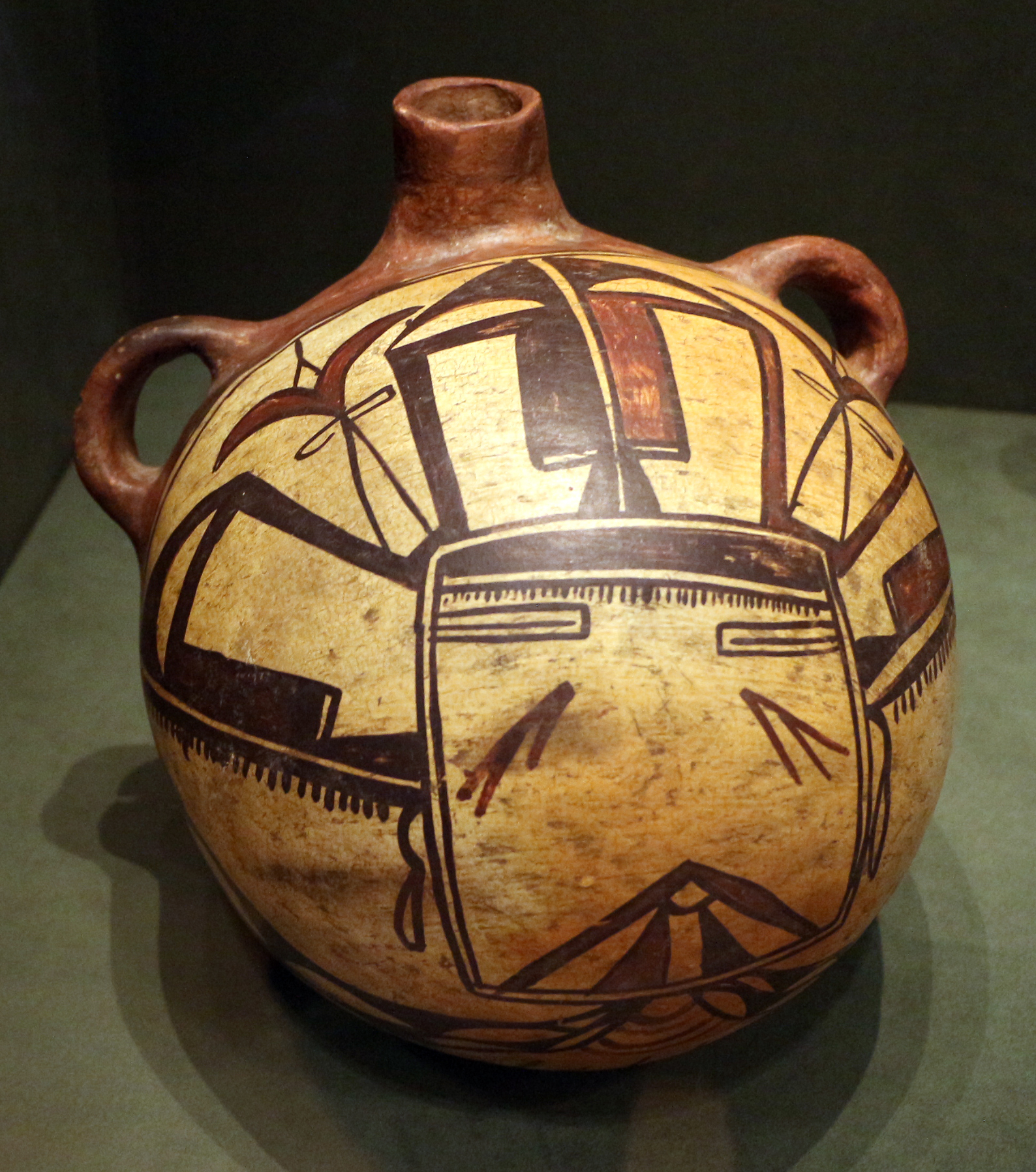
Hopi water jar with image of a Kachina, 1890

The Hopi maintain a complex religious and mythological tradition stretching back over centuries. However, it is difficult to definitively state what all Hopis as a group believe. Like the oral traditions of many other societies, Hopi mythology is not always told consistently and each Hopi mesa, or even each village, may have its own version of a particular story, but "in essence the variants of the Hopi myth bear marked similarity to one another." It is also not clear that the stories told to non-Hopis, such as anthropologists and ethnographers, represent genuine Hopi beliefs or are merely stories told to the curious while keeping safe the more sacred Hopi teachings. As folklorist Harold Courlander states, "there is a Hopi reticence about discussing matters that could be considered ritual secrets or religion-oriented traditions."

== Major deities ==
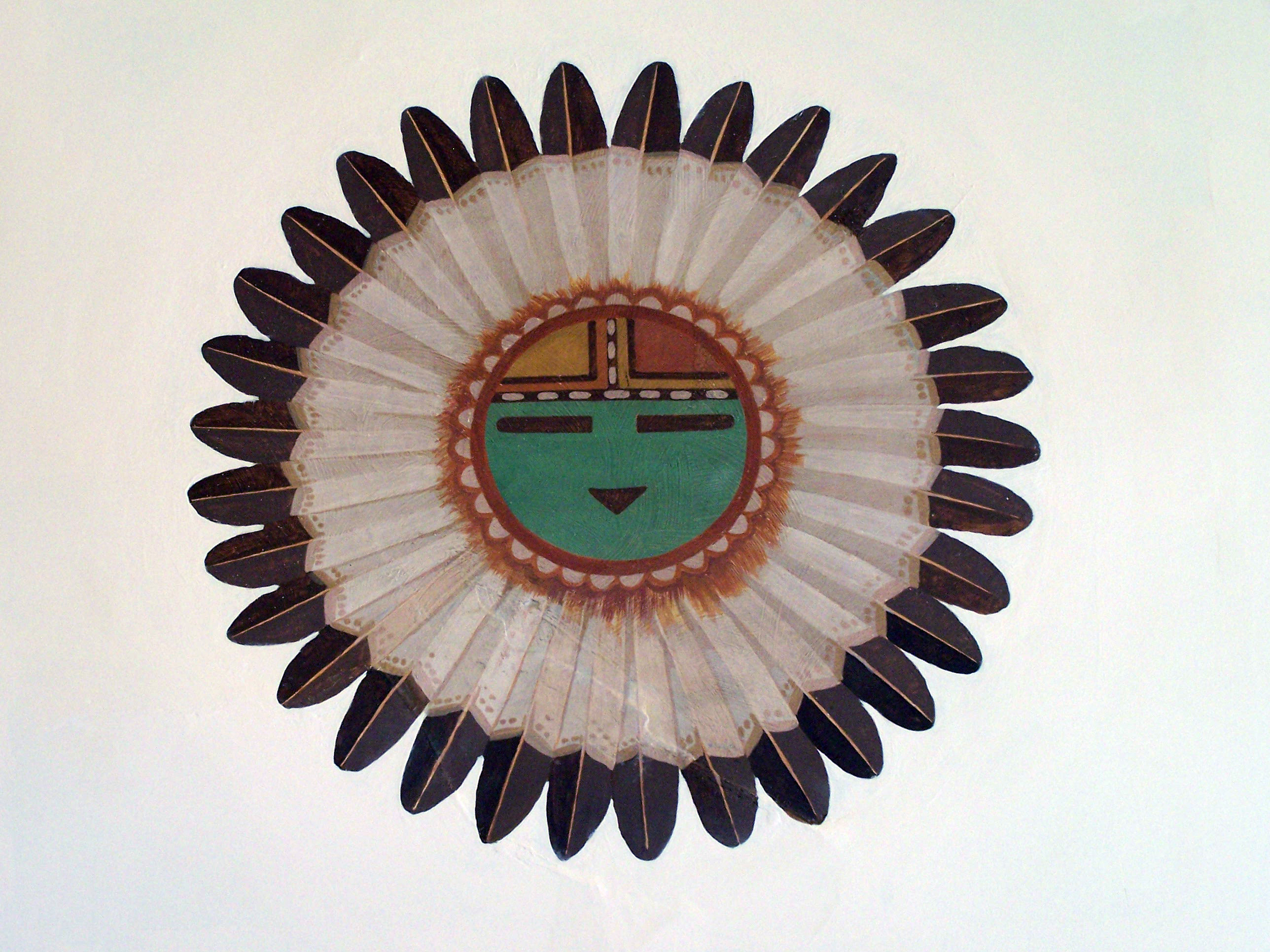
Tawa, the sun spirit and creator in Hopi mythology.

Most Hopi creation stories center around Tawa, the sun spirit. Tawa is the creator, and it was he who formed the "First World" out of Tokpella, or endless space, as well as its original inhabitants. It is still traditional for Hopi mothers to seek a blessing from the sun for their newborn children. Other accounts have it that Tawa, or Taiowa, first created Sotuknang, whom he called his nephew, and sent him to create the nine universes according to his plan. Sotuknang also created Spider Woman, who served as a messenger for the creator and was an intercessor between the deity and the people. In some versions of the Hopi creation myth, she creates all life, under the direction of Sotuknang. Yet other stories tell that life was created by Hard Being Woman of the West and Hard Being Woman of the East, while the sun merely observed the process.

Masauwu (Maasaw, Mausauu), Skeleton Man, was the Spirit of Death, Earth God, door keeper to the Fifth World, and the Keeper of Fire. He was also the Master of the Upper World, or the Fourth World, and was there when the good people escaped the wickedness of the Third World for the promise of the Fourth. Masauwu is described as wearing a hideous mask, but again showing the diversity of myths among the Hopi, Masauwu was alternately described as a handsome, bejewelled man beneath his mask or as a bloody, fearsome creature. He is also assigned certain benevolent attributes.

Other important deities include the twin war gods, the kachinas, and the trickster, Coyote.

Maize is vital to Hopi subsistence and religion. "For traditional Hopis, corn is the central bond. Its essence, physically, spiritually, and symbolically, pervades their existence. For the people of the mesas corn is sustenance, ceremonial object, prayer offering, symbol, and sentient being unto itself. Corn is the Mother in the truest sense that people take in the corn and the corn becomes their flesh, as mother milk becomes the flesh of the child."

== Four Worlds ==
Barry Pritzker writes: "According to Hopi legend, when time and space began, the sun spirit (Tawa) created the First World, in which insectlike creatures lived unhappily in caves. With the goal of improvement, Tawa sent a spirit called Spider Grandmother to the world below. Spider Grandmother led the first creatures on a long trip to the Second World, in which they took on the appearance of wolves and bears. As these animals were no happier than the previous ones, however, Tawa created a new, Third World, and again sent Spider Grandmother to convey the wolves and bears there. By the time they arrived, they had become people." Spider Grandmother taught them weaving and pottery, and a hummingbird brought them a fire drill.

=== Entrance into the Fourth World ===
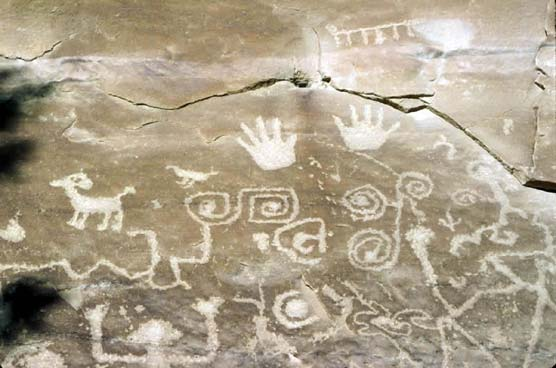
An Ancestral Puebloan petroglyph in Mesa Verde National Park. The boxy spiral shape near the center of the photo likely represents the "sipapu", the place where the Ancestral Puebloans emerged from the earth in their creation story.

Two main versions exist as to the Hopis' emergence into the present Fourth World.

In one version, after evil broke out amongst the people in the Third World, with the help of Spider Grandmother, or bird spirits, a hollow bamboo reed grew at the opening of the Third World into the Fourth World. This opening, sipapu, is traditionally viewed to be the Grand Canyon. According to Barry Pritzker, "the people with good hearts (kindness) made it to the Fourth World."

The other version (mainly told in Oraibi) has it that Tawa destroyed the Third World in a great flood. Before the destruction, Spider Grandmother sealed the more righteous people into hollow reeds which were used as boats. On arrival on a small piece of dry land, the people saw nothing around them but more water, even after planting a large bamboo shoot, climbing to the top, and looking about. Spider Woman then told the people to make boats out of more reeds, and using island "stepping-stones" along the way, the people sailed east until they arrived on the mountainous coasts of the Fourth World.

While it may not be possible to positively ascertain which is the original or "more correct" story, Harold Courlander writes, at least in Oraibi (the oldest of the Hopi villages), little children are often told the story of the sipapu, and the story of an ocean voyage is related to them when they are older. He states that even the name of the Hopi Water Clan (Patkinyamu) literally means "a dwelling-on-water" or "houseboat". However, he notes the sipapu story is centered on Walpi and is more accepted among Hopis generally.

According to Barry Pritzker, "In this Fourth World, the people learned many lessons about the proper way to live. They learned to worship Masauwu, who ensured that the dead return safely to the Underworld and who gave them the four sacred tablets that, in symbolic form, outlined their wanderings and their proper behavior in the Fourth World.

=== Migrations ===
Upon their arrival in the Fourth World, the Hopis divided and went on a series of great migrations throughout the land. Sometimes they would stop and build a town, then abandon it to continue on with the migration. They would leave their symbols behind on the rocks to show that Hopi had been there. Long the divided people wandered in groups of families, eventually forming clans named after an event or sign that a particular group received upon its journey. These clans would travel for some time as a unified community, but almost inevitably a disagreement would occur, the clan would split and each portion would go its separate way. However, as the clans traveled, they would often join together forming large groups, only to have these associations disband, and then be reformed with other clans. These alternate periods of harmonious living followed by wickedness, contention, and separation play an important part of the Hopi mythos. This pattern seemingly began in the First World and continues even into recent history.

In the course of their migration, each Hopi clan was to go to the farthest extremity of the land in every direction. Far in the north was a land of snow and ice which was called the "Back Door", but this was closed to the Hopi. However, the Hopi say that other peoples came through the Back Door into the Fourth World. "Back Door" could refer to the Bering land bridge, which connected Asia with North America. The Hopi were led on their migrations by various signs, or were helped along by Spider Woman. Eventually, the Hopi clans finished their prescribed migrations and were led to their current location in northeastern Arizona.

Most Hopi traditions have it that they were given their land by Masauwu, the Spirit of Death and Master of the Fourth World.

== Kachinas ==
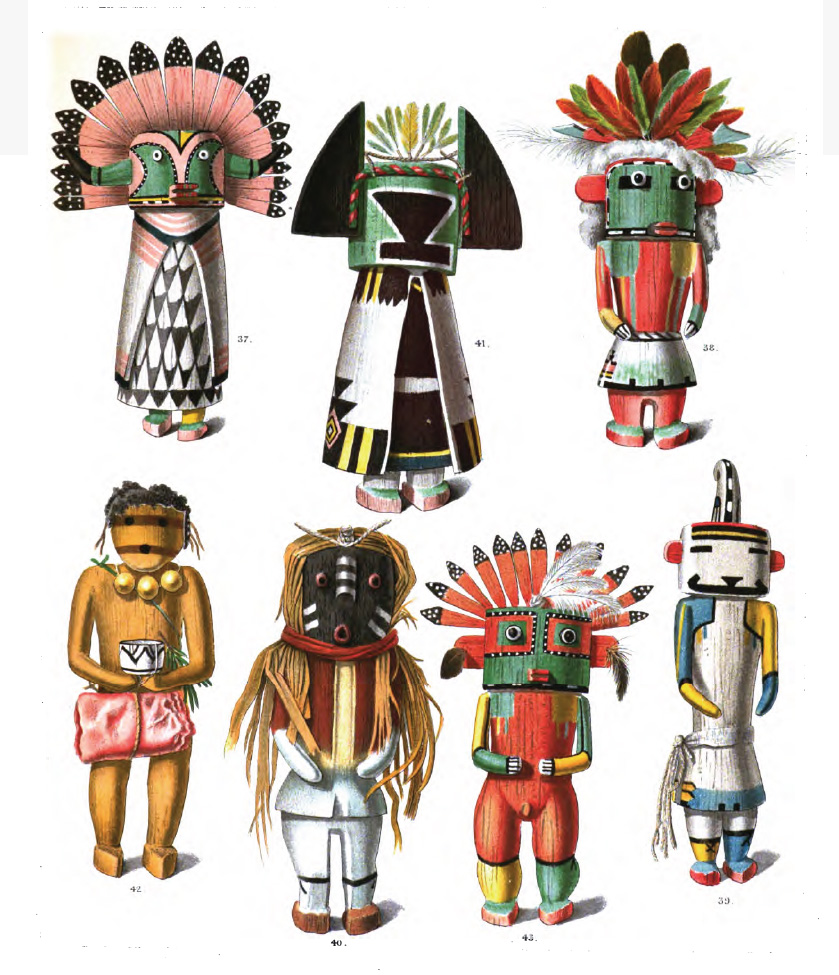
Drawings of kachina dolls from an 1894 anthropology book.

One of the Hopi religious societies is the katsina society. According to Barry Pritzker, "Reflecting the close association between the world of the living and that of the dead, spirits play an integral role in the land of the living. They are associated with clouds and with benevolent supernatural entities called katsinam (the plural of katsina), which inhabit the San Francisco Peaks just north of Flagstaff, Arizona." According to Susanne and Jake Page, the katsinam are "the spirits of all things in the universe, of rocks, stars, animals, plants, and ancestors who have lived good lives."

Around 1325 CE Kachina masks and Kachina dancers appear as rock art.

The Hopi say that during a great drought, they heard singing and dancing coming from the San Francisco Peaks. Upon investigation, they met the Kachinas who returned with the Hopi to their villages and taught them various forms of agriculture. The Hopi believe that for six months of the year, Kachina spirits live in the Hopi villages. The nine day Niman or Going Home ceremony concludes the Kachina season with an outdoor Kachina Dance where the line of Kachinas bring harvest gifts for the spectators and Kachina dolls for the young girls. Different sets of Kachinas perform each year. Most favored is the Hemis group of Kachinas who perform accompanied by a variety of Kachina manas. After the Going Home Dance in late-July or early-August, the Kachinas return to the San Francisco Peaks for six months. The Hopi believe that these dances are vital for the continued harmony and balance of the world. It serves the further and vital purpose of bringing rain to the Hopi's parched homeland.

== In popular culture ==
The 1982 art film/avant-garde opera Koyaanisqatsi references both the Hopi term Ko.yan.nis.qatsi ("life out of balance"), and three Hopi prophecies —i.e. warnings or eschatology.

- "If we dig precious things from the land, we will invite disaster."
- "Near the day of Purification, there will be cobwebs spun back and forth in the sky."
- "A container of ashes might one day be thrown from the sky, which could burn the land and boil the oceans."

David Lanz and Paul Speer's 1987 new-age album Desert Vision has a track named "Tawtoma."

The novel by Tony Hillerman, The Dark Wind, first published in 1982, discusses Hopi mythology throughout the story, as key characters are Hopi men, and events of the story occur near important shrines or during an important ceremony. The fictional Navajo sergeant Jim Chee works with fictional Hopi Albert "Cowboy" Dashee, who is a deputy for Coconino County, Arizona, and speaks Hopi and English, translating for Chee on occasion, as well as explaining shrines and ceremonies to him.

In the 2001 novel American Gods by Neil Gaiman, Mr. Ibis (an incarnation of the ancient Egyptian god Thoth) discusses the reluctance of scientists to accept evidence of pre-Columbian visitors to the Americas, and refers to the sipapu story as historical fact: "Heaven knows what'll happen if they ever actually find the Hopi emergence tunnels. That'll shake a few things up, you just wait."

In the Jordan Peele film Us, Addy as a little girl in 1986 walks up to and into the Shaman's Vision Quest attraction, the entrance of which is topped by a Native American man with a headdress on and his right hand pointing at potential questers. Underneath him, just above the entrance, light bulbs form the words "FIND YOURSELF" and an arrow slowly flashing on and off. Although difficult to hear, closed captioning makes clear that a recorded narration on the speaker system for the attraction is recounting aspects of the Hopi creation story:

These, the earth and water, he divided into places from which life could spring. The mountains and the valleys and the waters were all where they belonged. Then Sotuknang went to Taiowa and said, "I want you to see what I have done. And I have done well." And Taiowa looked and said, "It is very good. But you are not done with it. Now you must create life of all kinds and set it in motion according to my plan." [A fake owl, hooting, pops out of a fake tree, so a few words are obscured.] ... and went into space and gathered substance to create his helper, the Spider Woman. "Look all about you, Spider Woman," said Sotuknang. "Here now is endless space, but in the world, there is no joyful movement. The world ..." [Then the electricity goes out.]

Decades later, when the adult Addy, with her husband and children, return to the same boardwalk where Shaman's Vision Quest was, it is now called Merlin's Forest.

== See also ==
- Blue Star Kachina
