= List of fertility deities =

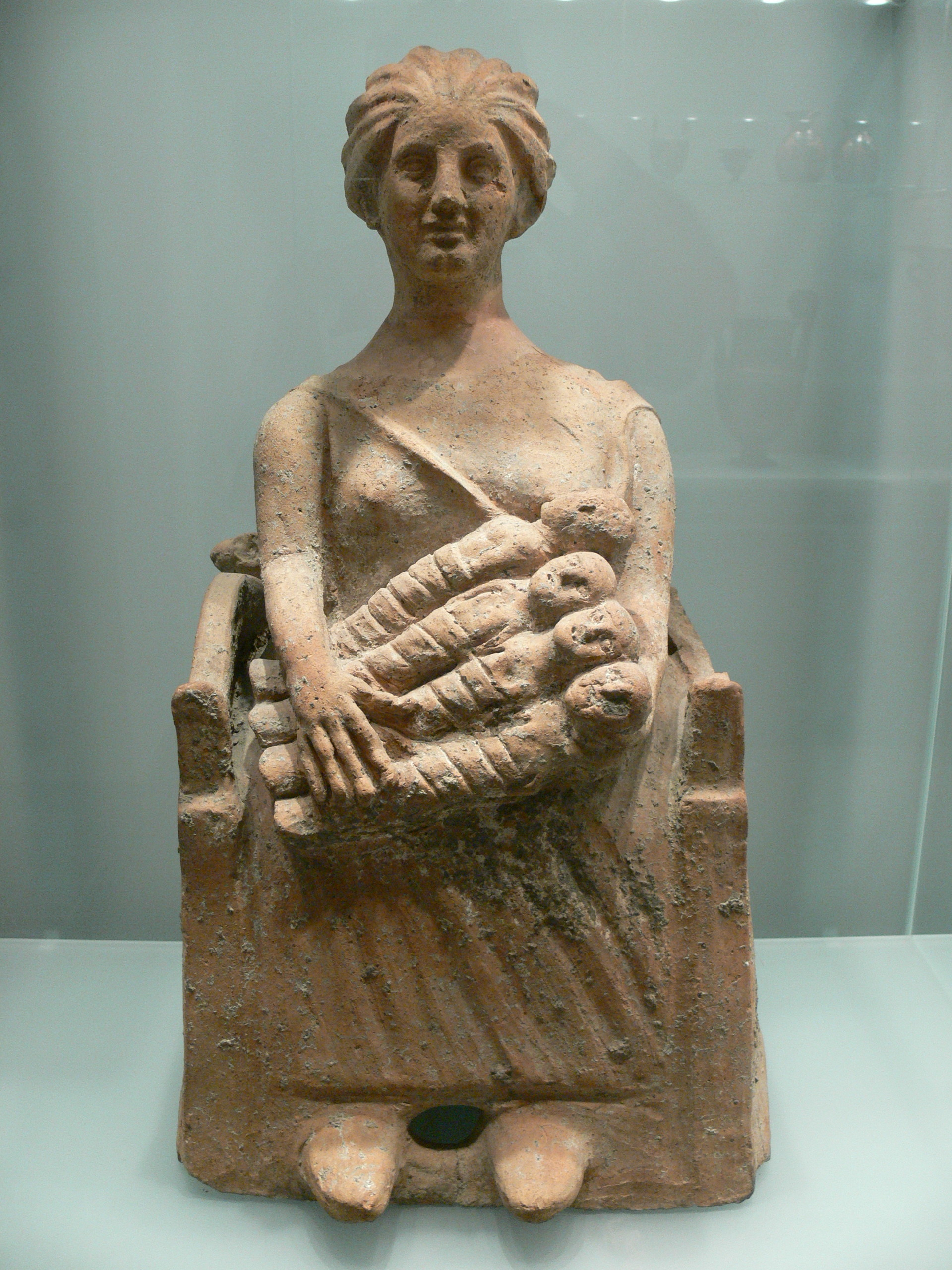
Statue of a goddess of fertility, Copenhagen

A fertility deity is a god or goddess associated with fertility, sex, pregnancy, childbirth, and crops. In some cases these deities are directly associated with these experiences; in others they are more abstract symbols. Fertility rites may accompany their worship. The following is a list of fertility deities.

== African ==
- Ala, Igbo goddess of fertility
- Asase Ya, Ashanti earth goddess of fertility
- Deng, Dinka sky god of rain and fertility
- Nomkhubulwane, Zulu goddess of fertility, rainbows, agriculture and bees
- Orie, Ohafia goddess of fertility

=== Ancient Egyptian ===
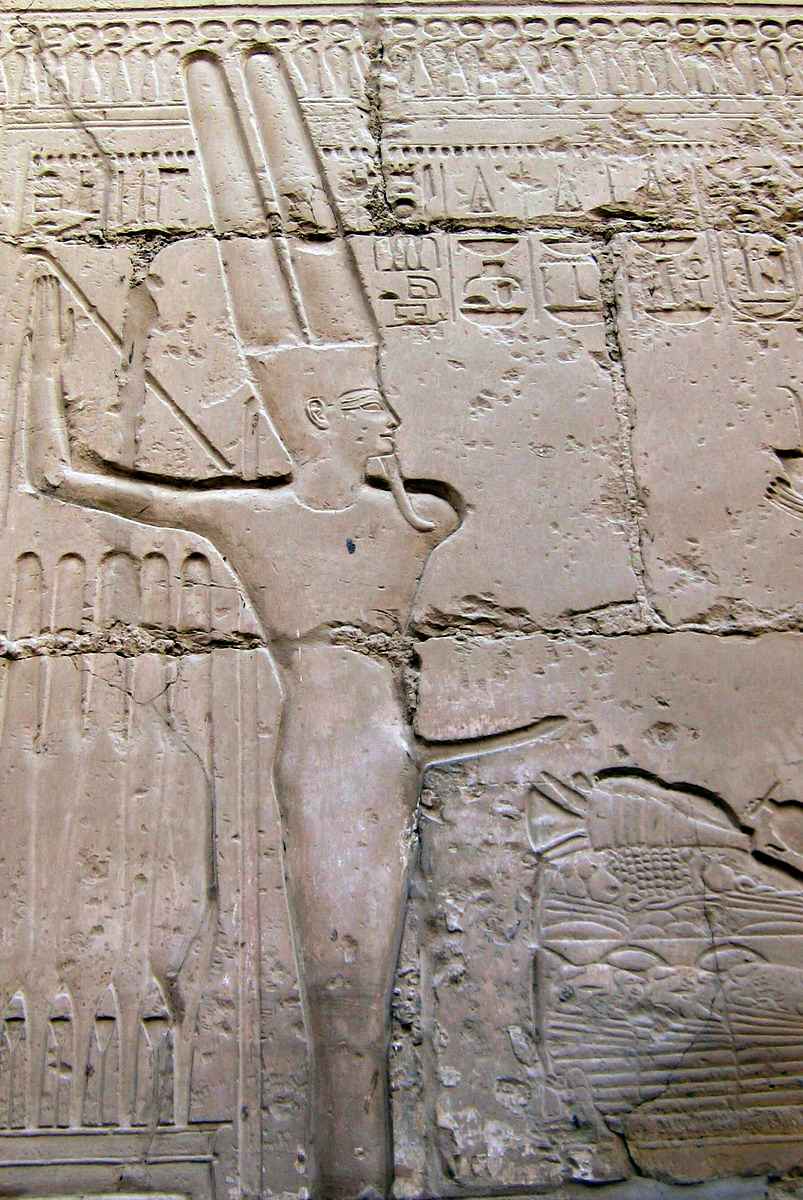
Min, ancient Egyptian god of fertility and lettuce

- Amun, creator-god, associated with fertility
- Bastet, cat goddess sometimes associated with fertility
- Hathor, goddess of music, beauty, love, sexuality and fertility
- Heqet, frog-goddess of fertility
- Heryshaf, god of creation and fertility
- Isis, goddess of motherhood, magic and fertility
- Knum, Creator of the human body, source of the Nile, associated with fertility/ creation of life
- Mesenet, goddess of childbirth
- Min, god of fertility and reproduction
- Osiris, god of the afterlife, the dead, and the underworld agency that granted all life, including sprouting vegetation and the fertile flooding of the Nile River
- Renenutet, goddess of the true name, the harvest and fertile fields
- Sobek, god of the river, warfare and fertility
- Sopdet, goddess of the fertility of the soil
- Tawaret, goddess of fertility and childbirth
- Tefnut, goddess of water and fertility

=== Yoruba ===
- Oshun (known as Ochún or Oxúm in Latin America) also spelled Ọṣun, is an orisha, a spirit, a deity, or a goddess that reflects one of the manifestations of the Ọlọrun in the Yoruba religion. She is one of the most popular and venerated orishas. Oshun is the deity of the river and fresh water, luxury and pleasure, sexuality and fertility, and beauty and love. She is connected to destiny and divination.
- Eshu
- Oya

== North and South American ==
- Atahensic, Iroquois goddess associated with marriage, childbirth, and feminine endeavors
- Kokopelli, Hopi trickster god associated with fertility, childbirth and agriculture
- Hanhepi Wi, Lakota goddess associated with the moon, motherhood, family and femininity

=== Aztec ===
- Chimalma, goddess of fertility, life, death, and rebirth.
- Tonacatecuhtli, god of sustenance.
- Tonacacihuatl, goddess of sustenance.
- Tonantzin
- Coatlicue, goddess of fertility, life, death, and rebirth.
- Xochipilli, god of love, art, games, beauty, dance, flowers, maize, fertility, and song.
- Xochiquetzal, goddess of fertility, beauty, female sexual power, protection of young mothers, pregnancy, childbirth, and women's crafts.
- Quetzalcoatl, god of fertility, wind, water, and chocolate.

=== Inca ===
- Mama Ocllo, mother goddess, associated with fertility
- Sara Mama, goddess of grain
- Pachamama, fertility goddess who presides over planting and harvesting and causes earthquakes

=== Inuit ===
- Akna, goddess of fertility and childbirth
- Pukkeenegak, goddess of children, pregnancy, childbirth and the making of clothes

=== Mayan ===
- Akna, goddess of motherhood and childbirth
- Goddess I, goddess of eroticism, female fertility, and marriage
- Ixchel, jaguar goddess of midwifery and medicine
- Maya maize god, gods of maize
- Maximón, a Mayan god and modern folk saint associated with crops, death, and fertility and Sight

=== Muiscan ===
- Chaquén, god of sports and fertility in the religion of the Muisca

=== Taíno ===
- Atabey (goddess), mother goddess of fresh waters and fertility (of people).
- Yúcahu, masculine spirit of fertility (of crops such as Yucca) along with his mother Atabey who was his feminine counterpart.

=== Vodou ===
- Ayida Wedo, loa of fertility, rainbows and snakes
- Gede, family of spirits that embody the powers of death and fertility

== Asian ==
=== Arabian ===
- Attar (god)

=== Armenian ===
- Anahit, goddess of fertility, healing, wisdom, and water
- Aramazd, generous king and creator god of fertility, rain, and abundance

=== Canaanite ===
- Hadad, storm (and thus rain) god responsible for crops growing, also known as Adad and Ba'al
- Nikkal, goddess of fruits
- Tanit, consort of Baʿal Hammon at Carthage

=== Chinese ===
- Chū Shèng Niángniáng, goddess of fertility
- Jiutian Xuannü, a fertility goddess as well as a deity of war and long life
- Yúnxiāo Niángniáng, goddess of childbirth
- Qióngxiāo Niángniáng, goddess of childbirth
- Bìxiāo Niángniáng, goddess of childbirth
- Chén Jìnggū, goddess of childbirth

=== Filipino ===
- Lakapati: the hermaphrodite Tagalog deity and protector of sown fields, sufficient field waters, and abundant fish catch; a major fertility deity; deity of vagrants and waifs; a patron of cultivated lands and husbandry
- Ikapati: the Sambal goddess of cultivated land and fertility
- Lakan-bakod: the Tagalog god of the fruits of the earth who dwells in certain plants; the god of crops; the god of rice whose hollow statues have gilded eyes, teeth, and genitals; food and wine are introduced to his mouth to secure a good crop; the protector of fences
- Kukarog: the Bicolano giant who was swept by waters into the sea, where his genital can be seen as a rock jutting from the ocean
- Ibabasag: the Bukidnon goddess of pregnant women

=== Vietnamese ===
- Bà mụ, consisting of twelve goddesses responsible for creating each part of the child

=== Hittite/Hurrian ===
- Hutellurra, Irsirra, and Tawara, goddesses of midwifery and nursing children
- Shaushka, goddess of fertility, war, and healing

=== Indian ===
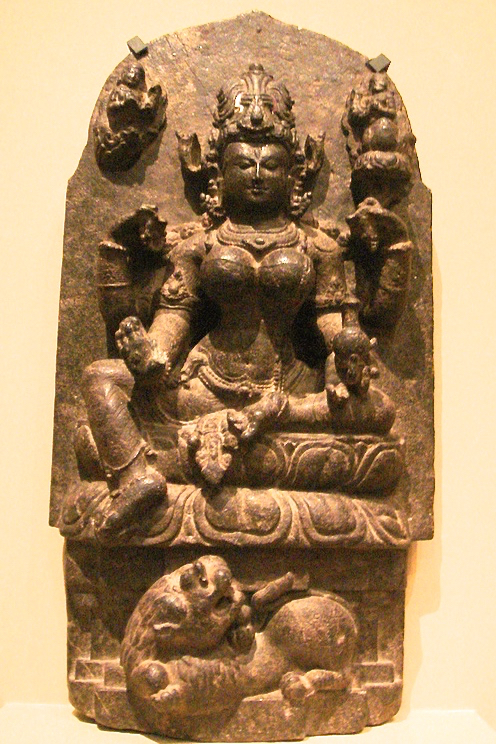
Parvati is a goddess, a female deity associated with the earth and fertility.

- Banka-Mundi, goddess of the hunt and fertility
- Bhavani, goddess of fertility
- Bhumi, goddess of the earth and associated with fertility
- Lajja Gauri, goddess associated with abundance and fertility
- Lakshmi, goddess of prosperity, wealth, fortune, and fertility
- Manasa, snake goddess associated with fertility and prosperity
- Matrikas, a group of 7-16 goddesses who are associated with fertility and motherly power.
- Parvati, goddess of the Himalayan Mountains, fertility, beauty, food and power
- Prithvi Vedic-goddess of the earth and associated with fertility
- Rankini, goddess of protection, strength and fertility
- Sinivali, goddess associated with fecundity and easy birth
- Yogamaya, goddess of fertility and maya (illusion)
- Saraswati, Vedic-goddess of knowledge, music, arts, wealth, abundance and fertility
- Mariamman, goddess of rain, fertility and cure for small pox

=== Iranian ===
- Anahita or Anahit, the divinity of "the Waters" and hence associated with fertility, healing, and wisdom
- Spenta Armaiti or Sandaramet, female divinity associated with earth and Mother Nature
- Ashi: a divinity of fertility and fortune

=== Luvian ===
- Tarḫunz, a weather god who was described as the king of the heavens.
- Maliya, a river goddess associated with gardens and grain.
- Arma, a lunar god associated with the months of pregnancy, who was believed to protect women and help them give birth.
- Kamrušepa, a divine midwife worshipped by both the Luvians and the Hittites, who, in Hittite mythology, was described to instruct the other gods on how to retrieve the vegetation god Telipinu after an initial attempt fails.

=== Phoenician ===
- Asherah, mother goddess of nature, groves & trees (exiled by Hezekiah)

=== Phrygian ===
- Atys, a fertility and vegetation god whose mythological self-castration, death, and rebirth symbolised the seasonal cycle. He was the consort of Matar Kubileya.
- Matar Kubileya, a mother goddess associated with mountains (thus, her name meaning 'mountain mother'), the wild, and fertility, who was typically depicted seated on a throne flanked by felines—most commonly, lions. In Hellenic polytheism, she was often identified with Rhea and referred to as "Cybele". She was worshipped in Rome as "Magna Mater".

=== Japanese ===
- Dosojin, Minor gods of boundaries, fertility, health and protection.
- Kichijōten, goddess of happiness, fertility, and beauty
- Kuebiko, god of agriculture and knowledge
- Inari Ōkami, deity of fertility, rice, agriculture, foxes, and industry; this deity is of ambiguous gender and may be portrayed as male, female, or ambiguous
- Shinda, fertility god of the Ainu people

=== Mesopotamian ===
- Asherah, Ancient semitic goddess of motherhood and fertility
- Ashratum, the wife of Amurru. Ašratum (glorified one), a cognate of Athirat
- Dumuzid/Tammuz, Mesopotamian dying-&-rising god, Dumuzid-sipad (the Shepherd), husband of Inanna
- Gatumdag, Sumerian fertility goddess and tutelary mother goddess of Lagash
- Nanshe, Sumerian goddess of social justice, prophecy, fertility, and fishing
- Sharra Itu, Identified with Asratum, later Ašrat-aḫītu (Ašratum the foreigner) or (the other Ašratum)
- Inanna/Ishtar, Mesopotamian goddess of love, beauty, sex, desire, fertility, war, justice, and political power. Her symbols were lions, doves & the 8-pointed star, wife of Dumuzid

=== Turco-Mongol ===
- Umay, goddess of fertility and reproduction, believed to have saved two children (one boy and one girl) from a massacre. She is believed to have offered protection and guidance to the children, who managed to raise the Turkic communities. In the form of a deer, she is accepted by the Turks to be the protective power of the race, and therefore she is called in many texts as "Mother Umay".

== European ==
=== Albanian ===
- Prende, goddess of love, beauty and fertility

=== Baltic ===
- Laima, goddess of luck and fate, associated with childbirth, pregnancy, marriage, and death
- Zemes māte, goddess of the earth, associated with fertility

=== Celtic ===
- Brigid, Irish goddess associated with fertility, spring, healing, smithing, and poetry
- Cernunnos, horned god associated with the fertility of animals and nature
- Damara, fertility goddess worshiped in Britain
- Damona, Gaulish fertility goddess
- Epona, goddess of horses, mules, donkeys, and the fertility of these animals
- Hooded Spirits, a group of deities theorised to be fertility spirits
- Nantosuelta, goddess of nature, the earth, fire, and fertility
- Onuava, goddess of fertility
- Rosmerta, Gallo-Roman goddess of fertility and abundance

=== Etruscan ===
- Fufluns, god of plant life, happiness, health, and growth in all things, equivalent to the Greek Dionysus
- Thesan, goddess of the dawn, associated with the generation of life
- Turan, goddess of love, fertility and vitality

=== Finno-Ugric ===
- Äkräs, Finnish god of fertility
- Rauni or Raun, Finnish-Estonian goddess of fertility
- Peko or Pellon-Pekko, Karelian-Seto god of fertility
- Metsik, West Estonian spirit of fertility
- Norovava, Mordovian goddess of fertility
- Šun-Šočõnava, Mari goddess of fertility and birth
- Mu-Kyldyśin, Udmurt god of fertility and earth
- Zarni-Ań, Komi goddess of fertility, represented by a golden woman
- Babba or Aranyanya, Hungarian goddess fertility, represented by a golden woman
- Kalteš-Ekwa, Ob-Ugric goddess of fertility, represented by a golden woman

=== Germanic ===
- Ēostre, spring and fertility goddess; in earlier times probably a dawn goddess as her name is cognate to Eos
- Freyr, god associated with peace, marriages, rain, sunshine, and fertility, both of the land and people
- Freyja, a goddess associated with fertility and sister of the above god
- Frigg, goddess associated with prophecy, marriage, and childbirth; in one myth, she also demonstrates a more direct connection with fertility, as a king and queen pray to her for a child
- Gefjun, Danish goddess of ploughing and possibly fertility
- Nerthus, earth goddess associated with fertility
- Njörðr, since his name is cognate with the above goddess, it's possible he was originally an earth/fertility deity before transforming into a sea god thanked for a bountiful catch
- Thor, associated with the bringing of rain

=== Greek ===
- Aphrodite, goddess of beauty, love, pleasure, sexuality, procreation and fertility.
- Aphaea, local goddess associated with fertility and the agricultural cycle
- Artemis, goddess of the hunt, the wilderness, wild animals, the Moon, chastity and childbirth
- Demeter, goddess of the harvest, agriculture, fertility and sacred law
- Dionysus, god of wine, grapes, and festivity, associated with fertility, particularly that of the vine and males

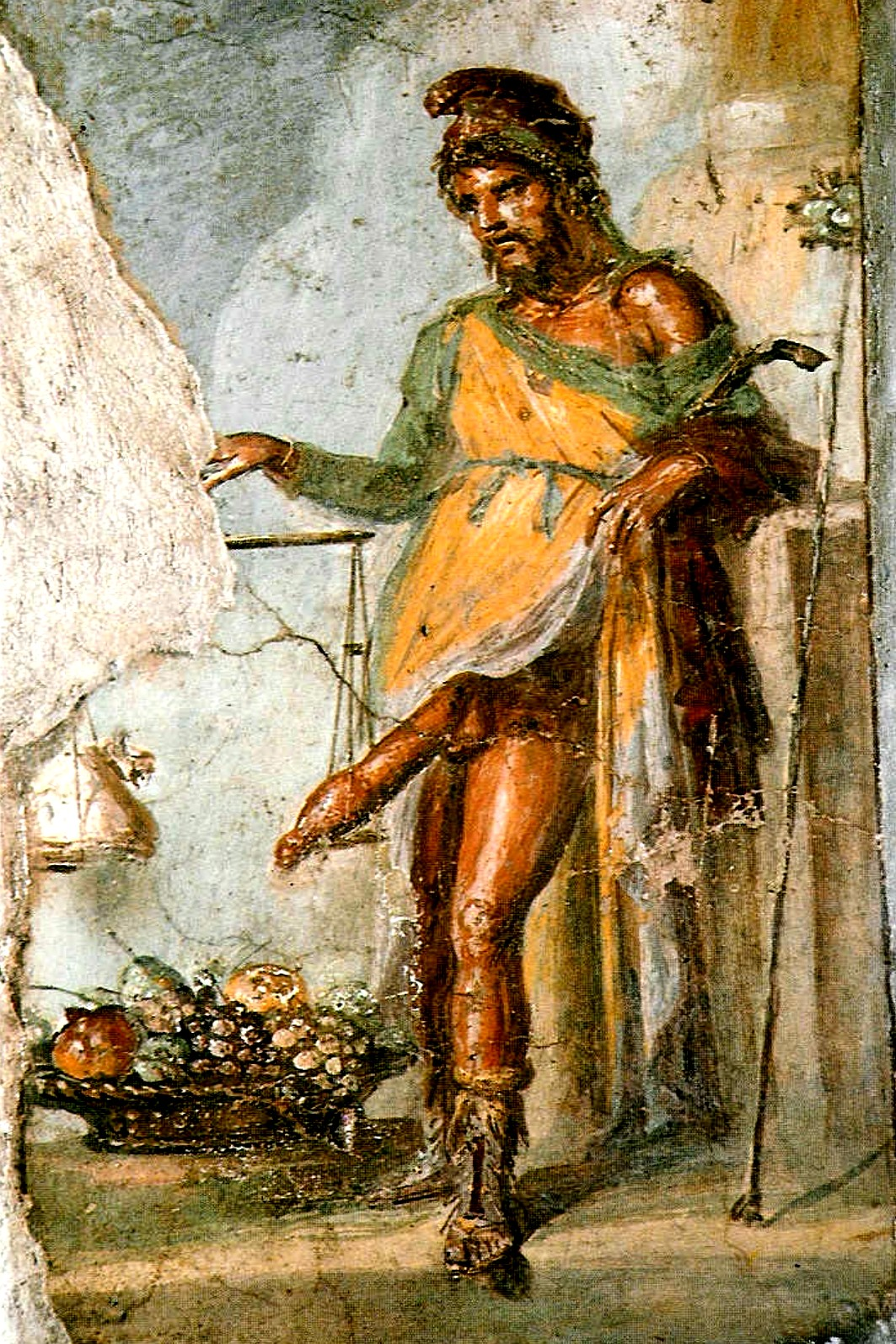
Priapus, Greek god of fertility, gardens and male genitalia

- Eros, a son of Aphrodite and god of procreation, and erotic and sexual love
- Hermes, messenger of the gods, possibly associated with male fertility
- Hera, goddess of marriage, women, women's fertility, childbirth
- Heracles, god of strength and athletes, had an association with male fertility as well as agriculture.
- Ilithyia, (also called Eileithyia) goddess of childbirth and midwifery
- Pan, god of shepherds and flocks, associated with fertility, particularly that of animals
- Persephone, goddess of springtime, associated with fertility of plants and especially flowers, as well as general fertility of spring
- Phanes, primeval deity of procreation and new life
- Priapus, rustic god of fertility, protection of livestock, fruit plants, gardens, and male genitalia
- Tychon, minor daemon of fertility
- Phales, daemon, incarnation of the Phallus, associated with Dionysus

=== Irish ===
- Dagda

=== Roman ===
- Bacchus, Roman version of Dionysus, identified with Roman Liber, god of agricultural and male fertility
- Bona Dea, goddess of fertility, healing, virginity, and women
- Candelifera, goddess of childbirth
- Carmenta, goddess of childbirth and prophecy
- Domidicus, the god who leads the bride home
- Domitius, the god who installs the bride
- Fascinus, embodiment of the divine phallus
- Fecunditas, goddess of fertility
- Feronia, goddess associated with fertility and abundance
- Flora, goddess of flowers and springtime
- Inuus, god of sexual intercourse
- Jugatinus, the god who joins the pair in marriage
- Juno, goddess of marriage and childbirth, equivalent to the Greek goddess Hera; has the epithet Lucina
- Liber, god of viniculture, wine, and male fertility, equivalent to Greek Dionysus; in archaic Lavinium, a phallic deity
- Libera, female equivalent of Liber, also identified with Proserpina Romanised form of Greek Persephone
- Manturna, the goddess who kept the bride at home
- Mater Matuta, deity of female maturation also protector in childbirth.
- Mutunus Tutunus, phallic marriage deity associated with the Greek god Priapus
- Ops, fertility and earth goddess of abundance, prosperity, and agriculture
- Partula, goddess of childbirth, who determined the duration of each pregnancy
- Pertunda, goddess who enables sexual penetration of the virgin bride; an epithet of Juno
- Picumnus, god of fertility, agriculture, matrimony, infants, and children
- Prema, goddess who made the bride submissive, allowing penetration; also an epithet of Juno, who has the same function
- Robigus, fertility god who protects crops against disease
- Subigus, the god who subdues the bride to the husband's will
- Venus, goddess of beauty, love, desire, sex and fertility
- Virginiensis, the goddess who unties the girdle of the bride.
- Dea Nutrix, a conjectured nursing goddess in Roman Britain and Gaul

=== Sami ===
- Beiwe, goddess of fertility and sanity
- Rana Niejta, goddess of spring and fertility

=== Slavic ===
- Dzydzilelya, Polish goddess of love, marriage, sexuality and fertility
- Jarilo, god of fertility, spring, the harvest and war
- Kostroma, goddess of fertility
- Mokoš, Old Russian goddess of fertility, the Mother Goddess, protector of women's work and women's destiny
- Siebog, god of love and marriage
- Svetovid, god of war, fertility, and abundance
- Živa, goddess of love and fertility

== Oceanian ==
- Gedi (mythology), Fijian god of fertility, who taught mankind the use of fire
- Makemake, Rapa Nui creator-god, associated with fertility
- Tagroa Siria, Fijian god associated with fertility
- Sido/Soido, Melanesian god associated with fertility
- Tangaroa, Rarotongan god of the sea and creation, associated with fertility

=== Hawaiian ===
- Haumea, goddess of fertility and childbirth
- Kamapua'a, demi-god of fertility
- Laka, patron of the hula dance and god of fertility
- Lono, god associated with fertility, agriculture, rainfall, and music
- Nuakea, goddess of lactation

=== Indigenous Australian ===
- Anjea, goddess or spirit of fertility
- Birrahgnooloo, Kamilaroi goddess of fertility
- Dilga, Karadjeri goddess of fertility and growth
- Julunggul, Yolngu rainbow snake goddess associated with fertility, initiation, rebirth and the weather
- Kunapipi, mother goddess and the patron deity of many heroes
- Rainbow Serpent, creator god and god of rain and fertility
- Ungud, snake god or goddess associated with rainbows and the fertility and erections of the tribe's shaman
- Wollunqua, snake god of rain and fertility

== See also ==
- The Dinner Party-this artwork features a place setting for Fertile Goddess.
- Fertility rite
- Fertility and religion
- Earth Mother
- Religion and agriculture
- Agricultural spiritualism
- Lists of deities in Sanamahism
- Earth goddess
