= Native American religions =

Systems of faith and worship of the Native Americans

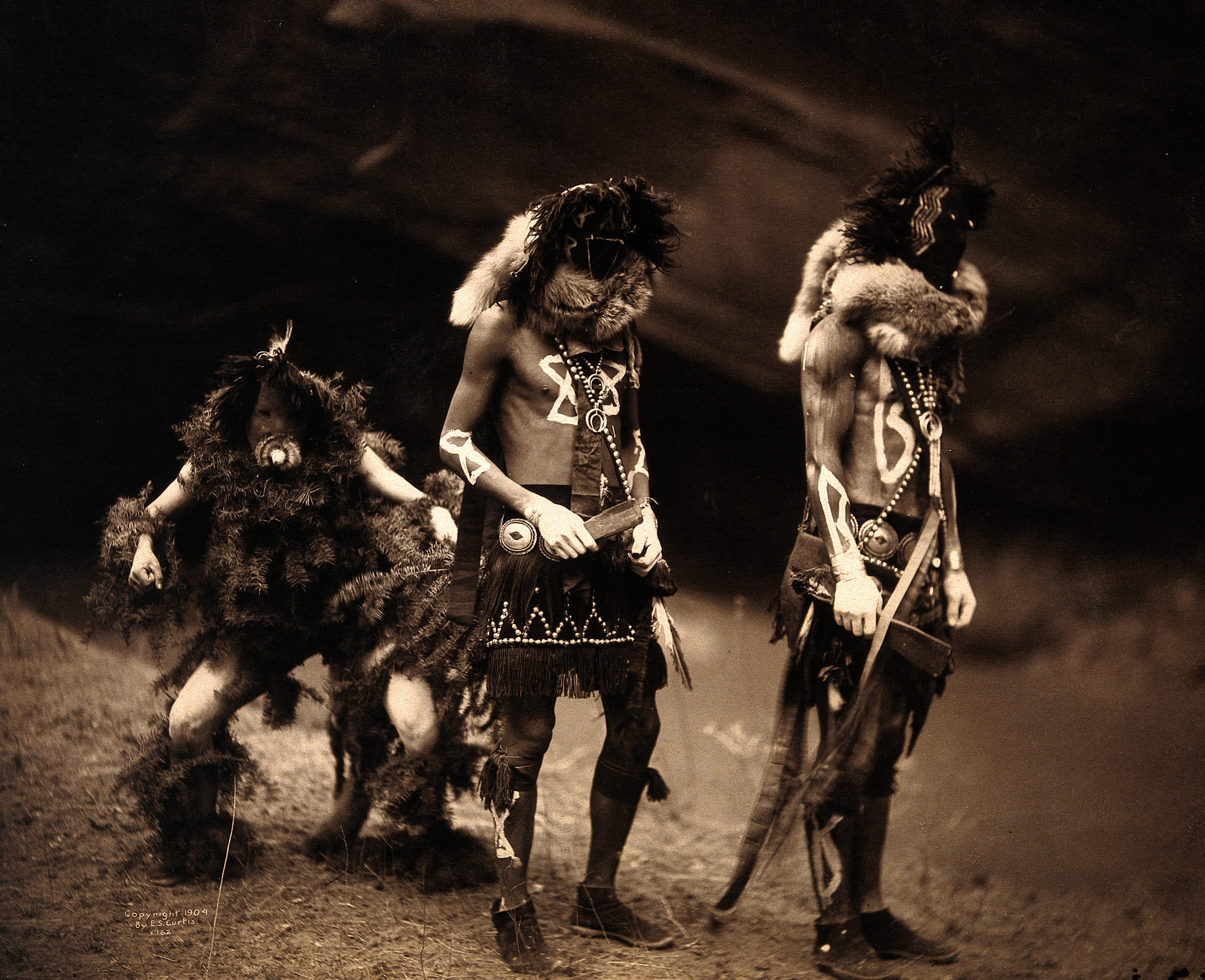
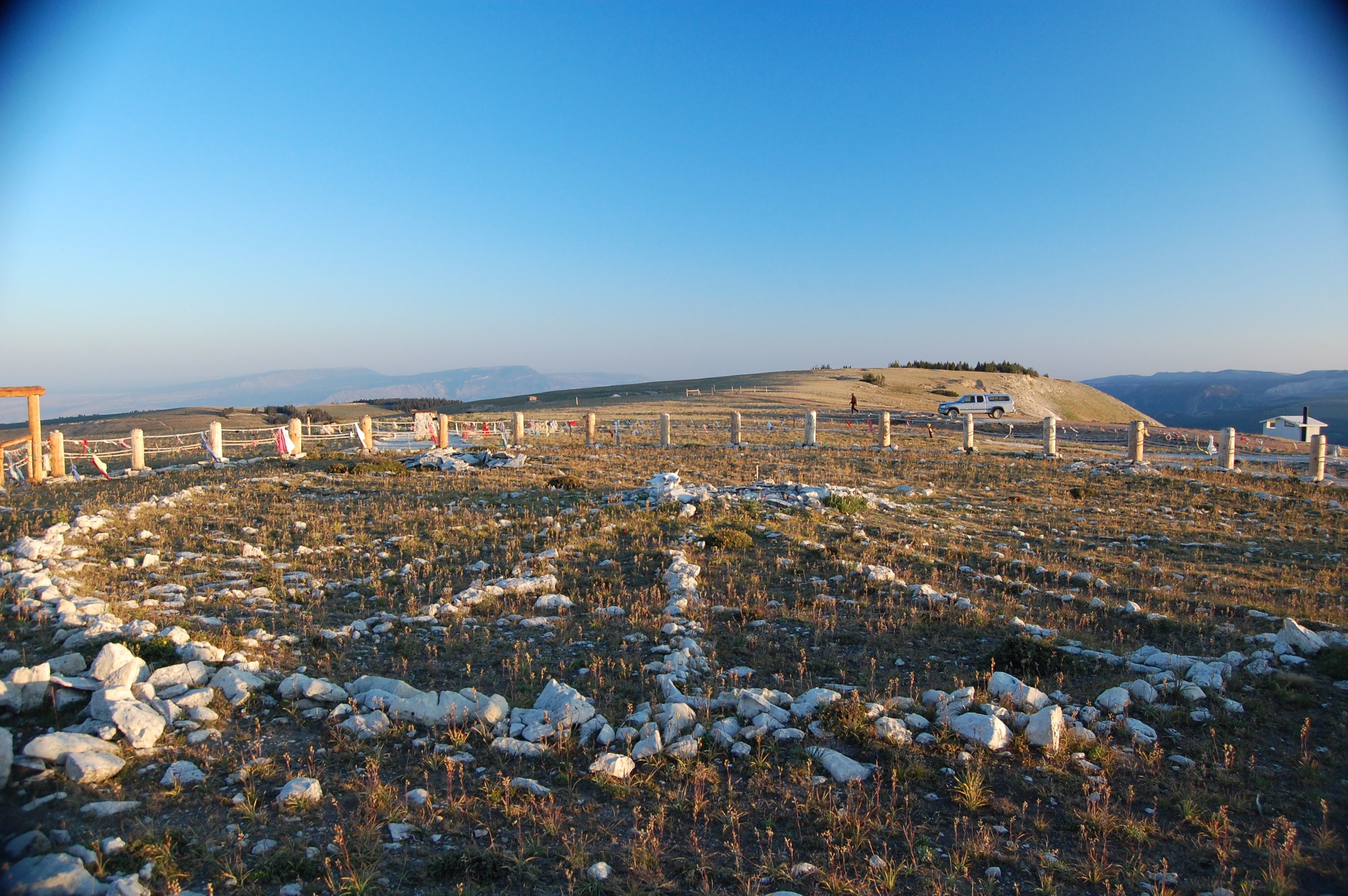
Navajo men dressed as Tó Neinilii, Tobadzischini, Nayenezgani, 1904 (top), the Medicine Wheel in Bighorn National Forest, Wyoming (middle), and the Maya El Castillo Temple in Yucatán, between the 8th and 12th centuries (bottom)

Native American religions, Native American faith, or American Indian religions are the Indigenous spiritual practices of the Indigenous peoples of the Americas. Ceremonial practices involve sacred, spiritual, cultural traditions that can differ slightly among the indigenous groups of the continent. Early European explorers describe some communities, now labelled Native American tribes in the United States and small First Nations or bands in Canada, as each having unique religious practices. The religions' theologies may be monotheistic, polytheistic, henotheistic, animistic, shamanistic, pantheistic, or any combination thereof, among others. Traditional beliefs are usually passed down in the oral tradition forms of myths, oral histories, stories, allegories, and principles. Nowadays, as scholars note, many American Natives are having a renewed interest in their own traditions.

== Overview ==
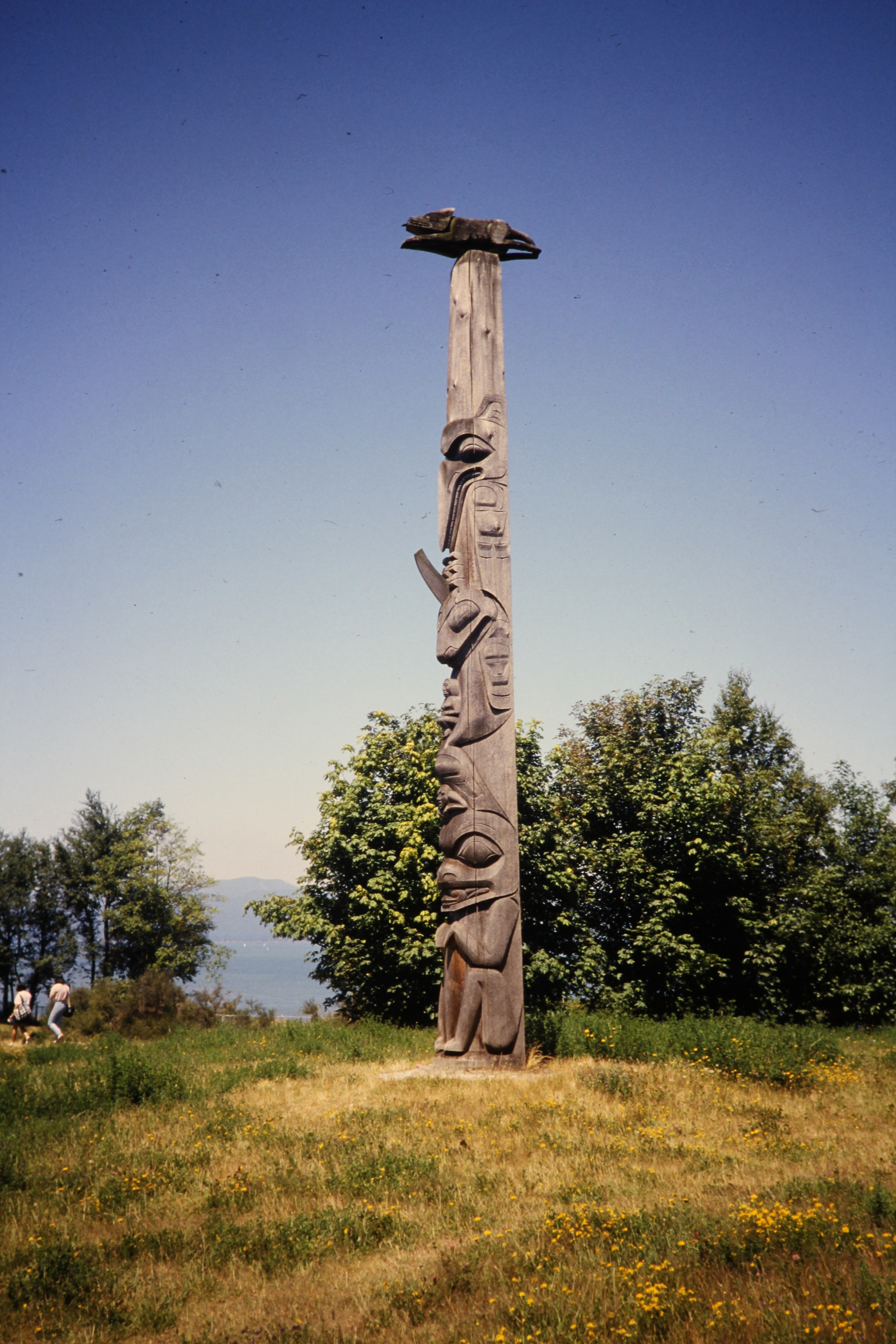
Totem pole in Vancouver.

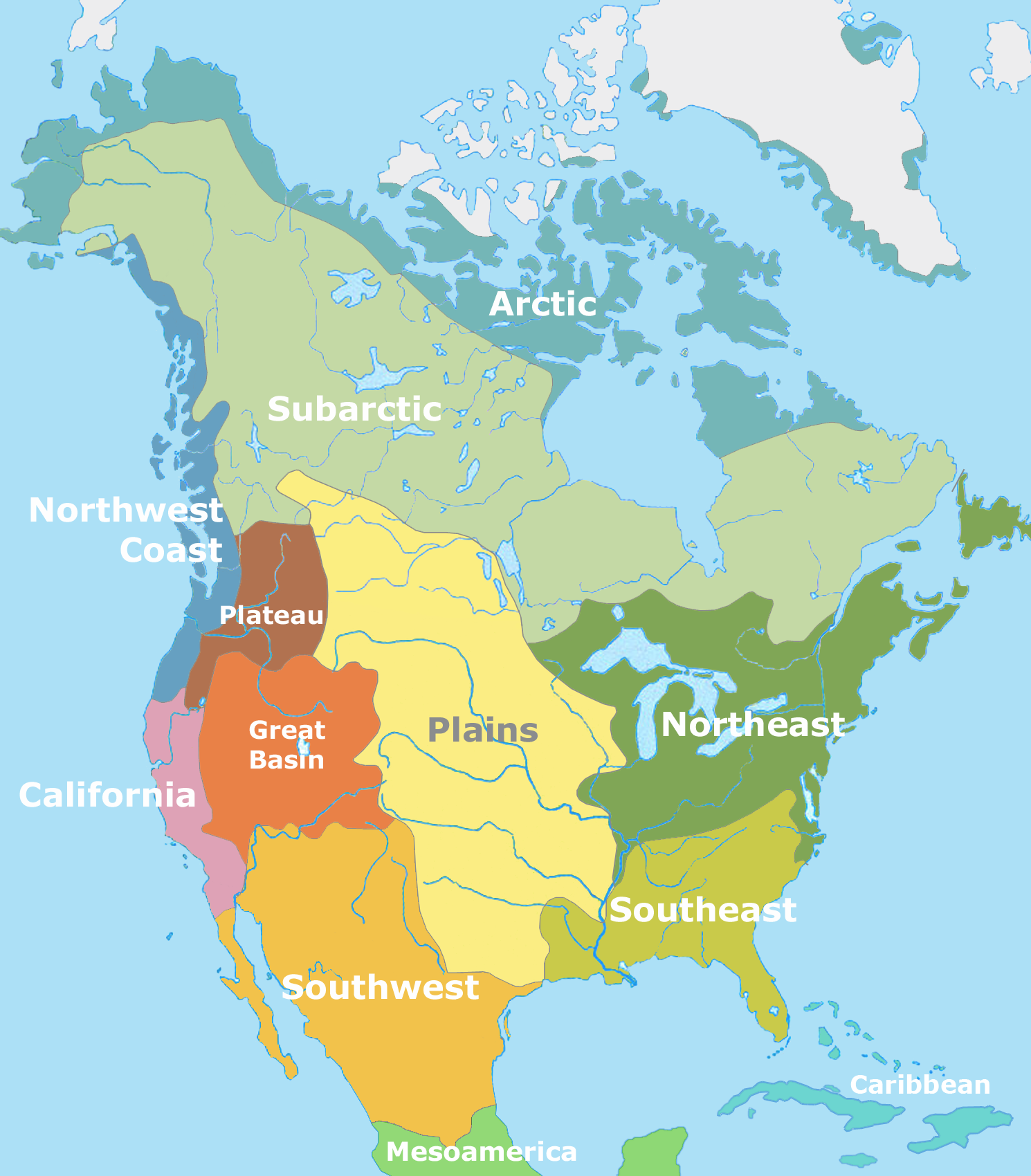
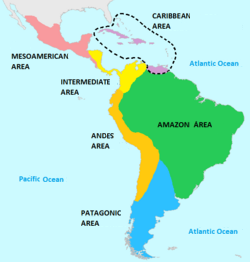
Areas of the Native Americans in the pre-Columbian era in North America (top) and Mesoamerica and South America (bottom)

Native American religions were prevalent in the pre-Columbian era and included state religions. A concept common among the religions is the existence of a supernatural world of deities, spirits and wonders, such as the Algonquian manitou (Algonquin: manitò, lit. 'spirit' or 'spiritual power') or the Lakota Wakan Tanka, (Lakota: Wakȟáŋ Tȟáŋka, lit. 'Great Sacredness'), as well as Great Spirit, Fifth World, world tree, and the red road among many Indians.

Before Christianization occurred, in most American religions, there was a supreme God, a creator or teacher, such as the Inca god Viracocha, or a sky deity (e.g., 'Great Spirit') from whom all other spiritual beings manifest or emanate (e.g., the Pawnee god Tirawa). The supreme being is closely associated with the World Tree, or world pole/pillar—the central cultic symbol in the great rites of the main regions, especially of Northern America. Other traditional pre-Modern religious rites were hunting, gathering, planting, and war ceremonies. Today, many practitioners of Native American religions do not consider religion to be a separate sphere from everyday life and include politics, law, health, education, and environmental stewardship as part of their religious life.

During the 16th–21st centuries, Native American spirituality had numerous new indigenist revitalization movements that divided to fundamentalist and reform.

Generally fundamentalist movements favoured a return to traditional ways and rejected the changes brought by the modern states; in North America they include the Pueblo Revolt (1680s), the Shawnee Prophet Movement (1805–1811), the Cherokee Prophet Movement (1811–1813), the Red Stick War (1813–1814), White Path's Rebellion (1826), the Winnebago Prophet Movement (1830–1832), the first Ghost Dance (1869–1870) and the second Ghost Dance (1889–1890), and the Snake movements among the Cherokee, Choctaw, and Muscogee Creek Indians during the 1890s.

Generally, syncretic reform movements include the Yaqui Religion (1500–present), the Longhouse Religion (1797–present), the Munsee Prophetess Movement (1804–1805), the Kickapoo Prophet Movement (1815–present), the Cherokee Keetoowah Society (1858–present), the Washat Dreamers Religion (1850–present), the Indian Shakers (1881–present), the Native American Church (1800s–present), the Shoshoni Sun Dance (1890–present), the New Tidings religion or Wocekiye of the Canadian Sioux (1900–present), and Ojibwe Drummer Movement (contemporary).

Beginning in the 1600s, European Christians, both Catholics and those of various Protestant denominations, sought to convert Native American tribes from their pre-existing beliefs to Christianity. After the United States gained independence in the late 1700s, its government continued to suppress Indigenous practices and promote forcible conversion. American and Canadian government agencies and religious organizations often cooperated in these forcible conversion efforts. In many cases, violence was used as a tool of suppression, as in the government's violent eradication of Ghost Dance and Sun Dance practitioners in the 1890s. Thus, Canada lifted its prohibition against the practice of the Sun Dance full ceremony only in 1951.

By the turn of the 20th century, the American government began to turn to less violent means of suppressing Native American religious beliefs. A series of federal laws banned traditional Indigenous practices such as feasts, Sun Dance ceremonies, and the use of the sweat lodge, among others. This government persecution and prosecution officially continued until 1978 with the passage of the American Indian Religious Freedom Act (AIRFA), although it has been argued that the AIRFA had little real effect on the protection of Native religious beliefs.

Another significant system of religious suppression was the removal of Native American children from their families into a system of government-funded and Christian church-operated American Indian boarding schools (also known as residential schools). In these schools, Native children were forced through violence and oppression to learn European Christian beliefs, the values of mainstream white culture, and the English language, while simultaneously being forbidden to speak their own languages and practice their own cultural beliefs. This system of forcible conversion and suppression of Indigenous languages and cultures continued through the 1970s.

Some non-Native anthropologists estimate membership in traditional Native American religions in the 21st century to be about 9000 people. Since Native Americans practicing traditional ceremonies do not usually have public organizations or membership rolls, these "members" estimates are likely substantially lower than the actual numbers of people who participate in traditional ceremonies. Native American spiritual leaders also note that these academic estimates substantially underestimate the numbers of participants because a century of U.S. federal government persecution and prosecutions of traditional ceremonies caused believers to practice their religions in secrecy. Many adherents of traditional spiritual ways also attend Christian services, at least some of the time, which can also affect statistics. Since the 80 years of those prior legal persecutions ended with AIRFA, some sacred sites in the United States are now protected areas under law.

== Regional and pan-Native traditions ==
=== Alaska and Far North ===
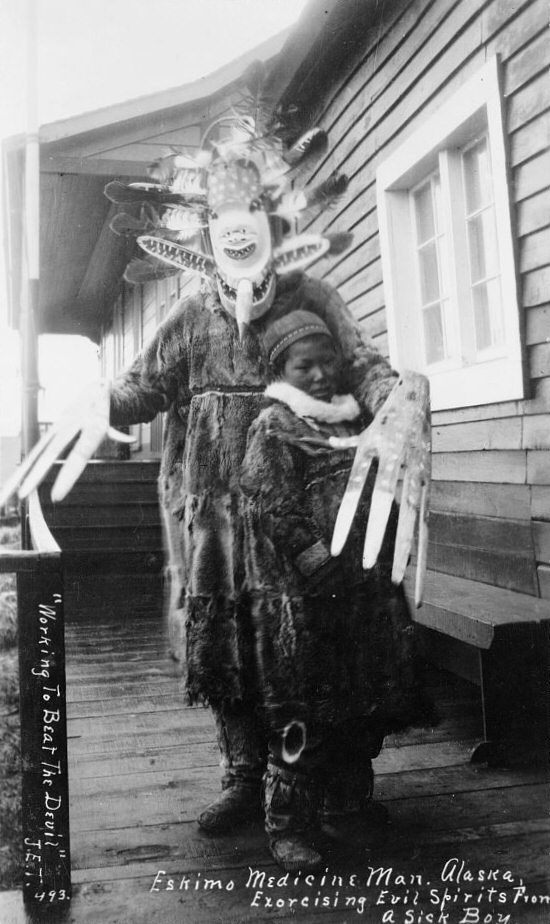
Yup'ik shaman exorcising evil spirits from a sick boy. Nushagak, Alaska, 1890s.

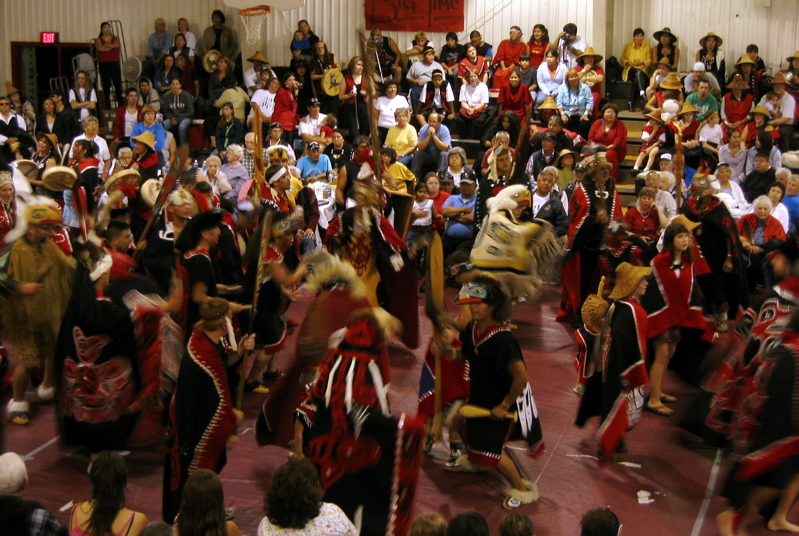
Dancing at a pole-raising celebration in Klawock, Alaska.

The living in the North American Arctic and sub-Arctic Alaska Natives and many Indigenous peoples in Canada mainly practice hunter-gatherer religious cults. Traditional Alaskan shamanism involve mediation between people and spirits, souls, and other immortal beings.

=== Western North America ===
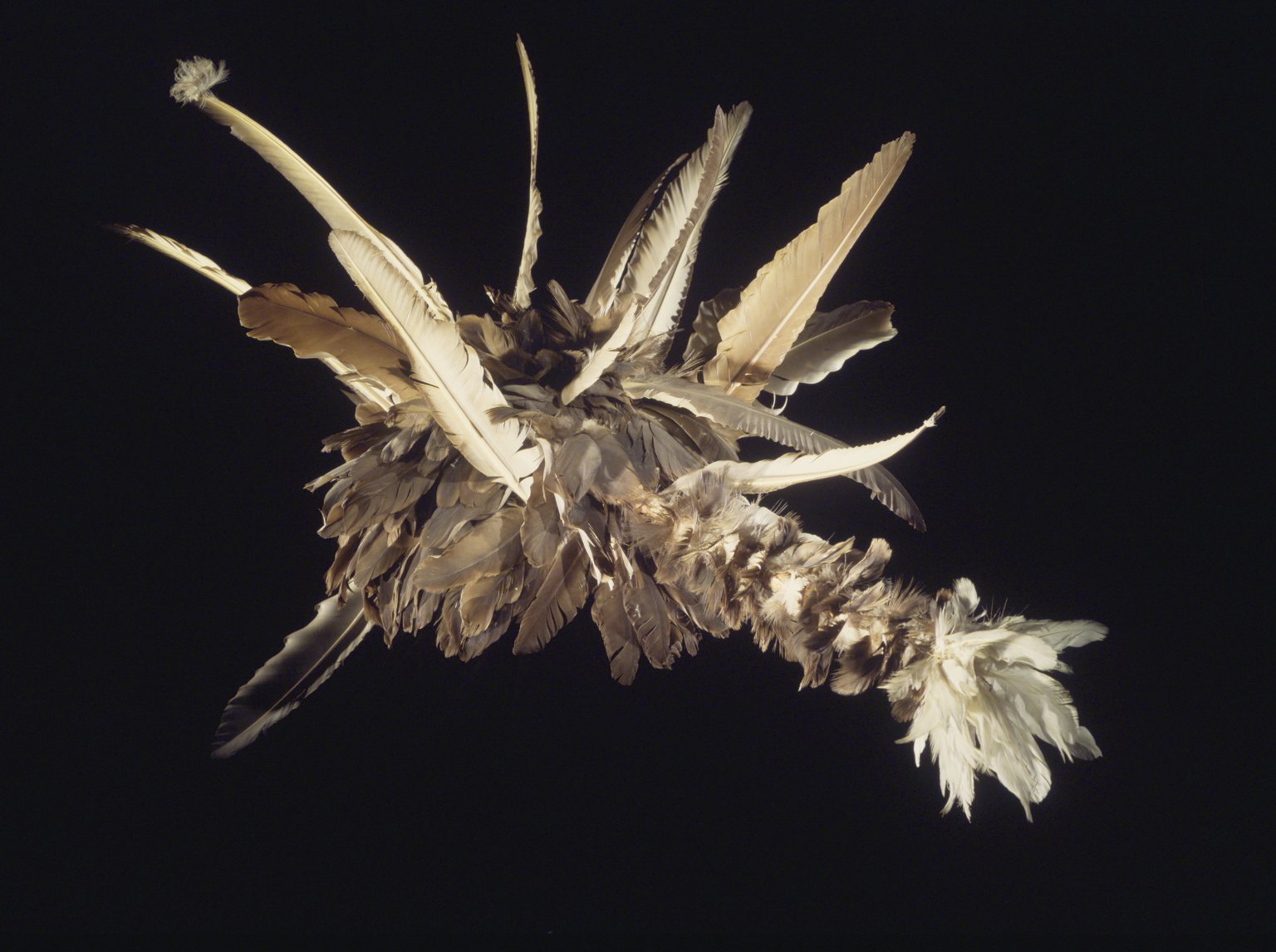
Pomo doctor's headdress

Western North America includes such cultural areas as Northwest Coast, Plateau, Great Basin, and a region of the Indigenous peoples of California.

==== Earth Lodge Religion ====
The Earth Lodge Religion was founded in northern California and southern Oregon tribes such as the Wintun. It spread to tribes such as the Achomawi, Shasta, and Siletz, to name a few. It was also known as the "Warm House Dance" among the Pomo. It predicted occurrences similar to those predicted by the Ghost Dance, such as the return of ancestors or the world's end. The Earth Lodge Religion impacted the later religious practice, the Dream Dance, belonging to the Klamath and the Modoc.

==== Washat Dreamers Religion ====
The Washat Dreamers Religion, also called the Waashat Religion/Faith, the Waasaní (Washani) Religion, Seven Drum Religion, and the Longhouse religion (separate from the Iroquois Longhouse religion) is a faith still persisting in some modern Native communities. Washani, meaning "dancers" or "worship", was a reform response to pressures from American settlers at the time for Natives to relocate or become "civilized". The Wanapum Indian Smohalla (c. 1815 – 1895) originally built the religion in 1850 in the Columbia River region of modern-day Washington, and over time it has spread across the Pacific Northwest. Smohalla claimed that he had received visions in his dreams, where he had visited the spirit world and had been sent back to teach his people. He preached a reform return to the original way of life of hunter-gatherer lifestyle as opposed to agriculturalism, before the influence of colonizers, emphasizing abstinence from alcohol and cleansing themselves of white influences. Smohalla was sometimes called Yuyunipitqana, meaning "Shouting Mountain", because it was said that his wisdom came from a mountain speaking within his soul.

The religion combined elements of Christianity with Native beliefs, teaching similar origin stories as Catholicism and holding Sunday as a holy day, while still ultimately pushing away from the so-called civilized man that white people idealized. Despite this, Smohalla rejected the Christian Puritanical ideal of a strong work ethic and plowing the land. Two notable quotes of Smohalla's "You ask me to plough the ground! Shall I take a knife and tear my mother's bosom?" and "My young men shall never work. Men who work can not dream, and wisdom comes to us in dreams," demonstrates these tenets. The Native-inspired elements of the religion involved the Waashat Dance, a dance which involves seven drummers, a salmon feast, use of eagle and swan feathers and a sacred song sung every seventh day.

The Dreamer Faith foreshadowed the later Ghost Dances of the plains peoples, another religion which sought to rid Natives of white people and their influences through peaceful religion. These kinds of religions made it difficult to assimilate or control the tribes by the United States, as the U.S. was trying to convert the Plains tribes from hunter-gatherers to farmers; farming was believed to be more civilized and a better use of the land. They wanted to remake the Natives, but found a problem with those who followed the Waashat Religion: "Their model of a man is an Indian; They aspire to be Indian and nothing else." (T. B. Odeneal) Smohalla was eventually jailed in an effort to quell a potential uprising of Native peoples, but his religion has continued to survive without him.

==== Indian Shaker Church ====
Also known as Tschida, the Indian Shaker Church was influenced by the Waashat Religion and founded by John Slocum, a Squaxin Island member. The name comes from the shaking and twitching motions used by the participants to brush off their sins. The religion combines Christianity with traditional Indian teachings.

=== Great Plains ===
The Great Plains is home to religious traditions of more than fifty Plains Indians nations that are some of the most varied and complex in Northern America.

==== Ghost Dance ====
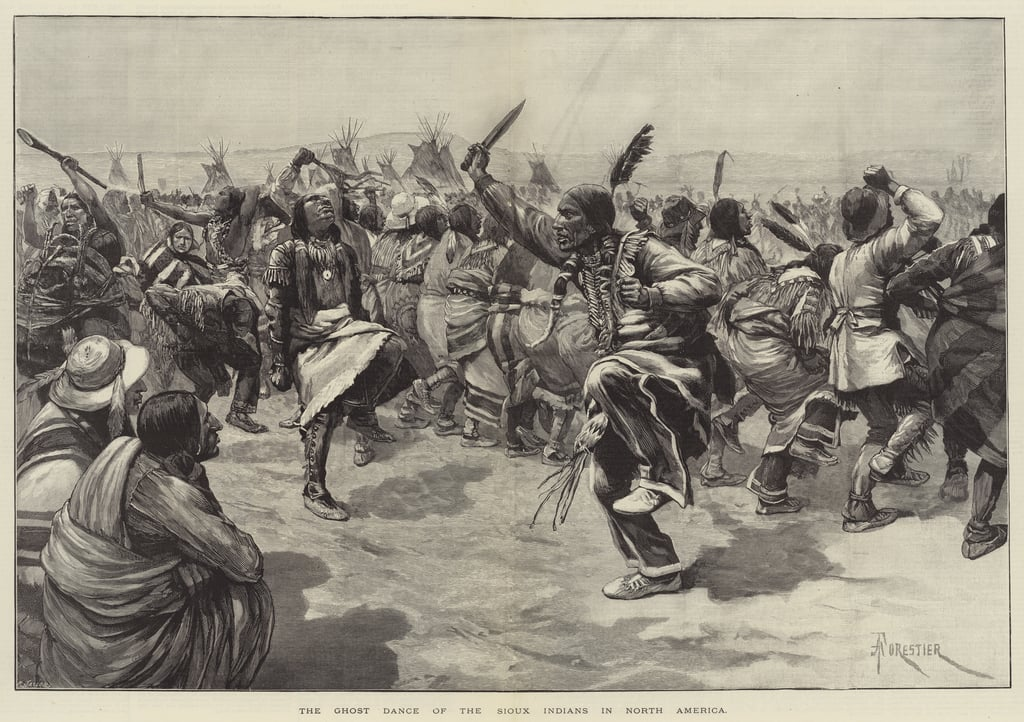
1891 Sioux Ghost Dance. The Ghost Dance movement influenced many Native American communities.

The Ghost Dance movement of the late 1800s was a religious revitalization movement in the Western United States. Initially founded as a local ceremony in Nevada, by the Paiute prophet Wodziwob, the movement did not gain widespread popularity until 1889–1890, when the Ghost Dance Religion was founded by Wovoka (Jack Wilson), who was also Northern Paiute. The Ghost Dance was created in a time of genocide, to save the lives of the Native Americans by enabling them to survive the current and coming catastrophes, by calling the dead to fight on their behalf, and to help them drive the colonists out of their lands.

In December 1888, Wovoka, who was thought to be the son of the medicine man Tavibo (Numu-tibo'o), fell sick with a fever during an eclipse of the sun, which occurred on January 1, 1889. Upon his recovery, he claimed that he had visited the spirit world and the Supreme Being and predicted that the world would soon end, then be restored to a pure state in the presence of the Messiah. All Native Americans would inherit this world, including those who were already dead, in order to live eternally without suffering. In order to reach this reality, Wovoka stated that all Native Americans should live honestly, and shun the ways of whites (especially the consumption of alcohol). He called for meditation, prayer, singing, and dancing as an alternative to mourning the dead, for they would soon resurrect. Wovoka's followers saw him as a form of the messiah and he became known as the "Red Man's Christ."

Tavibo had participated in the Ghost Dance of 1870 and had a similar vision of the Great Spirit of Earth removing all white men, and then of an earthquake removing all human beings. Tavibo's vision concluded that Native Americans would return to live in a restored environment and that only believers in his revelations would be resurrected.

This religion spread to many tribes on reservations in the West, including the Shoshone, Arapaho, Cheyenne, and Sioux (Dakota, Lakota, and Nakota). In fact, some bands of Lakota and Dakota were so desperate for hope during this period of forced relocation and genocide that, after making a pilgrimage to the Nevada Ghost Dance in 1889–1890, they became more militant in their resistance to the white colonists. Each Nation that adopted the Ghost Dance way provided their own understanding to the ceremony, which included the prediction that the white people would disappear, die, or be driven back across the sea. A Ghost Dance gathering at Wounded Knee in December 1890 was invaded by the Seventh Cavalry, who massacred unarmed Lakota and Dakota people, primarily women, children and the elderly.

The earliest Ghost Dance heavily influenced religions such as the Earth Lodge, Bole-Maru Religion, and the Dream Dance. The Caddo Nation and several other communities still practice the Ghost Dance today, though usually in secret.

==== Wocekiye ====
Wocekiye is a faith and practice among Dakota and Lakota peoples engaged in both the traditional Dakota and Lakota religion as well as forms of Christianity.

=== North-Eastern America ===
The most prominent tribes of the Northeast Woodlands in the US and Canada are Algonquin, Iroquoian and Siouan-speaking peoples.

==== Hudson Bay Interior/Subarctic ====
The Cree, including Omushkego, beliefs similar to Anishinaabe traditional beliefs, different structure.

==== Great Lakes Region ====
Midewiwin or the Grand Medicine Society and Wabunowin or the Dawn Society are a traditional religious organisations of the Anishinaabe (Ojibwe) and some others of the Natives of the Maritimes, New England and Great Lakes regions.

==== Longhouse Religion ====
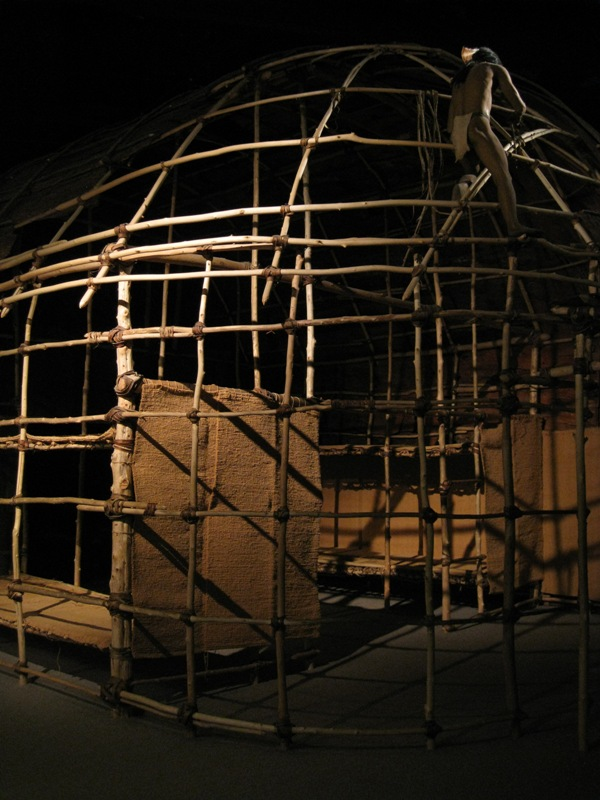
This replica of a Six Nations (Haudenosaunee) longhouse represents where the traditional practices take place.

The Longhouse Religion is the popular name of the religious movement known as The Code of Handsome Lake or Gaihwi:io ("Good Message"), founded in 1797/1799 by the Seneca prophet Handsome Lake (Sganyodaiyo^{ʔ}). He combines and reinterprets elements of traditional Seneca beliefs with a revised code such as must refrain from drinking, selling of land, intensive animal farming and witchcraft meant to revive traditional consciousness after a long period of cultural disintegration following colonization.

=== South-Eastern North America ===
The native religions of the U.S. region are held in common among the Indigenous peoples of the Southeastern Woodlands, who mainly practiced the Green Corn Ceremony and other agriculture cults.

==== Keetoowah Society ====
The Cherokee Keetoowah Society is a reform religious and political organisation formed in 1858 and re-established ca. 1900 that intended to preserve and practice traditional Cherokee spiritual beliefs or "old ways" of tribal life, based on religious nationalism.

==== Four Mothers Society ====
The Four Mothers Society is a religious in nature traditionalist organisation of Muscogee, Cherokee, Choctaw and Chickasaw peoples that formally founded about 1895 and remains active today.

=== South-Western North America ===
The native nations of the Southwestern U.S. and Mexico mainly practiced maize and other agriculture cults.

==== Mexicayotl ====
Mexicayotl (Nahuatl word meaning "Essence of the Mexican", "Mexicanity"; Spanish: Mexicanidad; see -yotl) is a movement reviving the Indigenous religion, philosophy and traditions of ancient Mexico (Aztec religion and Aztec philosophy) amongst the Indigenous peoples of Mexico.

The movement came to light in the 1950s, led by Mexico City intellectuals, but has grown significantly on a grassroots level only in more recent times, also spreading to the Chicanos of North America. Their rituals involve the mitotiliztli. The followers, called Mexicatl (singular) and Mexicah (plural), or simply Mexica, are mostly urban and suburban people.

The Mexicayotl movement started in the 1950s with the founding of the group Nueva Mexicanidad by Antonio Velasco Piña. In the same years, Rodolfo Nieva López founded the Movimiento Confederado Restaurador de la Cultura del Anáhuac, the co-founder of which was Francisco Jimenez Sanchez who in later decades became a spiritual leader of the Mexicayotl movement, endowed with the honorific Tlacaelel. He had a deep influence in shaping the movement, founding the In Kaltonal ("House of the Sun", also called Native Mexican Church) in the 1970s.

From the 1970s onwards Mexcayotl has grown developing in a web of local worship and community groups (called calpulli or kalpulli) and spreading to the Mexican Americans or Chicanos in the United States. It has also developed strong ties with Mexican national identity movements and Chicano nationalism. Sanchez's Native Mexican Church (which is a confederation of calpullis) was officially recognized by the government of Mexico in 2007.

=== Mesoamerica ===
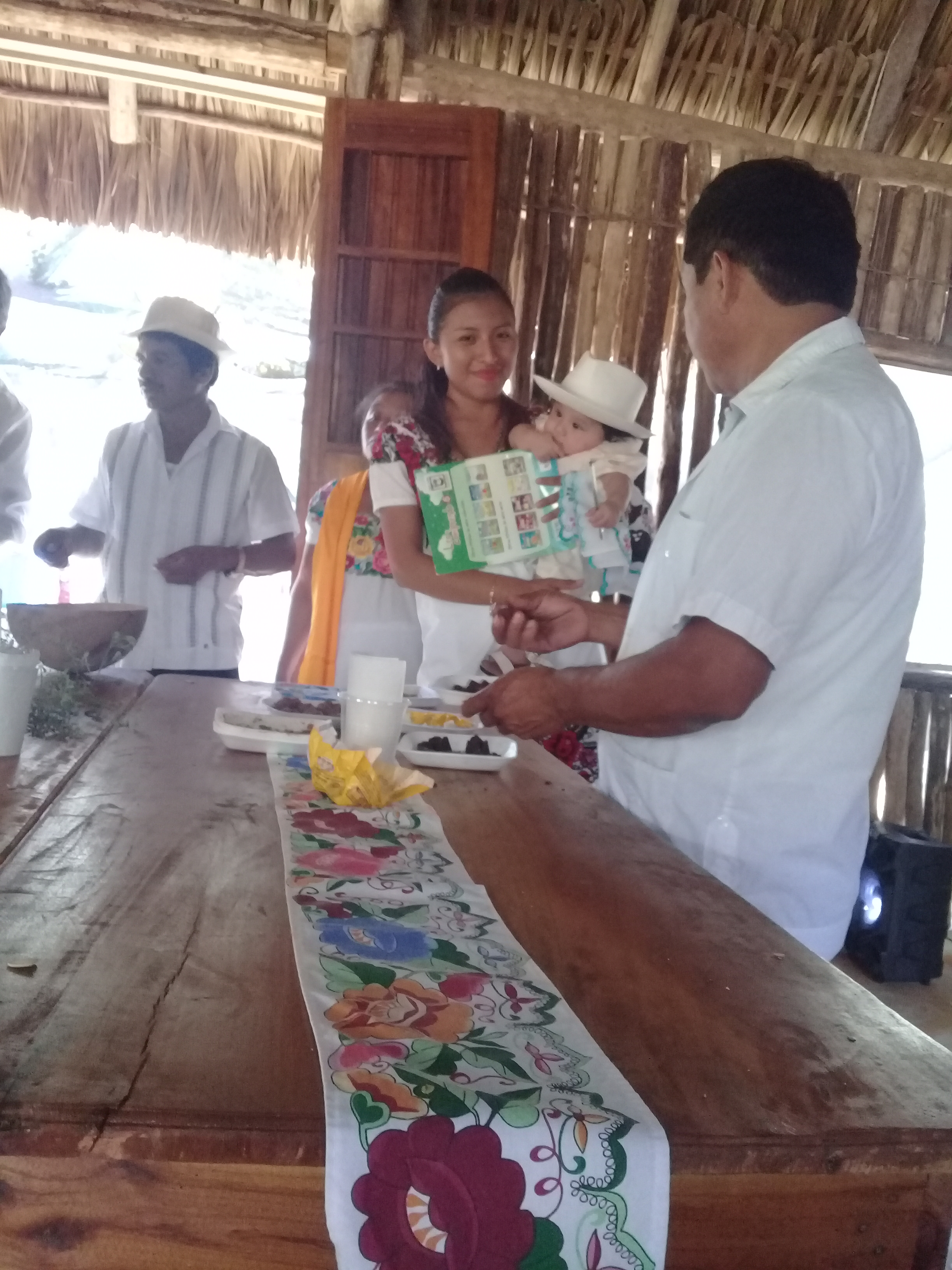
The Yucatec Maya celebrate jéets méek, or "second birth" – a rite of passage marking a child's transition from the cradle to their mother's hip.

Two of the most widely known examples of faith of the Indigenous peoples of Mesoamerica are the Aztec and Maya state religions sponsored the monism of the upper classes.

=== South America ===
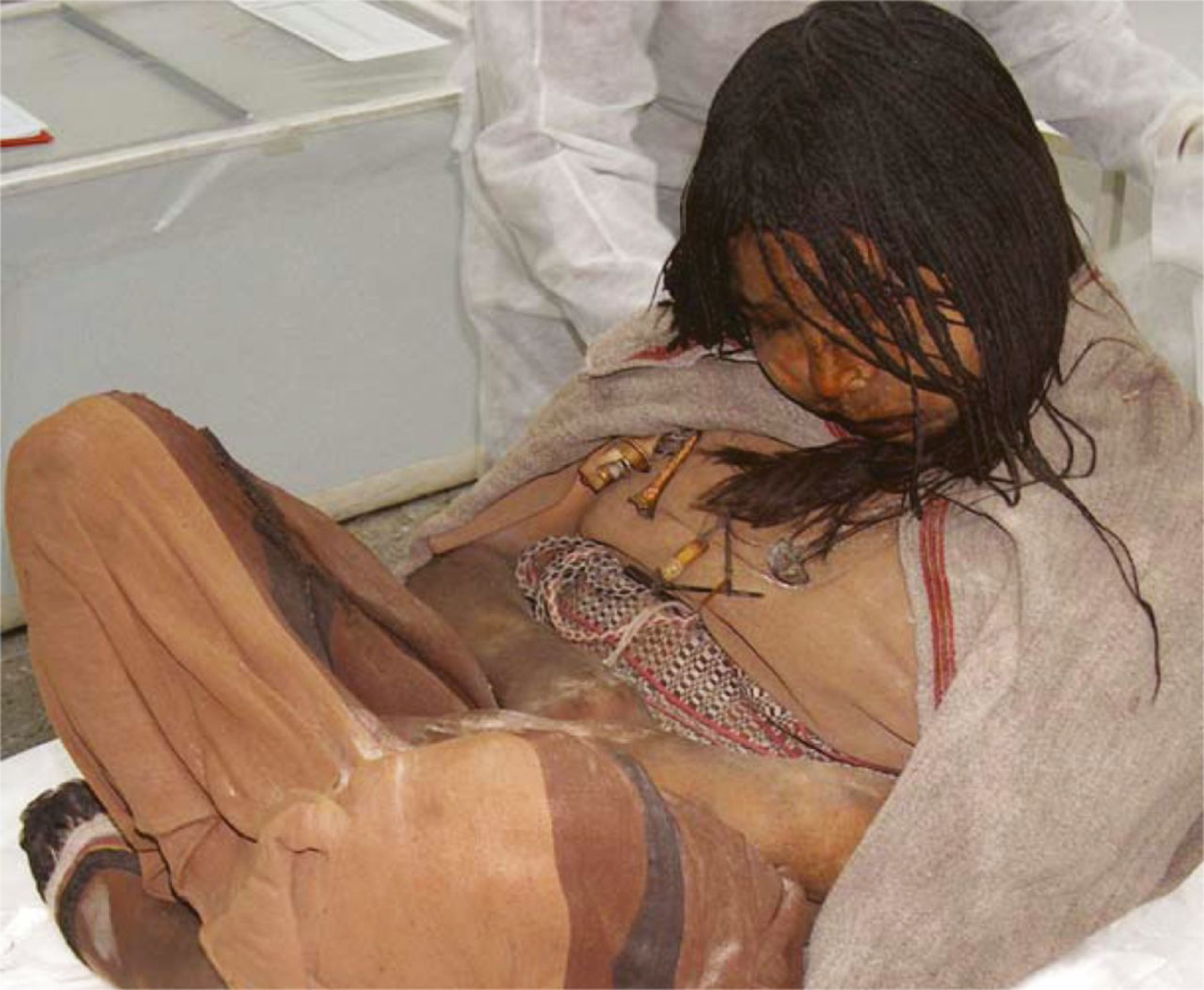
"The Maiden", one of the children of Llullaillaco mummies for the Inca ritual Capacocha—a preserved human sacrifice in pre-Columbian cultures c. 1500.

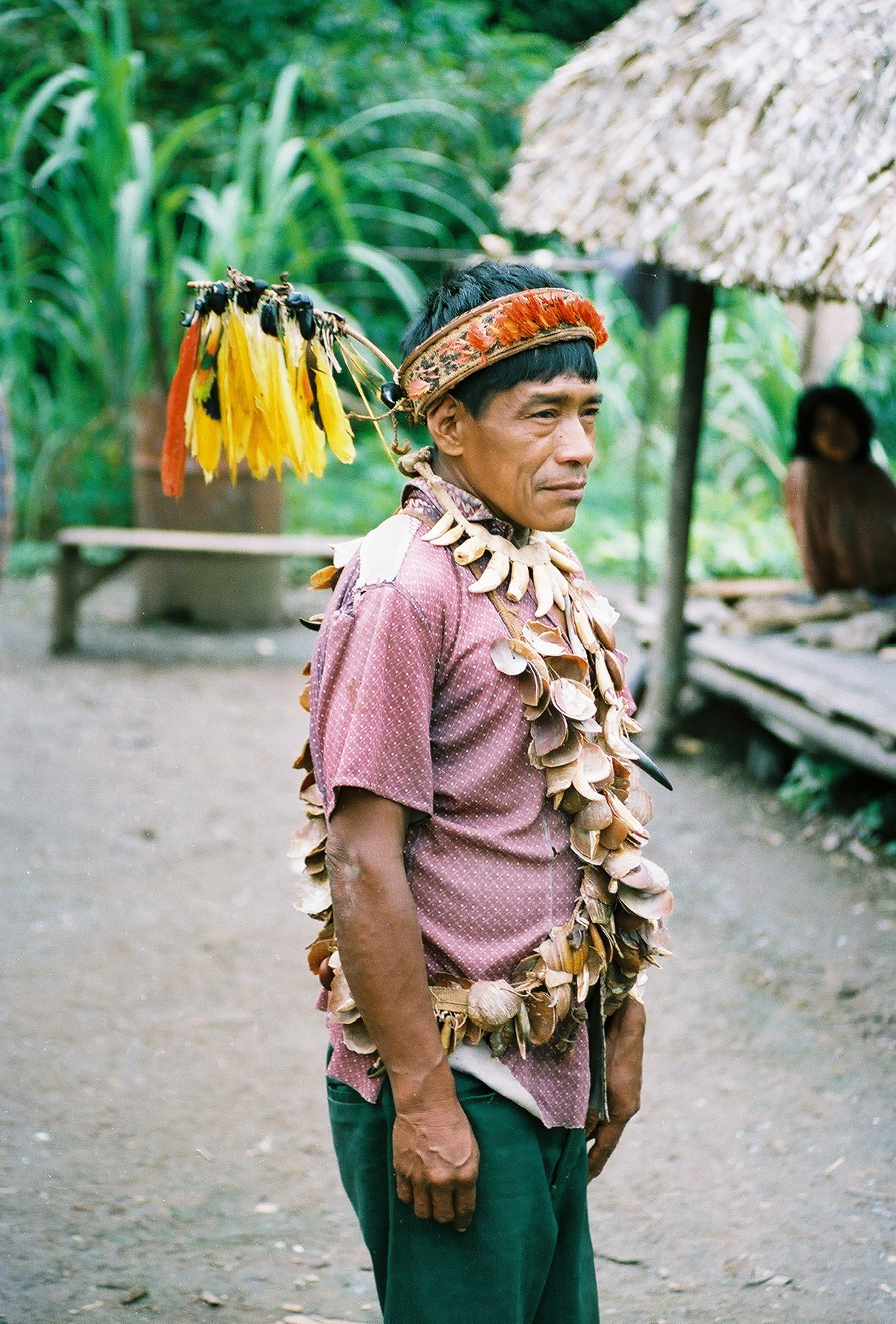
Urarina shaman, Peru

Religious traditions of the Indigenous peoples of South America from different regions are very varied. The most outstanding contrast appears between the highly developed Andean faiths with priesthood and empire-ruling cults and the religious beliefs of the tribes in the eastern lowlands. Caral–Supe civilization in Peru has been recognized as one of the cradles of civilization and oldest-known civilization in the Americas.

An example of modern syncretistic events is the dance and parade Diablada ("Dance of the Devils") which traditionally honored the Indigenous Uru terrible god Tiw.

=== Pan-Native traditions and ceremonies ===
Especially among native North Americans, can be found several pan-Native ceremonies and traditions, both all-North American, such as powwow meetings, and regional, like the Sun Dance.

==== Native American Church ====
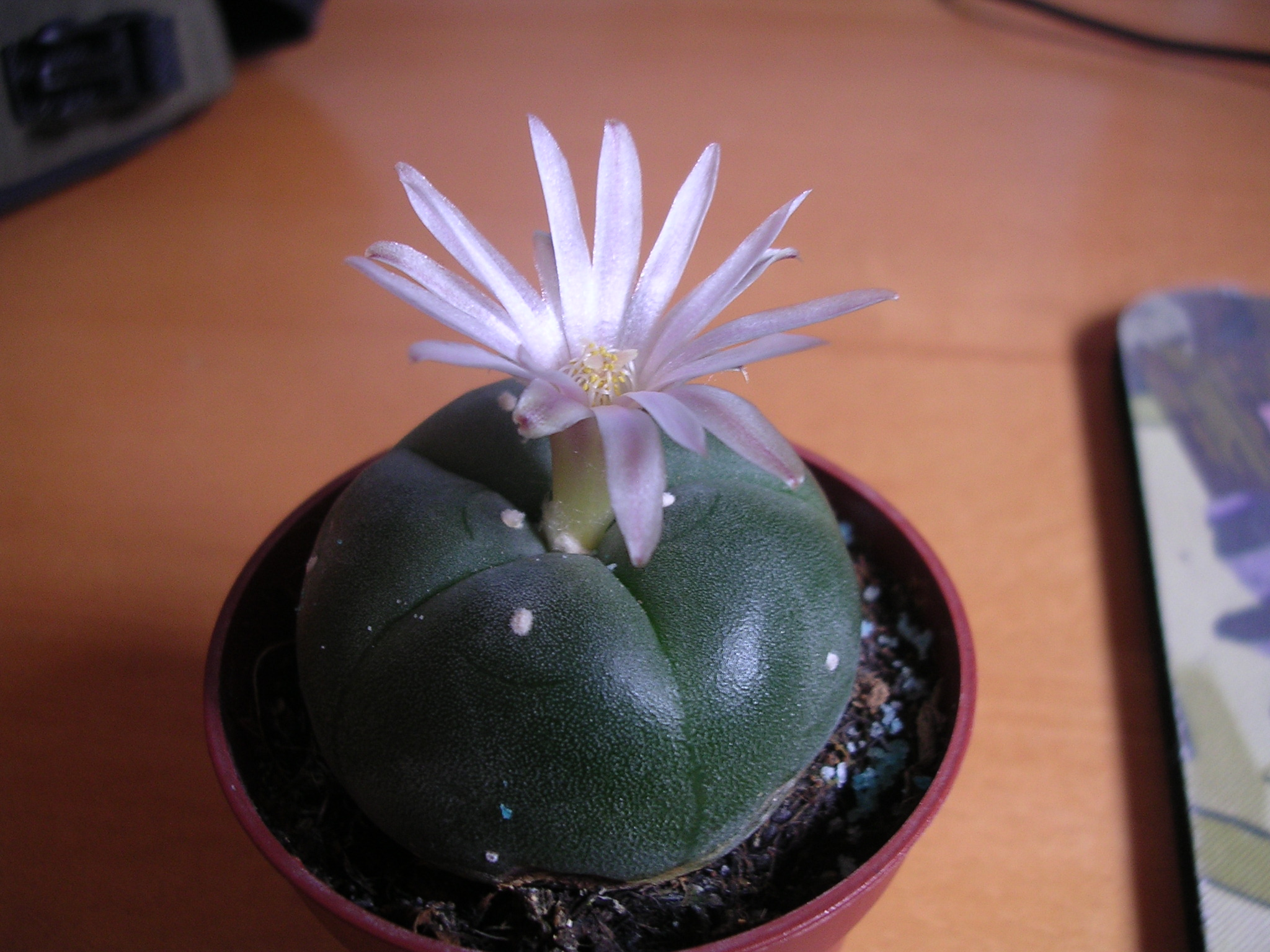
A flowering peyote cactus.

The Peyote Religion (legally termed and more properly known as the Native American Church), also sometimes called the "Peyote Road" or the "Peyote Way", is a reformed religious tradition involving the ceremonial and sacred use of Lophophora williamsii (peyote). Use of peyote for religious purposes is thousands of years old and some have thought it to have originated within one of the following tribes: the Carrizo, the Coahuiltecan, the Lipan Apache, the Mescalero Apache, the Karankawa, or the Caddo, the Navajo, the Tonkawa, with the Plains Cree, Carrizo, and the Lipan Apache being the three most likely sources. In Mexico the Huichol, Tepehuán, and other Native Mexicans use peyote.

==== Sun Dance ====
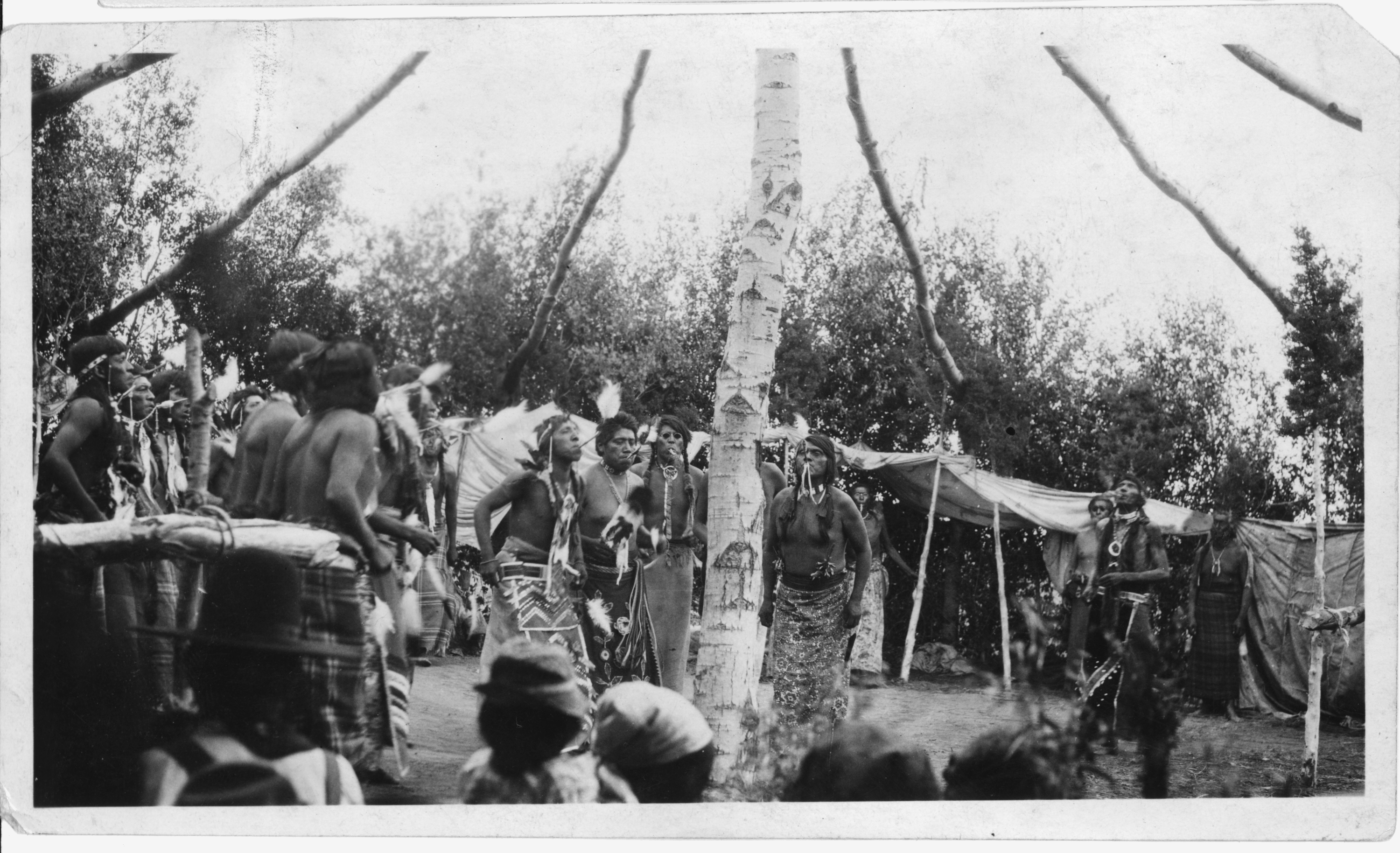
Shoshone Sun Dance at Fort Hall, 1925.

The Sun Dance is a religious ceremony and reform movement, 1890 the Shoshone tribe in origin, practiced by a number of Native American peoples in the U.S. and Canada, primarily those of the Plains Nations. Each tribe that has some type of sun dance ceremony that has their own distinct practices and ceremonial protocols. In many cases, the ceremony is held in private and is not open to the public. Most details of the ceremony are kept from public knowledge out of great respect for, and the desire for protection of, the traditional ways. Many of the ceremonies have features in common, such as specific dances and songs, the use of drums, the ceremonial pipe, praying, fasting and, in some cases, the piercing of the skin as a sacrifice.

In Canada, the Plains Cree call this ceremony the Thirst Dance; the Saulteaux call it the Rain Dance; and the Blackfoot (Siksika, Kainai, and Piikani) call it the Medicine Dance. It is also practiced by the Canadian Dakota and Nakoda, and the Dene.

==== Green Corn Ceremony ====
The Green Corn Ceremony is an annual ceremony practiced among various Native American peoples associated with the beginning of the yearly corn harvest.

== Religious leaders ==
Leaders in Native religions include Popé, who led the Pueblo revolt in 1675, Quautlatas, who inspired the Tepehuan Revolt against the Spanish in 1616, Neolin, Tenskwatawa, Kenekuk, Smohalla, John Slocum, Wovoka, Black Elk and many others.

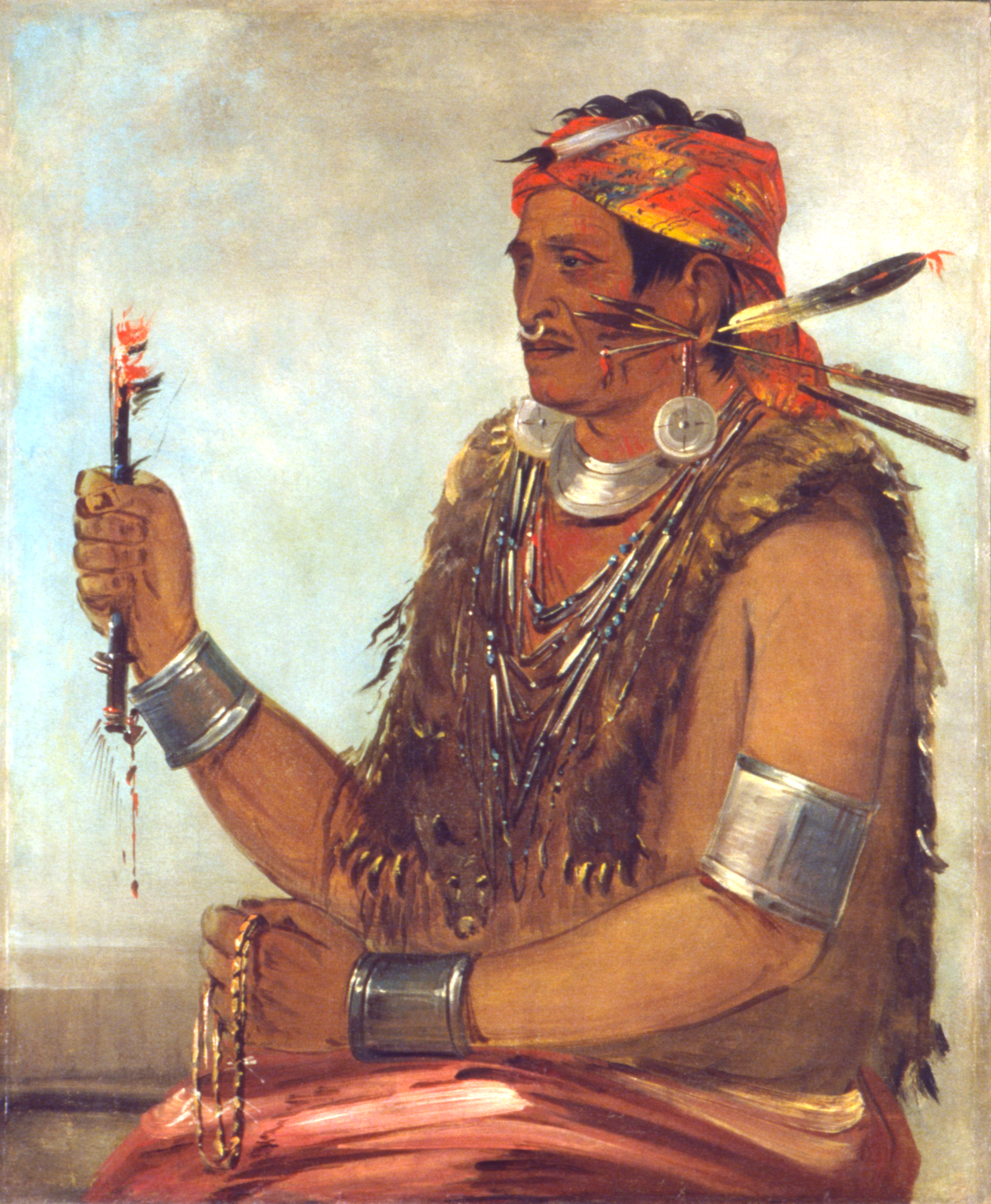
Tenskwatawa, by George Catlin.

From time to time important religious leaders organized revivals. In Indiana in 1805, Tenskwatawa (called the Shawnee Prophet by Americans) led a religious revival following a smallpox epidemic and a series of witch-hunts. His beliefs were based on the earlier teachings of the Lenape prophets, Scattamek and Neolin, who predicted a coming apocalypse that would destroy the European-American settlers. Tenskwatawa urged the tribes to reject the ways of the Americans: to give up firearms, liquor, American style clothing, to pay traders only half the value of their debts, and to refrain from ceding any more lands to the United States. The revival led to warfare led by his brother Tecumseh against the white settlers. Juan de la Cruz Puc became seen as a prophet between the Yucatec Maya during the Caste War. Juan's sermons and prophecies were preserved in the A'almaj T'aan (Cruzo'ob Bible) and are still relevant between the Yucatec Maya people.

== Congressional legislation ==
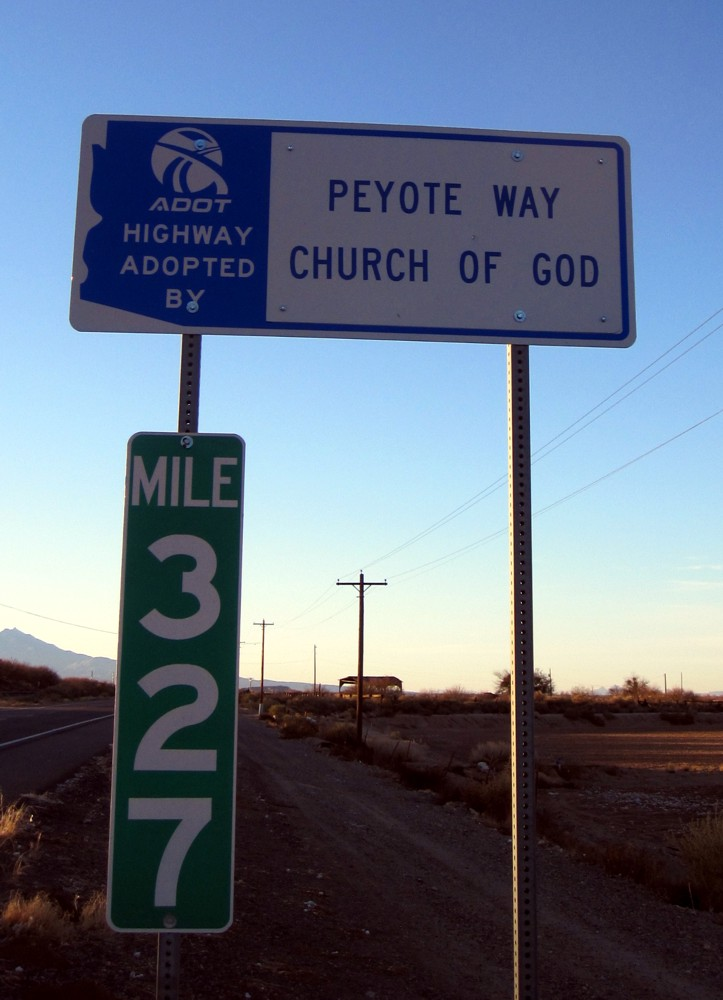
Sign for a Native American church

=== American Indian Religious Freedom Act ===
The American Indian Religious Freedom Act is a United States federal law and a joint resolution of Congress that provides protection for tribal culture and traditional religious rights such as access to sacred sites, freedom to worship through traditional ceremony, and use and possession of sacred objects for Native Americans, Inuit, Aleut, and Native Hawaiians. It was passed on August 11, 1978.

=== Native American Graves Protection and Repatriation Act ===
The Native American Graves Protection and Repatriation Act (NAGPRA), Pub.L. 101–601, 104 Stat. 3048, is a United States federal law passed on 16 November 1990 requiring federal agencies and institutions that receive federal funding to return Native American cultural items and human remains to their respective peoples. Cultural items include funerary objects, sacred objects, and objects of cultural patrimony.

=== Religious Freedom Restoration Act ===
The Religious Freedom Restoration Act of 1993 (also known as RFRA), is a 1993 United States federal law aimed at preventing laws that substantially burden a person's free exercise of religion. It was held unconstitutional as applied to the states in the City of Boerne v. Flores decision in 1997, which ruled that the RFRA is not a proper exercise of Congress's enforcement power. However, it continues to be applied to the federal government – for instance, in Gonzales v. O Centro Espirita Beneficente Uniao do Vegetal – because Congress has broad authority to carve out exemptions from federal laws and regulations that it itself has authorized. In response to City of Boerne v. Flores, some individual states passed State Religious Freedom Restoration Acts that apply to state governments and local municipalities.

=== Declaration on the Rights of Indigenous Peoples ===
The United Nations Declaration on the Rights of Indigenous Peoples was adopted by the United Nations General Assembly during its 61st session at UN Headquarters in New York City on 13 September 2007. Article 31, in particular, emphasizes that Indigenous Peoples have the right to their cultural heritage, including ceremonial knowledge, as protected intellectual property.

=== Sacred sites ===
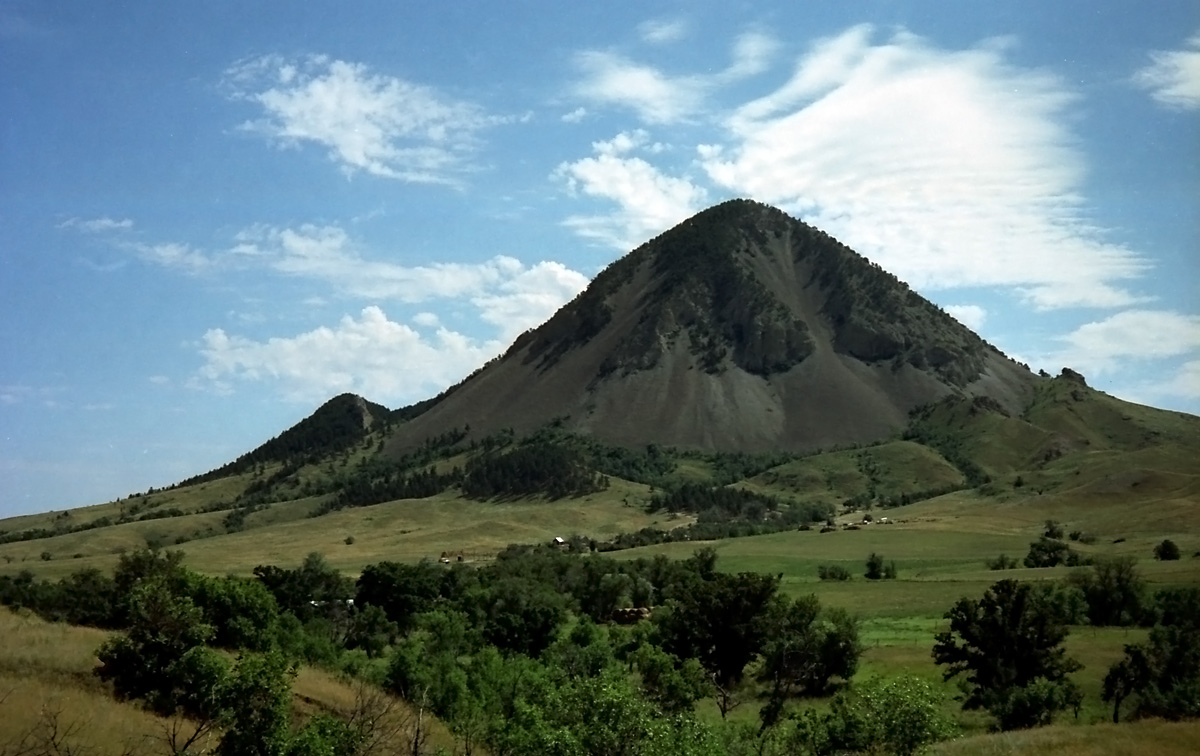
Bear Butte, in South Dakota, is a sacred site for over 30 Plains tribes.

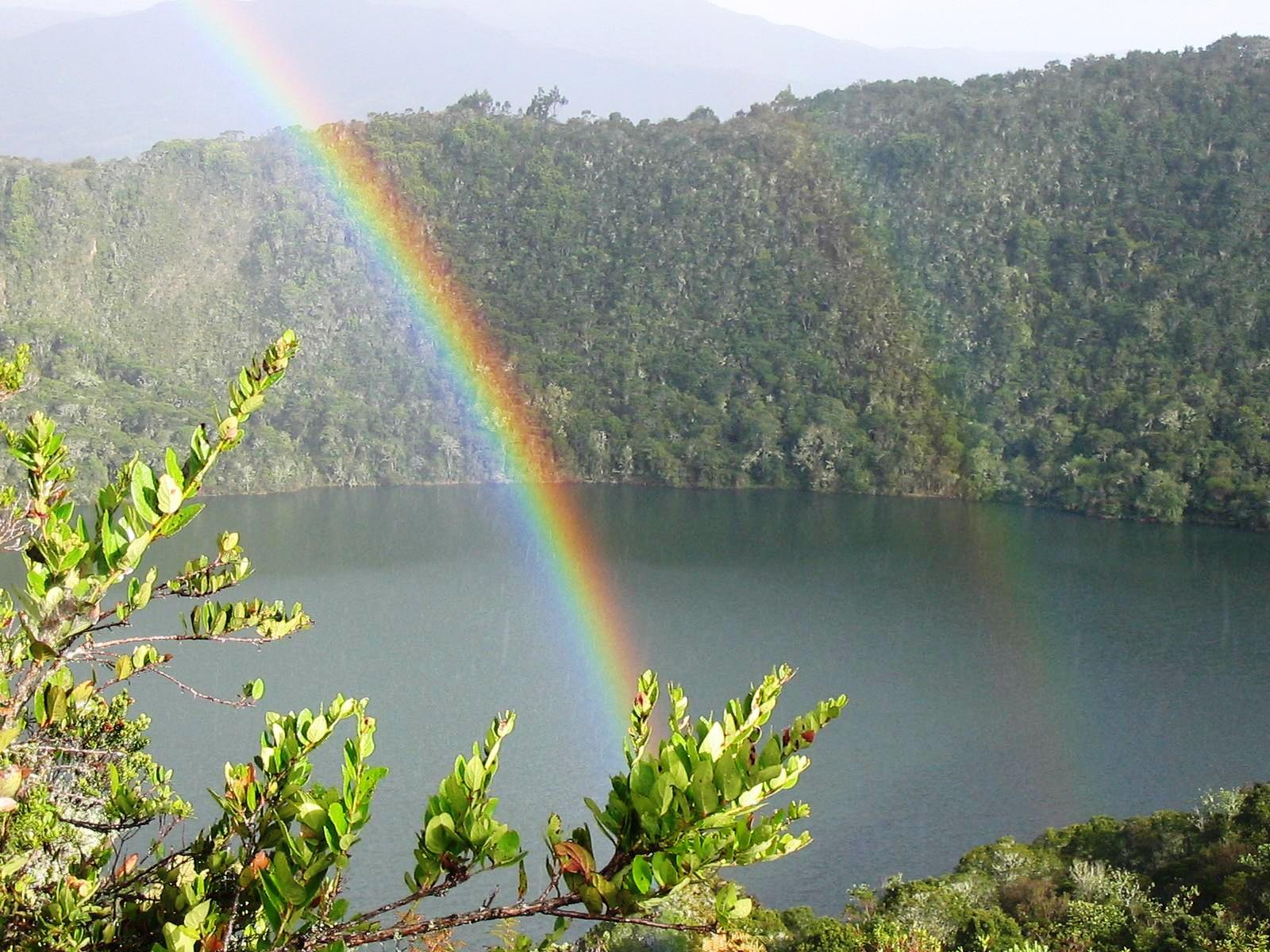
Cuchavira at sacred Lake Guatavita, Colombia.

The Native Sacred sites could be described as "specific, discrete, narrowly delineated location on Federal land that is identified by an Indian tribe, or Indian individual determined to be an appropriately authoritative representative of an Indian religion, as sacred by virtue of its established religious significance to, or ceremonial use by, an Indian religion".

== Among non-Natives ==
Among non-American Native modern pagans in a number of countries, there is a loosely formed movement called Indianism or Powwow. If in Pan-American countries, non-Natives by origin can somehow join authentic ceremonies and, at least, can revitalize same components in their own traditions, then in other parts of the world, such as Russia, neo-pagans are uniting into their own new religious movement. Its adherents, based on romanticized ideas drawn from classic adventure literature and other sources, strive to follow the worldview and way of life of American Natives. Each participant personally chooses a favorite tribe, takes a new spiritual name, and rallies (powwow) are organized in summer country camps.

In addition, there is Neoshamanism, a broad universalist new religious movement, which based on some practices derived from Native American shamanisms and associated with teachings and organisations of Carlos Castaneda and Michael Harner in the United States and Mestre Irineu and Mestre Gabriel in Brazil.

== List of religions ==
- Abenaki religion
- Ache religion
- Akawaio religion
- Alaska Native religions
  - Alaskan shamanism
  - Inuit religion
  - Tanana shamanism
  - Yupik shamanism
    - Yuit shamanism
    - Sirenik shamanism
- Andoque religion
- Anishinaabe religion
  - Ojibwe religion
  - Midewiwin
  - Wabunowin
- Apache religion
- Arhuaco religion
- Atacama religion
- Blackfoot religion
- Bororo totemism
- Caddo religion
- Californian religions
  - Achomawi religion
  - Acjachemen religion
  - Cahuilla religion
  - Hupa religion
  - Kuksu
    - Cahto religion
    - Esselen religion
    - Miwok religion
    - Ohlone religion
    - Pomo religion
  - Kumeyaay religion
  - Northern Paiute religion
  - Mohave religion
  - Wiyot religion
- Calusa religion
- Chaná religion
- Chilote religion
- Choctaw religion
- Croatan religion
- Crow religion
- Fuegian religion
  - Selk'nam religion
- Garifuna religion
- Guarani religion
- Guarayos religion
- Guayupe religion
- Gwich'in religion
- Haida religion
- Ho-Chunk religion
- Huaorani religion
- Hupda cosmgony
- Inca religion
  - Aymara religion
  - Chauvin religion
  - Nazca religion
  - Taki Unquy
  - Wari' religion
- Illinois religion
- Innu religion
- Iroquoian religions
  - Cherokee religion
    - Four Mothers Society
    - Keetoowah Society
  - Haudenosaunee religion
    - Mohawk religion
    - Onondaga religion
    - Seneca religion
  - Muscogee religion
  - Wendat religion
  - Wyandot religion
- Jivaroan religion
  - Achuar religion
  - Aguaruna religion
  - Shuar shamanism
- Karankawa religion
- Kayabi religion
- Kalapalo religion
- Kalinago religion
- Kichwa religion
- Kogi religion
- Kuikoro religion
- Kwakwakaʼwakw religion
- Lenape religion
- Lokono religion
- Maleku religion
- Mandan religion
- Mapuche religion
- Marajoara religion
- Matses religion
- Mesoamerican religions
  - Aztec religion
  - Classical Veracruz religion
  - Cora religion
  - Huichol religion
  - Lencan religion
  - Maya religion
    - Chuj religion
    - Cult of The Talking Cross
    - Huastec religion
    - Lacandon religion
    - Mazatec religion
    - Maximon
    - Mopan religion
    - Pech cosmogony
    - Q'eqchi' religion
    - Tzeltal religion
    - Tzotzil religion
    - Tzʼutujil religion
  - Mixe religion
  - Nagualism
  - Olmec religion
  - Purépecha religion
  - Talamancan religion
  - Teotihuacan religion
  - Tepehuan religion
  - Tlapanec religion
  - Totonac religion
  - Zapotec religion
- Mi'kmaq religion
- Old Miskito religion
- Muisca religion
- Muzo religion
- Navajo religion
- Nuu-chah-nulth religion
- Omaha religion
- Osage religion
- Pawnee faith
- Parakanã shamanism
- Pech cosmogony
- Pemon religion
- Penobscot religion
- Pericues religion
- Piaroa religion
- Pueblo religion
  - Acoma Pueblo religion
  - Hopi religion
  - Zuni religion
  - Ancestral Pueblo religion (Basketmaker III) (Pueblo II) (Pueblo III) (Pueblo IV)
- Puruhá religion
- Q'ero religion
- Quechua religion
- Rikbaktsa religion
- Salish religion
- Seminole religion
- Seri religion
- Sioux religion
  - Assiniboine religion
  - Lakota religion
    - Wocekiye
- Southeastern Ceremonial Complex (religion of the Mississippian culture)
- Taensa religion
- Taino religion
- Tairona religion
- Tapirape shamanism
- Tehuelche religion
- Ticuna shamanism
- Toba religion
- Tlingit religion
- Tsimshian religion
- Ute religion
- Wai-Wai religion
- Wapishana religion
- Warao religion
- Washat Dreamers Religion
- Wayuu religion
- Western Shoshone religion
- Yaqui religion
- Yaruro religion

== See also ==
- Bahá'í Faith and Native Americans
- Falls Creek Baptist Conference Center
- Mythologies of the Indigenous peoples of the Americas
- Native American civil rights § Religious rights
- Okipa – The most important religious ceremony of the Mandan people

== Bibliography ==
- Aberle, David F. (1991) [1982]. The Peyote Religion among the Navajo. With Harvey C. Moore and Denis F. Johnston (2nd ed.). Norman, Okla.; London: University of Oklahoma Press. ISBN 0-8061-2382-6.
- Bird, Louis (2011). Telling Our Stories: Omushkego Legends & Histories from Hudson Bay. Toronto: University of Toronto Press. ISBN 978-1-55111-580-1.
- Brown, Brian Edward (1999). Religion, Law, and the Land: Native Americans and the Judicial Interpretations of Sacred Land. Westport, Conn: Greenwood Press. ISBN 978-0-313-30972-4.
- Brown, Joseph Epes (1982). The Spiritual Legacy of the American Indian. New York: Crossroad Pub. Co. ISBN 0-8245-0489-5.
- Brown, Joseph Epes; Cousins, Emily (2001). Teaching Spirits: Understanding Native American Religious Traditions. Oxford; New York: Oxford University Press. ISBN 0-19-513875-9.
- Buff, Rachel (1995). "Tecumseh and Tenskwatawa: Myth, Historiography and Popular Memory." Historical Reflections/Réflexions Historiques. pp. 277–299.
- Carpenter, Kristen A. (2005). A Property Rights Approach to Sacred Sites: Asserting a Place for Indians as Nonowners, 52 UCLA Law Review 1061.
- Carpenter, Kristen A. (2012). Individual Religious Freedoms in American Indian Tribal Constitutional Law, "The Indian Civil Rights Act at Forty." UCLA American Indian Studies Publications. ISBN 978-0-935626-67-4.
- Clinton, Bill (1996). "Executive Order 13007--Indian sacred sites". Weekly Compilation of Presidential Documents. 32 (21).
- Conrad, Geoffrey W.; Demarest, Arthur A. (2002) [1984]. Religion and Empire: The dynamics of Aztec and Inca expansionism. New studies in archaeology (Reprint ed.). Cambridge: Cambridge University Press. ISBN 0-521-24357-2.
- Deloria, Ella Cara (1929). "The Sun Dance of the Oglala Sioux". Journal of American Folklore. XLII (166): 354–413. doi:10.2307/535232. JSTOR 535232.
- Detwiler, F. (1983). The Sun Dance of the Oglala Sioux: A Case Study in Religion, Ritual, and Ethics. University Park, Pa.: Pennsylvania State University.
- Eliade, Mircea, ed. (1987). "North American Indian Religions". The Encyclopedia of Religion. Vol. 10. New York: Macmillan. ISBN 0-02-909810-6. | 2005 2nd ed.
  - Hultkrantz, Åke (1987). "North American Indian Religions: An Overview". The Encyclopedia of Religion – via Encyclopedia.com.
  - Fogelson, Raymond D. (1987). "North American Indian Religions: History of Study". The Encyclopedia of Religion – via Encyclopedia.com.
  - Kelley, Dennis F. (2005). "North American Indian Religions: Mythic Themes". The Encyclopedia of Religion (2nd ed.) – via Encyclopedia.com.
  - Champagne, Duane (2005). "North American Indian Religions: New Religious Movements". The Encyclopedia of Religion (2nd ed.) – via Encyclopedia.com.
- Eliade, Mircea, ed. (1987). "North American Indians". The Encyclopedia of Religion. Vol. 10. New York: Macmillan. ISBN 0-02-909810-6. | 2005 2nd ed.
  - Buckley, Thomas (1987). "North American Indians: Indians of California and the Intermountain Region". The Encyclopedia of Religion – via Encyclopedia.com.
  - Müller, Werner (1987). "North American Indians: Indians of the Far North". The Encyclopedia of Religion – via Encyclopedia.com.
  - Grim, John A.; John, Donald P. St. (1987). "North American Indians: Indians of the Northeast Woodlands". The Encyclopedia of Religion – via Encyclopedia.com.
  - "North American Indians: Indians of the Northwest Coast". The Encyclopedia of Religion. 1987.
  - Powers, William K. (1987). "North American Indians: Indians of the Plains". The Encyclopedia of Religion – via Encyclopedia.com.
  - Whiteley, Peter M. (1987). "North American Indians: Indians of the Southwest". The Encyclopedia of Religion – via Encyclopedia.com.
  - Zogry, Michael J. (2005). "North American Indians: Indians of the Southeast Woodlands". The Encyclopedia of Religion (2nd ed.).
- Eliade, Mircea, ed. (1987). "South American Indian Religions". The Encyclopedia of Religion. Vol. 13. New York: Macmillan. ISBN 0-02-909840-8. | 2005 2nd ed.
  - Zerries, Otto (1987). "South American Indian Religions: An Overview". The Encyclopedia of Religion. Translated by John Maressa – via Encyclopedia.com.
  - Poole, Deborah A. (1987). "South American Indian Religions: History of Study". The Encyclopedia of Religion – via Encyclopedia.com.
  - VÁzquez, Juan Adolfo (1987). "South American Indian Religions: Mythic Themes". The Encyclopedia of Religion – via Encyclopedia.com.
- Elk, Black (1953). The sacred pipe: Black Elk's account of the seven rites of the Oglala Sioux. Norman, Okla.; London: University of Oklahoma Press. OCLC 772729.
- Fogelson, Raymond D., ed. (2004). Southeast. Handbook of North American Indians, 14. William C. Sturtevant, series general editor. Washington, D.C.: Smithsonian Institution. ISBN 978-0-16-072300-1.
- Garrett, Michael; Garrett, J. T. (2003). Native American Faith in America. Faith in America. J. Gordon Melton, series editor. New York: Facts On File. ISBN 0-8160-4989-0.
- Getches, David H., Wilkinson, Charles F., Williams, Robert A. Jr. "Cases and Materials on Federal Indian Law- Fifth Edition." Thomas West Company: the United States, 1998. ISBN 978-0-314-14422-5.
- Gill, Sam D. (1982). Native American Religions: An Introduction. Religious Life in History. Belmont, Calif.: Wadsworth Pub. Co. ISBN 0-5340-0973-5.
- Gooren, Henri, ed. (2015). Encyclopedia of Latin American Religions. Springer International Pub. ISBN 978-3-319-08956-0. S2CID 239249964.
- Griffiths, Christopher N., ed. (2013). Indian sacred sites: balancing protection issues with federal management. America in the 21st century: political and economic issues. New York: Nova Science Publishers. ISBN 978-1628082845.
- Hirschfelder, Arlene; Molin, Paulette (2000) [1992]. Encyclopedia of Native American Religions: An Introduction. Foreword by Walter R. Echo-Hawk (Updated ed.). New York: Checkmark Books. ISBN 0-8160-3949-6.
- Hultkrantz, Åke (1979) [1967]. The Religions of the American Indians. Hermeneutics: Studies in the History of Religions, 463. Translated by Monica Setterwall. Berkeley & Los Angeles, Calif.: University of California Press. ISBN 0-520-02653-5.
- Kehoe, Alice Beck (2006) [1989]. The Ghost Dance: Ethnohistory and Revitalization (2nd ed.). Long Grove, Ill.: Waveland Press. ISBN 1-57766-453-1.
- Landes, Ruth (1968). Ojibwa Religion and the Midéwiwin. Madison, Wis.: University of Wisconsin Press.
- Leavelle, Tracy Neal (2010). "American Indians". In Goff, Philip (ed.). The Blackwell Companion to Religion in America. Malden, Mass.; Oxford: Wiley-Blackwell. pp. 397–416. ISBN 978-1-4051-6936-3.
- León-Portilla, Miguel (1990) [1963]. Aztec Thought and Culture: A Study of the Ancient Náhuatl Mind. The Civilization of the American Indian, 67. Translated by Jack Emory Davis (Reprint ed.). Norman, Okla.: University of Oklahoma Press. ISBN 0-8061-2295-1.
- León-Portilla, Miguel (1988) [1968]. Time and Reality in the Thought of the Maya. The Civilization of the American Indian, 190. Translated by Charles L. Boilès; Fernando Horcasitos; Miguel León-Portilla (2nd, enlarged ed.). Norman, Okla.: University of Oklahoma Press. ISBN 0-8061-2308-7.
- Melton, J. Gordon; et al., eds. (2009) [1978]. "Native American Religions". Melton's Encyclopedia of American Religions (8th ed.). Detroit, Mich.: Gale Cengage Learning. ISBN 978-0-787-69696-2. (archived)
- Merkur, Daniel (1985). Becoming Half Hidden: Shamanism and Initiation among the Inuit. Acta Universitatis Stockholmiensis • Stockholm Studies in Comparative Religion. Stockholm: Almqvist & Wiksell. ISBN 978-91-22-00752-4.
- Mooney, James (1896). The Ghost Dance Religion and Wounded Knee. New York: Dover Publications.
- Nabokov, Peter (2006). Where the Lightning Strikes The Lives of American Indian Sacred Places. Viking. ISBN 0670034320.
- Paper, Jordan (2007). Native North American Religious Traditions: Dancing For Life. Westport, Conn; London: Praeger. ISBN 978-0-2759-9097-8.
- Pearce, Q. L. (2012). Native American Mythology. Mythology and culture worldwide. Detroit, Mi: Lucent Books. ISBN 978-1-4205-0716-4.
- Pettipas, Katherine (1994). Serving the Ties That Bind: Government Repression of Indigenous Religious Ceremonies on the Prairies (PDF). Manitoba Studies in Native American History. Winnipeg: University of Manitoba Press. ISBN 0-88755-638-8.
- Rhodes, John (January 1991). "An American Tradition: The Religious Persecution Of Native Americans". Montana Law Review. 52 (1 (Winter)). ISSN 0026-9972.
- Rice, Julian (1998). Before the Great Spirit: The Many Faces of Sioux Spirituality. Albuquerque, N.M.: University of New Mexico Press. ISBN 0-8263-1868-1.
- Stewart, Omer C. (1987). Peyote Religion: A History. Norman, Okla. London: University of Oklahoma Press. ISBN 978-0-8061-2068-3.
- Tooker, Elisabeth, ed. (1979). Native North American Spirituality of the Eastern Woodlands: sacred myths, dreams, visions, speeches, healing formulas, rituals, and ceremonials. Mahwah, N.J.: Paulist Press. ISBN 0-8091-2256-1.
- Underhill, Ruth M. (1965). Red Manʼs Religion: Beliefs and Practices of the Indians North of Mexico. Chicago, Ill.; London: University of Chicago Press. ISBN 0-226-84167-7.
- Utter, Jack (2001). American Indians: Answers to Today's Questions (2nd ed.). Norman, Okla.; London: University of Oklahoma Press. ISBN 978-0-8061-3313-3.
- Waldman, Carl (2009). Atlas of the North American Indian. New York: Checkmark Books. ISBN 978-0-8160-6859-3.
- Wallace, Anthony F. C. (2010) [1970]. Death and Rebirth of the Seneca. With the assistance of Sheila C. Steen. New York; Toronto: Random House. ISBN 978-0-394-71699-2.
