= Agricultural spiritualism =

Agricultural spiritualism, or the Spirit of Agriculture, is the philosophy that the spiritual nature of humanity should be intentionally integrated with the methods behind food production, agriculture, and the environment. It calls for integrating spiritual practices and values into agriculture to increase both efficiency and sustainability.

Agricultural spiritualism teaches that spirituality is the need to live in harmony with some higher order of things; is inherent to human consciousness; and should be integrated into scientific developments in order to provide ethical guardrails.

Followers of this idea state the following reasons to justify this link: Agriculture was the preoccupation of the majority of the population of the world at the time that the major scriptures of the continuing religions were compiled; the approach that agriculture takes to creating the optimal conditions for production of its harvest is the same as that recommended by the traditional religions for producing insight or wisdom; historically, the adoption of agriculture liberated part of a population to focus on understanding of spirituality. By understanding spirituality, agricultural spiritualism addresses the questions regarding ethics in agriculture. It serves as a method for communication, and building a relationship, between the spirit of the land and the spirit of the people through an everyday practice.

== History ==
Agriculture is a driving force in the everyday aspect of living on and off the earth's resources. Agriculture was derived from the animistic and natural forces we feel as humans in order to "control the acquisition and use of energy". Any action by the feeder which increases the yield of a food in a given area over the natural yield turns the particular plant or animal being fostered into a secondary energy trap for the feeder – the one who then utilizes the additional energy produced. This was all considered with our location and actions being in relation to wherever the cosmos were above us and how that energy flows from centers of concentration to regions of diffusion.

Many agricultural rituals that have spiritual origins such as European Christians and Pagans drew their methods from "myths, imagery, and ritual practices from the ancient religions of Greece, Egypt, Mesopotamia, Ireland, and more, or from contemporary polytheistic traditions, such as Hinduism or Afro-Caribbean religions."

In his 2001 paper on "Reclaiming the Spiritual Roots of Farming", agricultural economist John Ickerd proposes:

Paraphrasing William James, a religious philosopher, one might define spirituality as a felt need to live in harmony with some higher order of things. This definition embraces a wide range of cultural beliefs, philosophies, and religions....

The current crisis in conventional, commercial agriculture arises from its lack of sustainability. It is not ecologically sound, it is not socially responsible, and thus, it is not economically viable over time. The sustainability of agriculture ultimately is rooted in the need to farm in harmony with the higher order of things – in spirituality.

...Sustainable agriculture means fitting farming to the farmer and the farm – not forcing either to fit some predefined prescription for progress. Sustainable farming means farming in harmony among people – within families, communities, and societies. Sustainable farming means farming in harmony with future generations – being good stewards of finite resources for an infinite future.</ref name=Ickerd>

This outlook on agriculture as a whole is purposeful in connecting the essence of its spiritual roots to modern-day farming practices to uphold farming's fundamentally biological nature while implementing sustainability. While practicing agricultural spiritualism, farmers value altruistic goals like peace and happiness, "We learn to pursue peace and happiness rather than success. We seek harmony among things economic, social, and spiritual not maximums or minimums."

By following this spiritual outlook, farmers are focused on adequate results, only utilizing resources for basic needs and necessary income. They believe that by not pushing for a maximum income, they are able to implement more responsible usage of resources and be in harmony with nature. Following agricultural spiritualism ideals is believed to create a more sustainable farming environment around the world which allows for a sustained desirable quality of life. This means being environmentally responsible and "farming in harmony with future generations being good stewards of finite resources for an infinite future."

== Goals and benefits ==
Agricultural spiritualism seeks a relationship with the land through spirituality. In various cultures with depleting land resources for food, spirituality is valued. Agricultural spiritualism could serve as a bridge between a lack of connection between these two ideals. Agricultural spiritualism incorporates morals into its practice that could address the food crisis problem. The world will require 70% more food by 2050, according to the Food and Agriculture Organization of the United Nations, which is at the cost of the land. Industrial farming is questioned to be sustainable for this demand of food production. Implementing agricultural spiritualism to a populated land relieves stress from the land and allows for a sustainable food sourcing practice that minimizes environmental degradation.

The practice of agricultural spiritualism exercises sustainability. Agroecosystems, which nurture a space for humans and agriculture to cohabitate, provide a system for agricultural spiritualism to be implemented. In terms of agricultural and sustainability, spiritualism is a common ground as discussed in Reclaiming the spiritual Roots of Farming, "A sustainable agriculture, likewise, has personal, interpersonal and spiritual dimensions." The way current food systems are implemented and practiced would provide a space for transition to agricultural spiritualism across more cultures. Many broken food systems would benefit from a connection between the spirit of the land and the spirit of the farmer to address the food crisis. Spiritual alterations in agriculture allow for a harmonious relationship with the earth. The benefits of practicing agricultural spiritualism include seeking harmony in the way people live. By reconnecting with the land, people understand its value. It forms a harmonious relationship between people and the land to be able to create a space for sustainable living. Ickerd mentions, "To farm and live sustainably, we must be willing to openly proclaim the spirituality of sustainability. We must reclaim the sacred in food and farming."

== Implementation ==
Practices related to agricultural spiritualism are being implemented in countries like Thailand and India. In India, agricultural spiritualism is rooted in ideas based on Mahatma Gandhi's agrarian legacy. It is practiced in this manner to reflect a nonviolent agricultural culture along with good food that is not reflected in industrial agricultural practices. Gandhi's Agrarian Legacy focuses on the social needs of village India. For example, Mahatma Gandhi's successors are implementing these practices through farm-ashrams. Ashrams are spiritual centers and communities. In these farm-ashrams, which "emphasize the dignity of human labor and promote bread-labor, people are encouraged to actively contribute to the food making processes to be able to consume that food.

A program in Thailand, Moral Rice, connects farmers with spirituality through Buddhism while practicing organic farming. The purpose of this method is to cleanse the farmers' spirit so the rice is purified and the consumers are consuming both spiritually and agriculturally purified rice. The practice of Buddhadasa is working to re-dignify the profession of farming. In Religion and Sustainable Agriculture: World Spiritual Traditions and Food Ethics by Alexander Kaufman said that, "In the last few decades, the concept of 'Buddhist agriculture' has been advanced by Thai environmental activists, farmer leaders, and socially engaged Buddhist monks."

== Presence within religions ==
One area in which the relationship between religion and agriculture is visible and encouraged is within the ethnic communities of The Tikar, Aghem, Chamba and Ngemba located in The Bamenda Grassfields of Cameroon in Africa. It is common throughout this region to observe and recognize how their religious interpretations of their surroundings have encouraged the development and emphasis on agriculture as a community. Christian European missionaries would come to Africa in order to spread religion, but ended up spreading the teachings of agriculture and its impacts on society. The people of the Bamenda Grassfields, because of their development being rooted in traditional Christianity, see farming as a religious act because of the belief that the Supreme Being has commanded them to till the earth and have dominion over it. The farmers grow their crops and organize their fields parallel to the control that their Supreme Being has over them as humans or mortal beings. Everything done is in respect to the powerful one and that they have blessed the people of the land with the gift to food and essentially energy and life itself.

Historically it has been noted that Buddhist communities also faced hardship when their focus shifted to materialistic matters, yet were prosperous and happy during times of agricultural focus. There is also a myth grounded in the Aggañña Sutta which explains how the Buddhist people were able to grow and harvest food easily until they became clouded by "the selfish desire to control nature".

== See also ==
- Religion and agriculture
- Fertility rite
- List of fertility deities
- Earth goddess
- Fall of man#Agricultural revolution
- List of agricultural deities
