= Ngendei (mythology) =

Fiji deity

In the mythology of Fiji, Ngendei is a fertility god who taught humanity the use of fire. (Note: Named as "Ngendi" in Pears Encyclopaedia.)

== See also ==
- Degei, a Fijian deity described in a very similar way
