= Christianity and agriculture =

Christian doctrines, ideologies and beliefs have influenced the manner in which human interactions with land, soil, and plants are manifested, both as a historical interplay between Christianity and land, and more contemporary movements where diverse sets of biblical readings, theological interpretations and Christian ethics are manifested in Christian approaches to food production.

== Christian stewardship: dominion and responsibility ==
Agriculture and Christianity are each important practices that have influenced the development of societies in Europe, the Americas and beyond. With the Bible originating in and reflecting a largely agricultural context, biblical narratives have inspired interpretations and positions that guide Christians' claims to care for land and underlie their rights to use it. One of the most prominent biblically-oriented themes in relation to the use of natural resources and land has been stewardship, which on a general and basic level implies responsible management of resources. Alongside Christian ethics of eco-justice and creation spirituality, stewardship ethics draw on the creation narrative in Genesis, where humans as the high-ranking servants, the stewards, are given authority over God's creation (Genesis 1:27–28, Genesis 2:15). The notion of Christian stewardship has not been univocal, but includes power and authority as well as humility and responsibility, features which have influenced different interpretations. Among Protestant denominations in North America, stewardship has often implied responsibility for deploying financial resources in ways that include tithing and maintaining congregational and mission work; other Christians have seen stewardship in relation to natural resources and, increasingly, to environmental concerns.

This Christian environmentalism contains two basic features: (1) stewardship as dominion over nature; and (2) stewardship as responsibility for maintaining the planet and for protecting God's creation. While both positions draw on a Christian anthropocentric worldview, dominion stewardship centers on the idea that interaction with nature should primarily enhance human life. In the context of modern industrialization, this has implied promoting human control as the exploitation of natural resources in the service of humanity. This legitimization of humankind's use and exploitation of natural resources has led to critique of Christianity's role in shaping a growing ecological crisis. In contrast, alternative Christian stewardship positions have interpreted humans' elevated role as answerable for caring for God's creation in an ecologically sustainable way, which in the 21st century also implies reversal of humanity's negative impact on the world's ecosystems. This makes stewardship a vocation engaged in the well-being of the material world, that sees environmental responsibility as part of a work towards social justice, human/nature relations and peace more broadly.

== Monastic gardens and agriculture ==
While monastic rules tell little about how monks and nuns were to support themselves, it is likely that in the deserts of Egypt, on the islands of Greece and of the coast of Ireland, the first Christian monks and hermits depended on forms of gardening, gathering and fishing. Since the mid-sixth century and onward, Christian monasteries in Europe and the Middle East also developed agricultural practices to remain self-contained and avoid contact with the outer world. Through the middle ages, the land that monastic communities monitored however followed the tides of the rest of feudal Europe. Monastic orders took on management roles and cultivated land through the use of labor tenants. This approach slowly changed the 11th century when monastic orders such as the Cistercians advocated a return to a simpler way of living and that monks and nuns return to work the land themselves rather than serve as overseers. This developed new forms of monastic farming that emerged in the 12th century. While these changes were born to keep Benedictine, Cistercian, Franciscan and later Jesuit monks from being contaminated by worldly matters and political schemes, it made monasteries into hubs where agriculture and gardening practices thrived. Under St Bernard, St Francis and Alan of Lille, monastic communities' return to agricultural manual labor became interpreted as modes of turning wilderness (chaos) into paradise (order). These patterns came to influence agricultural ideas and values not just in the western context but also across the world when monastic orders spread through migration, mission and western imperial expansion. The relationship between work, Christianity and agriculture was also prominent in Protestant pietistic movements’ struggle for religious freedom, autonomy and self-reliance in Europe during the 1600 and 1700s. This context forced some Protestant groups to leave Europe for North America. For many of these, agriculture served as a prominent feature in the relocation on the new continent (e.g. Mennonite Christians).

== Christian missions, colonialism and farming ==
In the western colonial expansions globally from the 1500s onward, Christian mission and agriculture served as central features when “newly discovered” areas were seized under the control of new empires. Especially in British imperialism, the construction of enclosed gardens served as means of domesticating lands under new rule. Agricultural practices role in transforming “the wild” into habitable places were prevalent in (western) Christian traditions and followed Christian missionaries. Alongside education and medicine, agriculture helped spread western power and influence through Christian missions.

=== Africa ===
In African contexts, western missionaries often saw Christian evangelization as connected to economic development and new ways of social organization. The Scottish explorer and missionary David Livingstone for instance saw the aim of missionary societies in Africa to be the spread of the three Cs; “Christianity, Commerce and Civilization.” From the 1800s onward, Christian missions across Africa did not just preach the gospel but were heavily engaged in promoting new ways of living through education and medical work. The rationale behind this approach was the belief in that by teaching Africans practical, technological and commercial skills, African societies could develop into more self-sufficient and “civilized” entities. This would also practically facilitate settings where a Christian lifestyle could be fully lived out. Connected to these ideas, the promotion of industrial missions generated a wide range of training seminars and education as a means to generate progress and African industrialization. The Zambezi Industrial Mission in present day Malawi, the Basel Mission in Ghana and Protestant missions in Nigeria were all places where Christian teachings merged with education in agriculture to promote large-scale production of new cash crops such as cocoa, coffee and tea. The local perception of new agricultural practices and technological innovations introduced by Christian missionaries differed across Africa and ranged between accommodation and rejection. In South Africa, African chiefs often valued these new skills and technical tools. Local adaptation generated new means of production that came to alter traditional farming practices and social relations in producing food. The introduction of the plough, for instance, created economic incentives that drew men into agricultural domains that previously had been connected to subsistence farming and were the responsibility of women.

=== Contemporary mission ===
Even though Christian missions work has over the last century changed dramatically in outlook, the message of the gospel remains an important feature for Christian missions across the globe, especially through commitment to development work that enhances people’s livelihood. In the wider context of an emerging ecological crisis and climate change, food security, environmental care, sustainable living and farming have remained important features in how Christian communities and churches work with questions of poverty, development and social justice. This “greening” of Christianity has produced renewed focus on Christian practical engagement with nature, soil and land, as well as the work of cultivating food.

== Contemporary Christian approaches to farming ==
Present-day modes of Christian farming are situated in a wider context of faith-based development work, religious agrarianism and environmental ethics and so address humans’ use of land and natural resources following modernity, industrialization and the agricultural green revolution since the 1950s. It reflects a general “greening” trend within Christianity globally where questions on Christians’ responsibility for addressing environmental concerns form part of Christian theological and ethical discourse. Pope Francis' encyclical Laudatio Si from 2015, which builds on the model of St Francis of Assisi and the environmental teachings of John Paul II, is one example. Others are the environmental work of the World Council of Churches, and a range of faith-based development organs and organizations within Roman Catholic, Orthodox and Protestant traditions. Part of the greening of Christianity is also a wider body of eco-theological and ecofeminist scholarly work that address Christianity's past, present and future relationships to nature.

Approaches to Christian farming have also been highly influenced by North American lay Christian farmers, Christian theologians, and agrarian thinkers such as Wendell Berry, Wes Jackson, Thomas Berry and D.J. Hall. Since the 1970s, this has generated a new Christian ethic of farming under the framework of religious agrarianism. In practical terms, Christian agrarianism should regenerate rather than degenerate the environment and God’s creation. Religious agrarian thinkers unite in their critique of the industrial, mechanized and reductive agriculture of the green revolution and its impact on rural farming communities locally as well as globally. They oppose industrial farms' use of chemical fertilizers and pesticides. Instead, organic, hand-driven farming is stressed in light of social justice, health and relation to place in holistic terms. Such approaches have influenced North American Christian farmers ranging from Joel Salatin at the Polyface farms to the Roman Catholic Sister Miriam Macgillis at the Genesis farm. United in Christian agrarian ethics of sustainability and care for creation, this translates into biodynamic, organic and communal shared features of cultivating food that also include Christian applications of permaculture and regenerative agricultural designs. It also features communitarian living, communal teaching and work, and trends connected to new monasticism, that place religious values in conversation with wider secular environmental ethics.

Present-day Christian farming is also present in relation to agricultural development, questions of food security and poverty. It overlaps with religious agrarianism but is primarily present in the global south. One example goes under the name of “Farming God’s Way” which today is present through a wide variety of networks and Christian communities in over 20 countries in Africa as well as in Mexico, Bangladesh, Cambodia and the US. Farming God’s Way is considered one of the most extensive “theologically-shaped farming narrative” globally and have been part of the work of the Alliance of Religions and Conservation funded by Prince Philip (closed since 2019). Farming God’s Way combines biblical readings with agricultural techniques also known as conservation agriculture, in which methods of not disturbing the soil (no-tilling), crop-rotation and the application of mulch cover are promoted as ways of mitigating climate change and environmental stress on depleted soils while at the same time increase productivity.

Faith-based farming methods such as Farming God’s Way have received critique from researchers within agrarian development for not considering local and contextual circumstances, but instead presenting it as a one size fits all model based on divine principles. The presence of Christian actors in creating sustainable farming models has also been analyzed from a value-based approach, though the impact of faith on agricultural development has been contested by program managers because of the mindset change it creates.

== See also ==
- Religion and agriculture
