= Banka-Mundi =

Khond goddess of the hunt

Banka-Mundi is the goddess of the hunt and fertility of the Khond people of India. The Khonds worship Banka-Mundi for protection against the wild animals of the forests, and she is said to remove fear and provide fertility.
