= Onuava =

Celtic fertility goddess

Onuava is a Celtic fertility goddess. She is associated with the earth and is known only from inscriptions in Gaul.
