= Religion and agriculture =

Religion and agriculture have been closely associated since Neolithic times and the development of early Orphic religions based upon fertility and the seasons.

== See also ==
- Agricultural spiritualism
- Christianity and agriculture
- Earth goddess
- Fall of man
- Fertility rite
- Human sacrifice
- List of fertility deities
