= List of culture heroes =

Mythological heroes, creators, teachers and inventors

A culture hero is a mythological hero specific to a group of people (cultural, ethnic, religious, etc.), who changes the world through invention or discovery. A typical culture hero might be credited as the discoverer of fire or agriculture, songs, tradition, law or religion, and is usually one of the most important legendary figures of a people, sometimes as the founder of its ruling dynasty.

== Abenaki mythology ==
- Bedig-wajo (southern)
- Glooscap
- Ktaden (western)

== Abrahamic mythology (Judaism, Christianity, Islam) ==
- 12 Apostles
- Abraham
- Adam
- Ali
- Joseph
- Dhu al-Qarnayn
- Gabriel
- Husayn ibn Ali
- Moses
- Raphael
- Noah
- Israfil
- David
- Elijah
- John the Baptist
- Jesus
- Muhammad
- Saint George
- Samson
- Solomon

== Ainu mythology ==
- Ae-oyna-kamuy
- Kotan-kar-kamuy

== Albanian mythology ==
- Drangue

== Armenian mythology ==
- Anahit
- Aramazd
- Hayk
- Vahagn

== Ashanti mythology ==
- Anansi
- Omoja
- Kwase Benefo

== Australian Aboriginal mythology ==
- Bunjil
- I'wai
- Rainbow Serpent
- Wurrunna

== Aztec mythology ==
- Ce Acatl Topiltzin
- Teotl

== Banks Islands mythology ==
- Qat

== Buddhist mythology ==
- Bodhisattvas
- Buddha
- Bodhidharma

== Caroline Islands mythology ==
- Isokelekel

== Celtic mythology ==
- Lugus
- Matres and Matronae
- Maponos
- Taranis

== Chinese mythology ==
- Five Elders
- Fuxi
- Suiren
- Shujun
- Zhuanxu
- Ling Lun
- Kui
- Yao
- Shun
- Yu the Great
- Duke of Zhou
- Confucius
- Mencius
- Shen

== Egyptian mythology ==
- Menes
- Ptah-hotep
- Netjeru

== Etruscan mythology ==
- Tarchon
- Tyrrhenus

== Finnish mythology ==
- Ilmarinen
- Lemminkäinen
- Joukahainen
- Väinämöinen
- Kaleva
- Kullervo

== Greek mythology ==
- Achaean Leaders
- Aristaeus
- Atreidai
- Abderus
- Atalanta
- Actaeon
- Amphitryon
- Antilochus
- Argonauts
- Bellerophon
- Cadmus
- Cecrops
- Chiron
- Chrysippus
- Daedalus
- Dido
- Eleusis
- Eunostus
- Erichthonius
- Icarus
- Iolaus
- Oedipus
- Leonidas
- Lycaon
- Meleager
- Midas
- Niobe
- Orion
- Orpheus
- Pandion
- Parthenope
- Pandora
- Perseus
- Phoroneus
- Sisyphus
- Theseus
- Tantalus
- Tiresias
- Telegonus
- Triptolemos
- Theoús

== Hungarian mythology ==
- Álmos
- Hunor and Magor

== Inca mythology ==
- Inti
- Manco Cápac
- Viracocha

== Indian mythology ==
- Arjuna
- Ashoka
- Barbarika
- Bharata
- Bharat
- Bhima
- Bhishma
- Chandragupta Maurya
- Draupadi
- Ganesha
- Guru Nanak
- Hanuman
- Harishchandra
- Karna
- Krishna
- Mahavira
- Manu
- Mamuni Mayan
- Meghnad
- Nakul
- Parashurama
- Rama
- Rishabha
- Sahadeva
- King Shivi
- Shiva
- Sita
- Vikramaditya
- Vishvamitra
- Yudhishthira

Vasistha Pururaba Vyasa Parashara Sahara Bhagirath Dhanvantari Palkapya Shalihotra Divodasa Pratardan Nimi Nemi janaka Prithu

== Irish mythology ==
- Cú Chulainn
- Diarmuid Ua Duibhne
- Fionn mac Cumhail (Finn McCool)
- Lugh
- Oisín

== Ho-Chunk mythology ==
- Red Horn

== Inuit mythology ==
- Apanuugak
- Kiviuq

== Japanese mythology ==
- Kami
- Abe Masakatsu
- Akechi Mitsuhide
- Ashikaga Takauji
- Date Masamune
- Honda Tadakatsu
- Minamoto no Tametomo
- Minamoto no Yoritomo
- Minamoto no Yoshitsune
- Miura Yoshimoto
- Miyamoto Musashi
- Takeda Nobushige
- Takeda Shingen
- Tomoe Gozen
- Tokugawa Ieyasu
- Toyotomi Hideyori
- Benkei
- Fujiwara no Hidesato
- Emperor Jimmu
- Empress Jingū
- Kato Kiyomasa
- Kibitsuhiko-no-mikoto
- Kintarō
- Kusunoki Masashige
- Kotoshironushi
- Minamoto no Yorimitsu
- Minamoto no Yoshimitsu
- Minamoto no Yoshitsune
- Minamoto no Yoshiie
- Miyamoto Musashi
- Momotarō
- Nomi no Sukune
- Emperor Ōjin
- Ōkuninushi
- Ōmononushi
- Ono no Komachi
- Oda Nobunaga
- Sakanoue no Tamuramaro
- Sanada Yukimura
- Taira no Sadamori
- Takemikazuchi
- Takeminakata
- Takenouchi no Sukune
- Takezaki Suenaga
- Takeda Shingen
- Tokugawa Ieyasu
- Toyotomi Hideyoshi
- Tsukuyomi
- Urabe no Suetake
- Urashima Tarō
- Uesugi Kenshin
- Uesugi Kagekatsu
- Usui Sadamitsu
- Watanabe no Tsuna
- Yamato Takeru

== Korean mythology ==
- Haneunim
- Hwanung
- Hyeokgeose
- Jumong
- Tan'gun

== Lakota mythology ==
- Iktomi

== Maya mythology ==
- Maya Hero Twins
- Ku

== Mesopotamian mythology ==
- Enkidu
- Gilgamesh
- Ziusudra

== Muisca mythology ==
- Bochica

== Navajo mythology ==
- Changing Woman
- The Diyin Dine
- Nayenezgani

== Norse mythology ==
- Amleth
- Arngrim
- Bödvar Bjarki
- Bjorn Ironside
- Cnut the Great
- Egil
- Egil Skallagrimsson
- Eric Bloodaxe
- Erik The Red
- Sweyn Forkbeard
- Harald Bluetooth
- Harald Hardrada
- Harald Fairhair
- Helgi
- Hothbrodd
- Ymir
- Norns
- Ivar the Boneless
- Ragnar Lodbrok
- Rollo
- Gunnar Hamundarson
- Sigurd Fafnersbane
- Starkad
- Svipdagr
- Leif Erikson
- Freydis Eiriksdottir
- Guðs

== Ohlone mythology ==
- Kaknu

== Ojibwe mythology ==
- Nanabozho

== Persian mythology ==
- Ardashir-e Bābakān
- Arash
- Afrasiab
- Abu Muslim Khorasani
- Amir Arsalan
- Anahita
- Babak Khorramdin
- Banu Goshasp
- Bahram-e Gur
- Bahram Chobin
- Bizhan
- Borzu son of Sohrab
- Cyrus the Great
- Darab Shah
- Esfandiyār
- Farhād
- Faramarz
- Fereydun
- Garshasp
- Giv
- Goudarz
- Hasan-i Sabbah
- Hushang
- Iraj son of Fereydun
- Jamshid
- Kaveh the Blacksmith
- Kay Kawad
- Kay Kāvus
- Kay Khosrow
- Kay Lohrasp
- Kay Bahman
- Keyumars
- Khosrow Anushiravan
- Khosrow Parviz
- Kush the Tusked
- Kiya Buzurg-Ummid
- Mashya and Mashyana
- Nariman
- Rostam
- Sām
- Salm son of Fereydun
- Siyâvash
- Sohrab
- Tahmurath
- Tous son of Nowzar
- Tur son of Fereydun
- Vishtaspa
- Zarēr
- Yazatas
- Zoroaster

== Polynesian mythology ==
- Atua
- Atonga
- Māui

== Roman mythology ==
- Deus
- Imperatoris
- Aeneas
- Dido
- Egeria
- Caeculus
- Cloelia
- Evander of Pallene
- Gaius Mucius Scaevola
- Gnaeus Marcius Coriolanus
- Horatii and Curiatii
- Horatius Cocles
- Lupa
- Julius Caesar
- Lucius Junius Brutus
- Lucius Quinctius Cincinnatus
- Lucretia
- Manius Curius Dentatus
- Marcus Curtius
- Marcus Furius Camillus
- Marcus Manlius Capitolinus
- Numa Pompilius
- Romulus
- Scipio Africanus
- Servius Tullius
- Silvius
- Tarpeia
- Titus Manlius Imperiosus Torquatus
- Verginia

== Serbian mythology ==
- Saint Sava
- Svevlad
- Mihailo Vojislavljević

== Slavic mythology ==
- Ivan Tsarevich
- Krakus
- Samo
- Piast
- Misizla

== Solomon Islands mythology ==
- Qat
- To-Kabinana

== Talamancan mythology ==
- Sibú

== Tibetan mythology ==
- Gesar
- Pha Trelgen Changchup Sempa

== Turkic mythology ==
- Alpamysh
- Bamsi Beyrek
- Battal Gazi
- Dede Korkut
- Koroghlu
- Manas
- Oghuz Khagan
- Ural-batyr

== Ugarit mythology ==
- Danel

== Ute mythology ==
- Cin-an-ev

== Vietnamese mythology ==
- Kinh Dương Vương
- Lạc Long Quân
- Thánh Gióng
- Thạch Sanh
- Thành hoàng

== Weenhayek mythology ==
- Ahutsetajwaj
- Tapiatsa

== Welsh mythology ==
- Bendigeidfran
- Ceridwen
- Dôn
- Gwydion
- Hu Gadarn
- Lleu Llaw Gyffes
- Lud son of Heli
- Magnus Maximus
- Merlin
- Modron
- Pryderi
- Pwyll
- Rhiannon

== Zuni mythology ==
- Ahayuta
- Awonawilona

== See also ==
- List of folk heroes
