= Comparative mythology =

Comparison of myths from different cultures

Comparative mythology is the comparison of myths from different cultures in an attempt to identify shared themes and characteristics. Comparative mythology has served a variety of academic purposes. For example, scholars have used the relationships between different myths to trace the development of religions and cultures, to propose common origins for myths from different cultures, and to support various psychoanalytical theories.

The comparative study of mythologies reveals the trans-national motifs that unify spiritual understanding globally. The significance of this study generates a "broad, sympathetic understanding of these 'stories' in human history". The similarities of myths remind humanity of the universality in the human experience.

== Background ==
Anthropologist C. Scott Littleton defined comparative mythology as "the systematic comparison of myths and mythic themes drawn from a wide variety of cultures". By comparing different cultures' mythologies, scholars try to identify underlying similarities and/or to reconstruct a "protomythology" from which those mythologies developed. To an extent, all theories about mythology follow a comparative approach—as scholar of religion Robert Segal notes, "by definition, all theorists seek similarities among myths". However, scholars of mythology can be roughly divided into particularists, who emphasize the differences between myths, and comparativists, who emphasize the similarities. Particularists tend to "maintain that the similarities deciphered by comparativists are vague and superficial", while comparativists tend to "contend that the differences etched by particularists are trivial and incidental".

Comparative approaches to mythology held great popularity among eighteenth- and nineteenth-century scholars. Many of these scholars believed that all myths showed signs of having evolved from a thought which interpreted nearly all myths as poetic descriptions of the sun's behavior. According to this theory, these poetic descriptions had become distorted over time into seemingly diverse stories about gods and heroes. However, modern-day scholars lean more toward particularism, feeling suspicious of broad statements about myths. A recent exception is the historical approach followed in E.J. Michael Witzel's reconstruction of many subsequent layers of older myths.

== Approaches ==
Comparative mythologists come from various fields, including folklore, literature, history, linguistics, and religious studies, and they have used a variety of methods to compare myths.

=== Linguistic ===
Some scholars look at the linguistic relationships between the myths of different cultures. For example, the similarities between the names of gods in different cultures. One particularly successful example of this approach is the study of Indo-European mythology. Scholars have found striking similarities between the mythological and religious terms used in different cultures of Europe and India. For example, the Greek sky-god Zeus Pater, the Roman sky-god Jupiter, and the Indian (Vedic) sky-god Dyauṣ Pitṛ have linguistically identical names.

This suggests that the Greeks, Romans, and Indians originated from a common ancestral culture, and that the names Zeus, Jupiter, Dyaus and the Germanic Tiu (cf. English Tues-day) evolved from an older name, *Dyēus ph_{2}ter, which referred to the sky-god or, to give an English cognate, the divine father in a Proto-Indo-European religion. An approach which is both historical and comparative was recently proposed by E.J. Michael Witzel. He compares collections of mythologies and reconstructs increasingly older levels, parallel to but not necessarily dependent on language families. The most prominent common feature is a storyline that extends from the creation of the world and of humans to their end. This feature is found in the northern mythologies of Eurasia and the Americas ("Laurasia") while it is missing in the southern mythologies of Subsaharan Africa, New Guinea and Australia ("Gondwanaland").

Mythological phylogenies also are a potentially powerful way to test hypotheses about cross-cultural relationships among folktales.

=== Structural ===
Some scholars look for underlying structures shared by different myths. The folklorist Vladimir Propp proposed that many Russian fairy tales have a common plot structure, in which certain events happen in a predictable order. In contrast, the anthropologist Claude Lévi-Strauss examined the structure of a myth in terms of the abstract relationships between its elements, rather than their order in the plot. In particular, Lévi-Strauss believed that the elements of a myth could be organized into binary oppositions (raw vs. cooked, nature vs. culture, etc.). He thought that the myth's purpose was to "mediate" these oppositions, thereby resolving basic tensions or contradictions found in human life or culture.

=== Psychoanalysis ===
Some scholars propose that myths from different cultures reveal the same, or similar, psychoanalytic forces at work in those cultures. Some Freudian thinkers have identified stories similar to the Greek story of Oedipus in many different cultures. They argue that these stories reflect the different expressions of the Oedipus complex in those cultures. Likewise, Jungians have identified images, themes, and patterns that appear in the myths of many different cultures. They believe that these similarities result from archetypes present in the unconscious levels of every person's mind.

== Motifs ==
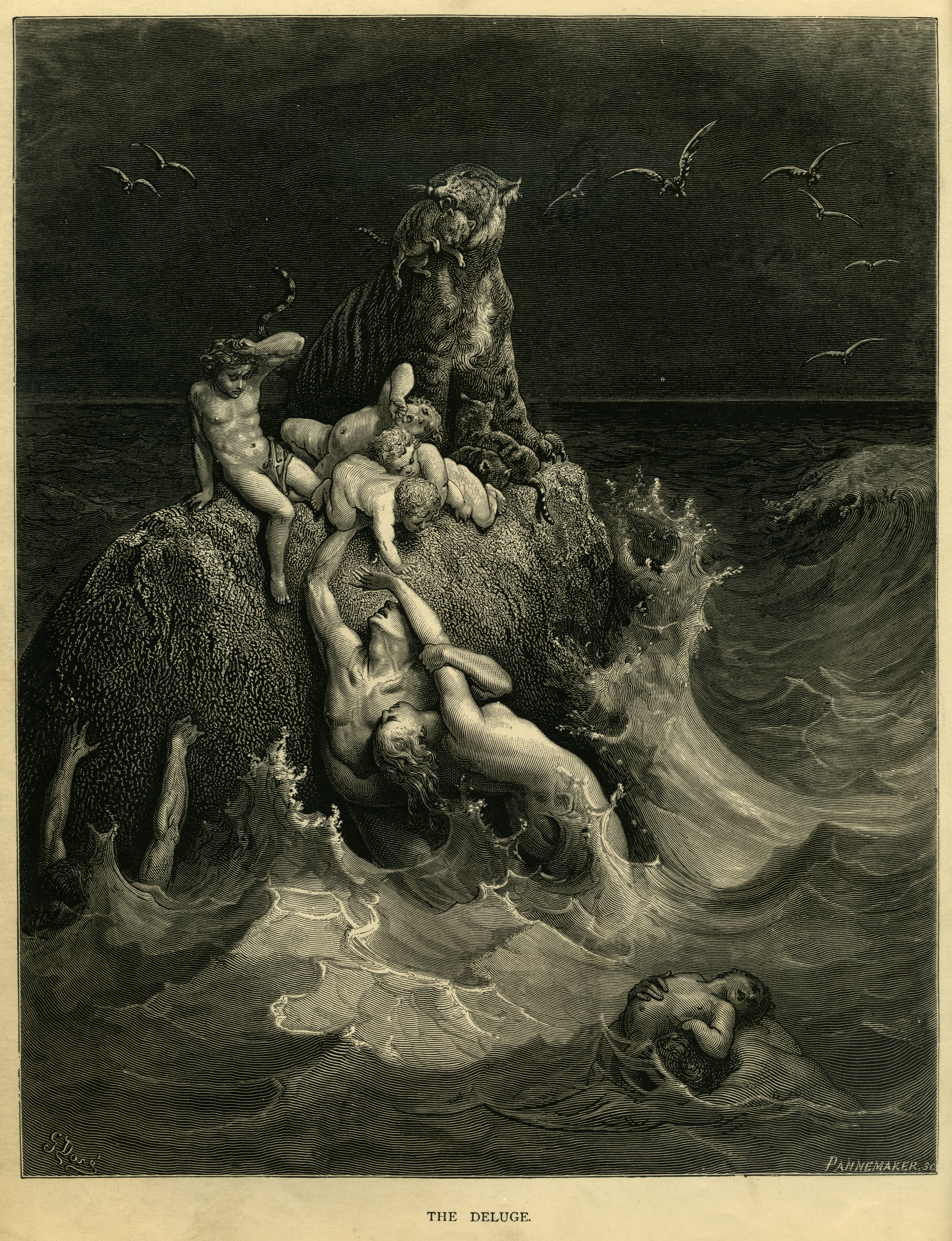
The Deluge, frontispiece to Gustave Doré's illustrated edition of the Bible. Based on the story of Noah's Ark, this engraving shows humans and a tiger doomed by the flood futilely attempting to save their children and cubs.

=== Creation of the earthly realm ===
A creation myth (or cosmogonic myth) is a symbolic narrative of how the world began and how people first came to inhabit it. While in popular usage the term myth often refers to false or fanciful stories, members of cultures often ascribe varying degrees of truth to their creation myths. In the society in which it is told, a creation myth is usually regarded as conveying profound truths – metaphorically, symbolically, historically, or literally. They are commonly, although not always, considered cosmogonical myths – that is, they describe the ordering of the cosmos from a state of chaos or amorphousness.

Creation myths often share a number of features. They often are considered sacred accounts and can be found in nearly all known religious traditions. They are all stories with a plot and characters who are either deities, human-like figures, or animals, who often speak and transform easily. They are often set in a dim and nonspecific past that historian of religion Mircea Eliade termed in illo tempore ('at that time'). Creation myths address questions deeply meaningful to the society that shares them, revealing their central worldview and the framework for the self-identity of the culture and individual in a universal context.

Creation myths develop in oral traditions and therefore typically have multiple versions; found throughout human culture, they are the most common form of myth.

==== Omne Vivum ex Ovo (Cosmic Egg) ====
The cosmic egg is a mythological motif found in the cosmogonies of many cultures and civilizations, including in Proto-Indo-European mythology. Typically, there is an egg which, upon "hatching", either gives rise to the universe itself or gives rise to a primordial being who, in turn, creates the universe. The egg is sometimes lain on the primordial waters of the Earth. Typically, the upper half of the egg, or its outer shell, becomes the heaven (firmament) and the lower half, or the inner yolk, becomes the Earth. The motif likely stems from simple elements of an egg, including its ability to offer nourishment and give rise to new life, as is reflected by the Latin proverb omne vivum ex ovo ('all life comes from an egg').

=== Primordial Chaos ===
Chaos (Ancient Greek: χάος, romanized: kháos) (aka Primordial Chaos, Primordial Void) is the mythological void state preceding the creation of the universe (the cosmos) in Greek creation myths. In Christian theology, the same term is used to refer to the gap or the abyss created by the separation of heaven and earth. In Norse mythology, Ginnungagap (old Norse: [ˈɡinːoŋɡɑˌɡɑp]; "gaping abyss", "yawning void") is the primordial void mentioned in the Gylfaginning, the Eddaic text recording Norse cosmogony. In Chinese mythology, the state of existence before the creation of the universe is often referred to as Hundun (混沌), which translates to "primordial chaos" - essentially a formless, undifferentiated state where everything was mixed together before the creation deity, Pangu, separated heaven and earth.

=== Creation of mankind from clay ===
The creation of man from clay is a theme that recurs throughout numerous world religions and mythologies.

In the Epic of Gilgamesh, Enkidu is created by the goddess Aruru out of clay. In Greek mythology, Prometheus molded men out of water and earth. Per the Hebrew Bible, (Genesis 2:7) "And the Lord God formed man of the dust of the ground, and breathed into his nostrils the breath of life; and man became a living soul". In Hindu mythology, the mother of Ganesh, Parvati, made Ganesh from her skin. In Chinese mythology (see Chu Ci and Imperial Readings of the Taiping Era), Nüwa molded figures from the yellow earth, giving them life and the ability to bear children.

==== First Humans ====
A protoplast, from ancient Greek πρωτόπλαστος (prōtóplastos, "first-formed"), in a religious context initially referred to the first human or, more generally, to the first organized body of progenitors of mankind in a creation myth.

Numerous examples exist throughout history of a human couple being the progenitors of the entire human species. This would include, but not limited to Adam and Eve of Abrahamism, Ask and Embla of Norse mythology, and Fuxi and Nüwa from Chinese mythos.

In Hindu mythology, Manu refers to the archetypal man. In Sanskrit the term for 'human', मानव (IAST: mānava) means 'of Manu' or 'children of Manu'. The Manusmriti is an ancient legal text and constitution among the many Dharmaśāstras of Hinduism and is believed to be a discourse given by Manu.

=== Acquisition of fire for the benefit of humanity ===
The theft of fire for the benefit of humanity is a theme that recurs in many world mythologies. A few examples include: in Greek mythology, according to Hesiod, the Titan Prometheus steals the heavenly fire for humanity, enabling the progress of civilization. In the Book of Enoch, the fallen angels and Azazel teach early humanity use of tools and fire. Per the ancient Indian collection of Vedic Sanskrit hymns, the Rigveda (3:9.5), speaks of a hero Mātariśvan who recovered fire which had been hidden from humanity.

=== Flood myth ===
Cultures around the world tell stories about a great flood. In many cases, the flood leaves only one survivor or group of survivors. For example, both the Babylonian Epic of Gilgamesh and the Hebrew Bible tell of a global flood that wiped out humanity and of a man who saved the Earth's species by taking them aboard a boat. Similar stories of a single flood survivor appear in Hindu mythology where Manu saves the Earth from the deluge by building an ark as well as Greek, Norse mythology, Inca mythology and Aztec mythology. The flood narratives, spanning across different traditions such as Mesopotamian, Hebrew, Islamic, and Hindu, reveal striking similarities in their core elements, including divine warnings, ark construction, and the preservation of righteousness, highlighting the universal themes that thread through diverse religious beliefs.

=== Dying god ===
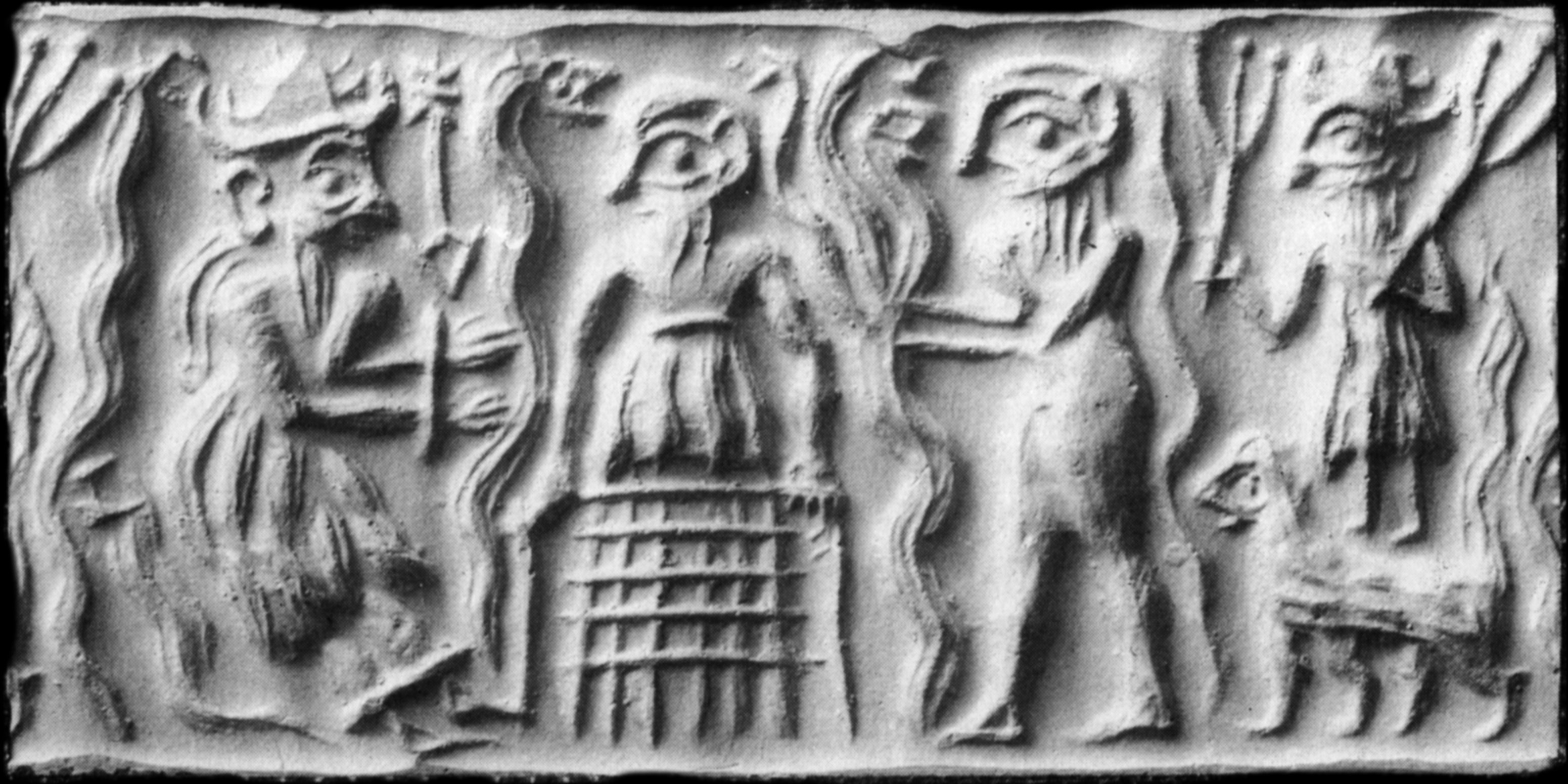
Ancient Sumerian cylinder seal impression showing the god Dumuzid being tortured in the Underworld by galla demons

Many myths feature a god who dies and who often returns to life. Such myths are particularly common in Near Eastern mythologies. The anthropologist Sir James Frazer compared these dying god myths in his multi-volume work The Golden Bough. The Egyptian god Osiris and the Mesopotamian god Tammuz are examples of the dying god, while the Greek myths of Adonis (though a mortal) has often been compared to Osiris and the myths of Zagreus and Dionysos also feature both death and rebirth. Some scholars have noted similarities between polytheistic stories of dying gods and the Christian story of Jesus of Nazareth.

=== Creative sacrifice ===
Many cultures have stories about divine figures whose death creates an essential part of reality. These myths seem especially common among cultures that grow crops, particularly tubers. One such myth from the Wemale people of Seram Island, Indonesia, tells of a miraculously conceived girl named Hainuwele, whose murdered corpse sprouts into the people's staple food crops. The Chinese myth of Pangu, the Indian Vedic myth of Purusha, and the Norse myth of Ymir all tell of a cosmic giant who is killed to create the world.

=== Axis mundi ===
Many mythological beliefs mention a place that sits at the center of the world and acts as a point of contact between different levels of the universe. This axis mundi is often marked by a sacred tree or other mythical object. For example, many myths describe a great tree or pillar joining heaven, earth, and the underworld. Vedic India, ancient China, Mayans, Incas and the Germanic peoples all had myths featuring a Cosmic Tree whose branches reach heaven and whose roots reach hell. The ancient Greeks believed in the centre of the universe - Delphi, where a prophetic oracle lived. The story goes that Zeus, king of gods released two birds in opposite directions to fly around the world. The place they met was Delphi.

=== Deus otiosus ===
Many cultures believe in a celestial supreme being who has cut off contact with humanity. Historian Mircea Eliade calls this supreme being a deus otiosus (an "idle god"), although this term is also used more broadly, to refer to any god who does not interact regularly with humans. In many myths, the Supreme Being withdraws into the heavens after the creation of the world. Baluba mythology features such a story, in which the supreme god withdraws from the earth, leaving man to search for him. Similarly, the mythology of the Hereros tells of a sky god who has abandoned mankind to lesser divinities. In the mythologies of highly complex cultures, the supreme being tends to disappear completely, replaced by a strong polytheistic belief system. In Greek mythology, "Chaos", the creator of the universe, disappears after creating primordial deities such as Gaea (Earth), Uranus (Sky), Pontus (Water) and Tartarus (Hell), among others.

=== Titanomachy ===
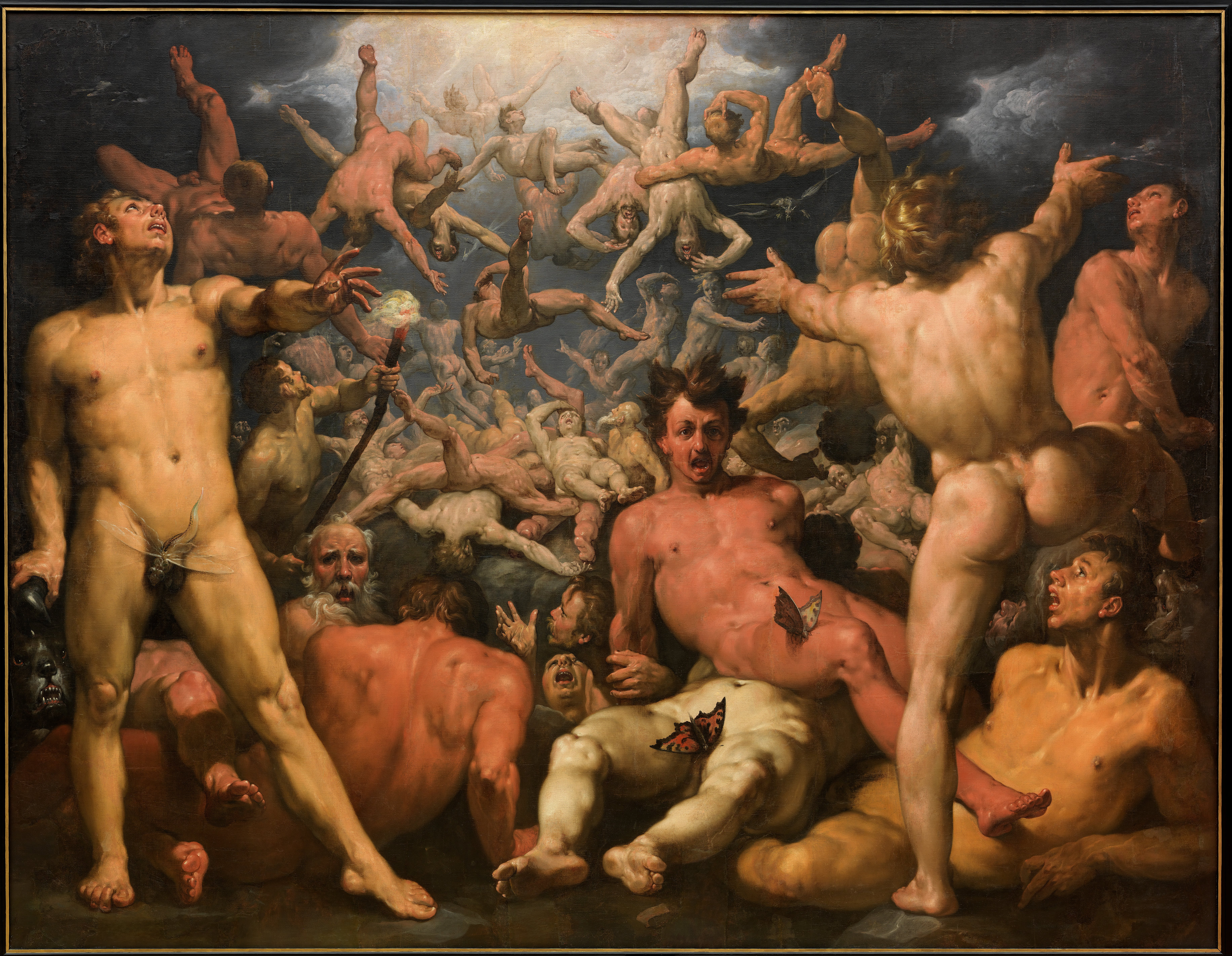
The Fall of the Titans (1596–98) by Cornelis Cornelisz van Haarlem

Many cultures have a creation myth in which a group of younger, more civilized gods conquers and/or struggles against a group of older gods.

In Hindu mythology, the younger devas (gods) battle the older asuras (demons).

In the Greek myth of the Titanomachy, the Olympian gods defeat the Titans, an older and more primitive divine race, and establish cosmic order.

In Norse mythology, the Aesir and Vanir are two distinct groups of gods who initially waged a war against each other, but eventually reconciled and formed a united pantheon

=== Anti-gods and Gigantomachy ===
In various mythologies, a group of "anti-gods" or adversarial beings oppose the main pantheon of gods, They embody chaos, destruction, or primal forces and are often considered demons or evil gods/divinities due to their opposition to divine order, symbolizing a struggle between cosmic order and chaos, good and evil.

In particular, The Gigantomachy is a motif found in Greek mythology where the Olympian gods battle the Giants, often depicted as a cataclysmic struggle between order and chaos. This motif has parallels in various mythologies, especially within the Indo-European mythology family. Unlike the typical English notion of giants as gigantic humans, "giants" in Greek mythology are not merely oversized humanoid figures but monstrous beings embodying chaos and disorder. Giants are usually depicted as beings with human appearance, but of prodigious size (though not always so) and great strength common in the mythology and legends of many different cultures.

In various Indo-European mythologies, a group of anti-gods are usually featured as primeval, even malevolent beings associated with chaos, evil, and the wild nature. These are frequently portrayed as enemies of the gods, be they Greek (Giants), Celtic (Fomorians), Hindu (Asuras), Norse (Jötnar) or Persian (Daevas).

The Mesopotamian myth of The Enuma Elish describes the conflict between the gods led by Marduk and the chaotic sea goddess Tiamat, who is often represented with monstrous forms. In Egyptian mythology, Ra's nightly journey through the underworld involves a fierce struggle against Apep, the serpent of chaos, whose attempts to devour the sun god represent the ongoing battle between order and disorder.

Giants also often play similar roles in the mythologies and folklore of other, non Indo-European peoples, such as in the Nartian traditions, along with the Quinametzin of Aztec mythology.

In Chinese mythology, the Battle of Zhuolu was a decisive clash between the Yellow Emperor Huangdi and the tribal leader Chiyou, usually considered a demon god, marking the establishment of a unified Chinese state.

In Japanese mythology, the conflict between gods and evil forces is highlighted by Izanagi’s struggle against the malevolent goddess Izanami in the underworld, culminating in his escape and the birth of Amaterasu, the sun goddess, who symbolizes the restoration of cosmic order.

In Abrahamic traditions, the War in Heaven refers to the celestial conflict described in Christian and Islamic texts, where the archangel Michael leads the faithful angels in a rebellion against Satan and his followers, who sought to overthrow God's divine authority. This epic battle, depicted in Revelation 12:7-9 and alluded to in Islamic tradition, results in the expulsion of Satan and his demons from Heaven, reinforcing the ultimate triumph of divine order over chaos and evil.

There are also accounts of giants in the Hebrew Bible. Some of these are called Nephilim, a word often translated as giant although this translation is not universally accepted. They include Og King of Bashan, the Nephilim, the Anakim, and the giants of Egypt mentioned in 1 Chronicles 11:23. The first mention of the Nephilim is found in Genesis 6:4; attributed to them are extraordinary strength and physical proportions. Further, Goliath was a Philistine giant in the Book of Samuel. Descriptions of Goliath's immense stature vary among biblical sources, with various texts describing him as either 6 ft 9 in (2.06 m) or 9 ft 9 in (2.97 m) tall.

=== Dragons and serpents ===
Usually large to gigantic, serpent-like legendary creatures that appear in the folklore of many cultures around the world. Beliefs about dragons vary drastically by region, but dragons in western cultures since the High Middle Ages have often been depicted as winged, horned, four-legged, and capable of breathing fire, whereas dragons in eastern cultures are usually depicted as wingless, four-legged, serpentine creatures with above-average intelligence.

==== Chaoskampf ====
One on one epic battles between these beasts are noted throughout many cultures. Typically they consist of a hero or god battling a single to polycephalic dragon. The motif of Chaoskampf (German: [ˈkaːɔsˌkampf]; lit. 'struggle against chaos') is ubiquitous in myth and legend, depicting a battle of a culture hero deity with a chaos monster, often in the shape of a sea serpent or dragon. A few notable examples include: Zeus vs. Typhon and Hercules vs. the Lernaean Hydra, both of which are from Greek mythology, Thor vs. Jörmungandr of Norse mythology, Indra vs. Vritra of Indian mythology, Ra vs. Apep of Egyptian mythology, Yahweh vs. Leviathan of Judeo-Christian mythology, and Yu the Great vs. Xiangliu of Chinese mythology. Many other examples exist worldwide.

==== Ouroboros ====
Originating in ancient Egyptian iconography, the Ouroboros or uroborus is an ancient symbol depicting a serpent or dragon eating its own tail. The Ouroboros entered western tradition via Greek magical tradition.

In Norse mythology, the Ouroboros appears as the serpent Jörmungandr, one of the three children of Loki and Angrboda, which grew so large that it could encircle the world and grasp its tail in its teeth.

In the Aitareya Brahmana, a Vedic text of the early 1st millennium BCE, the nature of the Vedic rituals is compared to "a snake biting its own tail."

It is a common belief among indigenous people of the tropical lowlands of South America that waters at the edge of the world-disc are encircled by a snake, often an anaconda, biting its own tail.

=== Founding myths ===
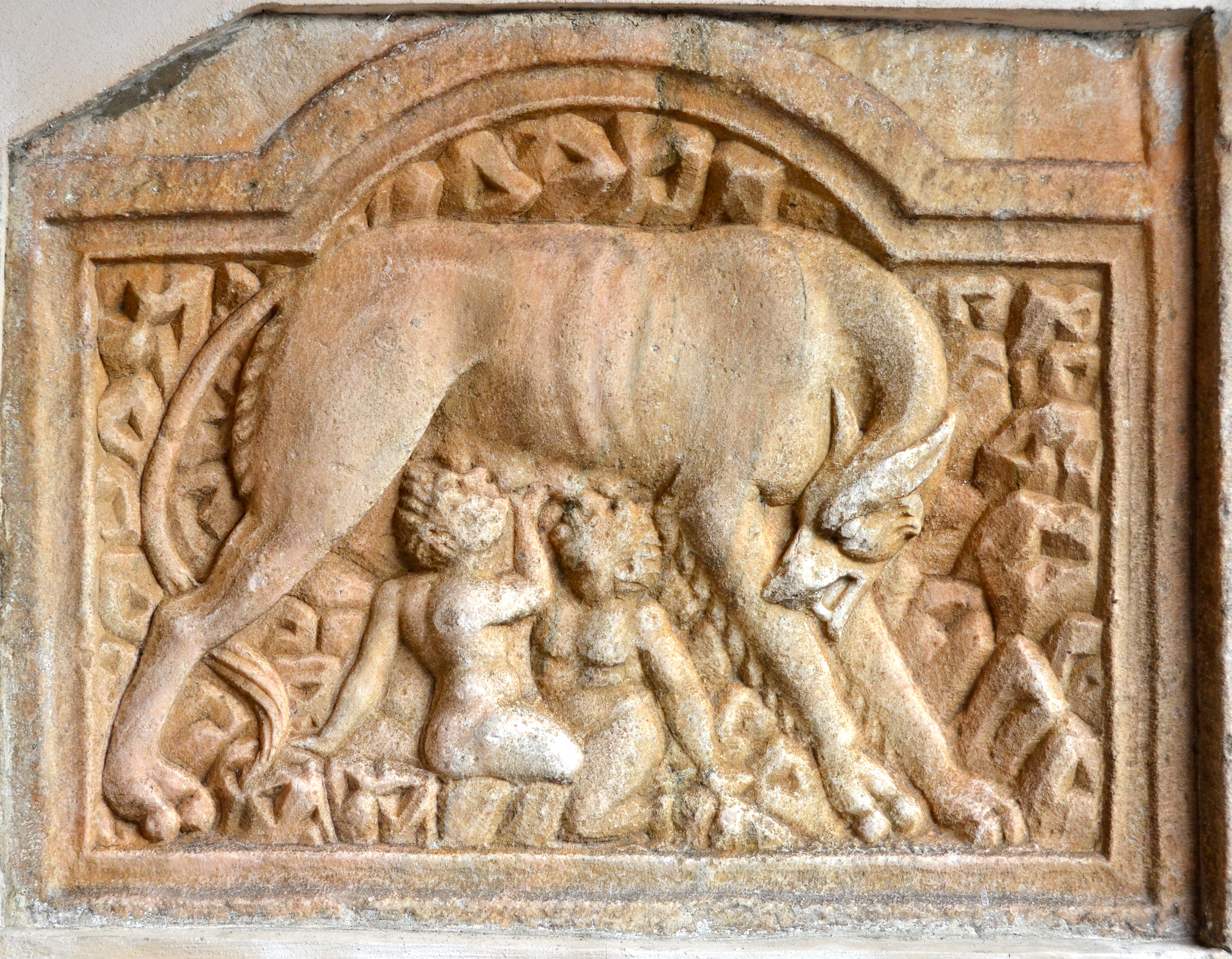
Ancient Roman relief from the Cathedral of Maria Saal showing the infant twins Romulus and Remus being suckled by a she-wolf

Many cultures have myths describing the origin of their customs, rituals, and identity. In fact, ancient and traditional societies have often justified their customs by claiming that their gods or mythical heroes established those customs. For example, according to the myths of the Australian Karajarri, the mythical Bagadjimbiri brothers established all of the Karadjeri's customs, including the position in which they stand while urinating. In the Old Testament, the Israelites have a founding myth of their ancestors escaping enslavement from Egypt.

=== Structure of hero narratives ===
Folklorists such as Antti Aarne (Aarne-Thompson classification systems), Joseph Campbell (monomyth) and Georges Polti (The Thirty-Six Dramatic Situations) have created structured reference systems to identify connections between myths from different cultures and regions. Some comparative mythologists look for similarities only among hero stories within a specific geographical or ethnic range. For example, the Austrian scholar Johann Georg von Hahn tried to identify a common structure underlying Aryan hero stories.

=== Human cannibalism ===
Human cannibalism features in the myths, folklore, and legends of many cultures and is most often attributed to evil characters or as extreme retribution for some wrongdoing. Examples include Lamia of Greek mythology, a woman who became a child-eating monster after her children were destroyed by Hera, upon learning of her husband Zeus' trysts. In Zuni mythology and religion, Átahsaia is a giant cannibalistic demon, feeding on fellow demons and humans alike. He is depicted as having unblinking bulging eyes, long talons, and yellow tusks that protruded past his lips. The myth of Baxbaxwalanuksiwe, in Hamatsa society of the Kwakwaka'wakw indigenous tribe, tells of a man-eating giant, who lives in a strange house with red smoke emanating from its roof.

=== Astrological traditions, types, and systems ===
Most human civilizations - India, China, Egypt, Mesopotamia, Maya, and Inca, among others - based their culture on complex systems of astrology, which provided a link between the cosmos with the conditions and events on earth. For these, the astrological practice was not mere divination because it also served as the foundation for their spiritual culture and knowledge-systems used for practical purposes such as the calendar (see Mesoamerican calendric shamans) and medicine (e.g. I Ching).

Closely tying in with Astrology, various zodiac systems and constellations have existed since antiquity. For the zodiac, the Mazzaroth, Chinese Zodiac, Hindu Zodiac and Dendera zodiac (Egyptian) are examples. The origins of the earliest constellations likely go back to prehistory. People used them to relate stories of their beliefs, experiences, creation, or mythology. Different cultures and countries adopted their own constellations, some of which lasted into the early 20th century before today's constellations were internationally recognized.

=== Orbis Alius (other earth/world) ===
The concept of an otherworld in historical Indo-European religion is reconstructed in comparative mythology. Its name is a calque of orbis alius (Latin for "other Earth/world"), a term used by Lucan in his description of the Celtic Otherworld.

Comparable religious, mythological or metaphysical concepts, such as a realm of supernatural beings and a realm of the dead, are found in cultures throughout the world. Spirits are thought to travel between worlds, or layers of existence in such traditions, usually along an axis such as a giant tree, a tent pole, a river, a rope or mountains. In Greek mythology, after death, people either go to Tartarus or Elysium while the Norse believed in going to either Valhalla, Folkvangr, or Helheim.

==== Underworld ====
The underworld is the supernatural world of the dead in various religious traditions and myths, located below the world of the living. Chthonic is the technical adjective for things of the underworld.

The concept of an underworld is found in almost every civilization and "may be as old as humanity itself". Common features of underworld myths are accounts of living people making journeys to the underworld, often for some heroic purpose. Other myths reinforce traditions that entrance of souls to the underworld requires a proper observation of ceremony, such as the ancient Greek story of the recently dead Patroclus haunting Achilles until his body could be properly buried for this purpose. Persons having social status were dressed and equipped in order to better navigate the underworld.

==== Plane (esotericism) ====
In esoteric cosmology, a plane is conceived as a subtle state, level, or region of reality, each plane corresponding to some type, kind, or category of being. Also known as a plane or realm of existence.

The concept may be found in religious and esoteric teachings—e.g. Vedanta (Advaita Vedanta), Ayyavazhi, shamanism, Hermeticism, Neoplatonism, Gnosticism, Kashmir Shaivism, Sant Mat/Surat Shabd Yoga, Sufism, Druze, Kabbalah, Theosophy, Anthroposophy, Rosicrucianism (Esoteric Christian), Eckankar, Ascended Master Teachings, etc.—which propound the idea of a whole series of subtle planes or worlds or dimensions which, from a center, interpenetrate themselves and the physical planet in which we live, the solar systems, and all the physical structures of the universe. This interpenetration of planes culminates in the universe itself as a physical structured, dynamic and evolutive expression emanated through a series of steadily denser stages, becoming progressively more material and embodied.

Norse cosmology encompasses concepts from Norse mythology, such as notions of time and space, cosmogony, personifications, anthropogeny, and eschatology. Topics include Yggdrasil, an immense and central sacred tree along with the nine worlds, including Asgard, Jötunheimr and Midgard to name a few.

The happy hunting ground is a concept of the afterlife associated with Native Americans in the United States. The phrase possibly originated with Anglo-Saxon settlers interpretation of their respective description.

==== Afterlife (including Reincarnation) ====
In numerous mythologies and religions, and thus tying within the Orbis Alius motif proper is the concept of an afterlife, wherein a purported existence by which the essential part of an individual's identity or their stream of consciousness continues to exist after the death of their physical body.

=== End of The World ===
Many myths mention an "End of the world (civilization)" event, wherein a final battle between good and evil takes place to create a new world, and/or a total cataclysmic event will usher an end to humanity (see Extinction event, aka ELE). Ragnarök shows the end of the world in Norse mythology. In Hindu mythology, the end of the Kali yug predicts the end of the world when the final avatar of Vishnu comes to cleanse the Earth. Armageddon, the site of the final battle as accorded by the Book of Revelation.

The 2012 phenomenon was a range of eschatological beliefs that cataclysmic or transformative events would occur on or around 21 December 2012, pursuant to the end-date of a 5,126-year-long cycle in the Mesoamerican Long Count calendar (aka Mayan calendar).

== See also ==
- Comparative religion
- Comparative cultural studies
- Development of religion
- Georges Dumezil
- Hamlet's Mill
- Carl Jung
- Eliphas Lévi
- Claude Lévi-Strauss
- Joseph Campbell
- Motif-Index of Folk-Literature
- Myth and ritual
- Mythography
- Mythologies of the indigenous peoples of the Americas
- Helena Blavatsky
- Marcel Griaule, Jean Rouch and Germaine Dieterlen
- Abram Smythe Palmer
- Panbabylonism
- Parallelomania and parallelophobia
- Religious pluralism
- Structuralism
- Samael Aun Weor

Specific motifs:

- Aegis
- Cosmic Hunt
- Cosmic Man
- Earth diver
- Golden Rule
- Hero's journey
- Miraculous births
- Multiple suns
- Mother goddess
- Pleiades
- Swan maiden
- Theft of fire
- Three-legged crow
- World tree

== Sources ==
- Alcock, John P. (2007). "The Egg: its Symbolism and Mythology". In Hosking, Richard (ed.). Eggs in Cookery: Proceedings of the Oxford Symposium of Food and Cookery 2006. Prospect Books. pp. 20–29.
- Brewer, E. Cobham (1894). "Mundane Egg". Dictionary of Phrase and Fable.
- Decharneux, Julien (2023). Creation and Contemplation The Cosmology of the Qur'ān and Its Late Antique Background. De Gruyter.
- Dimmitt, Cornelia, and J. van Buitenen, eds. and trans. Classical Hindu Mythology. Philadelphia: Temple University Press, 1978.
- Eliade, Mircea
  - Cosmos and History: The Myth of the Eternal Return. NY: Harper & Row, 1959.
  - Images and Symbols. Trans. Philip Mairet. Princeton: Princeton University Press, 1991.
  - Myth and Reality. Trans. Willard Trask. NY: Harper & Row, 1963.
  - Myths, Dreams and Mysteries. Trans. Philip Mairet. NY: Harper & Row, 1967.
  - Shamanism: Archaic Techniques of Ecstasy. Princeton University Press: Princeton, 2004.
- Frankfort, Henri. "The Dying God". Journal of the Warburg and Courtauld Institutes 21.3–4(1958): 141–51.
- Graves, Robert. "Jungian Mythology". The Hudson Review 5.2(1952): 245–57.
- Hesiod. Works and Days and Theogony. Trans. Stanley Lombardo. Indianapolis: Hackett Publishing Company, 1993.
- d'Huy, Julien
  - "Mythes, langues et génétique". Mythologie Française, 247, 2012a: 25–26.
  - "Un ours dans les étoiles: recherche phylogénétique sur un mythe préhistorique". Préhistoire du Sud-Ouest, 20 (1), 2012b: 91–106.
  - "Le motif de Pygmalion : origine afrasienne et diffusion en Afrique". Sahara, 23, 2012c: 49–59 .
  - "Polyphemus (Aa. Th. 1137). "A phylogenetic reconstruction of a prehistoric tale". Nouvelle Mythologie Comparée / New Comparative Mythology 1, 2013a
  - "A phylogenetic approach of mythology and its archaeological consequences". Rock Art Research, 30(1), 2013b: 115–118.
  - "Les mythes évolueraient par ponctuations". Mythologie française, 252, 2013c: 8–12.
  - "A Cosmic Hunt in the Berber sky : a phylogenetic reconstruction of Palaeolithic mythology". Les Cahiers de l'AARS, 15, 2013d: 93–106.
- Johnson, Allen, and Douglass Price-Williams. Oedipus Ubiquitous: The Family Complex in World Literature. Stanford: Stanford University Press, 1996.
- Justin Martyr. The First Apology. Trans. Marcus Dods and George Reith. Church Fathers. New Advent. 23 June 2008 newadvent.org
- Lebling, Robert (2010). Legends of the Fire Spirits: Jinn and genies from Arabia to Zanzibar. New York, NY & London, UK: I.B. Tauris. ISBN 978-0-85773-063-3.
- Leonard, Scott. "The History of Mythology: Part I". Youngstown State University. 22 June 2008 as.ysu.edu
- Leslau, Charlotte and Wolf Leslau. "The Creation of the World A Myth of Uganda". Copyediting-L. 2008. Indiana University. 21 June 2008 copyediting-1.info
- Lévi-Strauss, Claude. Structural Anthropology. Trans. Claire Jacobson. New York: Basic Books, 1963.
- Littleton, C. The New Comparative Mythology: An Anthropological Assessment of the Theories of Georges Dumezil. Berkeley: University of California Press, 1973.
- McGinn, Bernard. Antichrist: Two Thousand Years of the Human Fascination with Evil. NY: HarperCollins, 1994.
- Northup, Lesley. "Myth-Placed Priorities: Religion and the Study of Myth". Religious Studies Review 32.1(2006): 5–10.
- Propp, Vladimir. The Morphology of the Folktale.Trans. Laurence Scott. Texas: University of Texas Press, 1968.
- Railsback, Bruce. "Pan Gu and Nü Wa". Creation Stories from around the World. July 2000. University of Georgia. 21 June 2008 gly.uga.edu
- Robertson, John. Pagan Christs. London: Watts & Co., 1911.
- Ross, Robert M., Greenhill, Simon J., Atkinson, Quentin D. "Population structure and cultural geography of a folktale in Europe". Proceedings of the Royal Society B. Biological Sciences, vol. 280 no. 1756, 2013.
- Segal, Robert A.
  - Hero Myths: A Reader. Blackwell Publishing, 2000.
  - Theorizing About Myth. Massachusetts: University of Massachusetts Press, 1999.
  - "The Romantic Appeal of Joseph Campbell". Religion Online. 22 June 2008 religion-online.org
  - Untitled book review. History of Religions 32.1(1992): 88–90.
- Sinai, Nicolai (2023). Key Terms of the Qur'an: A Critical Dictionary. Princeton University Press.
- Squire, Charles. Celtic Myth and Legend. London: Gresham, 1905.
- Taylor, Archer. "The Biographical Pattern in Traditional Narrative". Journal of the Folklore Institute 1.1–2(1964): 114–29.
- Tehrani, Jamshid J., "The Phylogeny of Little Red Riding Hood", PlosOne, November 13, 2013.
- Tortchinov, Evgueni. "Cybele, Attis, and the Mysteries of the 'Suffering Gods': A Transpersonalistic Interpretation". The International Journal of Transpersonal Studies 17.2(1998): 149–59.
- Urton, Gary. Inca Myths: The Legendary Past. Texas: University of Texas Press, 1999.
- Watkins, Calvert. "Indo-European and Indo-Europeans". The American Heritage Dictionary of the English Language. 4th ed. 2000. Bartleby.com. 21 June 2008 bartleby.com
- Witzel, E.J. Michael (2012). The Origin of the World's Mythologies. Oxford University Press.
- Woolley, Leonard. "The Flood". The South African Archaeological Bulletin 8.30(1953): 52–54.

== Selected bibliography ==
- Arvidsson, Stefan, Aryan Idols. Indo-European Mythology as Science and Ideology. 2006. University of Chicago Press.
- Clifton, Dan Salahuddin, The Myth Of The Western Magical Tradition. 1998. C&GCHE
- Dickson, K. "Bibliography-in-Progress of Texts on Myths & Comparative Mythology". 11/12/09. Purdue University. 17 December 2009 web.ics.purdue.edu
- Doniger, Wendy, The Implied Spider: Politics and Theology in Myth. 1998. New York: Columbia University Press [An introduction to comparative mythology]
- Doniger, Wendy, Splitting the Difference: Gender and Myth in Ancient Greece and India (Jordan Lectures in Comparative Religion, 1996–1997: School of Oriental and African Studies University of London). 1999. Chicago: University of Chicago Press
- Dumezil, Georges, The Destiny of the Warrior. 1983. Berkeley: University of California Press
- Dumezil, Georges, The Plight of a Sorcerer. 1986. Berkeley: University of California Press
- Dumezil, Georges, Mitra-Varuna: An Essay on Two Indo-European Representations of Sovereignty. 1988. New York:Zone Books
- Friedrich, Paul, The Meaning of Aphrodite. 1978. Chicago: University of Chicago Press
- Girard, René, Violence and the Sacred. 1977. Baltimore: Johns Hopkins University Press.
- Hatt, Gudmund. Asiatic Influences in American Folklore. København: i kommission Hos Ejnar Munksgaard. 1949.
- Jamison, Stephanie, The Ravenous Hyenas and the Wounded Sun: Myth and Ritual in Ancient India . 1991. Ithaca: Cornell University Press
- Jamison, Stephanie, Sacrificed Wife / Sacrificer's Wife: Women, Ritual and Hospitality in Ancient India. 1996. New York: Oxford University Press
- Lévi-Strauss, Claude Myth and Meaning. 1995. New York: Schocken Books
- Lévi-Strauss, Claude, The Raw and the Cooked (Mythologiques Volume One). 1990. Chicago: University of Chicago Press
- Lévi-Strauss, Claude, From Honey to Ashes (Mythologiques Volume Two). 1973. New York: Harper and Row
- Lévi-Strauss, Claude, The Origin of Table-Manners (Mythologiques Volume Three). 1978. New York: Harper and Row
- Lévi-Strauss, Claude, The Naked Man (Mythologiques Volume Four). 1990. Chicago: University of Chicago Press
- Lincoln, Bruce Theorizing Myth: Narrative, Ideology, and Scholarship. 1999. University of Chicago Press.
- Patton, Laurie; Doniger, Wendy (eds.), Myth and Method (Studies in Religion and Culture). 1996. Charlottesville: University Press of Virginia
- Puhvel, Jaan, Comparative Mythology. 1987. Baltimore: Johns Hopkins University Press
- Tátar, Maria M. "Mythology as an areal problem in the Altai-Sayan area: the sacred holes and caves". In: Shamanism and Northern Ecology. Edited by Juha Pentikäinen. Berlin, New York: De Gruyter, 1996. pp. 267–278. https://doi.org/10.1515/9783110811674.267
- White, David Gordon, Doniger, Wendy, Myths of the Dog-Man. 1991. Chicago: University of Chicago Press
- Witzel, Michael, The Origins of the World's Mythologies. 2010. New York: Oxford University Press
- Wise, R. Todd, A Neocomparative Examination of the Orpheus Myth As Found in the Native American and European Traditions, 1998. UMI.

Journals about comparative mythology:

- Comparative Mythology,
- New Comparative Mythology / Nouvelle Mythologie Comparée, http://nouvellemythologiecomparee.hautetfort.com
- Ollodagos, https://web.archive.org/web/20160206045638/http://www.sbec.be/index.php/publications/ollodagos
- Studia Mythologica Slavica, http://sms.zrc-sazu.si
- Mythological Studies Journal, https://web.archive.org/web/20160303175646/http://journals.sfu.ca/pgi/index.php/pacificamyth/index
- The Journal of Germanic Mythology and Folklore, https://web.archive.org/web/20140630101827/http://www.jgmf.org/
