= Aihayuta =

Zuñi mythology twin-brother heroes

In Zuñi mythology, the Aihayuta are a 2nd pair of twin-brother heroes who complement the 1st set of twin-brother heroes, the Ahayuta.

== In literature ==
- "Parsons uses Aihayuta to refer to the second pair of Twins who were generated at Hanlhibinkya while the people were searching for the Center Place."
- "Bunzel (1932 : 597) states that the second pair ... were generated by a waterfall at Hanlhibinkya."
- "D. Tedlock (1972 : 225–69) gives the names Uyuyuwi and Ma’asewi to the pair of Twins who were created while the people were searching for the Center Place".
