= Wurrunna =

Australian Aboriginal mythological hero

In Gamilaraay mythology, Wurrunna (also Wurrunnah) is a culture hero.

The Dreamtime story of the black swans tells how two brothers were turned into white swans so they could help an attack party during a raid for weapons. Wurrunna used a large gubbera, or crystal stone, to transform the men. After the raid, eaglehawks attacked the white swans and tore feathers from the birds. Crows who were enemies of the eaglehawks came to the aid of the brothers and gave the black swans their own black feathers. The black swan's red beak is said to be the blood of the attacked brothers, which stayed there forever.
