= Achiyalatopa =

Brird demon in Zuni mythology

Achiyalatopa is a figure in Zuni mythology. Achiyalatopa has celestial powers, and possesses wings and a tail made of flint knives, which it throws at objects. It is said to have taught the art of sword swallowing to two chief officers from the Hle'wekwe Fraternity.
