= Iʼwai =

In Australian Aboriginal mythology, Iʼwai is the culture hero of the Koko Yaʼo. Iʼwai was a crocodilian man who brought most of the Koko Yaʼo religious rites and ceremonies.
