= Apanuugak =

Hero of Inuit legends

In Inuit mythology, Apanuugak is a culture hero who was sometimes depicted as an error-prone warrior who lives to old age and sometimes as a dastardly villain.
