= Kyanakwe =

Part of Zuñi mythology

The Kyanakwe are, according to Claude Lévi-Strauss, a "population" against whom in Zuñi mythology the ancestors of the Zuñi engaged in war. Peace was not an option; the gods would grant final victory to one group alone. The Kyanakwe are described variously as hunters and as gardeners.

The Kyanakwe Dance commemorates the early Zuñi looking for the Middle Place and encountering the Kyanakwe, who lived in large houses, wore long white robes, farmed large fields of corn and other crops, and were led by Chakwaina Okya, a large woman warrior. The Zuñi fought them for four days before the Kyanakwe were routed. The dance occurs every four years and when led by Kyamosona, they bring quantities of food.
