= Atonga =

In Polynesian mythology (specifically: Samoa), Atonga is a culture hero, half-mortal and half-spirit. He built the first canoe on Savaii with his brothers Olokeu and Olo-i-nano, then had it transported to Upolu by birds.
