= Zuni fetishes =

Small carved objects made by Zuni people

Wolf fetish with medicine bundle and heartline carved by Stuart Lasiloo; jet, turquoise, coral, shell heshi; 2" L x 1.25" H x .5" W

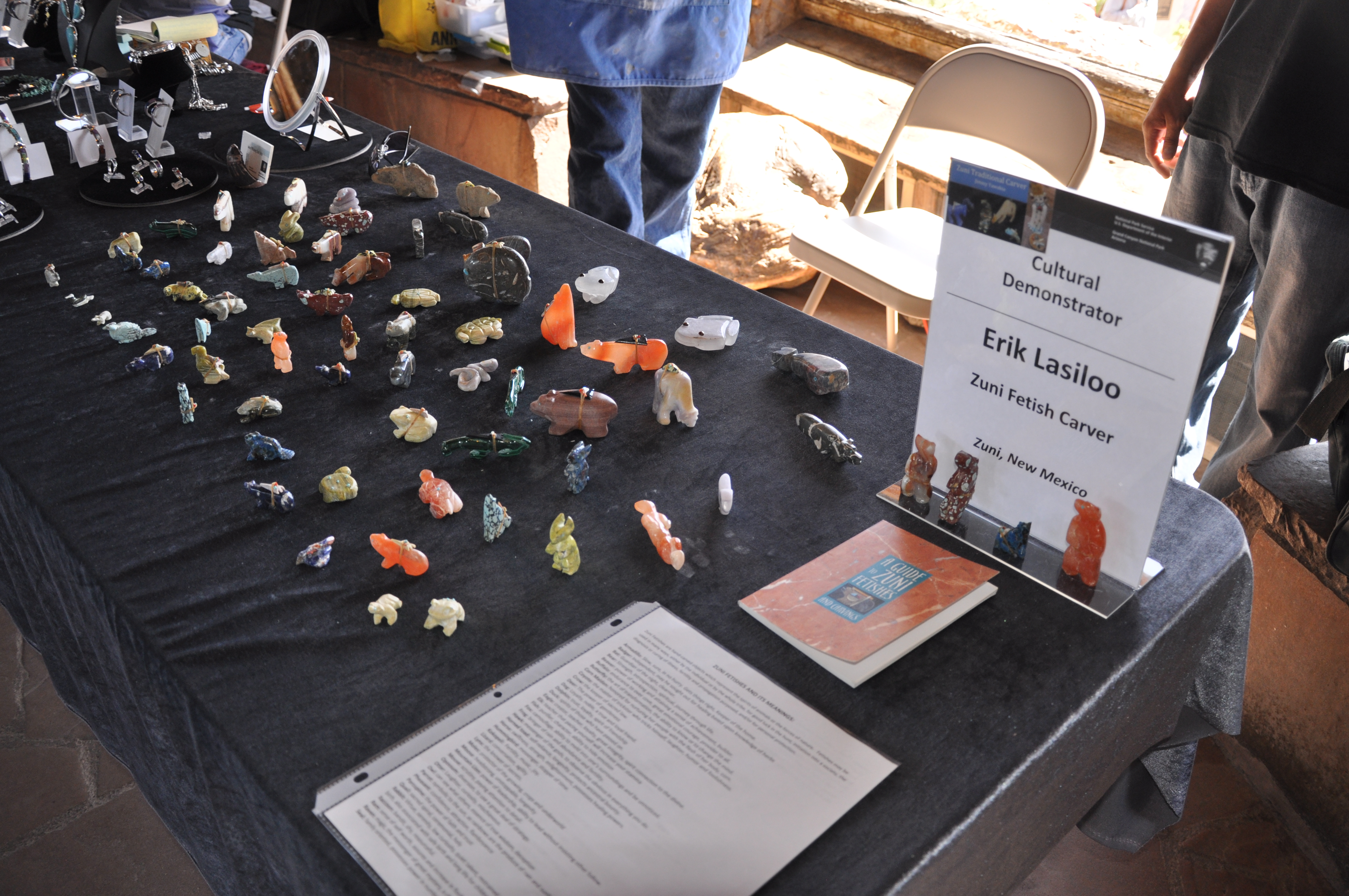
A grouping of hand-carved Zuni fetish objects by the Zuni artist Erik Lasiloo

Zuni fetishes are small carvings made from primarily stone but also shell, fossils, and other materials by the Zuni people. Within the Zuni community, these carvings serve ceremonial purposes for their creators and depict animals and icons integral to their culture. As a form of contemporary Native American art, they are sold with secular intentions to collectors worldwide. Prior to the establishment of a non-Native market for fetishes, Hopi, Navajo, and other Pueblo peoples, especially at Kewa Pueblo also carved and used fetishes.

== Directions and typology ==
The primary non-Native source for academic information on Zuni fetishes is the Second Annual Report of the Bureau of Ethnology submitted in 1881 by Frank Hamilton Cushing and posthumously published as Zuni Fetishes in 1966, with several later reprints. Cushing reports that the Zuni divided the world into six regions or directions: north, west, south, east, above, and below. At the center of each region is a great mountain peak that is a very sacred place. Yellow mountain to the north, blue mountain to the west, red mountain to the south, white mountain to the east, the multicolored mountain above, and the black mountain below.

Each direction is represented by a Prey God, or guardian animal, and are listed by Cushing as follows:

- north: yellow mountain lion
- west: black bear (represented by the color blue),
- south: red badger,
- east: white wolf,
- above or the sky: multicolored eagle,
- below or underground: black shrew (often misnamed "mole," but moles do not live in the Southwest).

Each prey god is the “guardian and master” of their region, with the yellow mountain lion being the elder brother of all animals and the master and guardian of all regions. Each one of these regions contains an order of all the guardian animals, but the "guardian and master" of a particular region is the elder brother to all animals of that region. These guardians are considered as having protective and healing powers. They are held by the priests of the medicine orders as if "in captivity" and act as mediators between the priests and the animals they represent.

A second group of fetishes, the Prey Gods of the Hunt, belonging to the Hunter Order, or Society, are given in the “prayer songs of the Sa-ni-a-kia-kwe”. These guardian animals are the same as the original regions with the exception of the coyote, which replaces the bear; and the wildcat (or bobcat), which replaces the red badger. Sa-ni-a-kia is the awakening of the fetish and subsequently the power of the hunter.

In addition to the animals mentioned above, typical Zuni fetishes depict animals such as the wolf, badger, bear, mountain lion, eagle, mole, frog, deer, ram, and others. Contemporary carvers many produce images of exotic subjects – dinosaurs, for example – or some insects and reptiles that are customary but more integral to petroglyphs, symbolism, and the patterns of design in pottery – dragonflies, butterflies, water spiders, and lizards for example. Other animals, such as the horse, were carved in the past mainly for trade. The Zuni was not a horse culture, but their horse carvings were considered by the horse cultures to the north as having great power for the protection of their herds.

== Materials ==
Zuni fetish necklace made with multiple materials

Historical, carvers used locally sourced materials or item procured by trade or pilgrimages. The most important of these materials was turquoise which the Zuni regard as the sacred stone. Jet, shell (primarily mother-of-pearl), and coral are also frequently used. These materials and their associated colors are principle in the Zuni sunface, a cultural symbol which is present in Zuni jewelry and fetishes and represents their Sun Father. Other materials used are travertine or "Zuni rock", fishrock, jasper, pipestone, marble, or organic items such as fossilized ivory, bone, and deer or elk antler. Even artificial substances such as slag glass are used. But historically the most-used stone has been serpentine, a local soft stone found abundantly in the Zuni Mountains and also in Arizona. In recent years Zuni carvings, or fetishes, have become popular collectibles and Zuni artisans have familiarized themselves with materials available from all parts of the world in order to serve the aesthetic tastes of collectors.

== Sacredness ==
In Zuni cosmology and those of neighboring tribes, each animal is believed to have inherent powers or qualities that may aid the owner. The Navajo, for example, treasured and bartered for figures of horses, sheep, cattle or goats to protect their herd from disease and to ensure fertility. The Zuni hunter, or "Prey brother," was required to have his fetishes (prey gods of the hunt) with a "Keeper" and practice a ceremony of worship when procuring a favorite or proper fetish to aid in a successful hunt. In the ceremony of the hunt the Keeper presented a clay pot containing the fetishes to the hunter. Facing in the direction appropriate to the chosen fetish the pot was sprinkled with medicine meal and a prayer was recited. The fetish was placed in a buckskin bag and carried by the hunter over his heart. The fetish aids in the chase and represents "the roar of the animal" and is also fed on the blood of the slain prey.

In addition to the Prey Gods of the Six Regions with their guardian and medicinal powers, and the Prey Gods of the Hunt that aid in the chase, Cushing names three Prey Gods of the Priesthood of the Bow, a society of which he was a member, that aid a Priest of the Bow when traveling in a region where he may be captured by the enemy. These are the mountain lion and great white bear, which belong to the "skies", as well as a prey god of human form adorned with "flint knife-feather pinions and tail". An arrowhead, "emblematic of Sa-wa-ni-kia", or the "medicine of war", on the back or side of either of these animals prevented a warrior from being taken by surprise by his enemy, and an arrowhead on the belly or feet erased the tracks of the carrier so that they could not be followed by the enemy. Unlike the Prey Gods of the Hunt these fetishes were never deposited with a keeper, but like the Prey Gods of the Hunt they were fed on the blood of the slain and their ceremony involved depositing sacred flour to the four directions and reciting a prayer, and like the Prey Gods of the Six Regions they were protective of the carrier.

On the subject of feeding, within Zuni culture it is believes fetishes require periodic meals of cornmeal and ground turquoise. Fetishes may be kept in a clay pot as it is the tradition, although collectors usually like to keep theirs somewhere where they can be admired. Any but the very delicate fetishes could be carried by the owner in a pocket, pouch or bag.

While the Zuni fetish carvings available for sale online are considered "Zuni fetishes," carved by a variety of well-known Zuni carvers, true Zuni fetishes are blessed by a spiritual leader, although non-blessed ones may still be considered to have a life of their own.

== Religion as art ==
The artist's styles are as unique as the artists themselves, and there are many whose works are highly sought after by collectors. Some collectors prefer a figure that is more realistic in appearance, while others prefer the more classical styles that are intrinsic to Zuni belief. The customary Zuni perspective is that the least modification of the original material maintains, or heightens, the power of the fetish as a "natural concretion." Some carvers prefer the term "carvings" rather than the term "fetishes" when referring to offerings for collectors.

A fetish may be signed by the carver, or not. Personalization by signing a piece of art violates the historic Zuni notion of community purpose, and the signing of artwork is a concept introduced to the Zuni by Anglo collectors at the beginning of the 20th century (c. 1915). Often, though, a Zuni carver feels that their own unique style is readily identifiable and the fetish's style will be enough to identify the carver as surely as would any other mark. Most carvers are the recipients of a family practice and have learned their skill from parents, grand parents, or siblings, and have passed the art to their own children as well.

Besides being made from various stones and other materials (each material has unique properties), the contemporary fetish may carry an offering of a smaller animal or a prayer bundle (or medicine bundle) of carved arrowheads with small beads of heishe. It may be adorned with a heishe necklace, feathers, etchings representing ancient petroglyphs, or an etched or inlaid "heartline". These small items, although colorful to the eye, are intended to protect and feed the fetish itself. The "heartline" takes the shape of an arrow or line that is either carved and inlaid with a contrasting colored stone, or carved and painted. It symbolizes the breath leading from the mouth to the heart of the carved (host) animal to the animal that is its prey. The medicine bundle represents and offering of empowerment. According to Rodee and Ostler, Zuni fetishes with a heartline (sometimes called a breath line) were rarely found on older fetishes and became more popular in the 20th century.

Traditionally, they are given "ceremonial feedings" by sprinkling a bit of ground blue corn meal and pulverized turquoise. The time of day the fetish is fed, as well as how often it is fed varies from one person to another. If the fetish is communally owned (for example by a clan), they are usually kept in a ceramic vessel such as a "fetish pot", a bowl or an olla (water storage jar). These vessels generally have a small hole in them which serves as a means of entry for the ceremonial food.

== Development of a market economy for Zuni fetishes ==
Historically, fetishes were carried in pouches or worn (as in a fetish necklace). Fetish necklaces can be single stranded or have multiple strands. It is believed that each carved animal depicted in the necklace has a spirit that resides within it. With the emergence of Zuni jewelry created for sale or trade in the 20th century, in particular in the 1960s and 1970s, a more realistic carving style developed. Forerunners in this newer style include members of the Leekya and Leekya-Deyuse families who are known for their bird fetish necklaces. Often the heshi (beads) were made by artisans at the neighboring Santo Domingo (Kewa) Pueblo up the Rio Grande Valley. Prior to the 1960s these necklaces were not sold or traded outside of the culture.

== 20th and 21st century Zuni fetish carver families ==
Zuni carvers tend to run in families. A family member may be adopted by a member of another clan or a relative, therefore the last names may differ and family trees do not necessarily follow "strict bloodlines." The list is as follows:

- Gary Acque family
- Kent and Terry Banteah family
- Bica and Kalestewa families
- Rickson Kalestewa family
- Wilfred and Faylena Cachini family
- Cheama family
- Emery and Daisy Eriacho family
- Georgee Haloo Cheechee family
- Leonard Halate family
- Herbert Halate family
- Haloo family
- Herbert Hustito family
- Hustito and Lowsayatee families
- Theodore Kucate family
- Laate family
- Lasiloo family
- Leekya family also known as the Leekya Deyuse family
- Lunacee, Tsethlikai and Chavez families
- Mahooty, Lasiloo and Laiwakete families
- Ulysses Mahkee family
- Verna Noche family
- Peina family
- Sepo Ponchuella family
- Poncho family
- Quam family
- Andres and Jewelita Quam family
- Andrew Emerson Quam and Bossie Quam families
- Johnny Quam and Westika families
- Natewa, Dallas Quam and Panteah extended families
- Tyler Quam family
- Rhoda Quam family
- Quandelacy family
- Melvin Sandoval family
- Sheche family
- Annette Tsikewa and Eddington Hannaweeke family
- Weahkee family
- Saul Yuselew family
- Othole extended family

== See also ==
- Zuni mythology
