= Awonawilona =

In the myths of the Pueblo Zuni people of New Mexico, Awonawilona is known as the "Supreme life-giving power" and the creator of all with a name translating to "All Container". The deity's gender is not specified in myth and referred to as either he or she. In the beginning, Awonawilona created and became all configurations of water in the world; as a result fog, clouds, large bodies of water, and air were formed. In other versions, fog and steam were already existent before Awonawilona. The new combination of light, clouds, and air allowed for vegetation and made Awonawilona the "essence" of life as they created the universe. The universe was made up of 9 layers: the first layer was the earth and the other 8 were homes for various animals, birds, and trees.

Eventually Awonawilona chose to embody the sun and created the deity the Sun-father, which lead to the formation of several other gods such as Awitelin Tsita (The Four-Fold Containing Mother Earth), and Apoyan Tachu (All Covering Father-sky) from green scum formed over the waters. As the myth unfolds, the deities created by Awonawilona leads to the creation of humans and all living creatures.

Like all mythologies, there are many different versions of the Zuni creation story. In one version, the creature Poshaiyankya escapes from the four-fold womb of Awitelin Tsita and convinces the Sun father, Awonawilona, to send the Ahayuta, the twin gods of war, to bring the rest of womb dwellers into the light. Other versions of the myth say that Awonawilona sent the twin gods of war to bring forth people that would give him offerings and prayers.
