= Mātariśvan =

Rigvedic fire deity

Mātariśvan ("growing in the mother", from the locative of "mother", mātari, and a root śvi "to grow, swell") in the Rigveda is a name of Agni (the sacrificial fire, the "mother" in which it grows being the fire-stick), or of a divine being closely associated with Agni, a messenger of Vivasvat, bringing the hidden fire to the Bhrigus. Sayana identifies him with Vayu, the wind, in RV 1.93.6. In the Atharvaveda and later, the word also has the meaning of "air, wind, breeze". It is also a name of Shiva, of a son of Garuda, and of a Rishi.

== See also ==
- Theft of fire
- Apris
- Prometheus’ etymology
