= Theft of fire =

Recurring theme in world mythologies

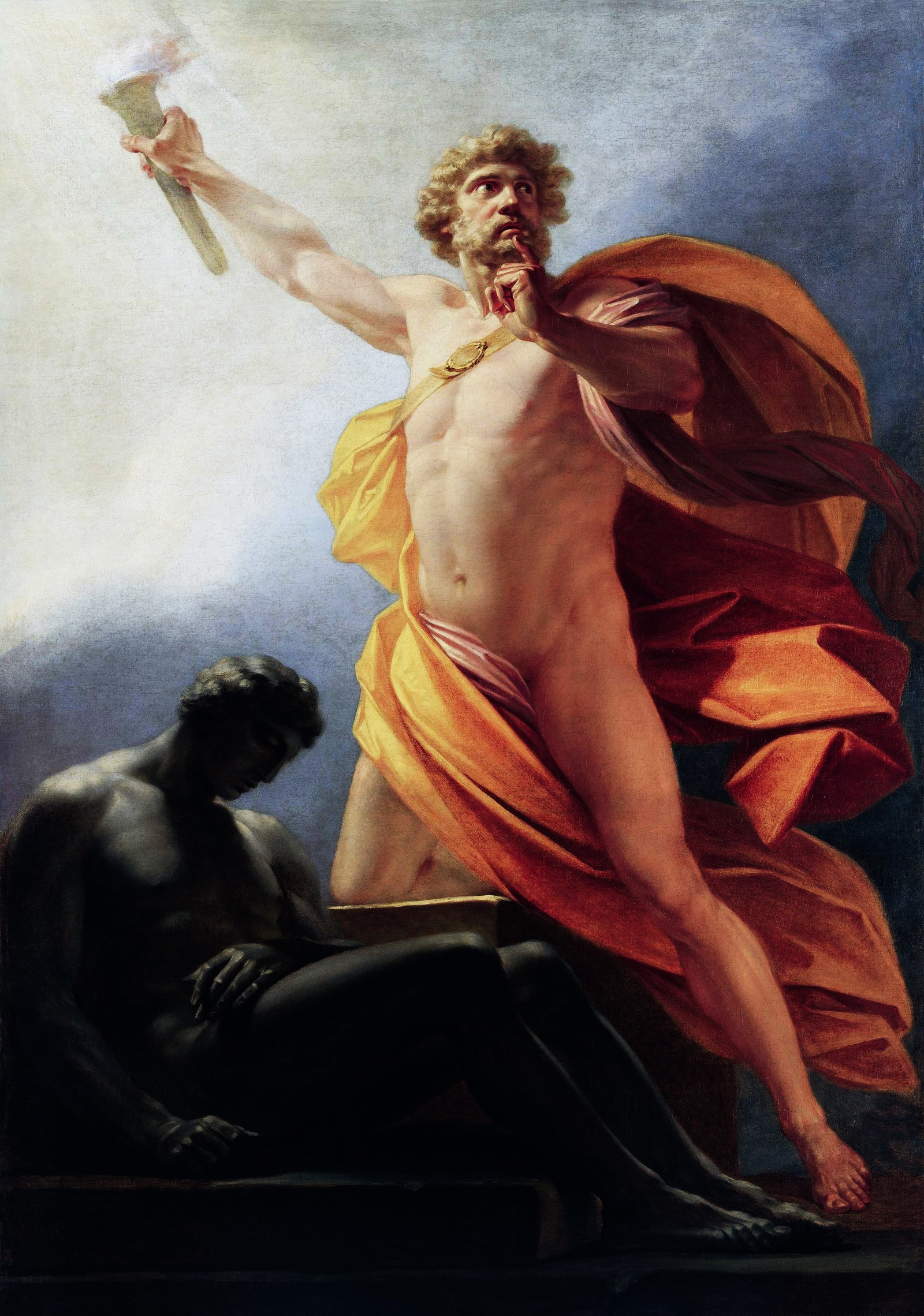
Prometheus Brings Fire to Mankind (1817) by Heinrich Füger

The theft of fire for the benefit of humanity is a theme that recurs in many world mythologies, symbolizing the acquisition of knowledge, or technology, and its transformative impact on civilization. Its recurrent themes include trickster figures as the thief, and supernatural heroic guardians who hoard fire from humanity, often out of mistrust for humans. These myths reflect the significance of fire in human history, which is considered a major milestone in the development of human society.

In African mythology, the San peoples tell of ǀKaggen, stealing fire from the ostrich and bringing it to people. In the Americas, Native American and First Nations tribes attribute the gift of fire to animals. In Eurasian cultures, fire theft takes on various forms. The Vedic Rigveda narrates hero Mātariśvan recovering hidden fire. Greek mythology recounts Prometheus stealing heavenly fire for humanity and suffering greatly as punishment for doing so. In Oceania, Polynesian myths often feature Māui as the fire thief, with diverse variations across regions.

The metaphor of fire theft extends into modern times, particularly in the context of nuclear weapons. The destructive power of atomic bombs is likened to Prometheus's act of stealing fire, which is used to symbolize the dangerous knowledge that humanity has gained. Figures like Robert Oppenheimer and statesman Henry Kissinger have invoked the metaphor to highlight the responsibility that comes with such power.

== Examples ==
=== Africa ===
The San peoples, the indigenous Southern African hunter-gatherers, tell how ǀKaggen, in the form of a mantis, brought the first fire to the people by stealing it from the ostrich, who kept the fire beneath its wings. In another version of the myth, Piisi|koagu steals fire from the ostrich.

=== The Americas ===
Among various Native American tribes of the Pacific Northwest and First Nations, fire was stolen and given to humans by Raven, Coyote, Beaver or Dog.

In Algonquin myth, Rabbit stole fire from an old man and his two daughters.

In Cherokee myth, after Possum and Buzzard had failed to steal fire, Grandmother Spider used her web to sneak into the land of light. She stole fire, hiding it in a clay pot or a silk net.

According to a Mazatec legend, the opossum spread fire to humanity. Fire fell from a star and an old woman kept it for herself. The opossum took fire from the old woman and carried the flame on its tail, resulting in its hairlessness.

According to the Muscogees/Creeks, Rabbit stole fire from the Weasels.

In Ojibwa myth, Nanabozho the hare stole fire and gave it to humans.

According to some Yukon First Nations people, Crow stole fire from a volcano in the middle of the water.

In a story from the Lengua/Enxet people of the Gran Chaco in Paraguay, a man steals fire from a bird after he notices the bird cooking snails on burning sticks. The bird enacts revenge by creating a thunderstorm that damages the man's village.

=== Asia ===
In Chinese mythology, Suiren is an ancient mythological figure regarded as one of the pioneers of civilization. He is most famous for inventing the method of making fire, teaching people how to use fire for warmth, cooking food, and driving away wild animals. As a result, Suiren is revered as one of the "Three Sovereigns" of the ''Three Sovereigns and Five Emperors'' period in Chinese history.

In Hindu mythology, according to the vedic Rigveda (3:9.5), the hero Mātariśvan recovered fire, which had been hidden from humanity.

While Omoikane in Japanese mythology is not directly associated with the theft of fire, he fits into the broader motif of bringing light and knowledge to humanity, which parallels the Promethean myth. Omoikane is revered for his wisdom and strategic thinking, particularly in the myth where he helps orchestrate the plan to lure the sun goddess Amaterasu out of her cave, restoring light to the world.

=== Europe ===
In Greek mythology, according to Hesiod (Theogony, 565-566 and Works & Days, 50) and Pseudo-Apollodorus (Bibliotheca, 1.7.1), the Titan-god Prometheus steals the heavenly fire for humanity, enabling the progress of civilization, for which he was punished by being chained to a mountain, with his liver eaten by an eagle every day and regenerated at night until he was finally freed by the hero Heracles.

In one of the versions of Georgian myth, Amirani stole fire from metalsmiths, who refused to share it – and knowledge of creating it – with other humans.

The story of Faust in German folklore and legends aligns with the Promethean motif of the theft of fire, as it also features a protagonist who seeks forbidden knowledge and power through a pact with the devil, Mephistopheles. Both Faust and Prometheus challenge divine boundaries, ultimately facing severe consequences for their transgressions.

The Vainakh hero Pkharmat brought fire to humankind and was chained to Mount Kazbek as punishment.

=== Oceania ===
In Polynesian myth, Māui is the thief of fire. There are many variations of the myth. In the version told in New Zealand, an ancestress of Maui is the keeper of fire, and she stores it in her fingernails and toenails. Maui nearly tricks her into giving him all of her nails, but she catches onto him and throws her last toenail down, engulfing the ground in flame and nearly killing Maui.

In the mythology of the Wurundjeri people of Australia, it was the Crow who stole the secret of fire from the Karatgurk women.

== Nuclear weapons ==
Since shortly after the detonation of the first atomic bombs, the destructive power of atomic weapons has been compared to the story of Prometheus and the theft of fire.

F. L. Campbell wrote in "Science on the March: Atomic Thunderbolts", in the September 1945 issue of The Scientific Monthly:

Modern Prometheans have raided Mount Olympus again and have brought back for man the very thunderbolts of Zeus.

The biography of Robert Oppenheimer by Kai Bird and Martin J. Sherwin is entitled American Prometheus in reference to the myth. Further comparisons to Prometheus have been made in publications by the United Nations, MIT's Technology Review and Harvard's Nuclear Study Group.

The "theft of fire" metaphor has also been used to argue against the proliferation of nuclear weapons by the Stockholm International Peace Research Institute and repeatedly by statesman Henry Kissinger as early as 1957, at the Munich Security Conference and as part of the Nuclear Threat Initiative with former Senator Sam Nunn, former Secretary of Defense William Perry and former Secretary of State George Shultz. Supporters of nuclear power have interpreted the anecdote more favorably.

== See also ==
- Comparative mythology
- Control of fire by early humans
- Olympic flame
