= Átahsaia =

Mythical demon in Zuni religion

Átahsaia (alternatively spelled A'tahsaia or Atasaya) is a giant cannibalistic demon in the religion and mythos of the Zuni people of the Southwestern United States.

== Depiction ==
Átahsaia is a demon, and thus a spiritual creature. But Átahsaia is also depicted as having physical form. He is a giant, several times larger than a normal human being. In one story, he is depicted as so huge that he cannot fit his shoulders into a cave in which a normal human being can pass easily. In another, his torso is said to be at least as big as a large elk's. In one story, he is said to have long, wild grey hair and hands with skin so thick and gnarled that the knuckles appeared horned. In another tale, he is said to have chest hair as prickly as a porcupine's quills, immensely muscular arms covered in black and white scales, a scalp covered in bristly hair like a bison's mane, a mouth that stretched from ear to ear, and a wrinkled, swollen red face. Several stories agree that he had bulging eyes that did not blink, yellow tusks that protruded past his lips, and long talons.

Átahsaia is depicted as having a number of unsavory behavioral traits. He is a cannibal, but in addition to eating his fellow demons he is also depicted as hungry for human flesh. He is also an inveterate liar.

Átahsaia is often depicted armed with weapons. In one story, his weapon is a huge flint axe. In another, he is said to carry a flint knife "as broad as a man's thigh and twice as long" (which gives an indication of his height as well). He pushes his hair out of his eyes with this knife, leaving his hair crimson with blood. Sometimes, he is said to carry a bow made from an oak sapling.

== In myth and story ==
Átahsaia appears in many different Zuni legends. In the story "Átahsaia, the Cannibal Demon," the demon lies to two young maidens, who (believing he is their ugly grandfather) follow Átahsaia to his home. The demon tries to feed them a soup made of human children, but they trick him and do not eat it. He tries to get the maidens to comb his hair, but again they trick him and do not touch him. The twin Zuni war gods, Åhayúta and Mátsailéma, rescue the two young women and kill the demon. They skin him, and create an effigy from his hide. They then trick their grandmother into believing it is Átahsaia. When she discovers the truth, she declares she will never visit them ever again.

In the story "The Rabbit Huntress and Her Adventures," a young woman leaves her starving family to hunt rabbits for a meal. A skilled hunter, she catches many rabbits. She is caught in a blizzard, and seeks refuge in a cave. Átahsaia finds her there, but cannot enter due to his huge size. He demands to eat all that she has, and she not only gives him her rabbits but her hunting gear and her very clothes. Unsated, Átahsaia attempts to break into the cave using his flint club. The twin war gods, Åhayúta and Mátsailéma, hear the commotion and kill Átahsaia. The two heroes guard the girl during the night. The next day, they kill hundreds of rabbits for her, and send her back to her village. The maiden learns that even though a woman can be a great hunter, it is better for her to marry a great hunter than to be one herself.

According to anthropologist Elsie Clews Parsons, Átahsaia figures in a Zuni spiritual dance intended to teach children lessons about obedience. In Zuni folklore, the a'doshlě is a "grandfather god" and the suukě a "grandmother god"—representations of Átahsaia. Tribal elders often impersonate the a'doshlě and the suukě in dances intended to frighten children and impress upon them the need for obedience (lest the a'doshlě or suukě carry them off to horrors in the spirit world). The a'doshlě dons a black mask with white spots and long, stringy black hair (the suukě's mask is white with black dots and with white, stringy hair). Both masks have yellow, protruding teeth and tusks. The a'doshlě carries a flint knife, which he uses to brush back his hair with. The dance in which Átahsaia appears is the "wa'templa", or "All Herds," dance, performed in late winter or early spring. The goal of the dance is to "wipe the earth", to allow dead things to decay and the land and people to be renewed.

More recently, poet Janet K. Brennan has written a poem about Átahsaia, depicting the demon as a gentle giant catching fireflies.

In her Lizzie Grace series, author Keri Arthur has one summoned by a master vampire witch for revenge against her maker in Shadow's End.

== Bibliography ==
- Brennan, Janet K. Gentle Tugs: A Celebration of Life, Love, and Other Addictions. Albuquerque, N.M.: Casa de Snapdragon, 2010.
- Cushing, Frank Hamilton. Zuñi Folk Tales. New York: Putnam, 1931.
- Jackson, Everett Gee and Macfarlan, Allan A. North American Indian Legends. Mineola, N.Y.: Dover Publishing, 2001.
- Parsons, Elsie Clews. "The Zuñi A'doshlě and Suukě." American Anthropologist. July-September 1916.
