= ǀKaggen =

Demiurge and folk hero of the San people of southern Africa

- Creation (demi-urge)
- Animals: Praying mantis, bull eland, a louse, a snake, and a caterpillar
- Ethnic group: San
- Consort: ǀHúnntuǃattǃatte̥n ("Coti")
- Offspring: !Xo (Porcupine, adopted daughter); Cogaz; Gewi; Ichneumon

ǀKaggen (more accurately ǀKágge̥n or ǀKaggən, sometimes corrupted to Cagn and sometimes called Mantis) is a demiurge and folk hero of the San people of southern Africa. He is a trickster god who can shape shift, usually taking the form of a praying mantis but also a bull eland, a louse, a snake, and a caterpillar.

== Shapeshifting ==
ǀKaggen is a trickster who is able to shape shift into the form of any animal. He is most frequently represented as a praying mantis but also takes the form of a bull eland, a louse, a snake, and a caterpillar. His wife, ǀHúnntuǃattǃatte̥n (sometimes spelled as Coti), is represented as a marmot or rather a Cape hyrax and is known as the mother of bees. Their adopted daughter is represented as a porcupine.

== Eland myth ==
One of the first animals created by ǀKaggen, and his favourite, was the eland. ǀKaggen's wife ǀHúnntuǃattǃatte̥n gave birth to the eland, and ǀKaggen hid it near a secluded cliff to let it grow. One day his sons, Cogaz and Gewi, were out hunting. Not knowing their father's love for the eland, they killed it. ǀKaggen was angry, and told Gewi to put the blood from the dead eland into a pot and churn it. Blood spattered from the pot onto the ground and turned into snakes. ǀKaggen was displeased. Next, Gewi scattered the blood, and it turned into hartebeests. Again, ǀKaggen was unhappy. He told ǀHúnntuǃattǃatte̥n to clean the pot and add more blood from the eland, with fat from the heart. She churned it, and ǀKaggen sprinkled the mixture on the ground. It turned into a large herd of eland. This was how ǀKaggen gave meat to his people to hunt and eat. The Bushmen attribute the wildness of the eland to the fact that ǀKaggen's sons killed it before it was ready to be hunted, spoiling it.

=== Mongoose (ichneumon) variation ===
The scholar David Lewis-Williams recounts a variation of the eland myth involving the meerkats. ǀKaggen's daughter the porcupine married the meerkat, kwammang-a. They had the mongoose as a son. The mongoose was close to his grandfather ǀKaggen. ǀKaggen used to take honey to feed his favourite, the eland. The people were curious as to what ǀKaggen was doing with the honey, so they sent the mongoose to spy on him and find out. When the mongoose saw ǀKaggen giving honey to the eland, he reported his discovery to his brothers, the meerkats. While ǀKaggen was out gathering honey, the meerkats persuaded the mongoose to show them where the eland was. They called the eland out of its hiding place and killed it.

== See also ==
- San religion

== Sources ==
- Asante, Molefi K.; Abu Shardow Abarry (1996). African Intellectual Heritage: A Book of Sources. Temple University Press. pp. 35–37. ISBN 1-56639-403-1.
- Barnard, Alan (1992). Hunters and Herders of Southern Africa. Cambridge University Press. ISBN 0-521-42865-3.
- Hastings, James (2003). Encyclopedia of Religion and Ethics Part 2. Kessinger Publishing. ISBN 0-7661-3670-1.
- Lang, Andrew (2003). Myth, Ritual and Religion Part 1. Kessinger Publishing. ISBN 0-7661-5668-0.
- Lewis-Williams, David (2000). Stories that Float from Afar: Ancestral Folklore of the San of Southern Africa. New Africa Books. ISBN 0-86486-462-0.
- McNamee, Gregory (1996). A Desert Bestiary. Big Earth Publishing. ISBN 1-55566-176-9.
- Meletinsky, Eleazar M.; Guy Lanoue; Alexandre Sadetsky (2000). The Poetics of Myth. Routledge. ISBN 0-415-92898-2.
- Moore, Elizabeth; J. David Lewis-Williams; D. G. Pearce (2004). San Spirituality: Roots, Expression, and Social Consequences. Rowman Altamira. ISBN 0-7591-0432-8.
- Solomon, Anne; Anne Lewis (1998). The Essential Guide to San Rock Art. New Africa Books. ISBN 0-86486-430-2.
- Stookey, Lorena Laura (2004). Thematic guide to world mythology. Greenwood Publishing Group. ISBN 0-313-31505-1.
