= Happy hunting ground =

American Indian concept of the afterlife

The happy hunting ground is a concept of the afterlife associated with the Native Americans in the United States. The phrase most likely originated with the British settlers' interpretation of the Indian description.

== History ==
The phrase first appears in 1823 in The Pioneers by James Fenimore Cooper:

"Hawk-eye! My fathers call me to the happy hunting-grounds."

Historian Charles L. Cutler suggests that Cooper "either coined or gave currency to" the use of the phrase "happy hunting ground" as a term for the afterlife. The phrase also began to appear soon after in the writing of Washington Irving.

In 1911, Sioux physician Charles Eastman wrote that the phrase "is modern and probably borrowed, or invented by the white man".
