= Misizla =

In Wendish mythology Misizla (or Sicksa) was a godlike hero. He was a warrior-musician wearing a sword and armour, playing his bagpipe. He may in fact be Misizlaw (died 999) who wanted to restore Slavic pagan faith.
