= Ahayuta =

Twin gods of war in Zuni mythology

According to Zuni mythology, Ahayu'da (also known as "War Gods"') are the twin gods of war. They are also physical representations endowed with certain spiritual powers.

== Origins ==
Ahayu'da were created by Awonawilona, the Sun God, to protect the first people from their enemies, using lightning. They are second only to Awonawilona himself.

== Names ==
"Benedict (1935 :1) and Bunzel (1932 : 584, n. 96) give the names Watusti (Bunzel uses the term Watsutsi) and Yanaluha to these" twin-brothers.

== Feats ==
- The ʼahayutah (Ahayu'da) overcame a one-horned giant (who had been kicking people over cliffs) by tricking his son into killing him;
- They sent a gopher who tunneled into another giant's house to find the rain-clouds which had all been confined to jars there, released the rain-clouds, cut out and burned that giant's heart;

== Worship ==
Legend says that if one desires victory in battle or protection, one should carve an effigy of one or both of the twins from a piece of wood that was struck by lightning.

Followers of the Zuni religion believe that Ahayu'da are still defending all the peoples of the earth.

== Basis for repatriation ==
As far as is known by outsiders, Zuni Ahayu’da (also known as ‘War Gods’) that are "retired" are to be placed in open-air shrines in order to naturally disintegrate. This is believed to keep balance and order in the natural world. However, over the previous century outsiders took many Ahayu’da from their shrines. As the removal of Ahayu’da from shrines cause all manner of misfortunes to occur, by 1978 the Deer and Bear clans—the groups known to create new Ahayu’da annually—decided that the Ahayu’da must be returned. The three principles that guided the return of the Ahayu’da are as follows:

1. The Ahayu’da are communally owned.
2. No one has the authority to take them from their shrines. Any Ahayu’da removed from its shrine has been stolen.
3. The Ahayu’da are integral to the practice of Zuni religion. Their absence actively prevents the Zuni from carrying out their beliefs.

== Repatriation processes ==
In 1978 the Zuni contacted the Denver Art Museum, the auction house of Sotheby Parke Bernet, and the Smithsonian Institution’s Museum of Natural History to request the return of Ahayu’da in each collection. Zuni cultural customs dictate that anyone with an objection to the actions of another must approach their opponent peacefully to resolve the matter. The Zuni rapidly gained a reputation as patient negotiators who were willing to come to mutually agreeable terms. Their humanistic approach saved litigation as a last resort. However, institutions found Zuni legal arguments compelling enough that no Ahayu’da repatriation ever became a legal battle.

== Pre-NAGPRA repatriations ==
The early history of Ahayu'da repatriations is summarized in T.J. Ferguson, Roger Anyon, and Edmund J. Ladd’s report "Repatriation at the Pueblo of Zuni: Diverse Solutions to Complex Problems". They state that the first Ahayu’da was successfully repatriated from the Sotheby Parke Bernet auction in New York City in 1978. Meetings between the Denver Museum of Art and the Zuni tribe immediately followed this victory. In 1980 the Denver Art Museum returned three Ahayu’da, and subsequently three museums in New Mexico, two in Iowa and Oklahoma, and a private collector returned a total of ten Ahayu’da. Though the Smithsonian Institution sponsored a group of Zuni religious leaders to view their collection of Zuni objects as early as 1978, it was not until 1987 that the Museum of Natural History returned two Ahayu’da to the Zuni.

After the repatriation of the Smithsonian Ahayu’da, the Zuni launched a full-scale campaign. At Zuni request, the Institute of the North American West (a non-profit educational institution operating from 1984 to 1993) put together a report to tell the story of the Ahayu’da repatriation from 1977 to 1988. It included a list of all known Ahayu’da owned by museums and private collectors. This report was used to solicit representation from the Department of Justice: the Zuni required legal representation to match that of the museums they were negotiating with. The report also served as a catalogue of institutions to be contacted about the return of Ahayu’da. In 1988 the Zuni stopped a second auction of an Ahayu’da by Sotheby Parke-Bernet from the Warhol Foundation. In the same year, the Logan Museum of Anthropology and the Milwaukee Public Museum returned five more Ahayu’da.

In 1990 the Native American Graves Protection and Repatriation Act (NAGPRA) was passed, in great part because of the national recognition that the Zuni's efforts had received.

== Post-NAGPRA repatriations ==
A considerable increase in repatriation of Ahayu’da and other religious objects occurred after the passage of NAGPRA. Since 1978 more than one hundred Ahayu’da have been returned. At this time, almost all known Ahayu’da have been repatriated. Additionally, one has been returned from a foreign museum, and the Zuni are campaigning for the repatriation of other internationally collected Ahayu’da. As there are no European laws in place to protect Native American cultural property, the Zuni campaign has been less successful abroad.

== See also ==
- Native American mythology
