= Culture hero =

Mythological hero who changes the world through invention or discovery

A culture hero is a mythological hero specific to some group (cultural, ethnic, religious, etc.) who changes the world through invention or discovery. Places like the French Panthéon and the German Walhalla (memorial) show the term is also used for regular people who had civil courage. Although many culture heroes help with the creation of the world, most culture heroes are important because of their effect on the world after creation. A typical culture hero might be credited as the discoverer of fire, agriculture, songs, tradition, law, or religion, and is usually the most important legendary figure of a people, sometimes as the founder of its ruling dynasty.

== Culture heroes in mythology ==
=== History of a culture hero ===
The term "culture hero" was originated by historian Kurt Breysig, who used the German word heilbringer, which translates to savior. Over the years, "culture hero" has been interpreted in many ways. Older interpretations by Breysig, Paul Ehrenreich, and Wilhelm Schmidt thought that the journeys of culture heroes were ways in which humans could attempt to understand things in nature, such as the rising and setting of the sun, or the movement of the stars and constellations. Eventually, their interpretations were rejected and replaced with newer interpretations by scholars such as Hermann Baumann, Adolf E. Jensen, Mircea Eliade, Otto Zerries, Raffaele Pettazzoni, and Harry Tegnaeus, which evolved as a result of having more access to ethnological data, creating the present version of the culture hero.

=== Creation of a culture hero ===
Culture heroes can perform unbelievable tasks in life because they are different from normal people. Typically, a culture hero's power originates from birth, an event that rarely occurs regularly. When their mothers conceive, it is generally not by her husband but by the wind, a drop of water, or some deity. Newborn culture heroes are either very powerful babies or full-grown men, an attribute highlighting their exceptional nature.

=== Characteristics of a culture hero ===
A culture hero generally goes on an adventure (often called the hero's journey) that does one of the following:

- Saves humankind from a dangerous monster
- Shapes the world (rivers, mountains, etc...)
- Creates distinction between humans and animals
- Makes economic life possible for humans (teaching the humans)
- Sets the origin of death

Because culture heroes often possess shapeshifting abilities, they often can transform from man to animal and back. The typical culture hero possesses both admirable and deplorable personal qualities, a combination that is often responsible for sending him on his great journey. Some culture heroes are tricksters, acting selfishly and ultimately benefiting mankind only unintentionally.

=== Disappearance of a culture hero ===
Once culture heroes have finished their task, they usually disappear. In many stories, the hero is transformed back to his origin, and his death place is marked with a stone, tree, or body of water. The end of a culture hero's life will generally lead to the creation of something else, such as a river, constellation, food, animals, and the moon and sun. Culture heroes are the etiological explanation for many humans about the things occurring in their daily lives.

=== Examples ===
In many Native American mythologies and beliefs, the coyote spirit stole fire from the gods (or stars or sun) and is more of a trickster than a culture hero. Natives from the Southeastern United States typically saw a rabbit trickster/culture hero, and Pacific Northwest native stories often feature a raven in this role: in some stories, Raven steals fire from his uncle Beaver and eventually gives it to humans. In Greek mythology Prometheus has a similar role. The Western African trickster spider Anansi is also common. In Norse mythology, Odin steals the mead of poetry from Jötunheim and is credited as the discoverer of the runes.

== See also ==
- Folk hero
- Founding myth
- List of culture heroes
