= Yei Tso =

Giant of Navajo mythology and first of the Anaye

Yei Tso (Navajo: Ye'iitsoh, literally "Big Monster") is a central figure in Navajo mythology and the first and most powerful of the Anaye (Alien Monsters). In the Navajo creation story, the Diné Bahaneʼ, Yei Tso and his fellow monsters nearly drove early humans to extinction during the time of the Fifth World. He was eventually defeated by the Hero Twins, who serve as the primary protectors in Navajo tradition. The legend of this battle is used to explain the unique geology of the Southwestern United States, where various rock formations are identified as the giant's remains.

== The Hero Twins and the Sun ==
The story of Yei Tso is inseparable from the origins of the Hero Twins: Monster Slayer (Naayééʼ Neizghání) and Born for Water (Tóbájíshchíní). Born to the deity Changing Woman, the brothers realized that humanity could not survive while Yei Tso ruled the land. They traveled to the home of their father, the Sun (Jóhonaaʼéí), to seek weapons. After passing a series of life-threatening tests, the Sun recognized them as his sons and equipped them with magical weapons made of lightning bolts. These tools were necessary because Yei Tso was also a son of the Sun, born when the Sun's rays struck a stone, making him a half-brother to the Twins.

== The Battle at Mount Taylor ==
Yei Tso was a mountain-sized giant who wore four layers of magical armor made from multi-colored flint. From his home on the peak of Tsoodził (Mount Taylor), he monitored the surrounding valleys. When the Twins confronted him, Yei Tso attacked by throwing four massive bolts of lightning. The brothers evaded these strikes by standing on sacred rainbows and retaliated with the Sun's lightning, shattering the giant's flint armor. When Yei Tso fell, his blood poured out in a massive river. To prevent the giant from regenerating, Monster Slayer used a flint knife to draw a line in the earth, which congealed the blood into hard, black stone.

== Geological and Cultural Significance ==
This legend provides a cultural etiology for the landscape of the Four Corners region:

- **Lava Flows:** The black volcanic rock fields of El Malpais National Monument are considered the hardened blood (Ye'iitsoh Dił) of the giant.
- **Flint Fragments:** The colorful flint and agate shards found on Mount Taylor are identified as fragments of his shattered armor.
- **Petrified Wood:** Fossilized logs in Petrified Forest National Park are traditionally called Ye’iitsoh Bitsi’in, or "the giant’s bones." Tribal tradition warns that taking these "bones" disrupts the balance of the land and brings misfortune.

Beyond geography, Yei Tso represents the "monsters" that destroy human harmony, known as Hózhó. The victory over Yei Tso is spiritually reenacted during the Enemy Way ceremony (Ndááʼ), a healing ritual used to help individuals overcome the "monsters" of conflict and trauma and return to a balanced life.

== See also ==
- Diné Bahaneʼ
- Mount Taylor (New Mexico)
- Changing Woman
