= Yeii =

Spirit deity of the Navajo Nation

The yeii or yei (Navajo: yéí or yéʼii) are spirit deities of the Navajo people. The most benevolent of such beings are the Diyin Diné'e or Holy People who are associated with the forces of nature.

Yéi—There are a number of divinities in the Navaho pantheon known as yéi...which is translated "god" or "genius." What distinction exists between the yéi and other gods is not easy to determine definitely. The Zuñians have a class of gods called by the same name, or more correctly, "yéyi,"... Certain chiefs or important personages among these gods are called by names which begin with the syllables hastsé—as Hasiséyalti (Talking God), Hastséhogan (House God). It is believed that this, if spelled etymologically, would appear as hastyé, but it is not so pronounced. Hast is a prefix denoting age, especially venerable age. We have it in the word hastín, which means a worthy or respected old man. Hastyé would mean a venerable yéi or god. The yéi seem to be deities of minor importance to those previously mentioned and to be more numerous. Thus, while there is but one Estsánatlehi, but one Nayénĕzgạni, and but one To'badsĭstsíni there are several Hastséhogan and several Hastséyalti, who are chiefs of the yéi. The yéi are supposed to abid in certain localities, and in prayers in their honor the home is mentioned of the yéi to whom appeal is specially made. ...The yéi are supposed to be married and have families. The males are called yébaka; the females, yébaad. Hastsézĭni, the god of fire, and Hastséoltoi, the divine huntress, or goddess of the chase, belong, as their names indicate, to the yéi; while Gánaskĭdi, the harvest god and Tó'nenĭli, Water Sprinkler, are associated with them in the legends.

Yei bichei (Yébîchai), or "maternal grandfather of the yei", is another name of Talking God who often speaks on behalf of the other Holy People. (He, along with Growling God, Black God, and Water Sprinkler, were the first four Holy People encountered by the Navajo.) He is invoked (along with eight other male yei) in the "Night Chant" or "Nightway" (Navajo: Tłʼééʼjí or Kléjê Hatál), sometimes simply called "Yei bichei," a nine-night ceremony in which masked dancers personify the gods.

A rainbow yei, sometimes considered an aspect of the rain-god Water Sprinkler, is drawn around every sandpainting; his body curls around the south, west, and north sides to protect the painting from outside influences, and to protect the user from the power of the god depicted in the painting. He does not need to cover the east, because no evil can come from the east in Navajo thought.

== See also ==
- Diné Bahaneʼ
