= Tobadzischini =

Hero in Navajo mythology

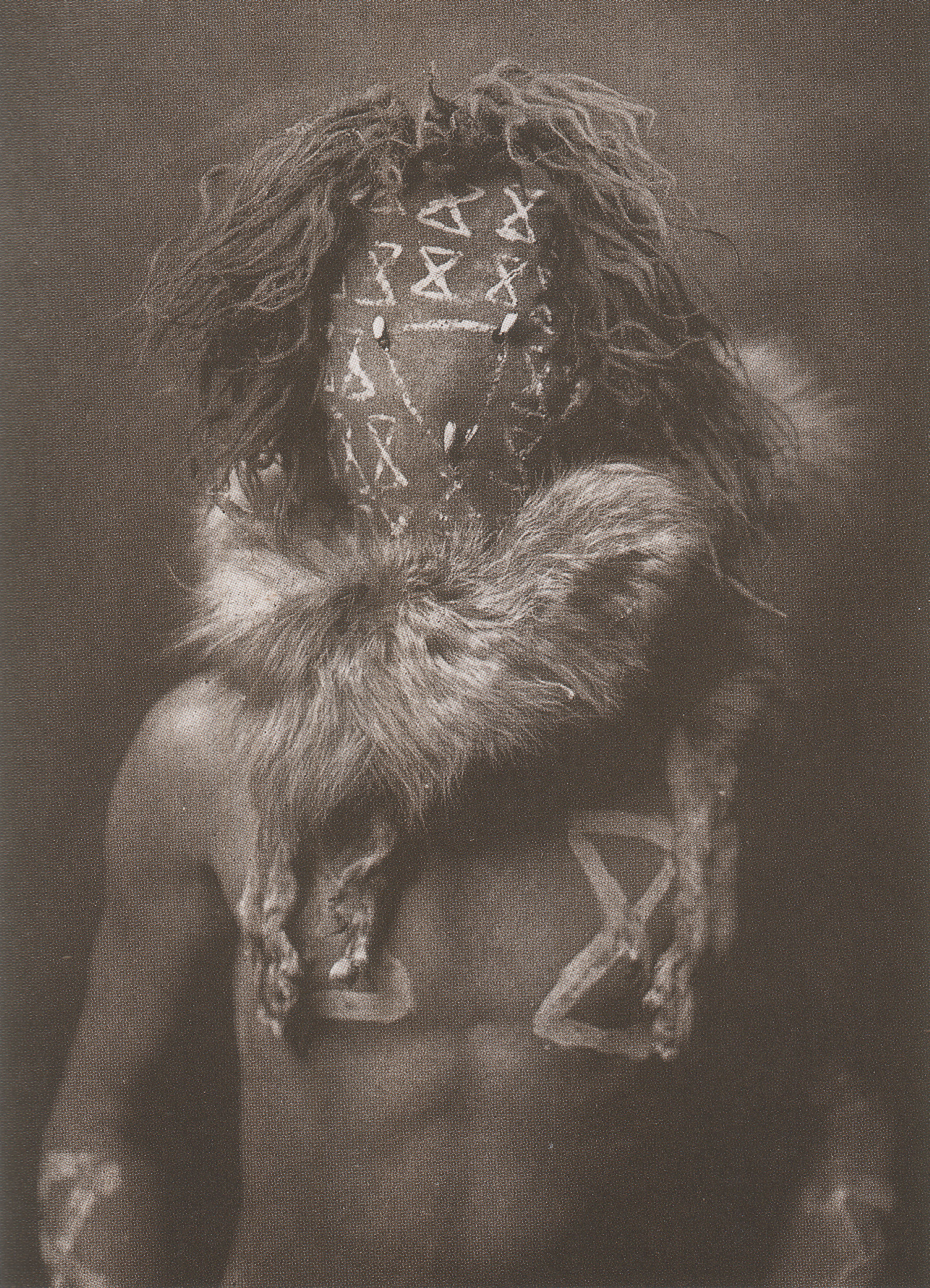
A depiction of Tobadzischini, photographed by Edward S. Curtis

Tóbájízhchíní (Navajo pronunciation: [txópɑ́tʃɪ́ʒ̊tʃʰɪ́nɪ́], "Child of Water"/"Born For Water") is a mythical hero from Navajo mythology who helped his brother Nayéé‘ Neizghání /Nayenezgani rid the world of the Nayéé’/Anaye. He is sometimes considered the Navajo god of war and agriculture. Nayenezgani appears to be a lord of light, while Tobadzischini, moist and dark, is his opposite, a lord of darkness.
