= Coyote (Navajo mythology) =

Figure in Navajo mythology

Coyote (Navajo: mąʼii) is an irresponsible and trouble-making character who is nevertheless one of the most important and revered characters in Navajo mythology. Even though Tó Neinilii is the Navajo god of rain, Coyote also has powers over rain. Coyote’s ceremonial name is Áłtsé hashké which means "first scolder". In Navajo tradition, Coyote appears in creation myths, teaching stories, and healing ceremonies.

== Mythology ==
Coyote is a key figure in Navajo mythology, and of all the figures in Navajo mythology, Coyote (Mąʼii) is the most contradictory. He is a shadowy figure that can be funny or fearsome. Coyote is greedy, vain, foolish, cunning and also occasionally displays a degree of power. "In common with Tricksters generally, he serves to test the bounds of possibilities and order."

Coyote looks like a coyote in animal form and she looks like a sagacious woman in human form.

=== Creation myths ===
The origin myths present Coyote as an ancient being existing from the beginning and exhibits the general characteristics of the Culture Hero-Trickster.

==== Emergence ====
The First World is a dark land of mists. First Man and First Woman pass through the Second World which was blue, to the Third where animals, and birds were formed. The Coyote steals Water Buffalo's children, at the instigation of First Woman. Water Buffalo then causes a great flood which forces First Man and First Woman to move on the Fourth (and present) World.

==== The Milky Way ====
One day Black God was busy making the constellations by carefully ordering the stars in the sky when Coyote became impatient and tossed the remaining stars from a bag, or occasionally a blanket, into the sky, forming the Milky Way. This story explains the reason some stars are dimmer than others, because Black God did not light the ones Coyote blew into the sky on fire. In another version of the story, Black God made the Milky Way on purpose. The Navajo believe it provides a pathway for the spirits traveling between heaven and earth, each little star being one footprint.

==== Creation of lunar phases ====
Coyote argues against the simplicity of the day and night scheme where animals are awake and animals sleep. This leads to the creation of the movement of the stars, the lunar phases and creation of months. Coyote was also involved in the stories about the naming of the months.

== Stories ==
The stories are meant to both entertain and instruct. The point of "The Coyote and the Lizards" is to listen to your elders.

=== Changing Bear story ===
Coyote wins Changing Bear (Navajo: Asdzání shash nádleehé) as his wife and he uses his magic to make her evil like him. Coyote tricks her into having sexual intercourse with him.

After Changing Bear became evil, Coyote taught Changing Bear the way to use water to divine the location of her brothers. Changing Bear used this ability to find her brothers. In human form, she tells her brothers that she wants to comb their hair and remove their lice like she used to do before she was evil, so they turn their backs to her. She then transforms into a she-bear and kills them.

The moral of this story is to not be like Coyote.

=== Twin brothers story ===
The twin brothers are told by their parents to not hunt far away from home and not to go east, but they do this anyway. The twins return and they tell their parents that they saw Coyote. Their parents warn them to stay away from Coyote and they say Coyote was spying for the Horned Serpent (Navajo: Déélgééd) who has been following the Navajo since their existence.

=== Coyote and the Giant ===
Once a giant was terrorizing the land, and eating people, especially small children. Coyote convinced the giant that if he allowed Coyote to break his leg and then heal it by spitting on it, he would be able to run as fast as Coyote. However, this was one of Coyote's tricks, and the giant thereafter found it much more difficult to outrun anything, even small children.

== Coyoteway ceremony ==
Coyote is the tutelary spirit of Coyoteway, a healing ceremony. Coyoteway aims to restore harmony with an offended Holy person or persons, in this case Coyote People (including foxes and wolves). In Coyoteway, Coyote is a being who lies behind all Coyote People and, when offended, responds by causing illness. As in all Navajo Holyway healing rituals, the singer acts as a mediator between Coyote, the totemic sponsor of the Coyote clan, and the patient.

== Folklore ==
The general view of Coyote in folk belief is generally negative and related to witchcraft. Witches called skin-walkers are believed to be able to adopt the form of a coyote. A Navajo saying holds that if Coyote crosses your path, turn back and do not continue your journey. The coyote is an omen of an unfortunate event or thing in your path or in the near future.

== See also ==
- Coyote (mythology)
