= Race to the Sun (novel) =

2020 novel

Race to Sun by Rebecca Roanhorse
- Author: Rebecca Roanhorse.
- Cover artist: Dale Ray DeForest
- Language: Spanish
- Genre: Fantasy; Mythology; Adventure
- Publisher: Rick Riordan Presents (an imprint of Disney Hyperion)
- Publication date: January 14, 2020
- Publication place: United States
- Media type: Paperbook; Hardcover; e-Book
- Pages: 320
- ISBN: 9781368024822

Race to the Sun is a novel written by Rebecca Roanhorse and was published on January 14, 2020. It is one of many books in the Rick Riordan Presents imprint, and focuses on Navajo mythology. The book follows Nizhoni Begay, who has the self-proclaimed power of detecting monsters, as she adventures with her brother, Mac, and her best friend, Davery Descheny, through a series of trials to the House of the Sun to find her father, who was taken by the mysterious Mr. Charles.

== Synopsis ==
Nizhoni Begay is a seventh-grade Navajo girl who can see monsters, but she struggles to fit in at school and has only one close friend, Davery. During a basketball game, she spots a suspicious man who turns out to be Mr. Charles, a powerful monster disguised as a businessman. Mr. Charles visits Nizhoni’s family and reveals that Nizhoni and her brother Mac are descendants of the Changing Woman’s Hero Twins. He wants to capture Mac because of his emerging water powers and kill Nizhoni because she may become a Monsterslayer capable of stopping him. After Nizhoni discovers that Mr. Charles has kidnapped their father, she, Mac, and Davery escape by train to seek help from Spider Woman.

Along their journey, the children learn that Mr. Charles and his bodyguards are actually shapeshifting bird monsters called the Bináá' yee aghání. With guidance from the magical horned toad Mr. Yazzie, they travel through the sacred mountains of the Navajo homeland to collect special objects for Spider Woman. Nizhoni rescues Black Jet Girl, one of the mountain guardians, while Mac and Davery search for turquoise and abalone shell. Their journey teaches them about their ancestral powers and responsibilities, and they eventually reach Spider Woman, who sends them through four dangerous trials on the Rainbow Road.

During the trials, Nizhoni faces physical dangers as well as emotional challenges. She survives a deadly canyon, a field of knife-like reeds, a magical prom that makes her forget her mission, and a field of mirrors that forces her to confront memories of her mother. Nizhoni learns that her mother, Bethany, had left her family to fight monsters and protect them. After completing the trials, Nizhoni reaches the House of the Sun and receives a magical bow and arrows. She discovers that Mac, Davery, and her mother had been trapped because they failed the trials, but Nizhoni chooses to give up her chance for personal glory so they can all be freed.

The group then prepares for a final battle against Mr. Charles and the Bináá' yee aghání at Shiprock. Nizhoni, her family, the mountain guardians, Spider Woman, and other Monsterslayers fight together against the monsters. Although Mr. Charles nearly defeats Nizhoni and captures Mac, Nizhoni realizes that she is not alone and uses her newly gained connection to lightning to destroy him. After the monsters are defeated, the family reunites with Nizhoni's father and grandmother, while Nizhoni finally reconnects with her mother. Although most people at school will never know what she accomplished, Nizhoni realizes that being accepted and celebrated is less important than protecting the people she loves.

== Development ==
The cover art was revealed in February 2019 to have been by Dale Ray DeForest. A short story written by Roanhorse about Nizhoni is be featured in the short story anthology book, The Cursed Carnival and Other Calamities.

== Reception ==
Kirkus Reviews praised Roanhorse's writing and diverse Native American representation, saying, "By reimagining a traditional story in a contemporary context, populating it with faceted Native characters, and centering it on and around the Navajo Nation, Roanhorse shows that Native stories are active and alive ... Native readers will see themselves as necessary heroes while readers of all walks will want to be their accomplices." Common Sense Media gave the book four out of five stars. Publishers Weekly said, "Roanhorse draws on her husband’s heritage to reimagine Navajo stories and characters, delivering a fast-paced, exciting adventure. While the antagonists could stand further development, Nizhoni’s blend of snark, confidence, and humor proves as multifaceted as the satisfying tale’s focus on friendship, family, and cultural legacy."

The Laughing Place noted, "There is something also comforting in seeing how Roanhorse has tied up all the loose ends in Race to the Sun. Should this be a one-off in the "Rick Riordan Presents" banner, then it is a one a kind jewel that continues to promote the message of the book imprint. Every mythology is unique and exciting, and we should all learn about the cultures and heritages of everyone."

Some reviews, however, were more critical of the book's Navajo representation, like one at the American Indians in Children's Literature, which said that Race to the Sun "[failed] to observe traditional boundaries that normally protect cultural narratives from appropriation" and "there are some unusually problematic internal inconsistencies in the narrative and in some characterization." It also claimed that "Roanhorse must know that some traditional Navajo people consider her use of sacred figures and practices profoundly inappropriate. Those objections are well-documented; she just doesn’t care." On Social Justice Books, Michael Thompson criticized "[Roanhorse's] appropriation and distortions of Dine’ cultural narratives," saying not only that "this book is likely to reach a much larger audience of younger readers, who are both Native and non-Native," but also that "there are some unusually problematic internal inconsistencies in the narrative and in some characterization."
