= Race the Sun =

Race the Sun may refer to:

- Race the Sun (film), a 1996 comedy-drama film
- Race the Sun (video game), a 2013 endless runner video game

== See also ==
- Race to the Sun, a nickname of the Paris–Nice cycling stage race
- Race to the Sun (novel), by Rebecca Roanhorse (2020)
