= Nayenezgani =

Hero in Navajo mythology

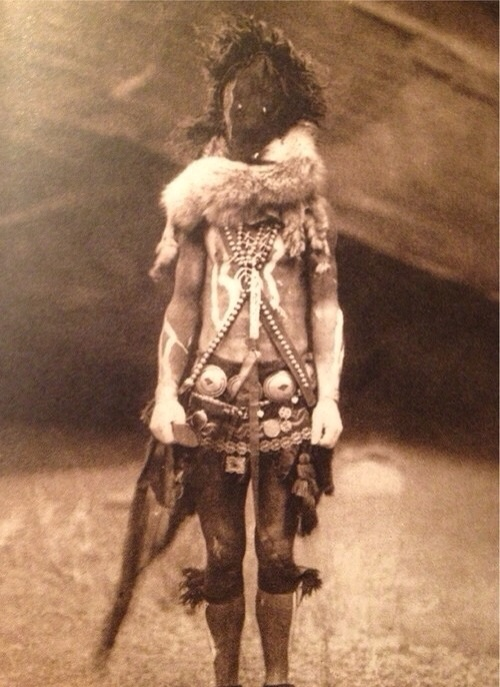
A Navajo man wearing a ceremonial mask and dress of Naayééʼ Neizghání, taken by Edward S. Curtis (c. 1904)

Naayééʼ Neizghání (Navajo pronunciation: [nɑ̀ːjéːʔ nèɪ̀zɣɑ́nɪ́]) is a mythical hero from Navajo mythology who, along with his brother Tóbájízhchíní, rid the world of the Naayééʼ. He is considered by some to be the Navajo god of war, although evidence for this is limited.

== Etymology ==
Naayééʼ Neizghání is a Navajo word that can be translated to "Monster Slayer" or "Killer of Enemies". The name is a relative clause that may be analyzed as naa-yééʼ "enemy-dangerous" + neizghán "[he] kills several [of them]" + -í "person who..." It is cognate to the Chiricahua Apache name Naaghéé'neesghánéń for the analogous figure in Apache myth, who is often cowardly rather than heroic as for the Navajo.

== Mythology ==
=== Birth ===
Changing Woman (sometimes The White-Painted Woman or The White Shell Woman) became pregnant with her children after basking in the Sun God's rays while bathing in a pool of water. The giant Yéʼiitsoh heard when the children were born and set out to kill and devour them. Changing Woman hid her sons and tried to convince Yéʼiitsoh that it was mistaken. When questioned about the small footprints in the snow, Changing Woman replied saying that in her loneliness she made the footprints herself to pretend she has company.

=== Slaying Monsters ===
After both brothers had matured they set out to destroy the Naayééʼ, who were abominations born from "unnatural means" (specifically women having intercourse with objects instead of men). One of the earliest creatures they encountered was the Spider Woman (or the Spider Grandmother) who gave them each a feather that would defend them on their journey, which they used to protect themselves against multiple monsters (including giant birds, bears, and serpents).

=== Meeting the Sun God ===
At one point, the brothers decided to visit their father, Jóhonaaʼéí, the sun. The trials they have to go through are different depending on the version of the story, but most involve figuring out clever ways to climb up into the sky and get past the guards of the sun's house. Once they have proved themselves to their father, he gifts them weapons to help them kill the rest of the Naayééʼ, chief among them being a quiver full of lightning bolts.

=== Killing Yéʼiitsoh ===
Yéʼiitsoh is described as the largest and most powerful of the Naayééʼ, usually the last to be killed by Naayééʼ Neizghání. Whichever method is used to kill the giant, it almost always involves taunting it from a hiding place and striking a fatal blow with a lightning bolt.

== In popular culture ==
Naayééʼ Neizghání and his brother “born of water” along with the Aztec twins are mentioned in, and the Navajo twins, a recurring theme, in Roger Zelazny's book, Eye of Cat. The book’s hero can be regarded as a “pair” of twins, a single being who is both “neolithic” and a collector of “monsters” for Earth’s zoo from many planets, who is forced to slay the greatest monster (either the “Cat” of the title or the hero’s other self, in an act of becoming one), or simply Billy, the civilized twin of “Cat” the evil twin, or Cat the ultimate monster also the hero’s “chindi” (Zelazny’s spelling of a Diné (the People according to mystery writer Anne Hillerman’s Anglo spelling and definition) or Navajo’s name for themselves, a much more complex work, Zelazny’s last, and possibly greatest literary achievement.

In the Buffy the Vampire Slayer universe, Naayééʼ Neizghání appears as one of the slayers before Buffy.

Naayééʼ Neizghání has briefly been mentioned in both Thor and Wonder Woman comics as a part of the Navajo pantheon.

In the book Race to the Sun, Nizhoni and Mac Begay are revealed to be descendants of Naayééʼ Neizghání.
