= Tsichtinako =

Thought Woman (Keresan Tsichtinako, Tse-che-nako, Sussistanako) is a mythological woman or goddess from the origin story of the Acoma Pueblo Indians.

Her name was avoided outside of sacred ceremonies, and she would be referred to as Old Spider Woman instead.

== Origin myth ==
Tsichtinako sent the first two sisters from below the ground into the world. She also taught them several skills such as planting corn, tending and harvesting crops, how to use it for food, and also how to cook using fire. Tsichtinako gave them the knowledge of the prayers of the Acoma people and the creation song. They were told to sing this to the sun, but the light hurt their eyes. They began to question as to why they were sent to the Earth by Tsichtinako. She replied to them "I did not make you. Your father, Uchtsiti made you, and it is he who has made the world, the sun which you have seen, the sky, and many other things which you will see. But Uchtsiti says the world is not yet completed, not yet satisfactory, as he wants it. This is the reason he has made you. You will rule and bring to life the rest of the things he has given you in the baskets." Tsichtinako then allowed the two sisters, named Nautsiti and Iatiku, to choose their clan names. The sisters thought about what they have been given and chose the "Sun clan" and the "Corn clan". The sisters continued to pray to the sun and the earth to accept the things in their baskets and help them grow, and after they finished Tsichtinako told them to look in every direction because they now rule over it all.
