= Black God (Navajo mythology) =

God in Navajo mythology

Artistic rendition of Black God in a photo by Edward S. Curtis

Black God (Navajo: Haashchʼééshzhiní), sometimes known as Fire God in Navajo mythology, is known in said folklore as the God who created and placed the stars. He is described as having a crescent moon on his forehead, a full moon for a mouth, a constellation of Pleiades on his temple and a buckskin mask covered in sacred charcoal with white paint as his clothing. He is also known in Navajo folklore as the inventor of the fire drill and the first being to discover the means by which to generate fire. He has also been attributed to the practice of witchcraft.

Black God is not portrayed in Navajo lore as admirable or heroic like most other Navajo gods. Instead, he is portrayed as old, slow and helpless. Other times in said folklore he is imagined as a “a moody, humorless trickster” who “passes himself off as poor so that people will be generous to him.” According to one version of the Navajo creation story, Black God is first encountered by The First Man and First Woman on the Yellow (third) world in the Navajo creation myth. Black God is also known as a fire god in Navajo mythology.

== Genealogical mythology ==
In Navajo mythology, Black God's father is the concept of fire and his mother is the concept of a comet.

== Creation of the Stars ==
The creation story of the Navajo people is recounted as part of a Navajo Blessingway Ritual:

“The Sky and the Earth were placed after the People emerged from a series of previous worlds. Four Holy People – First Man, First Woman, Salt Woman, and Black God – [sat together and] planned the conditions of life on the surface of the earth.”

Of the four, because of his association with fire, the Navajo saw the Black God as responsible for the creation, and sustaining of all celestial bodies. As the story goes, First Man, First Woman and Salt Woman were sitting in a hogan (a Navajo hut made of wood and dirt) when Black God entered with the constellation of Pleiades affixed to his ankle:

“When several of the Holy People commented on the presence of this constellation, Black God stamped his foot vigorously, bringing the constellation to his knee. A second stamp… brought the stars to his hip.”

According to the story, the Holy People were impressed by the Black God's display and nodded approvingly. Black God then stamped his foot a third and fourth time, until the constellation was lodged in his temple. Satisfied, Black God declared: “There it shall stay!” In the story, the Holy People were so captivated by Black God's performance that they gave him the responsibility of creating constellations with which to adorn the “upper dark.” Black God acquiesced, arranging his star crystals throughout the heavens until the night sky was full of constellations. The crystals had no light of their own, and the night sky remained dark, so he lit the crystals on fire with a 'igniter star'. Black God also went on to impart his fire unto the sun.

== Milky Way creation story ==
In another Navajo story, Black God is set about the work of assembling constellations in an empty sky. According to the story, one at a time, he pulls each star from a pouch strung around his waist, sets it ablaze, and affixes it to the firmament of the sky. When the Navajo god Coyote sees this he becomes impatient. He snatches Black God's pouch away from him, and scatters the remaining stars into the sky forming the Milky Way. In the story, Black God did not have the chance to light the stars Coyote scattered, so some stars are dimmer then others because of this. In another version of the same story, Black God made the Milky Way on purpose.
