= Changing Woman =

Changing Woman may refer to:

- Asdzą́ą́ Nádleehé, a Navajo creator deity
- Changing Woman (album), an album by Buffy Sainte-Marie
