= Diné Bahaneʼ =

Navajo creation myth

Diné Bahaneʼ (Navajo pronunciation: [tɪ̀né pɑ̀xɑ̀nèʔ], Navajo: "Story of the People"), is a Navajo creation story that describes the prehistoric emergence of the Navajo as a part of the Navajo religious beliefs. It centers on the area known as the Dinétah, the traditional homeland of the Navajo, and forms the basis of the traditional Navajo way of life and ceremony. Throughout the stories, the importance of cardinal points and the number four are emphasized in multiple aspects.

The basic outline of Diné Bahaneʼ begins with the creation of the Niłchʼi Diyin (Navajo pronunciation: [nɪ̀ɬtʃʼɪ̀ tɪ̀jɪ̀n], ‘Holy Wind’) as the mists of lights which arose through the darkness to animate and bring purpose to the spirits of the four Diyin Dineʼé (Navajo pronunciation: [tɪ̀jɪ̀n tɪ̀nèʔé], 'Holy People') in the different three lower worlds. According to the story, this event happened before the Earth and the physical aspect of humans had come into being, when only the spiritual aspect of humans existed. The Holy People then began journeying through the different lower worlds, learning important lessons in each one before moving on to the next. The fourth and final world is the world in which the Navajo live now.

== The Four Worlds ==
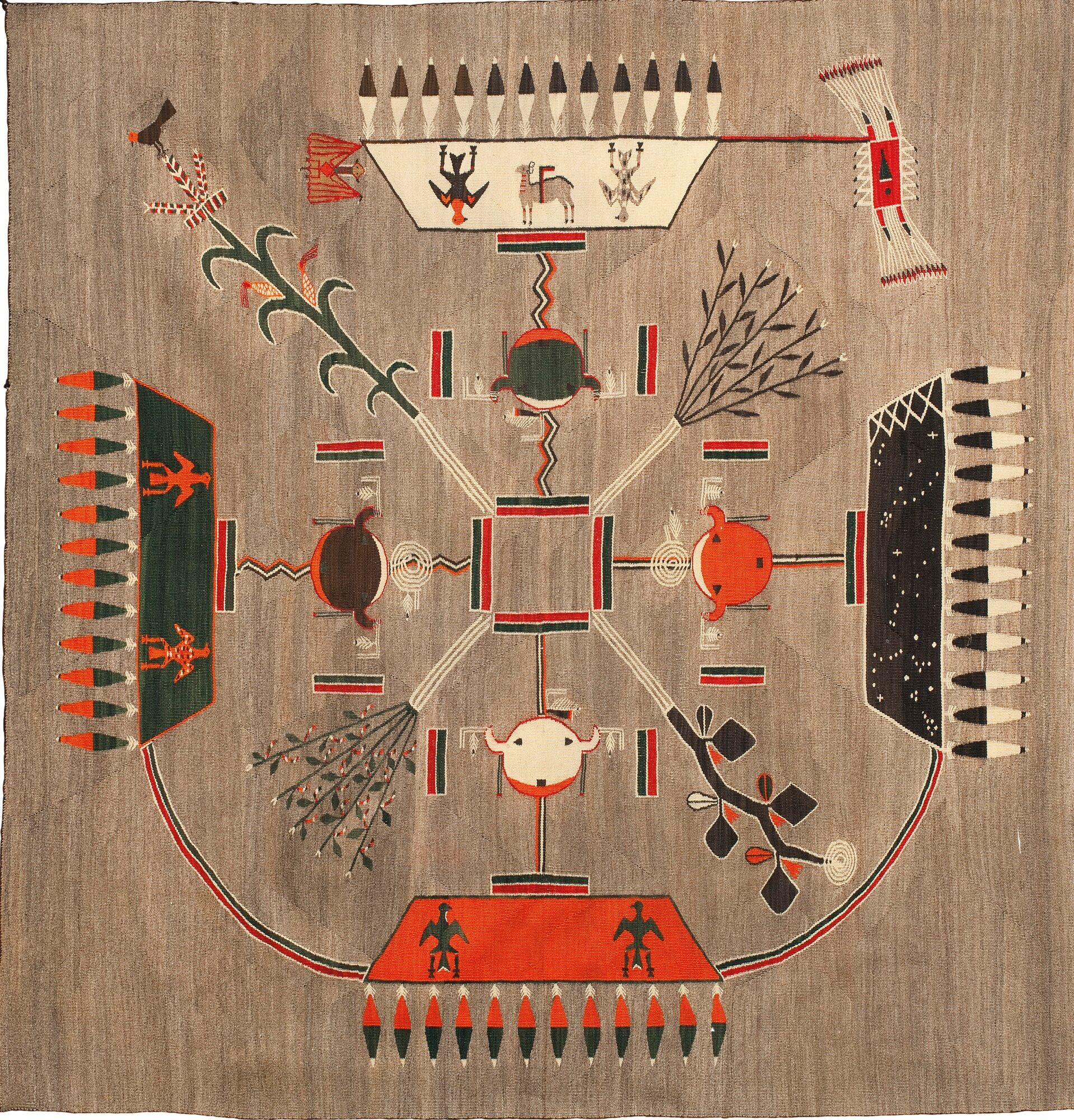
Navajo sandpainting style weaving representing the Four Worlds and four directions

The Diné Bahane’ has detailed descriptions of characteristics and events of the four mythical worlds. The First or Dark World, Niʼ Hodiłhił (Navajo pronunciation: [nɪ̀ʔ hòtɪ̀ɬxɪ̀ɬ]) was small and centered on an island floating in the middle of four seas. The inhabitants of the first world were the four Diyin Dineʼé, the two Coyotes, the four rulers of the four seas, mist beings, and various insect and bat people, the latter being the Air-Spirit People. The supernatural beings First Woman and First Man came into existence here and met for the first time after seeing each other's fire. The various beings on The First World started fighting with one another and thus had to depart by flying out through an opening in the east.

The Second World Niʼ Hodootłʼizh (Navajo pronunciation: [nɪ̀ʔ hòtòːtɬʼɪ̀ʒ]) was inhabited by various blue-gray furred mammals and various birds, including blue swallows. The beings from the First World offended Swallow Chief, Táshchózhii ([txɑ́ʃtʃʰóʒìː]), and they were asked to depart. To do so, the First Man created a wand of jet and other materials to allow the people to walk upon it up into the next world through an opening in the south.

In the Third or Yellow World Niʼ Hałtsooí ([nɪ̀ʔ xɑ̀ɬtsʰòːɪ́]), there were two rivers that formed a cross, the Sacred Mountains, and more animal people, but there was still no sun. This time it was not discord among the people that drove them away but a great flood caused by Tééhoołtsódii ([txéːxòːɬtsʰótì]) when Coyote stole her two children.

When the people arrived in the Fourth or White World Niʼ Hodisxǫs ([nɪ̀ʔ xòtɪ̀sxõ̀s]), there were anaye (naayééʼ) living there. The Sacred Mountains were re-formed from soil taken from the original mountains in the Second World. First Man and the Holy People created the sun, moon, seasons, and stars. It was here that true death came into existence when Coyote tossed a stone into a lake, declaring that if it sank then the dead would go back to the previous world.

The first human born in the Fourth World is Yoołgaii Asdzą́ą́ ([jòːɬkɑ̀ì ɑ̀stsɑ̃́ː]), who matures into Asdzą́ą́ Nádleehé [ɑ̀stsɑ̃́ː nɑ́tɬèːxé] and, in turn, gives birth to the Hero Twins called Naayééʼ Neizghání and Tóbájíshchíní. The twins have many adventures in which they help to rid the world of various monsters. Multiple batches of modern humans were created a number of times in the Fourth World, and the Diyin Dineʼé gave them ceremonies which are still practiced today.

In other versions, there's another flood in the fourth world and humans are led through a big standing reed into the fifth world, which is where we live today, and where the Naayéé’ Nizghání are born to defeat the monsters.

== Main events and creations ==
=== The First World or Niʼ Hodiłhił ===
Of a time long ago these things are said. The first world was small, and black as soot. In the middle of the four seas there was an island floating in the mist. On the island grew a pine tree.

Dark ants dwelt there. Red ants dwelled there. Dragonflies dwelled there. Yellow beetles dwelled there. Hard beetles dwelled there. Stone-carrier beetles dwelled there. Black beetles dwelled there. Coyote-dung beetles dwelled there. Bats dwelled there. White-faced beetles dwelled there. Locusts dwelled there. White locusts dwelled there.

These were the twelve groups of the Níłchʼi Dineʼé, the Air-Spirit People, who lived in the First World.

Around the floating island were four seas. Each sea was ruled by a being. In the sea to the East dwelled Tééhoołtsódii, Big Water Creature, The One Who Grabs Things in the Water. In the sea to the south lived Táłtłʼááh álééh, Blue Heron. In the sea to the west dwelled Chʼał, Frog. In the ocean to the north dwelled Iiʼniʼ Jiłgaii, Winter Thunder.

Above each sea appeared a cloud. There was a black cloud, a white cloud, a blue cloud, and a yellow cloud. The Black Cloud contained the Female spirit of Life. The White Cloud contained the Male spirit of Dawn.

The Blue Cloud and the Yellow Cloud came together in the West, and a wind from the clouds blew. From the breath of wind, First Woman, Áłtsé Asdzą́ą́, was formed, and with her the yellow corn, perfect in shape, with kernels covering the whole ear. White shell, and turquoise, and yucca were there with her.

The Black Cloud and the White Cloud came together in the East, and the wind from the clouds blew. From the breath of wind, First Man, Áłtsé Hastiin, was formed and with him the white corn, Kóhonotʼíinii, perfect in shape, with kernels covering the whole ear. Crystal, symbol of the mind and clear seeing, was with him.

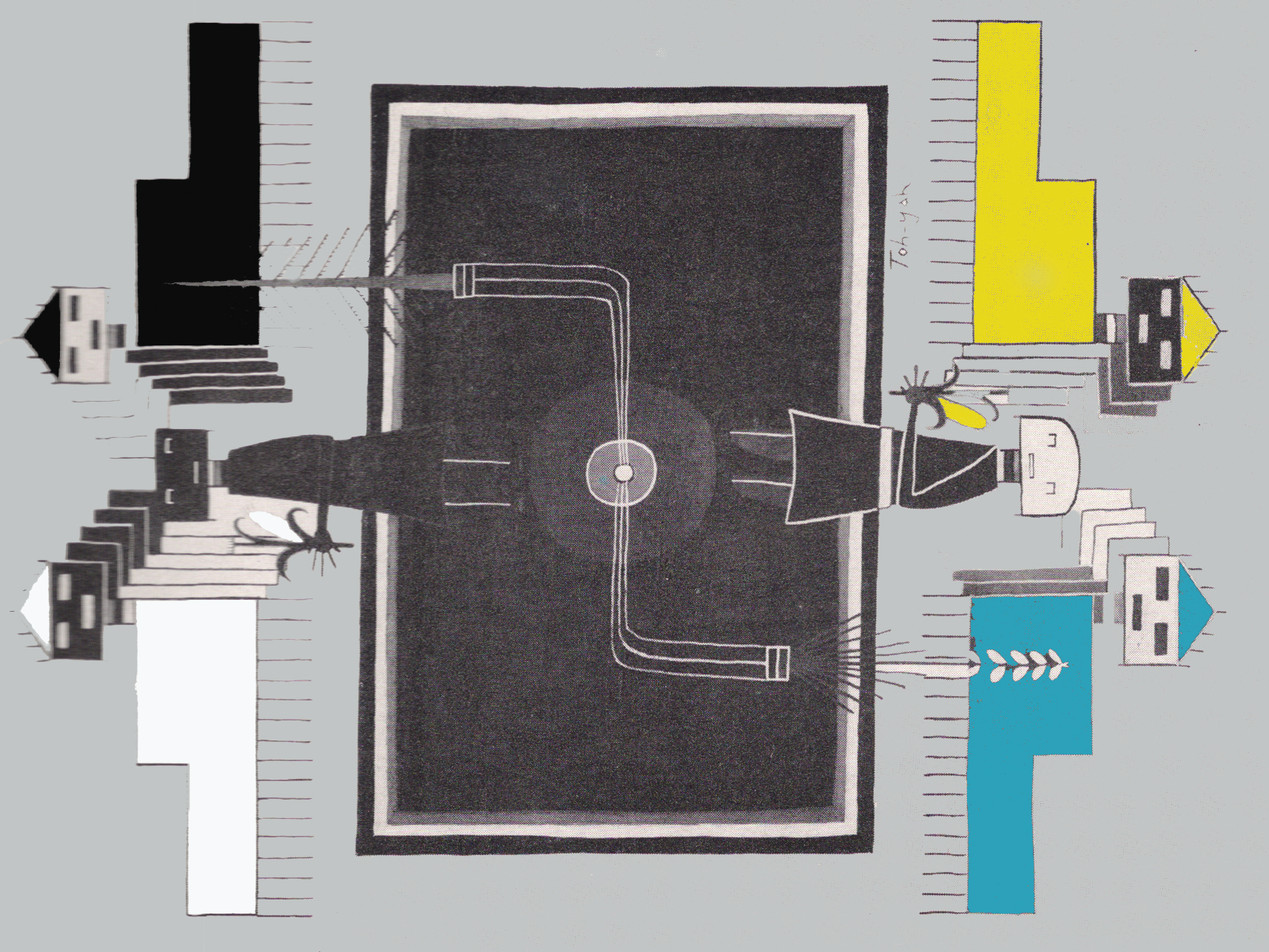
First Man between Black Cloud and White Cloud, and First Woman between Blue Cloud and Yellow Cloud

First Woman made a fire with her turquoise. First Man made a fire with his crystal. Its light was the mind's first awakening. They saw each other's light in the distance.

When the Blue Cloud and the Yellow Cloud rose high in the sky, First Woman saw the light of First Man's fire, and she went out to find it. Three times she was unsuccessful. The fourth time she found the home of First Man. "I wondered what this thing could be," she said. "I saw you walking and wondered why you did not come," First Man said. "Why do you not come with your fire, and we will live together." First Woman agreed to this. So instead of the man going to the woman, as is the custom now, the woman went to live with the man.

Another person, Mąʼiitoʼí Áłchíní [mɑ̃̀ʔìːtxòʔɪ́ ɑ́ɬtʃʰɪ́nɪ́], Great Coyote, was formed in the water. He told First Man and First Woman that he had been hatched from an egg, and knew all that was under the water and all that was in the skies. First Man believed him. Then a second coyote, Áłtsé Hashké, First Angry, appeared. He said to the three, "You believe that you were the first persons. You are mistaken. I was living when you were formed." First Angry brought witchcraft into the world.

The Air-Spirit People became jealous of one another and began to fight. The rulers of the four seas, Blue Heron, Frog, White Thunder, and Big Water Creature could stand it no more, and told the beings of the island that they must all leave this world. Some climbed and some flew until they came to an opening in the sky. They crawled through it and into the Second World.

=== The Second World or Niʼ Hodootłʼizh ===
First Woman, First Man, the Great-Coyote-Who-Was-Formed-in-the-Water, and the Coyote First Angry, followed by all the others, climbed up from the Dark World to the Second or Blue World.

After arriving to the second world, the insect people sent scouts, which were plain locusts, to see if they could find anyone in the area. The scouts were first sent to the east and after two days, they returned and had not found anyone or anything yet. The scouts were then sent south to explore and they were once again not able to find anyone or anything. The scouts were sent on two more trips and after they had returned from their fourth trip, the camp of the Air Spirit people was visited by the Swallow people.

They found a number of people already living there: bluebirds, blue hawks, bluejays, blue herons, and all the blue furred beings. The powerful swallow people lived there also. They lived in blue houses, scattered across a broad, blue plain. The houses were cone-shaped and they were tapered towards the top. The swallow people said to the Air-Spirit People, "You are welcome here among us." The Swallow people and Air-Spirit people then treated each other like they were all members of a single tribe, and for twenty-three days they all lived together in harmony. But on the night of the twenty-fourth day one of the Air-Spirit People approached the wife of the swallow chief and wished to sleep with her.

The next morning after finding out what happened the previous night, the Swallow Chief, Táshchozhii, said to the newcomers, "We welcomed you here among us. We treated you as kin. Yet this is how you return our kindness. Now you must leave this world." After the Chief told the Air-Spirit people that they must leave, he said “Anyhow, this is a bad land. There is not enough food for all of us. People are dying here every day from hunger. Even if we allowed you to stay, you could not live here very long." While in the second world, the Air-Spirit people still had not changed their way of life and they were not yet living in balance and harmony.

The Air-Spirit people wandered upward looking for a way into the next world. Niłchʼi, The Wind, called to them from the South. They followed him and found a slit in the sky that was upward slanted. The sky had a hard shell like the world they had previously been to. First Man created a wand of jet and other materials and the Air-Spirit people flew or walked upon it up into the next world. One by one they passed through to the other side.

=== The Third World or Niʼ Hałtsooí ===
The bluebird had joined the Air-Spirit People and was the first to reach the Third or Yellow World. After him came the First Four and all the others.

The great Female River crossed this land from north to south. The great Male River crossed the land from east to west. The rivers flowed through one another in the middle, and the name of this place is Tó Ałnáosdlį́į́, Crossing of the Waters.

In the Yellow World were six mountains. In the East was Sisnaajiní [sɪ̀snɑ̀ːtʃɪ̀nɪ́] Dawn, or White Shell Mountain. In the South was Tsoodził [tsʰòːtsɪ́ɬ] Blue Bead, or Turquoise Mountain. To the West was Dookʼoʼoosłííd [tòːkʼòʔóːsɬít] Abalone Shell Mountain. In the North was Dibé Nitsaa [tɪ̀pé nɪ̀tsʰɑ̀ː] Big Sheep Mountain. Near the Center of the Yellow World was Dził Náʼoodiłii, Soft Goods or Banded Rock Mountain. And near it, East of center, there was Chʼóolʼį́ʼí, Precious Stones, or Great Spruce Mountain.

Holy People lived on the mountains. They were immortal, and could travel by following the path of the rainbow and the rays of the sun. One was Haashchʼééłtiʼí, Talking God. His body was white. One was Tó Neinilí, Water Sprinkler. He was blue. One was Haashchʼééʼooghaan, House God. His body was yellow. One was Haashchʼééshzhiní, Black God, the god of fire. Beyond them to the east lived Turquoise Boy, who was a Nádleehi, neither male nor female, who guarded the great male reed. And far to the West, on Abalone Shell Mountain, lived Yoołgaii Asdzą́ą́ White Shell Girl, also a Nádleeh. With her was the big female reed, which grew at the water's edge with no tassel.

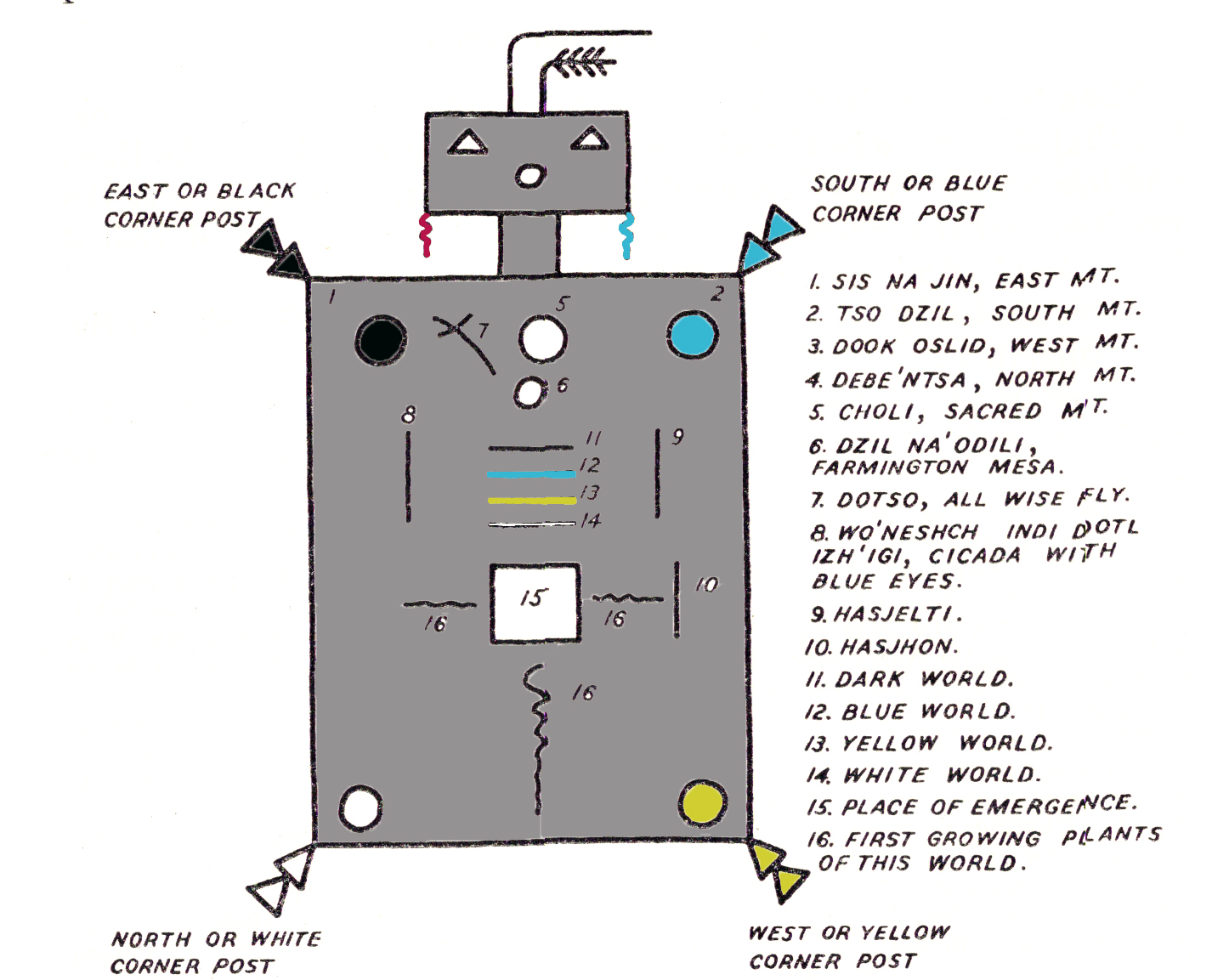
Drawing by Sam Ahkeak of sandpainting of Dinétah, the Navajo Homeland created by ceremonial leaders near Shiprock around 1930.

In the autumn, the four Holy People called to First Man and First Woman, and visited them, but they did not speak. Four days in a row they visited. On the fourth day, Black God said, "You must cleanse yourselves and we will return in twelve days."

First Man and First Woman bathed carefully and dried themselves with corn meal. They listened and waited. On the twelfth day the four Holy People returned. Water Sprinkler and Black God carried a sacred buckskin. Talking God carried two perfect ears of corn, with their points completely covered with kernels. One ear of corn was white, the male corn belonging to First Man. The other ear was yellow, the female corn belonging to First Woman. The gods placed one buckskin on the ground facing west, and on it they placed the two ears of corn with their tips pointing east. Under the white ear they put the feather of a white eagle. Under the yellow ear of corn they put the feather of a yellow eagle. They told the people to stand at a distance so that the wind could enter.

The White Wind, Níłchʼi Łigai blew between the buckskins, and while the wind blew, each of the Holy People walked four times around them, and the feathers were seen to move. In this way, they transformed First Man and First Woman from spirit people into human beings, with great powers. "Now," the Holy People said, "live here as husband and wife."

At the end of four days First Woman gave birth to twins. They were neither male nor female, but Nádleeh. Four days later a second set of twins was born, one male and one female. After twenty days a total of five pairs of twins had been born, half of them male and half of them female. Almost at once they were full grown. The Holy People took each set of twins to their home on the East Mountain and taught them how to wear masks and pray, and then returned them to their parents. Eight winters passed, and during that time the twins found mates with the Mirage People. Many people came into being.

==== Spider Grandmother, Spider-Woman, Spider-Man and Weaving ====
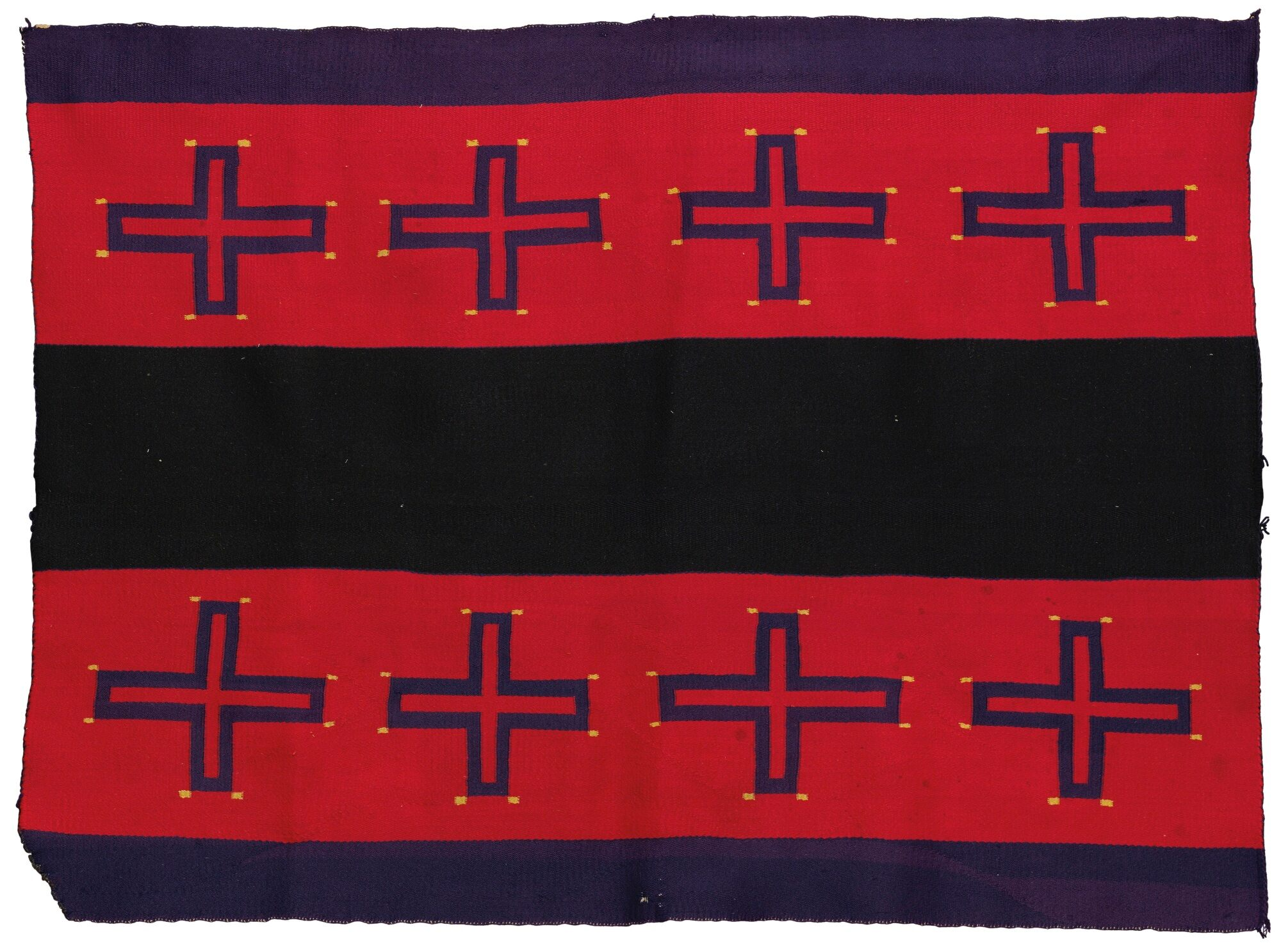
Transitional Navajo blanket composed of two rows of Spider Grandmother crosses flanking a broad central panel

Near Tó Ałnáosdlį́į́, Crossing of the Waters, lived Spider Woman and Spider Man. They knew how to weave the fibers of cotton and hemp and other plants. First Woman asked Spider Woman and Spider Man to teach people how to weave the fibers of plants so they would not have to depend on animal skins for clothing. Cotton seeds were planted, and the cotton was gathered. Spider Man taught the people to shape a little wheel, 3 or 4 inches in diameter, and put a slender stick through it to spin the cotton. First Woman said, "You must spin towards your person, not away, as you wish to have the beautiful goods come to you. If you spin away from you, the goods will depart from you." Spider Man named the spindle "yódí yił yaʼhote," meaning "turning around with the beautiful goods." Spider Woman said, "No, it shall be called nto is yił yaʼhote, turning around with the mixed chips."

After they had spun the thread they rolled it into good-sized balls, and brought straight poles and tied them to make a rectangular frame. Spider Man wound the thread on two of the poles from east to west, over and under the poles. Then Spider Man said that the ball of thread should be called "yódí yił nasmas aghaaʼ," meaning "rolling with the beautiful goods." Spider Woman said, "No, it shall be called ntsilí yił nasmas aghaaʼ, rolling with the mixed chips."

After the loom was finished the cross poles were erected and other poles placed on the ground to hold the loom frame solidly, and the loom was stretched into place. Spider Man said, "It shall be called yótí ilth na daiʼdi, raising with the beautiful goods." Spider Woman said, "No, it shall be called niltłʼiz na daiʼdi, raising with the mixed chips."

There was a notched stick running across, with a notch holding every other thread. Spider Man said, "It will be called yódí bił nesłon, looping with the beautiful goods." Spider Woman said, "No, it shall be called niltłʼliz bił nesłon, looping with the mixed chips." Then they used a narrow stick about two and a half feet long, and wound the yarn or thread over it, and where there is no design they ran it along. That was given the same name as the ball of thread. They used the wide flat stick for tapping down the thread. Spider Man said, "It shall be called yódí naʼygolte;" but Spider Woman said, "It shall be called niltłʼiz naʼygolte."

Spider Man then said, "Now you know all that I have named for you. It is yours to work with and to use following your own wishes. But from now on when a baby girl is born to your tribe you shall go and find a spider web woven at the mouth of some hole; you must take it and rub it on the baby's hand and arm. Thus, when she grows up she will weave, and her fingers and arms will not tire from the weaving."

==== The Separation of Women and Men ====
One day, First Man brought home a fine deer that he had killed. First Woman said, "I thank my vagina for this deer." First Man demanded to know what she meant. "I mean that you bring me food because you wish to have sex with me," she said. "But we women could live happily without men. We are the ones who gather the food and till the fields. We have no need of men." First Man grew angry and called all the men together. "The women think they can live without us," he told them. "Let us see if that is true."

The men and the two hermaphrodite twins crossed the river to the north bank carrying the grinding stones and bowls and baskets that the hermaphrodite twins had made, and the axes and hoes that the men had invented. The women bared themselves along the bank of the river and called out to the men, saying "See what you are missing?" There were occasionally men and women who so longed after the other that some jumped into the river that separated them in a vain attempt to reunite with their loved ones. Unfortunately the currents of the river were too strong and the swimmers were washed down the river, never to be seen again.

For four years the women and the men lived apart. During this time the food that the women harvested became less, because they had no tools, while the men grew more and more food. But each group longed for the other. The women sought to satisfy themselves with bones and feathers and long stones. The men tried to relieve their longing with the fresh meat of animals. One man, Kʼíídeesdizí, tried to satisfy himself using the liver of a deer. Owl called out to him to stop. "This is wrong," Owl said. "No good can come of this separation. You must bring the men and the women together again." As it turns out Owl was right. From the women who had sought to satisfy themselves with foreign objects, monsters were born out of this. The monsters would go on to terrorize the people wherever they roamed.

Kʼíídeesdizí spoke to the other men. Finally they all spoke to First Man. First Man called across the river to First Woman, and asked, "Do you still think you can live alone?" "I no longer believe I can," she responded. "I am sorry I let the things you said make me angry," First Man said. And then the men sent a raft to the women's side of the river to bring the women across. The men and women bathed and dried their bodies with corn meal, and remained apart until nightfall. Then they would resume their lives together.

==== Big Water Creature (Tééhoołtsódii) and the Great Flood ====
But a mother and her two daughters had been in the fields and had not seen the raft. Now it was dark, and they saw that all of the women had crossed the river to the men's side. They began to swim across. But Tééhoołtsódii, Big Water Creature, grabbed the two daughters and dragged them to her home under the water. For three days and three nights, the people searched the river for the girls, but they could not find them.

On the morning of the fourth day, Talking God and Water Sprinkler appeared with a large bowl of white shell and a large bowl of blue shell. The people gathered around them. They placed the bowls at the water's edge, and started to spin them. The spinning bowls created an opening in the water which led downward to a large house with four rooms. First Man and First Woman traveled down the passage and into the house, and behind them crept the Coyote named First Angry. In the north room of the house, they found Big Water Creature asleep in a chair. Her own two children were there, and also the two missing daughters. First Man and First Woman took the hands of the girls and led them back through the passage and on to the bank. Behind them, Coyote carried the two children of Big Water Creature, wrapped in his big skin coat with white fur lining. There was great celebrating because the lost girls were returned.

The next morning, animals began running past the village from the east. Deer ran by, and turkeys, and antelopes, and squirrels. For three days, animals ran past, fleeing from something. On the morning of the fourth day, the people sent locusts flying to the east to find out what was happening. The locusts returned and told that a great wall of water was coming from the east, and a tide of water from the north and from the south. The people ran to the top of the mountain Sisnaajiní. First Man ran to each of the other Sacred Mountains, took dirt from each, and summoned the Holy People, and returned to Sisnaajiní. Turquoise Boy came bearing the great Male Reed, and First Man planted it in the top of the mountain. All the people began to blow on the reed, and it began to grow and grow until it reached the canopy of the sky. Woodpecker hollowed out a passage inside the reed, and the people and Turquoise Boy and the four Holy People all began to climb up until they came out in the Fourth World.

=== The Fourth World ===
In Mescalito et al., the niłch’í dineé arrived into a fourth world, which was red. In this world they found the k’isáani or the Pueblos. In this world the First Woman and First Man were created, along with their children, the bigger animals, pottery, and many other things. The only thing that was missing was some of the mountains. There was a flood that led the niłch’í dinée, k’isáani, and the people to a reed where they stood for 24 days until they arrived to the Fifth world, the bright world.

=== The Fourth / Fifth World or Niʼ Hodisxǫs ===
After the people had all emerged into the Fourth, or White World, they saw the water continuing to rise in the Third World beneath them. In Mescalito et al., the White World is, in reality, the Fifth World.

Big Water Creature pushed her head through the opening in the reed. Her curly hair floated on the water, and lightning flashed from her black horn and her yellow horn. First Man asked Big Water Creature why she had come. She said nothing. But the Coyote named First Angry came forward wearing his skin coat. He said "Perhaps it is because of this," and drew the two babies from under his coat. Turquoise Boy took a basket and filled it with turquoise. On top of the turquoise he placed the blue pollen from blue flowers and yellow pollen from the corn, and pollen from water flags, and on top of these he placed the crystal, which is river pollen. This basket he gave to Coyote, who put it between the horns of the Big Water Creature, and on the basket he placed the two children. The Big Water Creature disappeared down into the reed, and the water with her.

They saw that they were on an island in the middle of a bubbling lake, surrounded by high cliffs. At first the people could not find a way to get across the water to the shore. They called on Water Sprinkler to help them. He had brought four great stones with him from the Third World. He threw one to the east. When it hit the cliff wall, it broke a hole through it, and water began to flow out of the lake. He threw a stone to the south. He threw one to the west. And to the north he threw one. Each stone created a hole in the cliff, and the water of the lake became lower. A lane now connected the island to the shore to the east, but it was deep with mud. The people called on Níłchʼi Dilkǫǫh, Smooth Wind, to help them. He blew steadily for a long time, and finally the people were able to leave the island.

First Man and First Woman built a hogan to live in. It was not like a hogan of today. First Man dug a shallow pit in the earth and placed poles in it. For the main poles he used two parts of the Black Bow, Ałtį́į́ʼ Diłhił. One pole he cut from the Male Reed. One pole he cut from the Female Reed. The structure was covered with earth and grass. First Woman ground white corn and they powdered the poles and sprinkled corn meal inside the dwelling from East to West. First Man said, "May my home be sacred and beautiful, and may the days be beautiful and plenty." This was the first hogan-raising ceremony. According to Mescalito et al., all this happened in the fifth world.

==== Creation of Sun and Moon ====
Inside, First Man lay with his head to the East, and First Woman lay with her head to the West. Their thoughts mingled, and those thoughts were sacred. They began to plan for the time that was to come, and how people would live on the earth. Great Coyote-Who-Was-Formed-in-the-Water came in to help them plan. Together, they planned that there should be a sun, a moon, and day and night. They decided to keep the other Coyote, First Angry, away from their planning, because it was he who had brought unhappiness. According to Mescalito et al. all this happened in the fourth world.

First Man, First Woman, and Great-Coyote-Who-Was-Formed-in-the-Water covered the floor of the hogan with a perfect buckskin. On the buckskin the placed a perfect round turquoise, larger than the height of a man. Below the turquoise they placed a great perfect white shell. At that moment the Coyote Áłtsé Hashké, First Angry, came and asked them what they were doing. "Nothing," they said. "So I see," he said. And he went away.

First Man went looking for Haashchʼééshzhiní, The Black Yéʼii, known as the Fire God. First Man found him in a place where there was fire under the earth, and called to him. He returned to the first hogan with First Man. First Man and First Woman also summoned the other three Holy People, Water Sprinkler, House God, and Talking God. Together, they told Turquoise Boy and White Shell Girl that they were creating the sun and the moon. They asked Turquoise Boy if he would become the sun, and they asked White Shell Girl if she would become the moon. Again, the Coyote named First Angry came by and asked them what they were doing. "Nothing," they said. "So I see," he said, and he went away.

First Man, First Woman, Great Coyote, and the Holy People planned that there would be 12 months. With each month, the moon would pass from dark to light, and the sun would move to a different path in the sky. White Shell Girl was given a whistle made from the Female Reed, with 12 holes in it. Each time she completed her cycle she would blow on the whistle, and a new month would begin. The first month was named Ghąąjįʼ, Back-to-Back, or Parting of the Seasons. Today it is called October. The second month was named Níłchʼitsʼósí, Time of Slender Winds. The third month was Níłchʼitsoh, Great Wind. It is the time to begin to tell the sacred stories. The fourth month, January, was Yas Niłtʼees, Crusted Snow. This is the month of many ceremonies, and the time for sacred stories. February, the fifth month, is Atsá Biyáázh, Baby Eagle. After this month, sacred stories must not be told to the young people. The sixth month, Wóózhchʼį́į́d, is the month of Sudden Spring Storms. Ceremonies are held to bless the fields before seeds are planted. The seventh month was Tʼą́ą́chil, Little Leaves. May, Tʼą́ą́tsoh, was the eighth month. Finally they planned Yaʼiishjááshchilí, When-Few-Seeds-Ripen, Jáátsoh, Great Seed Ripening, Biniʼantʼą́ą́tsʼózí, Little Ripening, and finally September, Biniʼantʼą́ą́tsoh, Harvest Time, when foods are stored for the winter.

Again, the Coyote named First Angry came by and asked what they were doing. "Nothing," they said. "So I see," he said, and he went away.

Fire God, the Black Yéʼii, used his fire to heat the turquoise on the buckskin until it became red hot. Then they asked Turquoise Boy to enter the glowing turquoise. "If I do that, I must be paid with the lives of the people of the earth, all the human beings, the animals which have four legs, the birds and insects of the air, the fishes and all the people under the water." And then the White Shell Girl repeated the same thing. First Woman, First Man, Great Coyote, and the Holy People all agreed. Then Turquoise Boy entered the glowing Turquoise. First Man used his crystal to heat the White Shell, and White Shell Girl entered the White Shell. Four circles were made around the inside of the hogan to complete the ceremony. In this way, Turquoise Boy became the sun, Jóhonaaʼéí, The One Who Rules the Day. And White Shell Girl became the moon, Tłʼéhonaaʼéí, The One Who Rules the Night. Níłchʼi Haʼaʼaahdę́ęʼgo, the East Wind, asked to carry the newly formed sun to his land so that it could begin its journey there.

The Coyote named First Angry appeared again. He said, "I know you have been planning great things. I demand to know why I was not included in the planning." First Man and First Woman said nothing. Coyote said, "You believe that I spoiled your living in the lower worlds, but it is not true. Now I will spoil your plans. The path of the sun and the path of the moon will not return to their beginning after 12 months. The twelve months of the sun will be 13 months of the moon. Sometimes frost will come early, and sometimes it will remain late. Sometimes the rains will not come, and you will have to summon the baby of the Big Water Creature to bring water." And he left them.

==== The Coming of Death ====
According to Mescalito et al., this is what starts happening in the fifth world. Late in the first day, when Jóhonaaʼéí was finishing his first journey across the sky, one of the hermaphrodite twins, Nádleeh, stopped breathing. Afraid, the people left her alone. In the morning, the Coyote named First Angry and the people went to find the twin, but Nádleeh was gone. One man looked down the reed into the Third World, and there he saw Nádleeh sitting by the side of the river combing her hair. He called to his friend, and he looked and also saw her. The people asked Coyote what to do. He took a black rock, tadzootsé, and threw it into Tódiłhił, the Black Water Lake. He said that if the rock came up and floated, the spirit of the dead person would return to the Fourth World and there would be no death. If the rock sank, the spirit would stay in the world below and there would be death. The rock sank, and the people knew then that the twin was dead, and First Man remembered the agreement they had made with the sun. Four days later the two witnesses who had looked down on the dead twin also died. The people learned that it is dangerous to look at the dead. The people were all angry with Coyote for this and gathered around to beat him. Coyote said they could beat him, but first he had something to say. "I threw the rock in the water knowing that it would sink." The people darkly muttered about this to one another, the whole of them deciding that Coyote really did deserve a good beating. But quick thinking Coyote finished his explanation. "Without death the world would soon be overpopulated. The elders would never die and would stay stuck in their infirm bodies. There would be no room for new children. We would run out of food and shelter with so many people to feed and care for." The gathered group was silent for a bit while all of them contemplated Coyote's rationale and found him to be wise and intelligent.

==== Stars and Constellations ====
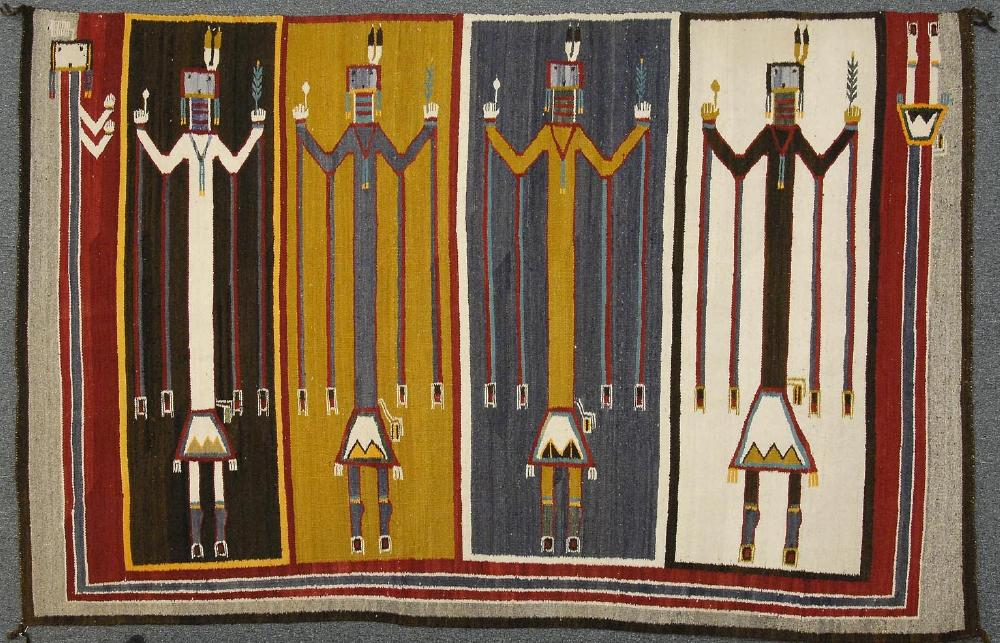
Pictorial weaving representing Ye'ii entities, Navajo, c.1920-1930

First Man, First Woman, Great Coyote, and the Holy People next planned stars for the night sky. They gathered as many pieces of tsésǫʼ, rock-star mica, as they could find, and put them on a blanket. Then First Man made a drawing in the dirt to plan the location of all the stars seeking to make the sky like a woven rug, orderly and balanced. Haashchʼééshzhiní, Black Yéʼii, placed the Sǫʼtsoh (North Star). First Man placed the Náhookǫs [bikąʼí] (Big Dipper) while First Woman put the Náhookǫs [baʼáádí] (Little Dipper) into the sky. First Man also placed the Dilyéhé (Seven Stars, the Pleiades) which Black Yéʼii claimed represented parts of his body. They placed Áłtséʼétsoh, the Big First One. They placed Áłtséʼétsʼósí, Coyote's Feather, or the Slender One (the belt and sword of Orion). They placed Baʼáłchíní, the children of Dilyéhé and Áłtséʼétsʼósí; and Hastiin Sikʼaiʼí, The-Old-Man-with Feet Apart; and the Rabbit Tracks, Gah Atʼéʼii; and Yikáí Sidáhí Moving-toward-the-Dawn; and Náhookǫs Bakąʼí, The-Revolving-Male-Warrior-with-His-Bow-and-Arrow; and his wife, Náhookǫs Baʼáádí, Who-Carries-the-Fire-in-Her-Basket. The Coyote named First Angry returned to see what was going on. He took a piece of rock-star mica and placed it on the sky, and it became Mąʼii bizǫʼ, known by Bilagáana as Canopus. He placed another piece in the south, Sǫʼ Doo Nidisidí, Morning Star. Then Coyote said, "This is too long. I have a better way." He then snapped the blanket and the rest of the rock-star mica was scattered across the sky.

==== The Re-Creation of the Sacred Mountains ====
Áłtsé hastiin, First Man, and Áłtsé asdzą́ą́, First Woman, together with Tó Neinilí, Water Sprinkler, and Haashchʼééshzhiní, Black Yéʼii, the god of fire, set out to create the six sacred mountains from dirt that First Man had brought up from each mountain in the third world. They placed them as they had been in the third world. They re-created Sisnaajiní, Dawn, or White Shell Mountain, in the East. They decorated it with white shells. They decorated it with white lightning. They decorated it with white corn. They decorated it with dark clouds that make male rain. From stones they had brought they fashioned Tséghádiʼnídíinii Ashkii, Rock Crystal Boy, and Tséghádiʼnídíinii atʼééd, Rock Crystal Girl, to reside there forever.

In the South they re-created Tsoodził, Blue Bead, or Turquoise Mountain. They adorned it with turquoise. They adorned it with dark mist. They adorned it with animals. They adorned it with light clouds that bring female rain. From two stones they had brought with them they fashioned Dootłʼizhii Náyooʼałí Ashkii, the Boy Who Is Bringing Back Turquoise, and Naadą́ą́ʼ ląʼí Náyooʼáłí Atʼééd, the Girl Who Is Bringing Back Many Ears of Corn. They were created to reside there forever.

To the West they re-created Dookʼoʼoosłííd, Abalone Shell Mountain. They adorned it with haliotis shell. They adorned it with animals. They adorned it with dark clouds that bring the male rain. From material from the Third World they created Naadą́ą́łgaii Ashkii, the White Corn Boy, and Naadą́ą́łtsoii Atʼééd, the Yellow Corn Girl. They were created to reside there forever.

In the North they re-created Dibé Nitsaa, Big Mountain Sheep. They adorned that mountain with black beads. They adorned it with many plants. They adorned it with many animals. They adorned it with the grey mist that brings female rain. From materials from below, they fashioned Tádídíín Ashkii, Pollen Boy, and Nahachagii Atʼééd, Grasshopper Girl. They were created to reside there forever.

Near the Center they re-created Dził Náʼoodiłii, Soft Goods or Banded Rock Mountain. They left its summit bare, but they created two beings to reside there. They were Yódí Neidiitsi Ashkii, Boy Who Produces Goods, and Yódí Neidiitsi Atʼééd, Girl Who Produces Goods.

East of center they re-created Chʼóolʼį́ʼí, Precious Stones, or Great Spruce Mountain. They decorated it with pollen and the clouds that bring female rain. On it they created two beings, Nitłʼiz Neidiitsi Ashkii, the Boy Who Produces Jewels, and Nitłʼiz Neidiitsi Atʼééd, the Girl Who Produces Jewels, to live there forever.

When all was done, First Man, First Woman, Black Yéʼii and Water Sprinkler returned and taught the people about the sacred mountains. They taught them that these six mountains were their principal mountains. From the lower mesa lands they could see them. Chants were made for them. Finally, a smoke was prepared for the mountains and the chants were sung.

=== The Coming of Monsters ===
In the Third World, there was a time when men and women had lived apart for a long time. During that time, some women had used animal horns or long stones or bird feathers for sex. Now, in the Fourth World, some of those women were pregnant. One woman who had used an antelope horn gave birth to a child with no head. The people held a council and decided that this baby would be abandoned. It was left to die in a gully. But it lived and grew to become Déélgééd, the Horned Monster.

A woman who had used an eagle's feather for sex gave birth to a round, headless child with feathered shoulders. A council was held, and it was decided that this baby too should be abandoned. It was left in an alkali pit. But it lived, and grew to become Tsé Nináhálééh, Monster Eagle. It made its home on Tséteʼiská, a peak beyond La Plata Mountains.

A woman who had used an elongated stone for sex gave birth to a headless child with hard skin and a pointed neck. The people met in council and decided that this baby should be abandoned in a fissure in a cliff. They placed the child and closed the fissure with rocks. But the child lived and grew to become Tsé dah Hódziiłtáłii, The Monster Who Kicks People Down the Cliff. It made its home at a place called Knol ghi nee, beyond the Carrizos Mountains.

A woman who had skinned a sour cactus and used it for sex gave birth to twins, headless creatures with no limbs. They had two depressions at the top that looked like eyes. The people gathered and decided that these infants had to be abandoned. They threw them as far as they could. But the twins found shelter in brush and survived. They grew to become Binááʼ yee Aghání, the Monsters That Kill with Their Eyes.

One monster came about in a different way. A woman named Loose Running Woman went off alone in the direction of the sunrise. After defecating, she used a smooth pebble from the river to clean herself. She placed the warm stone in her genitals just as Jóhonaaʼéí, the Sun, rose above the horizon. Seeing this, the Sun sent a ray into her. In only nine days she gave birth to a large child. Having no husband, and not knowing who the father of the child was, she abandoned the child in a rocky place. But Jóhonaaʼéí knew that the baby was his, and he protected it from afar but never visited it. The child grew to be large and powerful and very angry. It was called Yéʼiitsoh, Big Giant, by the people.

The monsters hid along paths, and killed and devoured travelers. They killed many people, and the people began to live in fear.

==== The Monster Slayer Twins ====
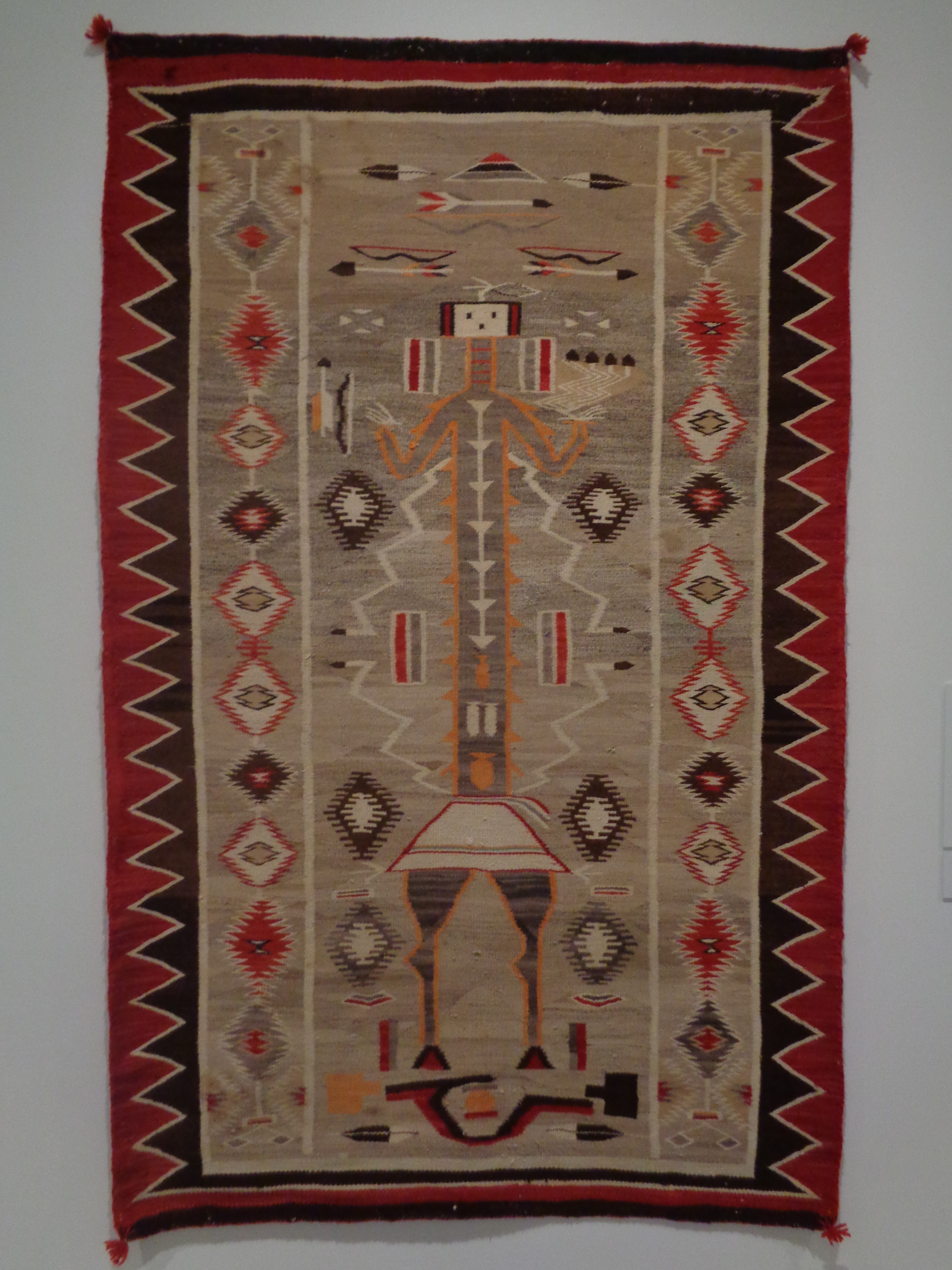
Monster slayer rug, c.1920s

Most of the people had been killed. First Man said, "Perhaps the Holy People will help us." In the morning, he saw a dark cloud covering the top of Chʼóolʼį́ʼí, the Great Spruce Mountain. In the night he saw a fire on the mountain. He said to First Woman, "Someone is there. I must go to them." "No," she said. "There are many monsters between here and there. It is not safe for you." The following day the dark cloud remained on the mountain, and at night the fire appeared a second time. This happened the third day as well. On the fourth day, First Man said, "I must go. I believe there is a Holy Person on the mountain who can help us." He set out for Chʼóolʼį́ʼí. As he walked, he sang: I am Áłtsé Hastiin, and I head for Chʼóolʼį́ʼí in pursuit of old age and happiness. In pursuit of old age and happiness I follow the lightning and approach the place where it strikes. In pursuit of old age and happiness I follow the rainbow and approach the place where it touches the earth. In pursuit of old age and happiness I follow the dark cloud's trail and approach the place where it is thickest. In pursuit of old age and happiness I follow the scent of the rain, and approach the place where the lines of rain are darkest.

At the very summit of Chʼóolʼį́ʼí, he heard the cry of an infant and the crash of lightning, the pouring of rain, and he saw the tip of a rainbow with intense colors in front of the black sky. Suddenly the rain stopped and the sky became light. Where he had heard the cry of a baby there was a turquoise figure of a girl lying on the ground. First Man picked up the turquoise girl and carried it home with him.

==== The Birth of Changing Woman ====
Two days later First Man and First Woman were awakened very early in the morning by the sound "Wu'hu'hu'hu'." They knew it was Haashch'ééłti'í, Talking God. He told them they must return to the top of Chʼóolʼį́ʼí with the turquoise figure in twelve days.

Mask representing Haashchʼééłtiʼí, Talking God, used in Night Chant Ceremony, recorded by Matthews in 1902

When they reached a level spot just below the summit ofChʼóolʼį́ʼí, Haashchʼééłtiʼí was there waiting for them. Haashchʼééʼooghaan, House God, was there. Tó Neinilí, Water Sprinkler, was there. With them was Níłchʼi, the Wind. Haashchʼééłtiʼí lay a perfect buckskin on the ground with its head facing the west. On the buckskin First Man lay the turquoise figure of a girl with her head to the west. Then Haashchʼééłtiʼí placed another perfect buckskin over the figure, with its head facing East. The Holy People began to sing the sacred song of Hózhǫ́ǫ́jí Sin, and Níłchʼi, the Wind entered between the buckskin blankets. The upper blanket was removed, and beneath it was a living baby girl. Her name was Asdzą́ą́ Nádleehé, Changing Woman. The Holy People told First Man and First Woman to take her to their home and raise her as their daughter.

First Woman and First man carried Asdzą́ą́ Nádleehé to their hogan, and First Man made a cradle board and tied her in it. "Now she will be my daughter," he said. First woman took the baby and breathed on her four times. "Now," she said, "she will be my daughter." At the end of the second day the baby laughed for the first time. The Coyote named Áłtsé Hashké arrived and said, "I was told that my grandchild laughed for the first time." First Woman took charcoal and gave it to the Coyote saying: "This is the only thing that lasts." He painted his nose with it and said, "I shall know all things. I shall live long by it." Satisfied with the gift, he departed. Since then persons always receive a gift when a baby laughs for the first time, and the First Laugh Ceremony is performed.

By the thirteenth day, Asdzą́ą́ Nádleehé had become a young woman, and on that day she said to First Woman, "Something unusual has passed through me." First woman said, "That is your first race, kinaashdaah." They covered the floor of the hogan with blankets, and Changing Woman lay on them face down. First Man pulled her hair down, and shaped her face, and dressed her in beautiful goods, beads, bracelets, and earrings, and tied her hair with a strip of perfect buckskin. Then First Man and First Woman stepped outside the hogan and told Asdzą́ą́ Nádleehé to run her first race around a cedar tree and return, from east to west, as the sun does. When she returned, they invited all the people to a sing over her in the hogan called Hooghan Hotłʼeztsoos, Changeable House, on the mountain called Dził Náʼodiłii four days later. A great crowd gathered in the evening of the fourth day. A sweet corn cake was made from different colored corn meal sweetened with yeast. The Night Chant was sung, and in the morning the men received some of the maiden's cake as a gift for their chants, and Asdzą́ą́ Nádleehé, Changing Woman sat in the back of the hogan as gifts were piled in front of her. In this way the First Race of every young woman should be celebrated.

==== Birth of the Twins ====
Soon after that, Changing Woman wished for a mate. Every morning when the sun rose she lay on her back until noon, her head to the west and her feet to the east. At noon she went to the spring. She lay under the ledge and let spring water drip over her body. This took place each day for four days. On the fourth day, she heard a sound behind her and turned and saw a young man on a great white horse with black eyes. It had a long white mane, and pranced above the ground and not on the earth itself. The bridle and the saddle were white. The young man's moccasins and leggings were also white. The rider spoke: "You lay towards me each morning until noon. When I am half over the center of the earth, you go to the spring. Your wish could not have two meanings. Go home and tell your father to build a brush hogan to the south of your home. Fill a basket with meal and set it in the hogan. Make a line of pollen from east to west across the basket on top of the meal. Make a line of pollen from north to south drawn around the basket. You and your father must sit there late into the night. He will then go home to his wife and you must stay there alone."

Changing Woman returned home and told what had happened to her parents. First Man said that it could not be true, but First Woman said that it was indeed the message of a Holy Being and they must obey. And so First Man and Asdzą́ą́ Nádleehé prepared the hogan and the basket and waited long into the night. Finally First Man returned home. When Changing Woman returned home in the morning, First Man asked her at once: "Who came last night?" The girl said, "No one came, but some of the meal has been taken." The same thing happened the second night, and the third. On the morning after the fourth night, the girl told First Man, "I saw no one, but someone touched me, and I was moved." Four days later, Asdzą́ą́ Nádleehé said, "Mother, something moves within me." First Woman answered, "Daughter, that must be your baby moving."

On the ninth day, Changing Woman felt her birth labor begin. Talking God appeared, carrying a rope of sunbeam. Water Sprinkler the Rain God appeared carrying a rope of rainbow. Saying nothing, the two beings gave one end of each rope to Changing Woman and silently bid her pull them with each spasm of labor. This began the custom of giving a rope to a woman who is in labor. A baby boy emerged, and Talking God took it aside and washed it, and severed its cord. A second baby boy emerged, and Water Sprinkler took it aside and washed it and severed its cord.

==== Preparation of the Twins ====
After four days, Haashchʼééłtiʼí, Talking God, and Tó Neinilí, Water Sprinkler, returned. The twins had already grown into big boys. "Shinálí (Grandsons)," Talking God said, "We have come to run a race with you." "We will see how fit you have become," said Water Sprinkler. They agreed to race around the mountain. The boys ran fast, and the two Holy People ran slower. But soon the boys became tired and the Holy People came up behind them and began taunting them and whipping them with switches of mountain mahogany. As they approached home, Talking God and Water Sprinkler ran past them and won the race. "We will return in four days to race again," they said, and departed. In the evening, the boys were sore and tired. Níłchʼi, the Wind came to them and said, "Practice each day and grow stronger." In four days, Talking God and Water Sprinkler returned, and the four raced again around the mountain. It was a faster pace, but just as before, Talking God and Water Sprinkler ran just behind the twins and whipped them with switches. Again the Holy People said they would return in four days to race again. And again in the evening Niłchʼi came and encouraged them and urged them to train. Each day the boys trained, and in the third race, Talking God and Water Sprinkler no longer whipped the twins, but had to run their strongest to win the race at the end. Four days later they returned to race a final time. Again, the boys started very fast, but this time they did not tire and slow their pace. They led the whole way and won the race. "Well done, Shinálí," said Talking God and Water Sprinkler. "You have grown into what we wanted you to become. Now you can serve well those who have nurtured you."

The twins came to Changing Woman, Asdzą́ą́ Nádleehé, and asked, "Mother, who is our father?" "You have no father," she said. "We must have a father," replied the twins. "We need to know who he is." "Your father is a round cactus, then," said Changing Woman. "Be still."

First Man made bows and arrows for the twins, and they traveled to the south to hunt. They saw a large black bird on a tree, and tried to hit it with an arrow, but it flew away. When they told Changing Woman this, she said, "That was Raven, and he may be a spy for Tsé Nináhálééh, the Monster Bird, who devours our people. Do not go there again." The following day the boys took their bows and headed west. They saw a large black bird with a red head, and tried to kill it, but it flew away. When they told Changing Woman this, she said, "That was Vulture. He may be a spy for Tsédah Hódziiłtáłii, the Monster that Kicks People Down Cliffs. Do not go there again." The next day they boys traveled north, and there they saw a black and white bird with a piercing voice. They tried to shoot it with their arrows, but it flew away. When they told their mother, she said, "That was Magpie. He is a spy for Binááʼ yee Aghání, the Monster Who Kills With His Eyes. If he sees you he will paralyze you with his eyes and peck you to pieces." Changing Woman cried, "Now the monsters know about you, and they will come to kill you. You must stay inside."

The next morning Changing Woman climbed a hill. Looking in the distance she saw many monsters approaching from the south and from the west and from the north. She made four sacred hoops. The white one she threw to the east. The blue one she threw to the south. The yellow one she threw to the west. The black one she threw to the north. At once a strong wind began to circle the hogan. "The wind is too strong for the monsters to enter," she told her sons. We will be safe for one day. But tomorrow the power will be gone." At night, the twins spoke softly to one another. "The monsters are coming for us," they said. "We must leave so the others will be safe." Before dawn, they left and ran down the holy path to the east.

==== The Journey to the Sun ====
By daybreak the twins were approaching the sacred mountain called Dził Náʼoodiłii. They saw smoke rising from the ground, and saw that it came from an underground chamber with a ladder extending. When they looked down into the entrance they saw an old woman sitting before a small fire. It was Naʼashjéʼii Asdzą́ą́, Spider Woman. "Enter, shiyáázh (my sons)," she said in a raspy voice. "Who are you and why do you walk on Atiin diyinii, the trail of the rainbow?" The boys entered. "We do not know who we are, and we do not know where we are going," said the twins. "We are fleeing for our lives." "You must tell me more," said Spider Woman. "Asdzą́ą́ Nádleehé, Changing Woman, is our mother, and we flee Naayééʼ, the Alien Monsters," said the boys. "You are welcome here, and you can learn much from me," said Spider Woman. "But you must tell me more." "We are yátashkii, raised without a father," the twins said. "Perhaps our father is a round cactus. We follow the Holy Trail because the monsters will destroy us if they can."

Naʼashjéʼii Asdzą́ą́, Spider Woman, stood and extended her arms. "I will tell you who your father is and how to go to him," she said, and she gestured to the first twin to sit on a chair of obsidian and to the second twin to sit on a chair of turquoise. She gave them food. Then she said, "Your father is Jóhonaaʼéí, the Sun. His dwelling is far to the east. The way is long and dangerous. Many monsters live between here and there. And your father may try to harm you." "Tell us how to go there," said the twins. "You must cross four dangerous places," said Spider Woman. You must pass the rocks that crush all travelers. You must cross the reeds that cut travelers to pieces. You must cross between the cane cactuses that cut travelers to shreds. Then you must pass the boiling sands that burn travelers to fine ashes. Beyond those four points no ordinary creature can pass. But I will give you a talisman that will help you." Saying this, she handed the boys the sacred naayééʼ atsʼos, a hoop fashioned from the life feathers of monster eagles. "Treat this charm carefully and use it correctly," she said. "As you face your enemies, stare at them without fear, and extend the naayééʼ atsʼos towards them. Then repeat this song: "Rub your feet with pollen and rest them. Rub your hands with pollen and rest them. Rub your body with pollen and lie at rest. Rub your head with pollen and put your mind to rest. Then truly your feet become pollen. Your hands become pollen. Your body becomes pollen. Your head becomes pollen. Your spirit will then become pollen. Your voice will then become pollen. All of you is as pollen is. And what pollen is, that is what peace is. The trail ahead is now a beautiful trail. Long life is ahead. Happiness is ahead." "Now," she said, "You are ready to go on. You have the power that you need. Walk in beauty."

The twins continued east on the Trail of the Rainbow until they came to a narrow pass between two high cliffs. The cliffs pulled apart as they approached. They walked quickly to the opening and stopped suddenly, and the cliffs slammed together in front of them. "We are the children of Jóhonaaʼéí, the Sun," the twins called. We go to him with a message from Spider Woman." "Tell us the message," called a voice. The boys held out the naayééʼ atsʼos and sang the song Spider Woman had taught them. The cliffs parted, and the twins passed safely between them. Next they came to the slashing reeds, and again they held out the naayééʼ atsʼos and sang the holy song, and passed safely through. They came next to the cane cactuses, Hosh Ditsáhiitsoh, which sprang to life as they approached. Again with the naayééʼ atsʼos and the song of Spider Woman they passed through safely. At last they came to Séítʼáád, the Boiling Dunes, which began to swirl and boil when they approached. "We must know who you are and where you come from and where you are going and to what purpose," roared the dunes. "We are the children of Jóhonaaʼéí, the Sun," the twins called. We come from Dził Náʼoodiłii. We go to our father with a message from Spider Woman." They held out the naayééʼ atsʼos, and sang the song of Spider Woman, and the dunes subsided. "Continue on," the dunes said. "Long life is ahead. Happiness is ahead." To the east the twins saw the turquoise dwelling of the Sun.

==== Encounter with The Sun ====
The twins entered the house of the Sun before Jóhonaaʼéí had completed his journey across the sky. They saw a woman sitting against the western wall, and they saw two handsome young men, Iiʼni Łizhinii, Black Thunder, and Iiʼni Dootłʼizhii, Blue Thunder. No one spoke to them. "We are from Dził Náʼoodiłii," the twins said. "Our mother is Asdzą́ą́ Nádleehé, Changing Woman, and we have been told that Jóhonaaʼéí, the Sun, is our father. We have followed the Holy Trail to seek his help." The woman remained silent. Black Thunder and Blue Thunder approached the twins, and wrapped four blankets around them. They wrapped them in the blanket of red dawn, and the blanket of blue daylight, and the blanket of yellow evening, and the blanket of black darkness. Then Black Thunder and Blue Thunder lifted the bundled twins and lay them high on a shelf.

After a while the twins heard the Sun enter. He removed his glowing hot disk from his back and hung it on the wall. "Who has come here today?" he asked the woman. She did not answer. "From above I saw two strangers come here," said Jóhonaaʼéí. "Where are they?" The woman remained silent. "I know that two strangers are here," said Jóhonaaʼéí, "And I demand to know where they are." "Two young men did come here," said the woman, "and they claim they are your sons. You have promised me that I am the only woman you see. So whose sons are these?" and she went to the bundle and pulled on the blankets. The twins fell to the floor, and at once grasped the hoop of feathers that Spider Woman had given them. Jóhonaaʼéí the Sun said, "I will see if you are my sons," and he seized them at once and hurled them against the sharp spikes of white shell on the eastern wall of his house. The twins, holding the naayééʼ atsʼos, bounced back unharmed. The Sun seized them again and hurled them against the turquoise spikes on his southern wall. Again they held the naayééʼ atsʼos and bounced back unharmed. "You must survive two more tests," said Jóhonaaʼéí. He took them outside where there was a great sweathouse, and he started a fire to heat the four large rocks within it. While he did this, Níłchʼi, the Wind, came up to the twins and whispered "You must dig a tunnel to the outside and hide in it after you have answered his question." The twins dug the tunnel while the Sun prepared the fire, and hid its opening with a stone. The Sun then commanded them to enter the sweatlodge. After a while Jóhonaaʼéí said, "Is it hot in there?" "Yes," answered the twins, and then they hid in the tunnel they had dug. Jóhonaaʼéí suddenly poured a great quantity of water through the hole in the top of the sweatlodge, and when it hit the hot rocks they exploded and hot steam hissed. After a while the twins crawled back into the sweatlodge. Jóhonaaʼéí called, "Is it hot in there?" expecting to get no answer. But the twins answered, "Not so hot as before." The Sun opened the door. "Perhaps you truly are my sons," he said. "Come inside, and we will smoke."

He turned and entered his house. As he did, Níłchʼi, the Wind, came up beside the twins. "The tobacco is poisonous," he whispered. "The spittle of Wóóseekʼidii, the spiny caterpillar will protect you." At once the twins saw a spiny caterpillar on the path, and took some of its spittle into their mouths. Inside, Jóhonaaʼéí, the Sun, brought forth a turquoise pipe from a high shelf on his eastern wall and lit it with the red sun disk. He puffed on it himself, and then passed it to the twins, who each puffed on it themselves. "What sweet tobacco," said the twins. Seeing this, Jóhonaaʼéí the Sun said, "Truly you are my sons. Now tell me why you have come." "Father," they said, "we have come because Naayééʼ, the Alien Monsters, are killing all our people. Yéʼiitsoh the Big Giant devours our people. Déélgééd, the Horned Monster, devours them. Tsé Nináhálééh, the Bird Monster, devours them, and so does Binááʼ yee Aghání, who kills with his eyes. Give us weapons so that we may destroy Yéʼiitsoh and the others."

Jóhonaaʼéí looked in all four directions and saw that the woman was not in the house. Then he said, "I will help you. But Yéʼiitsoh, the Big Giant, is also my son. I will give you weapons so that you may fight the monsters. But I am the one who will strike the first blow when you fight against Yéʼiitsoh the Big Giant. I must do that myself." Then he gave the twins helmets and shirts of hard flint scales, and atsiniltłʼish kʼaaʼ, the chain lightning arrows, and atsoolaghał kʼaaʼ, the sheet lightning arrows, and shá bitłʼóól kʼaaʼ, the deadly sunbeam arrows. And to each he gave béésh doolghasii, the stone knife with the hard blade, and hatsoiiłhał, the stone knife with the broad blade.

When the Sun left on his journey across the top of the sky the next morning, he took the twins with him. At noon they came to Yágháhookááʼ, the hole at the top of the sky. "Now show me where you live," said the Sun. With the help of Níłchʼi, the Wind, the twins, pointed out the four sacred mountains of the four directions, and Dził Náʼoodiłii, the Travelers' Circle Mountain, near the center. "We live near there," they said. "All that you have told me I now know to be true, my sons," said Jóhonaaʼéí. "You will succeed against the Monsters, and in your war against them you will make the final passage from boyhood to manhood." Then he sent down a streak of lightning onto the top of Tsoodził, the Blue Bead Mountain that was the home of Yéʼiitsoh, the Big Giant, and the twins slid down it.

=== The Destruction of the Monsters ===
==== The Slaying of Yéʼiitsoh, the Big Giant ====
It is said that the twin sons of Jóhonaaʼéí descended from the sky to the top of Tsoodził, the Blue Bead Mountain, and came down the mountain on its south slope. They walked on to Tó Sido, which some call Warm Spring. There they found Dinééh Diyiní, the Holy Boy, and Atʼééd Diyiní, Spirit Girl. "Where are you going?" asked Holy Boy. "We have come to find Yéʼiitsoh, the Big Giant," said the twins. "He is huge, and very powerful," said Holy Boy. "Each day he comes late in the day to Tó Sido, to drink from the lake." The next day at dawn the brothers walked to Tó Sido and stood beside the large lake. They took one of the chain lightning arrows their father had given them and shot it at a slab of high rock overhanging the base of Tsoodził. The arrow struck the rock with such force that it shattered and fell where it remains today. "With such weapons as these we cannot fail," they said.

Late in the day they heard Yéʼiitsoh, the Big Giant, approaching. His footsteps shook the canyon walls. Then they saw him come to the water's edge and stoop down to drink. He drank deeply four times, until most of the water was gone from the lake. Then he saw the reflection of the twins in the water, and stood and stared at them. "Yiiniikeetsóóko! Yiiniikeetsóóko!" he shouted. The twins did not understand, but answered, "Yiiniikeetsóóko! Yiiniikeetsóóko!" Then Yéʼiitsoh paced back and forth and said, "What are the two beautiful things that I see, and how shall I kill them?" The twins shouted back, "What beautiful Big Thing is walking about? And how shall we kill it?" Níłchʼi, the Wind came to them and whispered in their ear that since Big Giant was their elder he should be given right of first strike, as they were destroying the child of the Sun. Then suddenly Níłchʼi, the Wind, called "Akóóh! Beware! Jump!" and suddenly the twins found themselves standing on the end of a rainbow, just as Yéʼiitsoh, the Big Giant, hurled his great black knife at them. The rainbow raised up, and the knife passed just below their feet. Níłchʼi, the Wind, whispered "Keep low now!" and Yéʼiitsoh hurled his great blue knife. It passed over them. The Wind said, "Jump to the right!" and the great yellow knife of Yéʼiitsoh passed just to their left. "This is his last weapon," whispered the Wind. "Jump to the left. Now!" The twins leapt to the left, just as the white knife with many points passed to the right of them." The twins were about to use one of their own weapons when a blinding flash of lightning came out of the sky and struck Yéʼiitsoh the Giant on the side of the head. The heavens shook with the thunder, and the Giant shook but stayed on his feet. Then the elder of the two brothers shot a chain-lightning arrow at Yéʼiitsoh. The Giant dropped to his knee, but stood again. The second brother then shot an arrow of sheet lightning which struck the giant in the chest. He fell to both knees and began to fall forward, catching himself with his hands. Then the first brother shot a deadly sunbeam arrow and hit the Giant in the head. Yéʼiitsoh fell face down on the ground. Blood flowed in great streams from the Giant's mouth, and Níłchʼi, the Wind said, "Stop the blood before it reaches the water! It will become alive!" The twins ran to block the flow of blood and it remains on the ground today near the spring at the foot of Tsoodził, the Blue Bead Mountain.

Mask used in Night Chant ceremony, representing the younger twin, known both as Naʼídígishí, He Who Cuts Life Out of the Enemy, and Tóbájíshchíní, Born of Water. Recorded by Matthews in 1902

The twins approached the body of the Giant and saw that he was dead. The younger brother removed the Giant's scalp as proof. Around his body lay many chips of flint from his armor. The twins hurled the flint in each of the four directions, saying, "From now on the people of the earth shall use you." Then the older brother said to the young brother, "I will call you Naʼídígishí, He Who Cuts Life Out of the Enemy." The younger brother then said to his older brother, "And I will call you Naayééʼ Neizghání, Monster Slayer. It is the name by which you shall always be known." Then the two brothers climbed back to the top of Tsoodził, the Blue Bead Mountain where they had landed after descending from the sky, and each sang a song in praise of their father, Jóhonaaʼéí, the Sun, as he neared the end of his journey across the sky. Then they rested for the night.

The next morning the two brothers started for home. Along the trail they met Haashch'ééłti'í, Talking God, and Tó Neinilí, Water Sprinkler. "Well done, nihinálí, our grandsons," they said. You are worthy of all that we taught you. You have served your people well." And the two gods each sang a song to celebrate the victory of the twins over Yéʼiitsoh, the Giant. These two songs are sung today whenever a victory is celebrated. When the brothers came close to the home of Changing Woman, their mother, and First Man and First Woman, they hid their armor and weapons and the scalp of Yéʼiitsoh in the bushes, and then went inside. Changing Woman rejoiced when she saw them. "Where have you been?" she asked. "I thought a monster had devoured you." "We followed Atiin Diyinii, the Holy Trail," said the elder son, Naayééʼ Neizghání. "We came upon Naʼashjéʼii, Spider Woman, and she told us how to go to the house of Jóhonaaʼéí nihitaaʼ, our father the Sun. He gave us weapons, and with them we killed Yéʼiitsoh, the Big Giant." "Do not say this," said First Man. "No one can kill Yéʼiitsoh." Then the brothers led their mother and grandparents outside and showed them the scalp of Yéʼiitsoh, and they rejoiced. Together they sang and danced to celebrate the victory.

==== The Slaying of Déélgééd, the Horned Monster ====
Naayééʼ Neizghání, the elder brother, wished to fight the other monsters, it is said. He asked Changing Woman where the Horned Monster, Déélgééd, lived. Changing Woman said, "He lives at Bikʼi Halzhin, at the foot of the mountains. But you have done enough, my son, and the monsters are hard to kill." "It was also hard for you to give birth to me," said Naayééʼ Neizghání. "Where Déélgééd lives it is dangerous," said Changing Woman. "To all the ends of the earth, there is no such place as Dangerous," answered Naayééʼ Neizghání. The brothers together made two prayer sticks of the medicine plant azeeʼ łahdiltʼéii, each three finger widths long, and lay them in a turquoise dish. Then Naayééʼ Neizghání, Monster Slayer, said to Naʼídígishí, Who Cuts the Life Out of the Enemy, "My brother, I will go alone to fight Déélgééd. You stay here and watch the holy medicine sticks. If a sunbeam should light either one, you will know that I am in danger, and you must help me. Otherwise, stay and protect the others."

At dawn Naayééʼ Neizghání set out to find Déélgééd, the Horned Monster. He came to a broad plain at the foot of the mountains, and saw Déélgééd lying at rest. It had hair like a moose and a great pair of horns. While Naayééʼ Neizghání, Monster Slayer stood watching, Gopher, Naʼazísí came up to him. "I wonder what you are doing here," he said. "There is someone here I seek," said Monster Slayer. "Do you not fear Déélgééd, the Horned Monster who feeds on your kind?" asked Gopher. "Now that you mention it, it is he I seek," said Monster Slayer. "I wish to kill him." "I can help you with that," said Gopher, "but I want a piece of his hide." "You shall have it," said Naayééʼ Neizghání. Then Gopher dug a tunnel right up to Déélgééd. He returned and said, "I have tunneled right up to where he lies. And from that spot I have tunneled to the East, the South, the West, and the North. You can travel beneath him and shoot an arrow straight up into his heart." Naayééʼ Neizghání, Monster Slayer, could not enter the tunnel because it was too small. "Raise your right leg," said Gopher. While Monster Slayer raised his leg, Gopher blew into her tunnel four times, and each time it became larger. Then Naayééʼ Neizghání, Monster Slayer entered the tunnel and crawled to where Déélgééd lay above the opening. He shot a chain-lightning arrow straight up into Déélgééd. The monster roared and tore at the earth with his horns. Monster Slayer hid in the tunnel to the east. Déélgééd tore at the earth around the tunnel. Before he could reach him, Monster Slayer ran into the tunnel to the south. Déélgééd began to tear the earth at that spot with his horns, and Monster Slayer ran into the tunnel to the west. Déélgééd dug into the earth at that spot, but Monster Slayer had run into the tunnel to the north. Déélgééd began to dig to the north, but he was now weak. He fell and lay down. Naayééʼ Neizghání, Monster Slayer crept back up the full length of the tunnel, to where Gopher had started it, and climbed out. There, a little old man dressed in tight leggings and a thin shirt wearing a cap with a feather approached him. This was Hazéítsoh, the Ground Squirrel. "Yáʼátʼééh shínaaí," said Ground Squirrel. "What brings you to this place?" "I am looking at something," said Naayééʼ Neizghání, Monster Slayer. "I wonder what you are looking at," said Ground Squirrel. "I am looking at Déélgééd," said Monster Slayer. "I wonder if I need fear him." "I will go over there and see if he is dead," said Ground Squirrel. "If he no longer breathes I will climb up on his horns and dance and sing. If he is dead, I want some of his blood to decorate my face." "Truly, little brother," answered Monster Slayer, "you shall have it." Ground Squirrel went to Déélgééd, saw that he was dead, and put some of his blood on his face and danced and sang. The face of every ground squirrel bears red streaks to this day. And so it is that there has always been good will between Earth Surface People and the ground squirrels. Gopher came and removed some of Déélgééd's skin and put it on his own back. So it is that the back of gophers is thickly covered to this day, and there has been harmony between Earth Surface People and gophers to this day. And Gopher gave part of the monster's bowel and lung to Monster Slayer to take back as proof that Déélgééd was slain.

Naayééʼ Neizghání, Monster Slayer, returned to his home and showed the lung and bowel of Déélgééd to Changing Woman and First Woman. They danced and chanted in victory. Now two of the monsters were dead. The plan of the Holy People was being fulfilled.

=== Old Age, Cold, Poverty, and Hunger ===
In a few days, Naayéé' Neizghání had killed Tsé Nináhálééh, Monster Eagle, and Tsé dah Hódziiłtáłii, The Monster Who Kicks People Down the Cliff, and Binááʼ yee Aghání, the Monsters That Kill with Their Eyes. "Surely the Naayééʼ have all been destroyed now," said Changing Woman. Níłch'i, The Wind, whispered into the ear of Monster Slayer, "Some still survive. Są́, the Old Age Woman, still remains. She looks like a frail creature, but she slowly saps strength with the passing years. Beware of her." Monster Slayer said to his mother, "Tell me where I can find the dwelling place of Są́, The One Who Brings Old Age." "There is no need for you to seek her," said Changing Woman. Níłchʼi The Wind whispered, "She lives among the mountains at Dibé Nitsaa, the Place of Mountain Sheep."

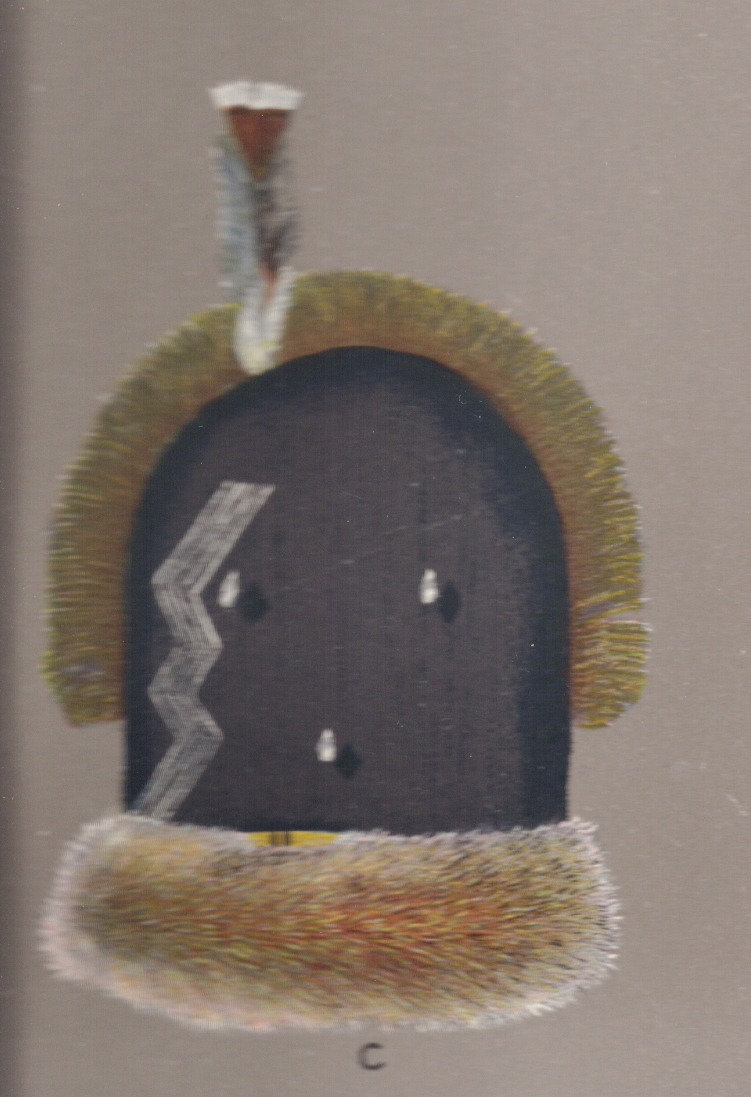
Mask representing Naayééʼ Neizghání, Monster Slayer, used in Night Chant Ceremony, recorded by Matthews in 1902

When he arrived at Dibé Nitsaa, Naayééʼ Neizghání saw an old woman walking slowly toward him, leaning on a staff. Her back was bent. Her hair was white. Her arms and hands were bony. "Old grandmother, I have come to kill you," he said. "I do you no harm, grandson," she replied. "Think it over before you kill me. Once the people discover that Są́ will no longer slowly sap their strength with the passing of years and finally devour them, they will have no children. It is better that people should pass on their wisdom and responsibilities to those who are younger, and finally die." "I will spare you," replied Naayééʼ Neizghání. And he returned without a trophy.

"Hakʼaz Asdzą́ą́, the Cold Woman, still lives," whispered Níłchʼi The Wind to Monster Slayer. "Each year she freezes the earth. She covers the streams with ice. She kills the plants so that the vines bear no melons and the stalks bear no corn." "Mother," demanded Naayééʼ Neizghání, "tell me where I might find the dwelling of Hakʼaz Asdzą́ą́." Changing Woman refused to answer. But Níłchʼi, The Wind, whispered, "She lives high on the summet of Dibé Nitsaa, where the mountain sheep are." Monster Slayer traveled to Dibé Nitsaa and found a lean old woman sitting above the tree line without clothing, on the snow. No roof sheltered her. Her skin was pale as the snow. "Grandmother," said Monster Slayer, "I am here to kill you." "You may kill me," said Cold Woman. "But once I am dead, it will always be hot on the earth. The land will dry up. The springs will cease to flow. Over the years the people will perish." Listening to her words, Naayééʼ Neizghání said, "I will spare you." And he returned without a trophy.

"Téʼéʼį́ Dineʼé, the Poverty Creatures, still live," whispered Níłchʼi into his ear. They destroy people by gradually using up possessions. They will leave no tools for anyone to use, and no clothing to wear." Monster Slayer asked Changing Woman where the Poverty Creatures dwelled, but she refused to tell him. "They live at Dził dah Neeztínii, the Roof Butte Mountain," said Níłchʼi. Naayééʼ Neizghání traveled there, and found a tattered old man and a filthy old woman. Their garments were in shreds, and in their house they had no goods. They had. no food, no baskets, no bowls. "Grandmother, Grandfather," said Monster Slayer, "It gives me no pleasure, but I have come to kill you. Then people will not suffer from want." "Think a moment," they said. "If we were to die, people would not replace anything, or improve on their tools. By causing things to wear out, we lead people to invent new things. Garments become more beautiful. Tools become more useful. People appreciate what they have." Monster Slayer said, "What you say is true. I will spare you." And he returned without a trophy.

"Dichin Hastiin, Hunger Man, still exists," whispered Níłchʼi. "He lives at Tłʼoh adaasgaii, White Spot of Grass." When he arrived there, Naayééʼ Neizghání found twelve ravenous creatures who ate anything that grew. The largest of them was Dichin Hastiin. "I have come here to kill you," said Naayééʼ Neizghání. "Then people will not feel the pangs of hunger and they will not starve for want of food." "I do not blame you for wanting me dead," said Dichin Hastiin. "But if you kill us, people will lose their taste for food. They will never know the pleasure of cooking and eating. But if we live, they will continue to plant seeds and harvest crops, and they will remain skilled hunters." After hearing these words, Monster Slayer returned without a trophy.

When he returned home to his mother Changing Woman, he removed the sheath wherein he carried the stone knife that his father Jóhonaaʼéí hataaʼ the Sun had given him. He realized that now his work was done. He sang:
Now the enemy slayer arrives
From the house of the jagged blades he arrives
From where the sharp knives hang he arrives
And the treasures he has won are yours, oh you gods.

=== Departure of Changing Woman ===
Changing Woman and Naayééʼ Neizghání and the younger twin, Naʼídígishí, who was also known as Tóbájíshchíní, Child of the Water, now heard a voice from the east chanting in reply:
With the Slayer of Monsters I come.
From the house of the dark stone blades I come.
From where the dark stone knives hang I come.
Giver of the sacred hoops I come.
I come, I come! The dreaded one.
Changing Woman said, "It is the voice of your father. Dress yourselves quickly." And then she left the hogan.

Jóhonaaʼéí, the Sun, entered and greeted the twins. To Naayééʼ Neizghání he said, "My son, have you slain all the enemies of the people?" Naayééʼ Neizghání replied, "Those who should die I have killed. I have been among the highest peaks, and I been through the deepest canyons. I have been to the edge of the waters, and I have been to the boundaries of the sky. And wherever I went I found no one who is not a friend to our people." "Then your work is done," said Jóhonaaʼéí. "I will take the weapons I gave you back with me. Tell your mother that after four days I will return. I wish to speak with her on top of Chʼóolʼį́ʼí, the Giant Spruce Mountain." And he departed.

After four days, Asdzą́ą́ Nádleehé, Changing Woman, went to the summit of Chʼóolʼį́ʼí, the Giant Spruce Mountain, and sat on a rock near the spot where she had first felt the warmth of the sun deep within her body. Jóhonaaʼéí, the Sun, came and sat beside her. He tried to embrace her, but she stopped him. "What do you mean by that?" she said. "I want you for my own," he replied. "Come to the west and make a home with me there." "I wish no such thing," she said. "I am lonely," said Jóhonaaʼéí. "What good is all that I do if I must endure my days and nights all alone?" After a time a silence, Asdzą́ą́ Nádleehé spoke. "I am told you have a beautiful house in the east. I want such a house in the west. I want it built floating on the shimmering water, away from the shore, so that the Earth-Surface people will not bother me with their quarrels. I want white shell, and blue shell, and turquoise. I want haliotis. I want soapstone, agate, redstone, and jet. Because I will live there alone while you are gone each day, I want animals to keep me company. Give me buffalo, and deer, and mountain sheep, jackrabbits, prairie dogs, and muskrats. Provide me with those things and I shall go with you to the west."

"What do you mean by making such demands of me?" said Jóhonaaʼéí. "Why should I provide you with all of those things?" "I will tell you why," she said. "You are male and I am female. You are of the sky and I am of the earth. You are constant in your brightness, but I must change with the seasons. Remember that I willingly let you enter me and I gave birth to your sons, enduring pain to bring them into the world. As different as we are, we are of one spirit. As dissimilar as we are, you and I, we are of equal worth. As different as we are, there must be solidarity between us. There can be no harmony in the universe unless there is harmony between us. If there is to be harmony, my request must matter to you. There is to be no more coming from me to you than there is from you to me."

At first Jóhonaaʼéí gave no reply. He carefully weighed all that she had said. Then slowly he placed his arm around her. She allowed him to do so. Then he promised her that all the things she wished for she would have. She would have a house in the west on the shimmering water. She would have gems, and animals. They would dwell together in harmony.

When Changing Woman was ready to depart for her new home, the Mirage People and the Ground Mist People prepared to go with her. She said goodbye to First Man and First Woman and to her two sons. Then she and the Holy People passed through the mountains at Béésh łichííʼí (Red Knife), and in the Chʼíńlį́ Valley they celebrated her betrothal to Jóhonaaʼéí. Her hips widened, and her breasts grew large. The elk and buffalo multiplied, and some left her herd to form other herds and spread across the land. At last she and her party and animals came to the end of the land, and then to her floating house beyond the shore. Then Naayééʼ Neizghání, Monster Slayer, and his brother Tóbájíshchíní, Water Born, traveled to Tó Aheedlí, where the Pine River flows into the San Juan, and there they continue to live below the earth. A petroglyph was made on the canyon wall just above the water level to mark the place.

Then Jóhonaaʼéí, the Sun, said that it was time for the first four Holy People to depart from the surface of the Fourth World. These four, who had come from the First World, were First Man, Áłtsé Hastiin, First Woman, Áłtsé Asdzą́ą́, Mąʼiitoʼí Áłchíní, Great Coyote, and the coyote Áłtsé Hashké, First Angry. They traveled east, beyond the house of the Sun, and took all their powers with them. As they began to travel, First Woman turned and said, "When I wish to do so, I will send back death from disease, and the sign will be the howl of the coyote." Then the four Holy People who had come up from the Third World departed as well. They were Haashchʼéłtiʼí, Talking God, Tó Neinilí, Water Sprinkler, Haashchʼééʼooghaan, House God, and Haashchʼééshzhiní, Black God, the god of fire. As they departed, Haashchʼéłtiʼi said, "If anyone sees us it will be a sign that an enemy is coming into the country. If he hears us call, that same person will be killed by an enemy before the day is over." And so saying they all returned to their homes and all their powers went with them.

Asdzą́ą́ Nádleehé, Changing Woman, began to live in her Floating White Bead House, beyond the shore in the west. In her home on a shelf running east to west on the south side were four water jars. The first was the Black Water Jar which contained the Black Cloud and the Male Rain. The second was the Blue Water Jar which contained the Blue Cloud and the Male Rain. The third was the Yellow Water Jar which contained the Yellow Cloud and the Male Rain. The fourth was the White Water Jar which contained the White Cloud and the Male Rain. On the north side of the home was a shelf running west to east and it were also four jars. The first was a Black Water Jar which contained the Black Vapor and the Female Rain. The second, the Blue Water Jar, contained the Blue Vapor and the Female Rain. The third, the Yellow Water Jar, contained Yellow Vapor and the Female Rain. And last, the White Water Jar, contained the White Vapor and the Female Rain. Other jars contained the seeds of plants and flowers.

As Changing Woman walks in the four directions from her house, she undergoes a change. She comes out of her house an old woman with a white bead walking stick. She walks towards the East and returns middle aged and she carries no walking stick. To the South she walks and she returns a young woman. She walks to the West and comes back a maiden. She goes North and returns a young girl. Often she and Jóhonaaʼéí, the Sun are in harmony. At times they argue and Jóhonaaʼéí does not return to her home at the end of his journey. At those times the sky is stormy and the whole world suffers.

== See also ==
- Fifth World (Native American mythology)

== Notes ==
The Diné (Navajo) informants/consultants on this article: Mescalito; Bilagody, H.; Yazzie, E.; Blackgoat, D.; Vigil, M.; Sandoval, R.; Sandoval, A.; Jimerson, F.; Jimerson, A.; Morgan, W.
