= Spider Grandmother =

Figure in Native American mythology

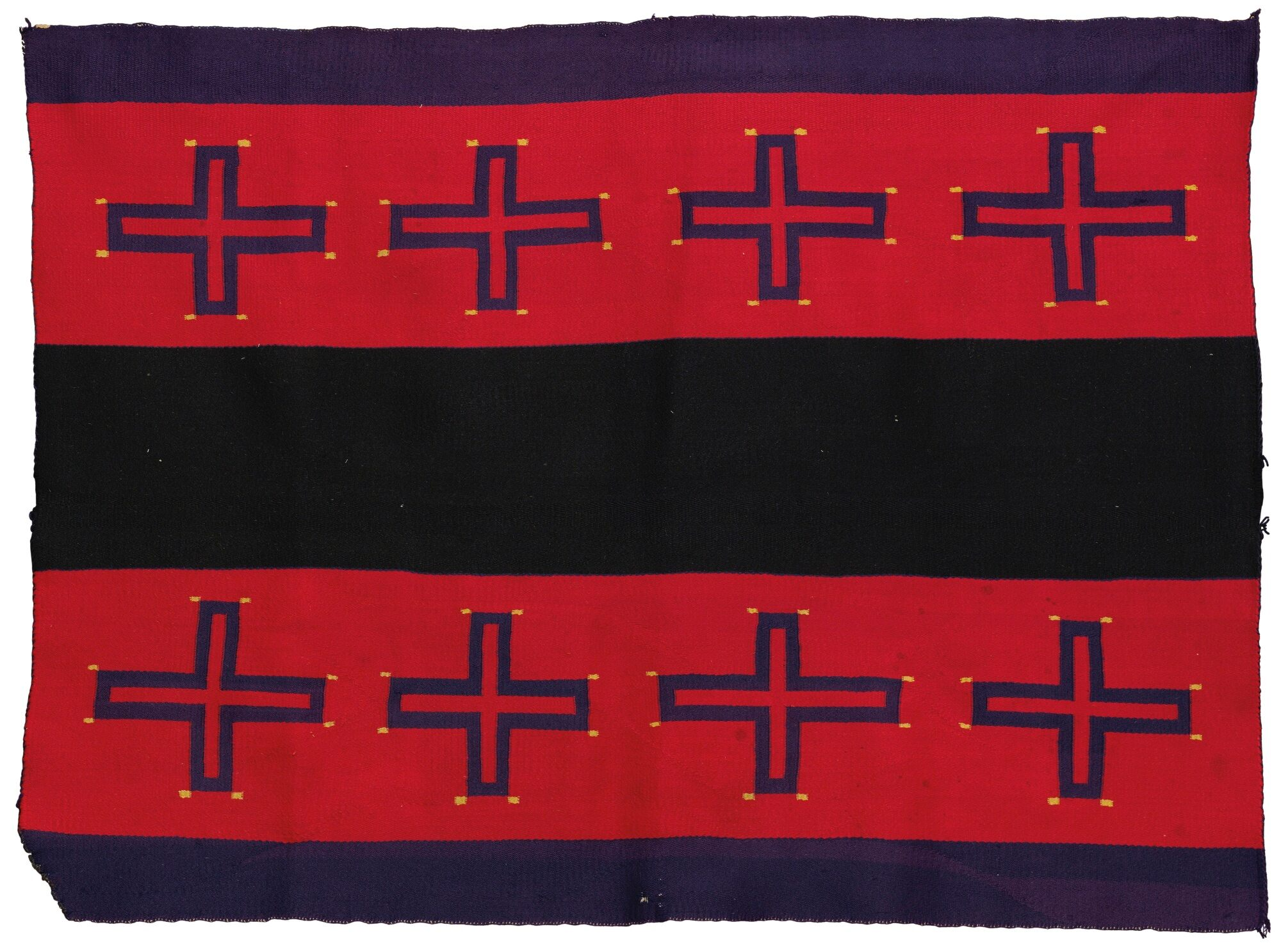
Navajo blanket: the cross is a traditional symbol of Spider Woman.

Spider Grandmother (Hopi Kokyangwuti, Navajo Na'ashjé'ii Asdzáá) is an important figure in the mythology, oral traditions and folklore of many Native American cultures, especially in the Southwestern United States.

== Southwest ==
"Spider Rock", Canyon de Chelly, Arizona; legendary home to the Navajo Spider Grandmother

=== Hopi mythology ===
In Hopi mythology, "Spider Grandmother" (Hopi Kokyangwuti) also called "Gogyeng Sowuhti" among many other names can take the shape of an old or timeless woman, or the shape of a common spider in many Hopi stories. When she is in her spider shape, she lives underground in a hole that is like a kiva. When she is called upon, she will help people in many ways, such as giving advice or providing medicinal cures. "Spider Grandmother" is seen as a leader, a wise individual who represents good things.

==== Creation stories ====
===== First tale =====
This story begins with Tawa (the Sun god) and Spider Woman (Spider Grandmother) who is identified with the Earth Goddess. They separate themselves to create other lesser gods, then create the Earth and its creatures. Spider Woman and Tawa realized the creatures they made were not alive so they gave them souls. After this, they created woman and man from their own likeness and sang them to life. From there, Spider Woman separated creatures into tribes and lead them through the Four Great Caverns. After they came to their final home, Spider Woman tells the people the roles of a woman and a man, as well as the religious practices they were to follow. It is also noted that anthropologist Fred Eggan found this version to be close to the Zuni creation myth.

===== The Four worlds and the Emergence =====
In this narrative, Grandmother Spider is also known as the Good Spirit. She acts as a guide to the creatures in the first world, helping them travel to the higher worlds. She guides and mentors them as they change into different forms, slowly becoming more human. She leaves the creatures in the fourth world (the high world) to settle permanently.

===== The Four Worlds =====
In this story of creation, Spider Grandmother, also called "Gogyeng Sowuhti", is the assistant of Tawa. He sends her to the creatures living in the first world to deliver his word. Tawa is unhappy that his creations do not understand how to live. Spider Grandmother guides the creatures on their journeys through the worlds as their physical appearances change to be more human. In the third world she teaches them how to weave and make clay pots. While in the third world the people begin to turn away and forget Tawa. Because of this Spider Grandmother is sent to let the few who are still good know that it is time to leave the others behind. With the help of the Pokanyhoya and the Chipmunk, Spider Grandmother advises and leads the people to the upper world where they will reside. Spider Grandmother helps the people create the Sun and Moon, advises the people on how and where to travel, and on religious practices.

==== Other myths ====
In The Destruction of Awatovi (A Walpi Reed Clan Version), Spider Grandmother uses her special glass to find a missing woman for Coyote and his grandmother. Coyote and his grandmother are searching for this missing woman while her husband is taking care of their children at home.

In The Village at Lamehva (How the Reed Clan Came to Walpi), Spider Grandmother guides her two grandsons who are both named Pakanghoya to create people out of mud. The brothers assume she brought the mud people to life. Later in the story, she acts as a guide to one of the mud people village members named Sikyakokuh. Spider Grandmother advises Sikyakokuh on his journey to find a hunting dog for the village. She tells him how to appease the village of dogs in order to give him one of their members.

In Destruction by Fire (How the Village of Pivanhonkapi Perished), Spider Grandmother saves the Oraibi village from being burned down by the neighboring witches. Spider Grandmother spun a magical web over the village and having the people douse it with water.

In The Races at Tsikuvi (Why the Payupki People Departed), Spider Grandmother helps the people in the Payupki village win races against the Tsikuvi village (whose members had been rude to her). She helped them by putting a special medicine on their best runners legs. Later in the story, she changes into her spider form and crawls into the ear of the second runner to give her advice on how to avoid the traps set by the Tsikuvi village. At the end of the story, Spider Grandmother helped the Payupki village escape an attack from the rival village Tsikuvi by advising the Payupki village leader to move the village and its people.

In The Story of Tiyo, Spider Grandmother is called "Spider Woman" and she helps Tiyo on his journey to the Far-Far-Below river to see where it travels. Tiyo travels to the home of "Spider Woman" and enters her home magically through a small hole. She gives him a special serum called nahu to spit on his enemies to subdue them. After spending a few days in her home, Tiyo starts his journey to the Far-Far-Beyond river accompanied by "Spider Woman". She advises him on the tests and challenges of his journey and threatens to leave him if he does not follow her direction. Tiyo completes this journey with Spider woman's help, and from this he gains wisdom and knowledge.

=== Navajo Mythology ===
In Navajo mythology, Spider Woman (Na'ashjé'íí Asdzáá) is the constant helper and protector of humans. Spider Woman is also said to cast her web like a net to capture and eat misbehaving children. She spent time on a rock aptly named spider rock which is said to have been turned white from the bones resting in the sun.

The Diné Bahaneʼ creation narrative of the Navajo (recorded 1928) includes a mention of "Spider Woman and Spider Man", who introduced the spindle and the loom. In another myth, "Spider Woman" aided the twins (born of the Sun and the Changing Woman) in killing the monsters that were endangering "The Earth surface People" by giving them "feather hoops" that protected them from attacks. In another myth, two women come to "Spider Woman" hoping for a solution to help the Navajo people bear the winter. She taught the women how to make yarn from sheep wool, and to dye it and weave it. From this, the women taught the other villagers how to do these things, and the village was able to make rugs to use and sell to help survive the winter.

=== Other Southwest myths ===
In The Zuni Emergence Myth, Water Spider appears and uses his body and long legs to find the center of the Earth so that the Zuni people could live there in order for their views to not be swayed in one way. Also, according to the Zuni, string games were given to them by Grandmother Spider.

In Pueblo tradition, Spider Old Woman appears as the equivalent of "Thought Woman" (Keresan Tse-che-nako, Sussistanako): while the name of "Thought Woman" was reserved for sacred ceremonies, Spider Woman would be used in the context of everyday discussion or teaching.

Karl Taube in 1983 tentatively connected the South Western "Spider Woman" mytheme with the pre-Columbian Teotihuacan "Great Goddess" known from pictorial representations.

== Other regions ==
The Ojibwe people (Chippewa) of southern Canada and northern US speak of Spider Woman, known as Asibikaashi, as a helper of the people, and inspiring mothers (or other close female relatives) to weave protective spider web charms.

In Lakota tradition, the (male) trickster spirit Iktomi appears in the form of a spider.

In the Northwest, the Coos people of Oregon have their version of a Spider Grandmother traditional tale.

The Choctaw people of Tennessee and Mississippi tell the story of Grandmother Spider stealing fire, then after animals refused it, bringing fire to humans.

Susan Hazen-Hammond (1997, 1999) compiled numerous tales collected from various tribes.

In the Pacific there is a connection between Spider Grandmother and the Moon Goddess.

== In popular culture ==
Murray Mednick wrote seven one-act plays called The Coyote Cycle with the same four characters: Coyote, Coyote trickster, Spider Grandmother and Mute Girl. These same characters come from traditional Native American stories and myths.

Spiderwoman Theater, a Native American feminist theater group, named themselves after the Spider Woman narrative.

Alice Walker's feminist novel Meridian (1976) references the Spider Woman narrative.

Gorg Huff and Paula Goodlett's fantasy novel Warspell: The Merge (December 2018) references the Spider Woman narrative. In the novel, characters from a popular role playing game merge with the normal humans who play them in the game realm, and the mythological creatures from the game, including Spiderwoman, come to Earth with them.

== Spider Grandmother in other works ==
The Book The Heroine's Journey: Woman's Quest for Wholeness compares Grandmother Spider, Hecate, and Hestia as strong female characters. This source also states that women can look to emulate the qualities of these characters.

The Article Grandmother Spider: Connecting All Things (Preventing Chronic Disease) connects medical programs with Spider Woman (Grandmother Spider). In this work it states the importance of having medical networks connected like a spider web. It compares Spider Woman's interconnections to the Native American people to the need for interconnections in public health to produce better services.

== See also ==
- Cultural depictions of spiders
- Diné Bahaneʼ
