= Tó Neinilii =

The Navajo rain god and trickster, often depicted as a clown in ceremonies

Tó Neinilii (also known as Tonenili) is the rain god of the Navajo people of Arizona and New Mexico. In tribal stories, he is a trickster figure. In the tribal dances he is represented by a masked man who enacts the part of a clown. He is shown carrying a water pot. In myths, he is the fool who dances about in order to show that he is pleased with what is happening. Tó Neinilii was said to often argue with the Navajo god of gambling, Nohoilpe. In times of drought or misfortune due to the weather, it was often said that Tó Neinilii had lost a bet with Nohoilpe. In tradition, Toneinili saved the first Navajo people from the sea monster Tééhoołtsódii. Some Navajo believe that Tonenili is also in control of snow, sleet, and hail. In modern times it is said that Tonenili is in charge of thunder and lightning, but this does not have traditional evidence.
