= Anaye =

Race of monsters in Navajo mythology

The Anaye (or Nayéé’, Navajo pronunciation: [nɑ̀jéːʔ]) were a race of monsters or evil gods from Navajo mythology, who were all killed by the hero Nayenezgani.

== Creation ==
According to the legend, Anaye came about when men and women separated after a dispute, resulting in the women having sexual intercourse with random objects that they found. This resulted in them giving birth to monsters resembling what their "father" was. For example, Yeitso's was birthed from a stone.

== List of Anaye ==
=== Binaye Ahani ===
"Eye Killers" were a group of limbless creatures that could either shoot lightning from their eyes or could kill things by looking at them. Nayenezgani got around this by throwing salt in their eyes and shooting arrows at them. Their remains became cacti.

=== Sasnalkáhi ===
"The Bear That Pursues" was a giant bear that would hide in its cave, killing anyone that came near. Nayenezgani waited for its head to stick out and chopped it off. He cut the head into three pieces, which each became yucca.

=== Teelget ===
"Horned Monster" (sometimes the Delgeth) was a large creature that mauled people to death with its thick antlers. Nayenezgani could not approach it directly nor sneak up on it in the grassy field it lived in, so he crawled underneath a gopher tunnel and waited for the beast to come over top of him. Once it did, he stabbed at it from underneath.

=== Tsé’nagahi ===
"Traveling Stone" was a monstrous rock that would roll and crush passersby to death. Nayenezgani killed the creature by placing his knives point up in the ground and letting it stab itself to death while chasing after him. Its body became Shining Rock.

=== Tsenahale ===
"Rock-Monster Eagles" were a pair of enormous birds of prey that feed humans to their hatchlings. Nayenezgani tricked them into taking him to their nest and held the babies hostage. After he killed the parents, Nayenezgani promised not to kill the offspring as long as they also promised not to kill any more humans. They became first the bald eagle and owl. (In some versions the Tsenahale are Thunderbirds)

=== Tsetahotsiltali ===
"Cliff Dweller" would use its massive legs to kick travellers down cliffs. It tried this on Nayenezgani, who survived by clinging onto the side of the cliff but losing all of his weapons. He grabbed the monster by its hair and pulled it down the mountain instead, its children finishing it off. They became the buzzards.

=== Yeitso ===
Generally considered the most powerful Anaye, "Big Monster" was the last killed by Nayenezgani. Yeitso was a giant so large, it could walk as far as a man could travel from sunrise to sunset in a single step and drink an entire lake in four gulps.

Yeitso first encountered Nayenezgani when he stumbled upon Changing Woman, who hid her sons and tried to convince Yeitso that it was mistaken. When questioned about the small footprints in the snow, Changing Woman replied saying that in her loneliness she made the footprints herself to pretend she has company.

When the twins were fully grown, they tracked Yeitso down with very little difficulty. He spotted them in the bushes but they quickly disappeared. They taunted him four times before shooting a lightning bolt, killing it instantly. Nayenezgani scalps Yeitso and throws it into the lake, creating Cabezon Peak.
