= Asdzą́ą́ Nádleehé =

Navajo creation spirit

- Creation spirit
- Other names: Changing Woman, Ahsonnutli, Estsanatlehi, Etsanatlehi, Whiteshell Woman, Turquoise Woman, Abalone Woman, Jet Woman, White Painted Woman, Iatiku, Moon Woman
- Ethnic group: Navajo

Genealogy
- Parents: Long Life Boy, Happiness Girl
- Children: Monster Slayer, Born For Water

Asdzą́ą́ Nádleehé (Navajo pronunciation: [àstsɑ̃́ː nátˡèːhé]) (also spelled Ahsonnutli, Estsanatlehi, and Etsanatlehi in older sources), meaning "the woman who changes", is one of the creation spirits of the Navajo. According to the Navajos, she created the Navajo people by taking old skin from her body and using her mountain soil bundle (a bag made of four pieces of buckskin, brought by her father from the underworld) to create four couples, who are the ancestors of the four original Navajo clans. She helped create the sky and the earth. She is the mother of twins Monster Slayer and Born for Water (fathered by the sun).

In English sources she is usually named Changing Woman. Her parents were Long Life Boy and Happiness Girl, who "represent the means by which all life passes through time." She is associated with a young Navajo woman's entry into puberty, and the kinaalda, a four-day rite at that time. Changing Woman is celebrated in the Blessing Way, a Navajo prayer ceremony that brings fortune and long life.

In the American Southwest, she is also known as Whiteshell Woman (who, in some accounts, is her sister), Turquoise Woman, Abalone Woman, and Jet Woman. Other names include White Painted Woman (from the Apache), Iatiku (from the Keresans), and Moon Woman (from the Pawnee).

== See also ==
- Diné Bahaneʼ
