= Navajo wedding ceremony =

Navajo wedding ceremonies and traditions

Navajo wedding ceremony Navajo
- Status: Active
- Genre: Ceremony
- Frequency: Regular
- Venue: Hogan

The Navajo wedding ceremony is unique to the Navajo people (also known as the Diné), an indigenous people in the Southwestern United States. The ceremony includes many rituals meant to incorporate harmony, balance, and nature. It also demonstrates the Navajo people's deep connection with nature and their land, with the use of various important resources to them such as corn, hand woven textiles and baskets, local minerals, and horses. In addition to the union of two people, the ceremony has symbolic significance related to the spiritual joining of families, clans, and the earth's elements, further insisting on their powerful link to the earth and its consequential role in their ceremonies in general.

== Purpose ==
The Navajo wedding ceremony is rooted in the Blessingway tradition, placing an emphasis on Hózhó, a phenomenon that combines harmony, balance, and beauty. This indigenous wedding ritual focuses on the commitment and union of families, rather than the material and decorative aspect found in most weddings in the western world. The community role in the ceremony is an important aspect, as the wedding unites families as well as clans.

For the Navajo, marriage traditionally holds significant economic and social importance. Households depend on the cooperation of both partners for survival and long-term stability. Unions are often arranged between families that are considered economically compatible. Men are generally expected to contribute substantial labour and resources, reflecting their role in sustaining the household. Marriages are frequently pre-arranged to strengthen connections and ensure that both families involved can maintain mutual support over time.

== Main Customs ==
=== Setting and preparation ===
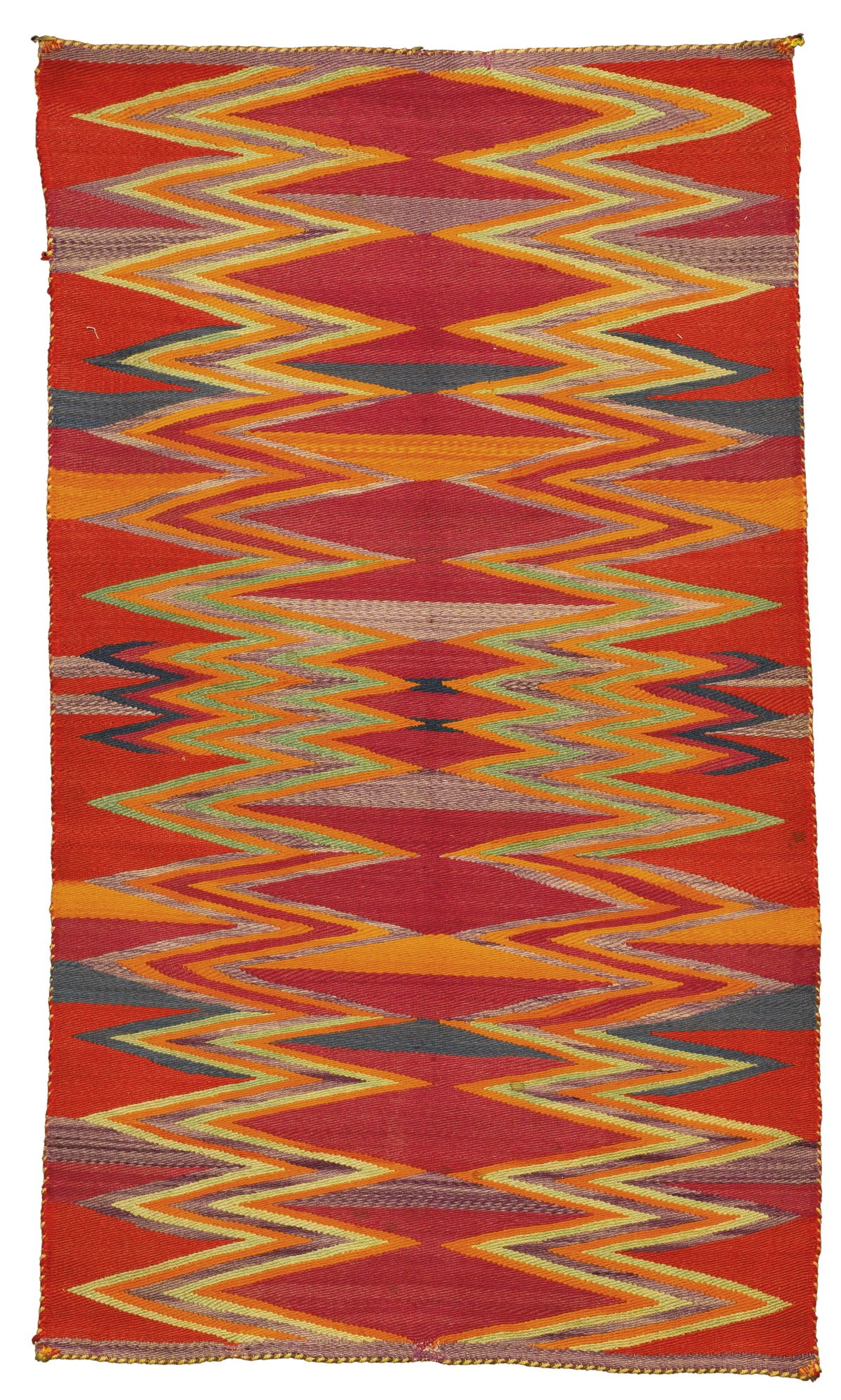
Typical blanket used during the Navajo wedding ceremony rituals.

Following custom, the wedding takes place as the sun sets, and the core rituals happen in a Hogan, usually built specifically for the ceremony. The bride covers her head with a blanket while arriving at the Hogan as to not be touched by sunlight, to avoid the sun god’s jealousy. The groom traditionally approaches on horseback, accompanied by his family, before the sun has fully set. The saddle is then removed and placed in the bride’s home.

Traditionally, the bride faces east while sitting on the south side of the Hogan, while the groom sits on the left on the north side to her left. A wedding officiant or medicine man generally sits in front of the bride to conduct the ceremony. Before the ceremony begins, the bride's hair may be covered with a blanket or scarf.

=== Main rituals ===
During the ritual, the bride and groom exchange small symbolic gifts representing their love and life together. For example, corn, representing fertility, feathers, to represent loyalty, and stones for strength. As the couple takes their walk, the guests join hands to form a circle around them and the sacred fire, signifying unity and support.

One of the rituals in the ceremony is the symbolic action of the bride and groom washing each other’s hands. This involves the use of a decorated pot and a carved dipper made out of a gourd. This ritual represents a new beginning and purity by washing away negative experiences of the past and starting a new joint life.

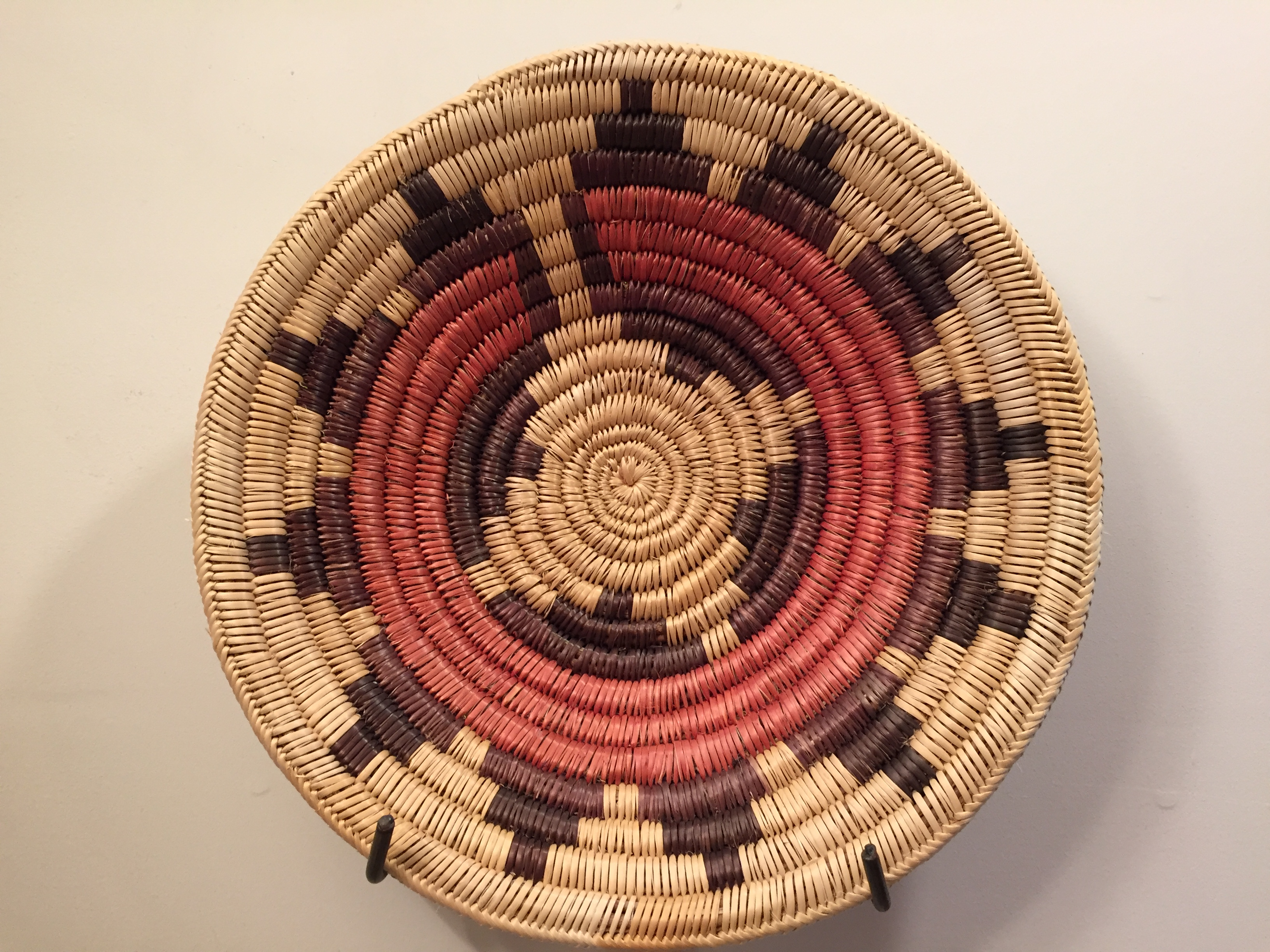
Traditional Navajo wedding basket.

The ceremony often includes the use of a hand-woven wedding basket, called a Ts'aa' Baa Hane', which symbolizes balance and the cyclical nature of life. The centre represents emergence, or birth, while the line coming out from the centre would be the road used to emerge. The colours and patterns surrounding the centre would be the mountains, clouds, and setting sun, each bringing a form of blessing and luck.

Food has a symbolic role in the ritual, related to fertility. It is based on the Navajo creation legends of the first man and woman being carved from corn cobs by the Talking God. The couple eat a mixture of different coloured corn, with yellow corn representing female and white corn male. Corn pollen is then sprinkled on top to ensure a fertile marriage.

=== Post ceremony and marriage ===
After the wedding ceremony, it is customary for the bride and groom to ask family members, friends, and elders for advice to make their marriage happy and long-lasting. After the marriage ceremony, the husband often moves into his wife’s household, reinforcing the woman’s social status and the matrilineal structure.

Among the Navajo, marriage customs differ in several ways. Traditionally, the union is monogamous and emphasizes hózhó between the couple and their extended families. Historically, cases of polygamy existed among the Navajo, but they were not the norm and were far less common than monogamous unions; polygamous unions are no longer legally practiced today. The groom is traditionally expected to avoid direct contact with his mother-in-law, following the Navajo custom of respectful distance between them. Therefore, a separate house is made available for the newly weds.

Kinship rules are strictly observed in the marriage. The Navajo follow a matrilineal kinship system, in which descent and inheritance are traced through the mother’s line. Marriage within one’s own maternal or paternal clan is strictly forbidden as it is considered incestuous. Divorce is socially acceptable and can be initiated by either spouse if harmony is lost. A pregnant woman would be discouraged from marrying out of fear that she may suffer from a complication later on.

== Wedding Garments ==
The wedding garments are an important element in the ceremony, with each piece being chosen for both its aesthetic and spiritual meaning. Together, the garments of the bride and groom are meant to express balance between tradition and spirituality, as well as honouring both the natural world and their ancestors.

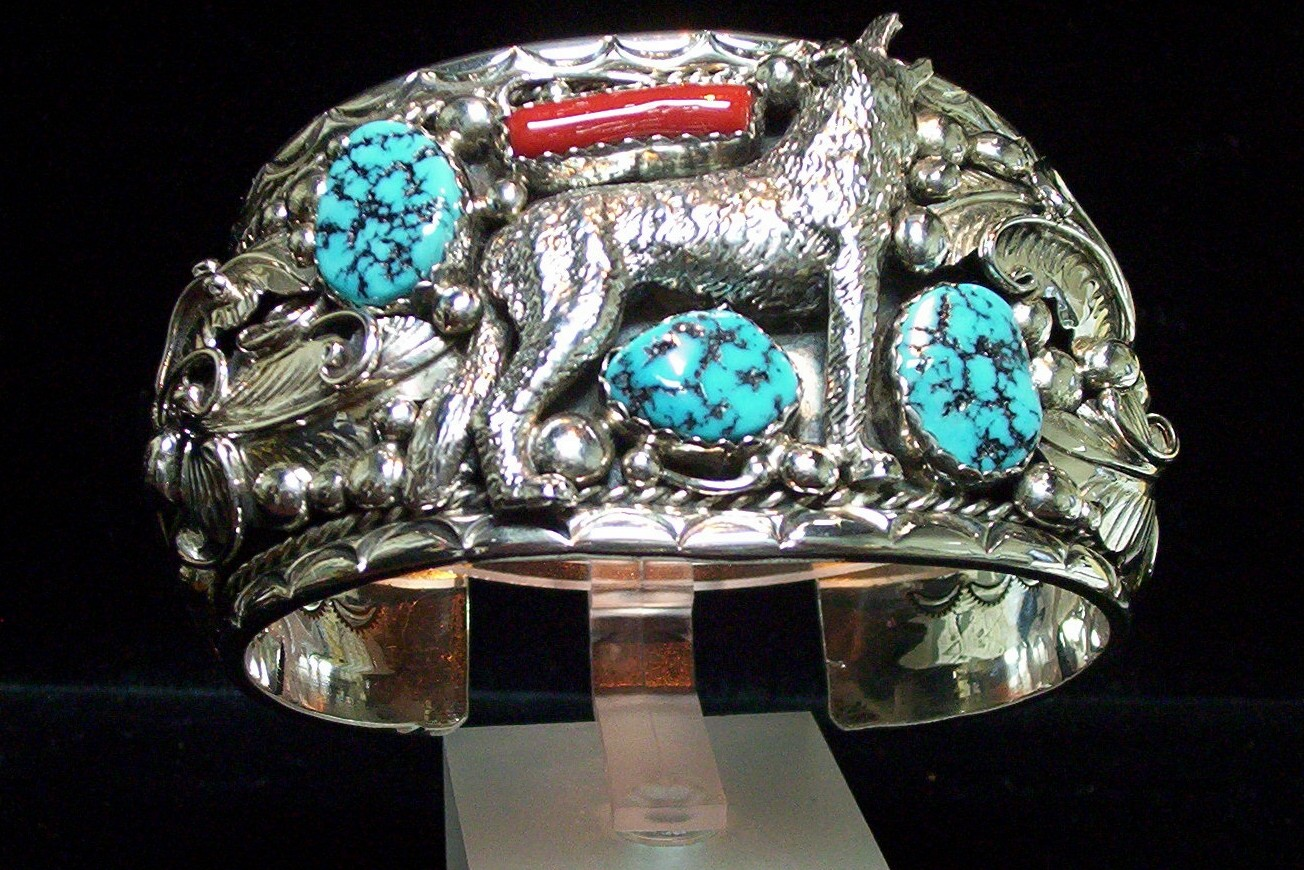
Navajo turquoise jewelry commonly worn during wedding rituals.

Both bride and groom use traditional Pendleton blankets and headbands. The blankets, woven with Navajo patterns, represent warmth, protection, and the unity of two families. These are sometimes gifted by elders as a blessing for prosperity and harmony in married life. The colours worn in the ceremony tend to be vibrant, with the use of colours such as cyan, red, orange, and white, contrasting with shades of grey and brown. The bride typically wears a velvet or satin blouse and a long handwoven skirt made of wool or cotton. The skirt is often pleated and dyed in vibrant colours such as red, cyan, or white, representing life, purity, and the Four sacred mountains. Around her waist, she wears a silver concho belt or a woven sash.

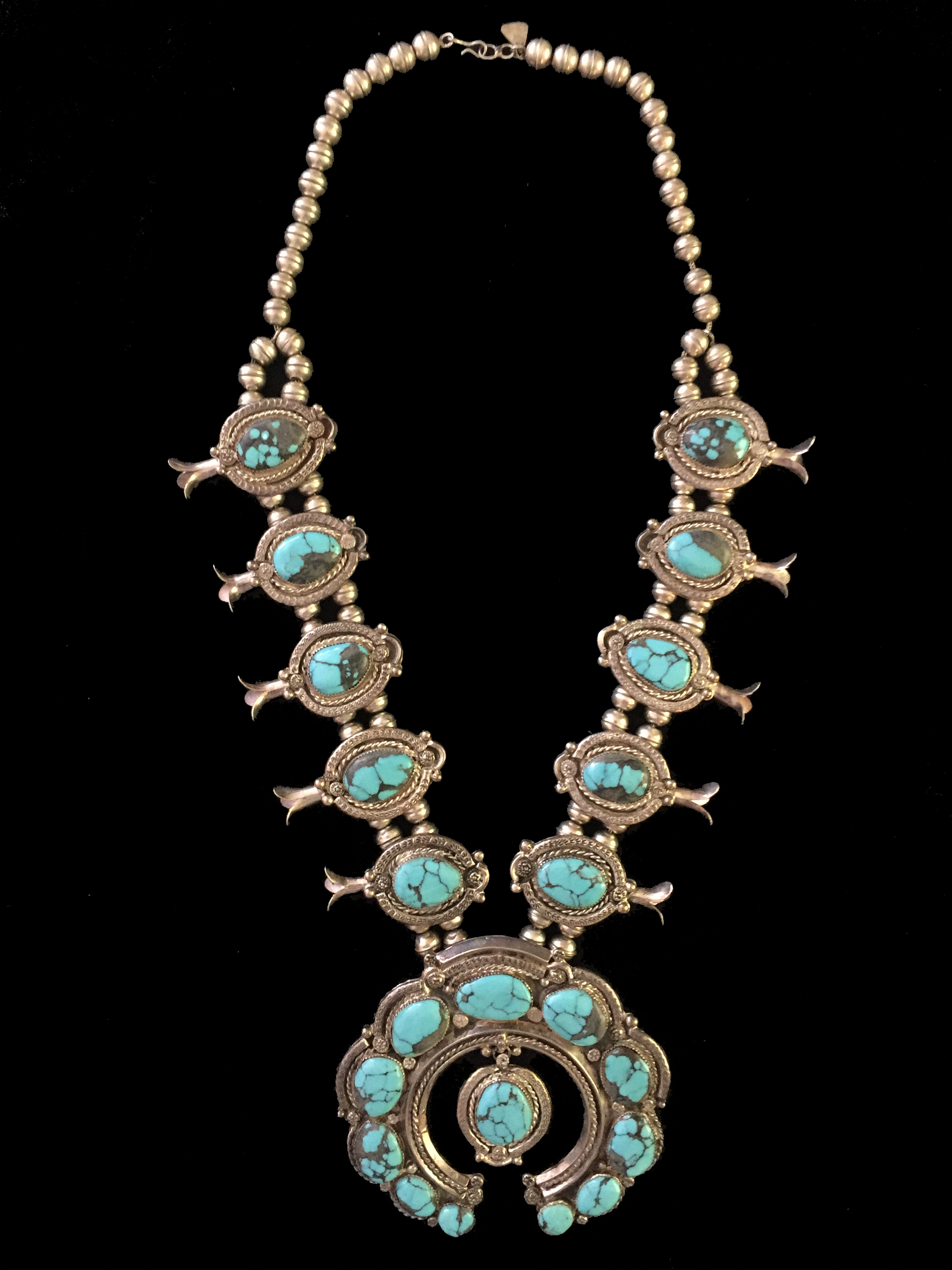
Navajo Squash Blossom Necklace (názhah).

Her jewelry is an essential part of wedding attire. It includes turquoise stones set in silver necklaces, bracelets, rings, and earrings, which are considered to provide protection and represent blessings, the sky, and water vital sources of life and renewal. She may also wear a squash blossom necklace (názhah), which is a traditional Navajo symbol of fertility and prosperity. The bride’s hair is tied in a traditional Navajo bun (tsiiyéél), a style associated with cultural pride and balance.

The groom usually wears a white or light-coloured handmade cotton shirt, dark trousers, and moccasins crafted from soft leather. His attire is meant to symbolize purity, humility, and connection to earth. Like the bride, he also adorns himself with turquoise jewellery, often necklaces or bracelets gifted by relatives as a blessing for protection and good fortune. He may tie a woven headband around his forehead, often in red or cyan hues symbolising strength and focus.

== See also ==
- Navajo nation
- Wedding dress
- Wedding customs by country
