= Life cycle ritual =

Ceremony to mark a change in a person's status

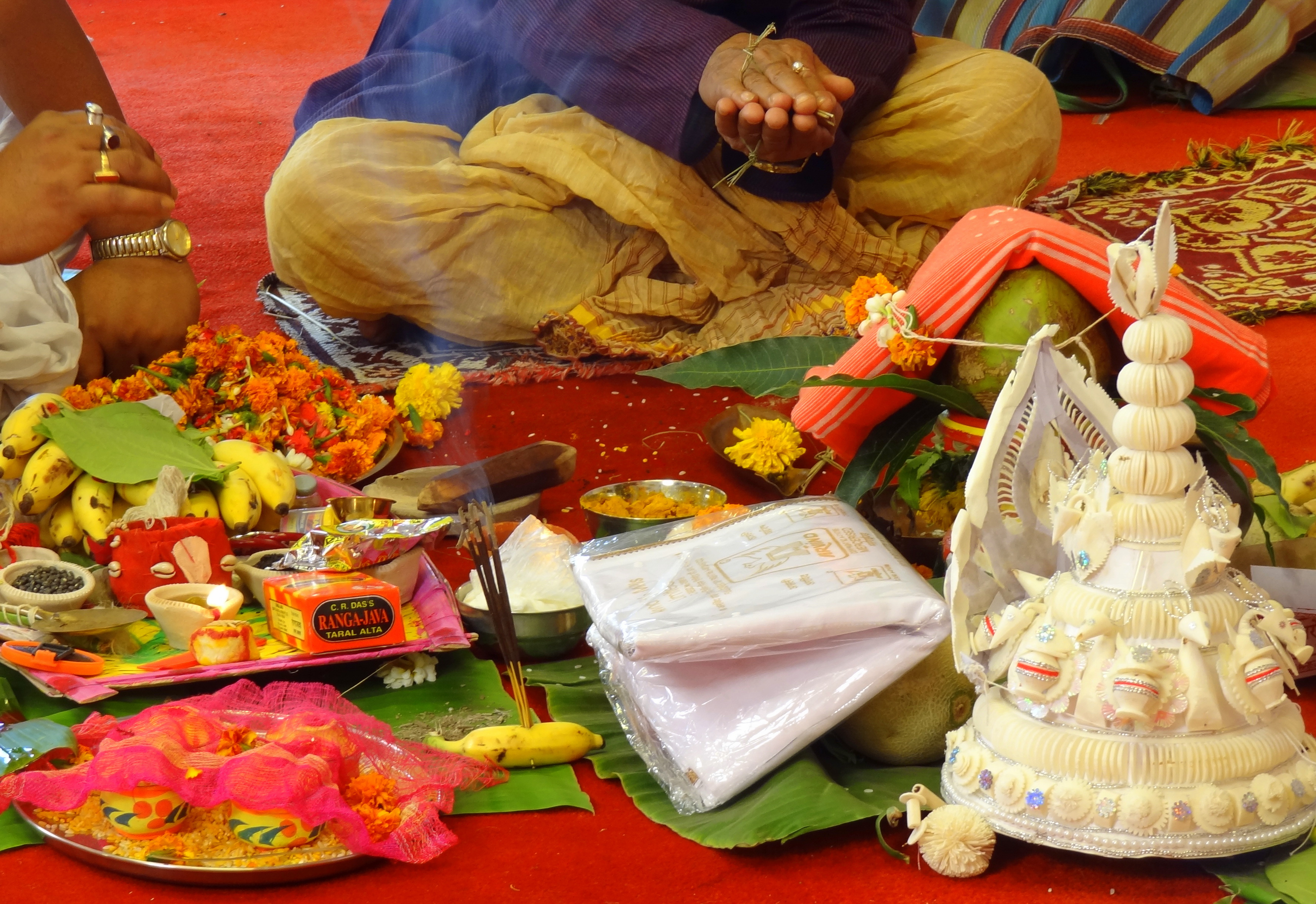
- Ritual
- Birth
- Naming Ceremony: Buddhism * Christianity * Hinduism * Judaism *Humanism * Islam * Wicca * Druidism
- Adolescence
- Coming of age (Cultural): Australia * NZ * UK * Ireland * Poland * Ukraine * Scandinavia * Humanist * Latin America * United States * Canada * Spain * Japan * Papua * New Guinea *Vietnam * Indonesia * Pygmies * Korea *Communitas * Philippines * Khmer
- Marriage
- Religious Aspects Of Weddings: Christian views on marriage * Hindu wedding * Jewish wedding * Marriage in Islam * Chinese wedding
- Death
- Religious Funerals: Buddhist funeral * Christian burial * Islamic funeral * Bereavement in Judaism * Sikh * Antyesti

A life cycle ritual is a ceremony to mark a change in a person's biological or social status at various phases throughout life. Such practices are found in many societies and are often based on traditions of a community. Life cycle rituals may also have religious significance that is stemmed from different ideals and beliefs.

A life cycle ritual can best be described as a ceremony undergone by an individual when he or she enters one phase of life to another. The term may be synonymous with rite of passage as described by Arnold van Gennep in his 1909 work The Rites of Passage, although it can be described as more specifically to do with major biological life events such as birth, adolescence, marriage and death. Van Gennep described society as being composed of "…several disparate social groupings". He further divided these social groupings into either secular (financial strata, for example) or sacred (being born, getting married), the latter being the category most closely associated with life cycle rituals.

Van Gennep classified rituals as broadly belonging to one of three categories: separation, liminal and incorporation. The separation phase involves the individual leaving one group or life phase at a point in time and the incorporation phase involves them joining the new phase. The liminal phase is the transitive phase in between the two where the individual has left one phase but not yet joined the next.

The various phases of the life cycle were described by anthropologist David Lancy as belonging to six practical categories:

1. Birth and early infancy, which Lancy describes as ritually being the least important given the doubt over the child's survival;
2. Joining the community when the infant's survival is confirmed, usually denoted by a naming ceremony;
3. Separation, marked by removing the child from the mother's breast or when the child starts walking;
4. Getting noticed i.e. when the child starts becoming useful, usually by beginning to help around the house;
5. Adolescence, described as being highly variable across cultures and most commonly being marked by an initiation ceremony; and
6. Adulthood, which the author says in most cultures is the point when the individual sires offspring.

Birth rites begin at the indication of pregnancy and through childbirth, continuing for a variable time forth until the required conditions per individual practices are satisfied. Adolescence is also marked by the term coming of age, which is the transition period between childhood and adulthood. In some societies, it is described by Suad Joseph as the change associated with the age of sexual maturity (p. 68), while in others, it is marked as the age where one adopts religious and social responsibility and standing. Initiation rights specifically involve those relating to the age during which sexual maturity is observed. However, this is very variable between societies and religions, and so the definition of maturation is derived mostly from social and cultural beliefs.

Norbeck and Alexander note that in primitive societies detached from the modern developing world, the rites of passage are limited by distinctions of sex and age. There is an absence of social status and developed religious beliefs. In culturally sophisticated societies, there are distinct divisions of labor, social statuses of the leadership and specialised occupations. Individuals are literate and learned, and possess the intellectual thinking to develop personal beliefs based on knowledge and understanding. This results in more organised practices of life cycle rituals, mostly in tune with critical biological and social events.

Life cycle ceremonies possess aspects of the symbolism that are representative of their origin. The practice of each rite and ritual has certain rules and conditions that must be adhered to. These can vary from clothing, venue, time of day, recitation of prayers and order of proceedings.

== Examples of life cycle rituals ==
=== Birth ===
- In India, the birth of a male is announced by the beating of a thali (a sort of bronze utensil) by friends or relatives while a female child is announced by the beating of a fan used for winnowing.
- In most Muslim cultures, it is customary for the father or general patriarch of the family to whisper the adhan, the Muslim call to prayer, into the child's ear as soon as possible after birth.

=== Adolescence ===
- In the Navajo tribe, the Kinaaldá ceremony marks the advent of womanhood for a girl when she experiences her first menstrual cycle. The ceremony lasts several days and is composed of several discrete rituals.
- The bar mitzvah is a coming of age ceremony for Jewish boys at the age of 13, where they read scripture from the Torah in the synagogue and a celebration is held in the boy's honor afterwards.

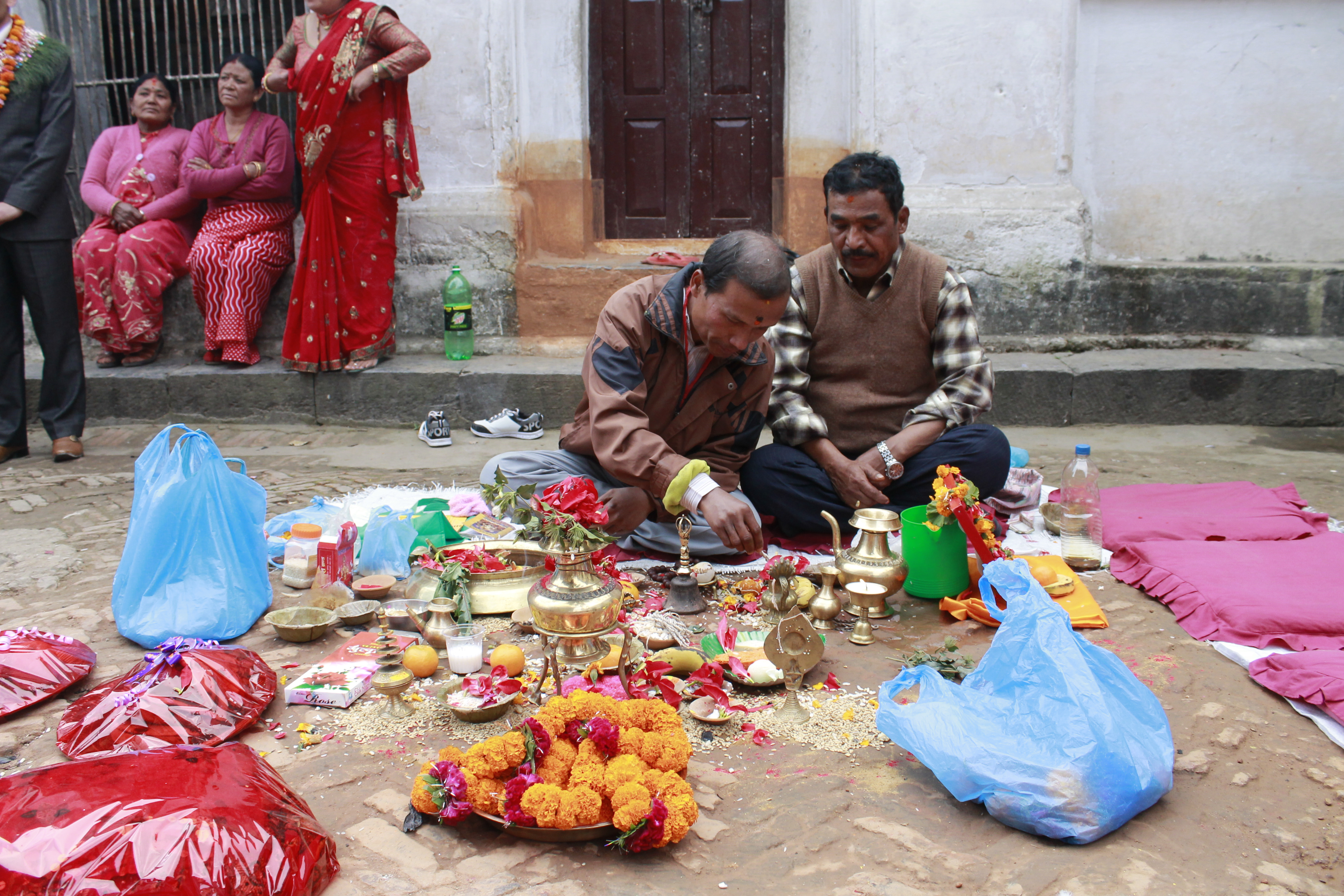
Marriage ceremony in Lalitpur, Nepal

=== Marriage ===
- Marriage in Renaissance Florence was usually marked by the delivery of an intricately decorated chest with the wedding procession. This chest contained the bride's dowry and would later be added to the furniture in the newlyweds' bedroom.
- In the Garo community of Bangladesh, an essential pre-wedding ceremony involves the compulsory gifting of betel leaf, nuts and sweets to the groom from the bride's family.

=== Death ===
- In the Akan culture of Ghana, the widow of a recently deceased man wears a charm necklace for the entire 40-day period of the funeral rites, so that her husband may not return to haunt her from the afterlife as believed.
- In Japanese Buddhist culture, after the cremation of the deceased, family and close friends use special chopsticks to pick up bone fragments and place them in an urn, which in turn must be placed in a family grave within 49 days of the funeral.

== Classification ==
While no scheme of classification of passage rites has been universally accepted, there is a general trend with names being given to distinguishable types and some corresponding examples:

- Purification practices – prepare the individual for communication with the supernatural, or erasing an old status in preparation for a new one.
- Social transformation – initiation, induction, change in status.
- Religious transformation – sacrifice rituals, acceptance of a belief, functions related to changing life stages, circumcision.
- Biological development – pregnancy, childbirth, birth, puberty, menopause.
- Marital ceremonies.
- Death – burial, cremation, prayers (include all stages of separation, transition and reincorporation).

== Psychological impact ==
Possessing religious and cultural significance, rituals and ceremonies are noted to provide one with a sense of belonging and a deeper meaning and the understanding of their being. This applies to one's position as an individual, a follower of a certain belief and a member of society. It also fosters personal and family identity, providing a means by which one can possess a feeling of belonging. Life cycle rites also help individuals in becoming more aware, understanding and accepting of the inevitable changes in life, reducing a feeling of the possible isolation or unfamiliarity. They channel feelings of togetherness and inclusion for the closed ones of the involved individual as well.

Transitional rituals and rites of passage have profound implications on the development of the individual psyche. The decline of such initiation rites among males in today's technology and intellect driven world has been associated with a loss of identification with the male group as a whole and a lack of perceived masculinity among modern men, leading to feelings of anxiety, inadequacy and overall impotence and anger management issues.

Conversely, extremely severe initiation rituals have been found to induce a sense of cognitive dissonance within the psyche of the initiate. Individuals who undergo severe rites before joining a specific group tend to find that group more attractive due to a perceived pride and justification of effort. This fosters an inbuilt belief of superiority, as well as dissociation from personal ideals, which transform into those adopted by the group as a whole.

Rituals and ceremonies also effectively reinforce the changes corresponding to the developmental stages that they signify. A baby's identity for its family and community after birth, reminding an individual of their newly adopted responsibilities and expectations upon reaching adolescence, officiating a couple's love by transforming them from lovers to committed partners in a marriage, and the preparation of a person's body as per cultural or religious standards after their death are all examples of such reflection.

Overall, the performance of rituals as part of an overall cultural identity has been found to be associated with an increased feeling of association with other members of the same group, thereby creating a sense of collective unity. In addition to that, rituals have also been found to be a way for individuals to familiarize themselves with social norms, some suggesting that the primary purpose of any ritual is to impart that informal learning to the individual and to increase his or her social awareness.

== Cultural impact ==
The use of rituals and traditions such as weddings, bar mitzvahs, funerals and baptisms to celebrate and denote the life cycle transitions have been found to offer the members of a family to reaffirm their status and identity within the household. In addition to the reaffirmation of status within the family, the performance of rituals specific to a certain subculture also affords individuals the opportunity to identify and connect with the members of that specific subculture.

Lancy also offers a unique perspective on the impact that the performance of life cycle rituals may have on an individual's role in society. He notes that in indigenous populations, children who undergo specific rites to denote a transition from phase of life to another are usually self-sufficient not long after puberty. In contrast, he observes that in modern bourgeoisie societies where rituals and milestones are foregone in favor of comparison to standardized development milestones, children often have a prolonged period of adolescence lasting into their twenties before they become self-sufficient, something he defines as a form of "learned helplessness".

Following cultural standards, life cycle rituals are practiced based on specific beliefs and rites. One's acceptance of their culture, and involvement with society, is associated with their implementation of these practices. The structural functionalism is seen to maintain societies in a "steady state" and preserve a specific status quo. Such practices relieve the stress individuals may be exposed to as a result of the significant changes and restructure they must undergo as a natural progression of growth. The rituals can assist in providing instruction and approval of the new roles that must subsequently be adopted. The resulting feeling of belonging also provides encouragement to not be disturbed or displaced by these changes, and instead welcome them as a part of life and affirm the social and moral values expressed. Hence, these sociocultural practices foster unity through communal actions.

== Modern-day changes ==
In developed countries, as people live longer and become more affluent, there has been a shift in the practices of life cycle rituals. Newly conceptualized stages have emerged, such as "bridal shower", "baby shower", "bachelor/bachelorette party", "mid-life" and "empty nest". These celebrations are derived from evolving stages in a life and signify progression and change. They can be culminated and categorized under traditional classifications of the life cycle rituals, and represent the dynamic growth of society and culture in today's modern and technologically advanced world.

Traditional rites have also been revived and expanded, specifically due to the influence and development of the women's movement demanding equal rights. Geffen states that this has resulted in mothers, as well as fathers, demanding inclusion in birth, adolescent and marriage rituals for themselves and for their sons and daughters. Such practices encourage unity and equality within society. They also shun previously held beliefs of the male sex being dominant and superior, and instead encourage more practices that celebrate the female sex on equal footing.
