= Indigenous architecture in the United States =

Indigenous architecture in the United States reflects the histories of Native Americans through contemporary design. Many Indigenous nations have adopted modern architectural styles for new cultural centers, memorials, and museums. These modern designs are often combined with symbolic elements that connect the buildings to generations of tradition. The integration of traditional architecture into modern structures symbolizes how Indigenous peoples maintain their cultural identity while also becoming a more visible part of today's society.

== American Southwest ==
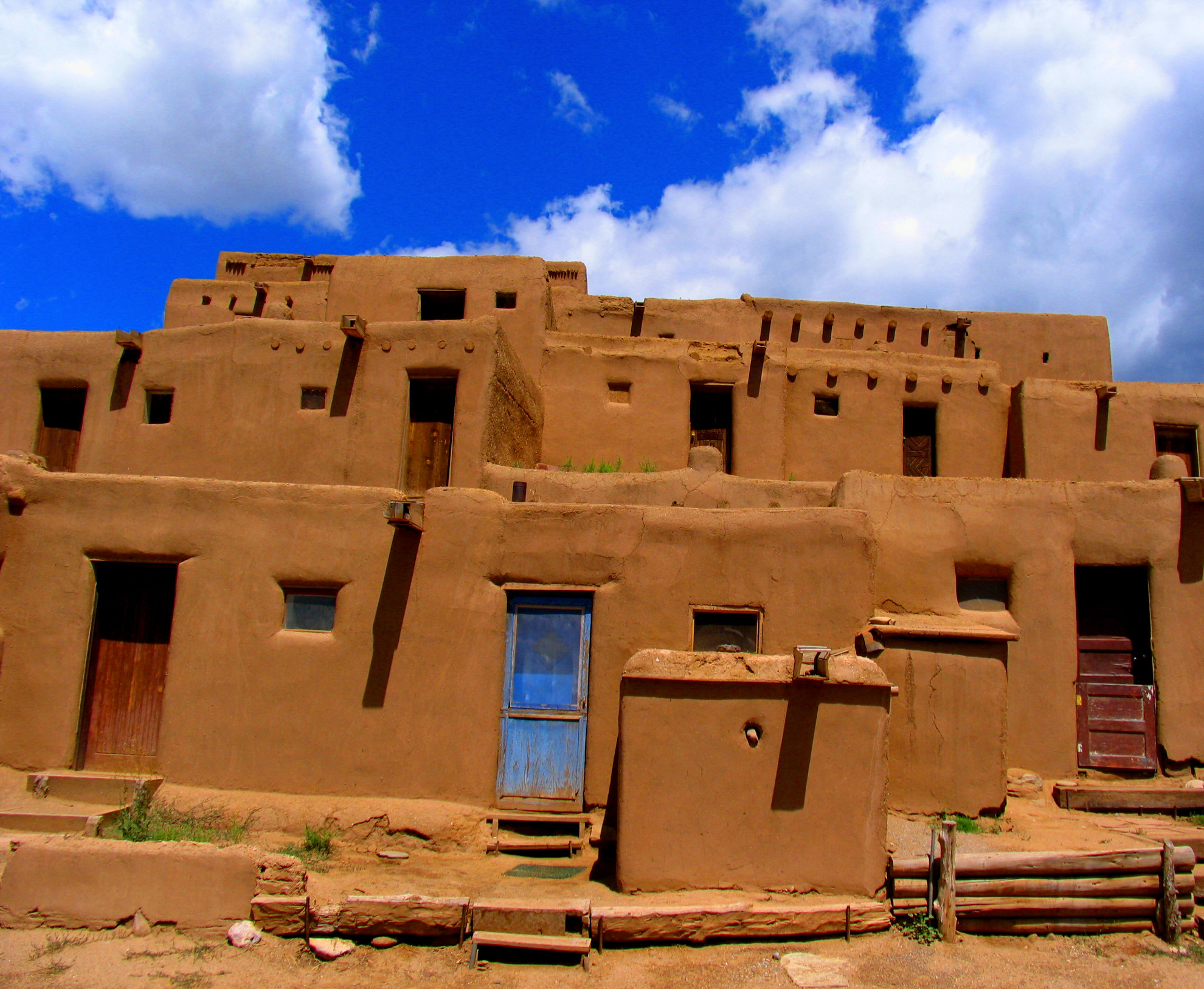
Taos Pueblo from Taos, New Mexico

Pueblo architecture is a lasting aspect of Indigenous architecture in the American Southwest. The original Pueblo style was based on the Anasazi people, who began building square cliff dwellings around 1150 CE, featuring subterranean chambers and circular ceremonial rooms. Over time, Pueblo architecture evolved into the construction of permanent, angular homes made from limestone blocks or adobe, a mixture of clay and water. Pueblos were also built using thick slabs of quarried sandstone. Variations in water sources and climate often influenced the choice of building materials. Pueblo homes had thick walls and small windows to minimize heat. These houses were frequently multi-storied, with rooms decreasing in size with each level. Pueblos were typically inhabited by both nuclear and extended families, with interconnected rooms to accommodate this. Most pueblos included one or two below-ground kivas, large circular rooms used for ceremonial purposes. While pueblos were often built along the periphery of villages, a central space was usually reserved for a large courtyard to emphasize community.

=== Pueblo architecture in modern society ===
While most Indigenous people in modern society use their traditional architecture primarily for ceremonial purposes, Pueblo architecture remains one of the few styles still regularly used today. In the Southwest, the culture associated with Pueblo architecture continues through the construction of modern buildings that share many features with traditional Puebloan structures. Although many modern Pueblo-style buildings are more colorful and have larger windows, the traditional box-like shapes of stone and earthen Pueblos heavily influence these designs. A notable example is the Pojoaque Pueblo Council Chambers, designed by sculptor and Pueblo governor George Rivera. Rivera designed the building with thick, angular earthen walls and a color palette of browns and tans that reflect traditional Pueblo architecture. The Council Chambers serves not only as a cultural center for Puebloan Indigenous peoples but also as a monument to their long history.

=== Navajo ===
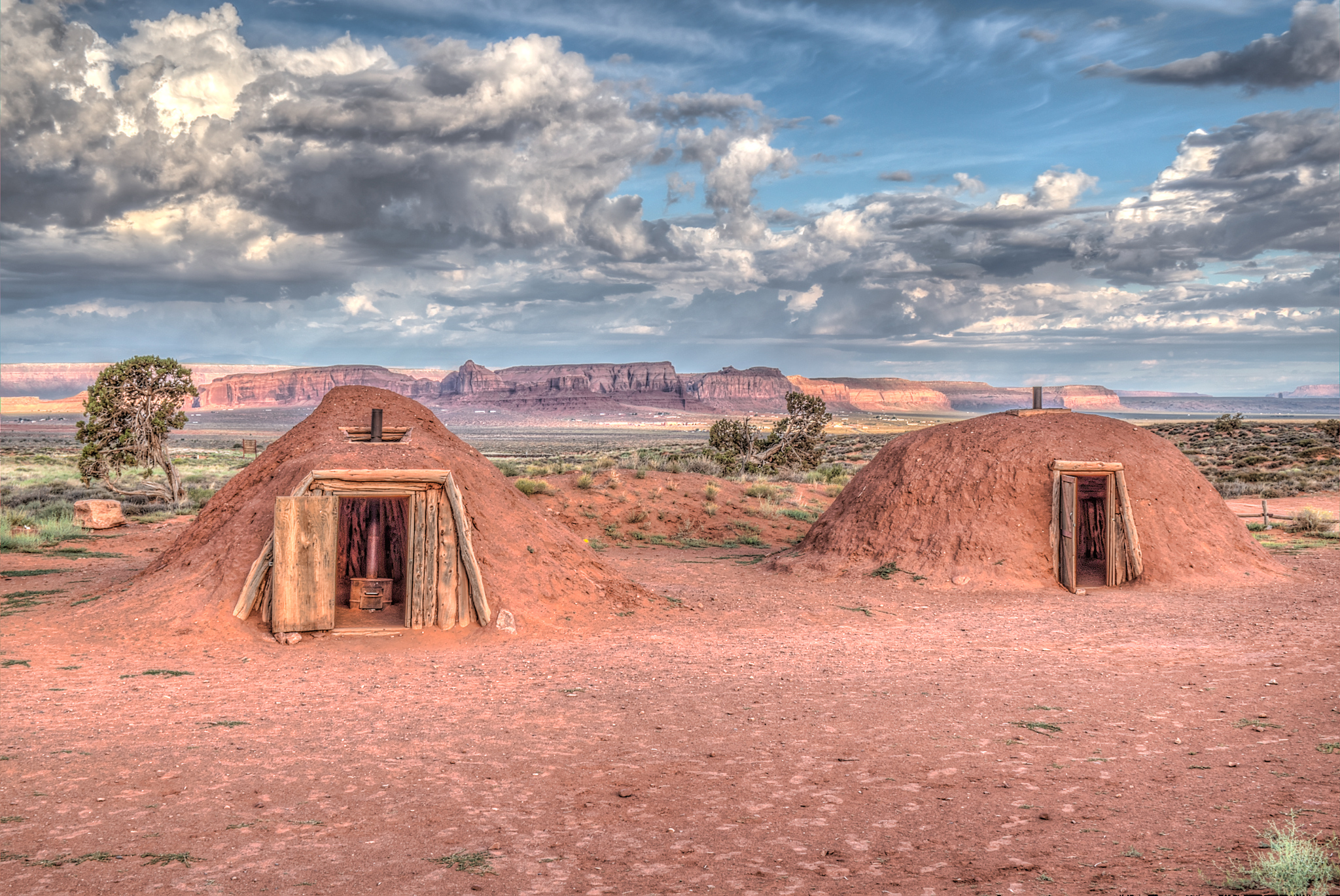
Hogan at Monument Valley Navajo Tribal Park

A hogan, the traditional Navajo home, is built as a shelter for either a man or a woman. Male hogans are square or conical with a distinct rectangular entrance, while a female hogan is an eight-sided house. Hogans are traditionally made of logs and covered in mud, with the door always facing east to welcome the sun each morning. Navajos also have several types of hogans for lodging and ceremonial use. Ceremonies, such as healing ceremonies or the kinaaldá, take place inside a hogan. According to Kehoe, this style of housing is distinctive to the Navajos. She writes, "Even today, a solidly constructed, log-walled Hogan is preferred by many Navajo families." Most Navajo people today live in apartments and houses in urban areas.

Those who practice the Navajo religion regard the hogan as sacred. The religious song "The Blessingway" (hózhǫ́ǫ́jí) describes the first hogan as being built by Coyote with help from Beavers to be a house for First Man, First Woman, and Talking God. The Beaver People gave Coyote logs and instructions on how to build the first hogan. Navajos made their hogans in the traditional style until the 1900s, when they started to make them in hexagonal and octagonal shapes. Hogans continue to be used as dwellings, especially by older Navajos, although they tend to be made with modern construction materials and techniques. Some are maintained specifically for ceremonial purposes.

== Great Plains ==
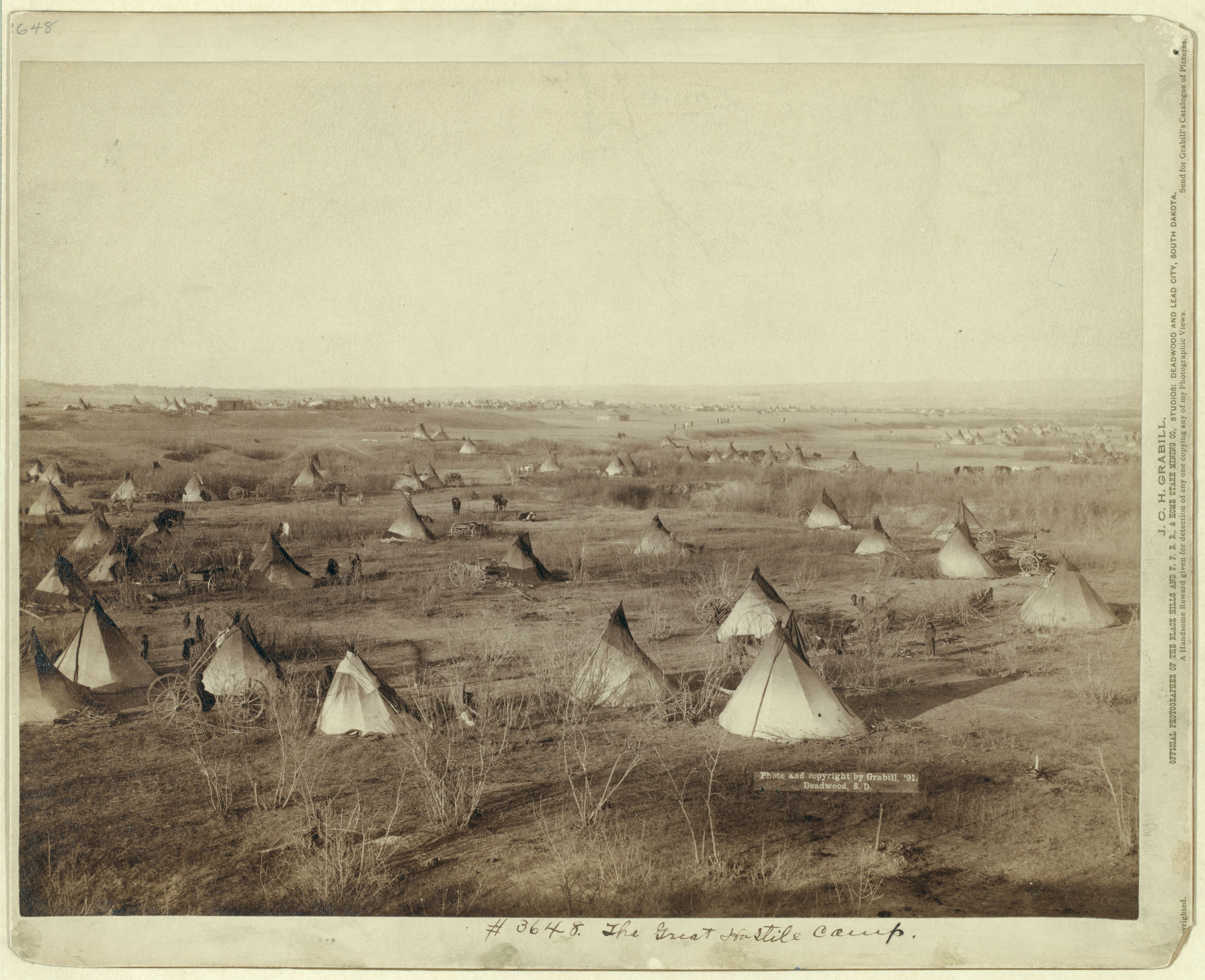
Bird's-eye view of a Lakota camp

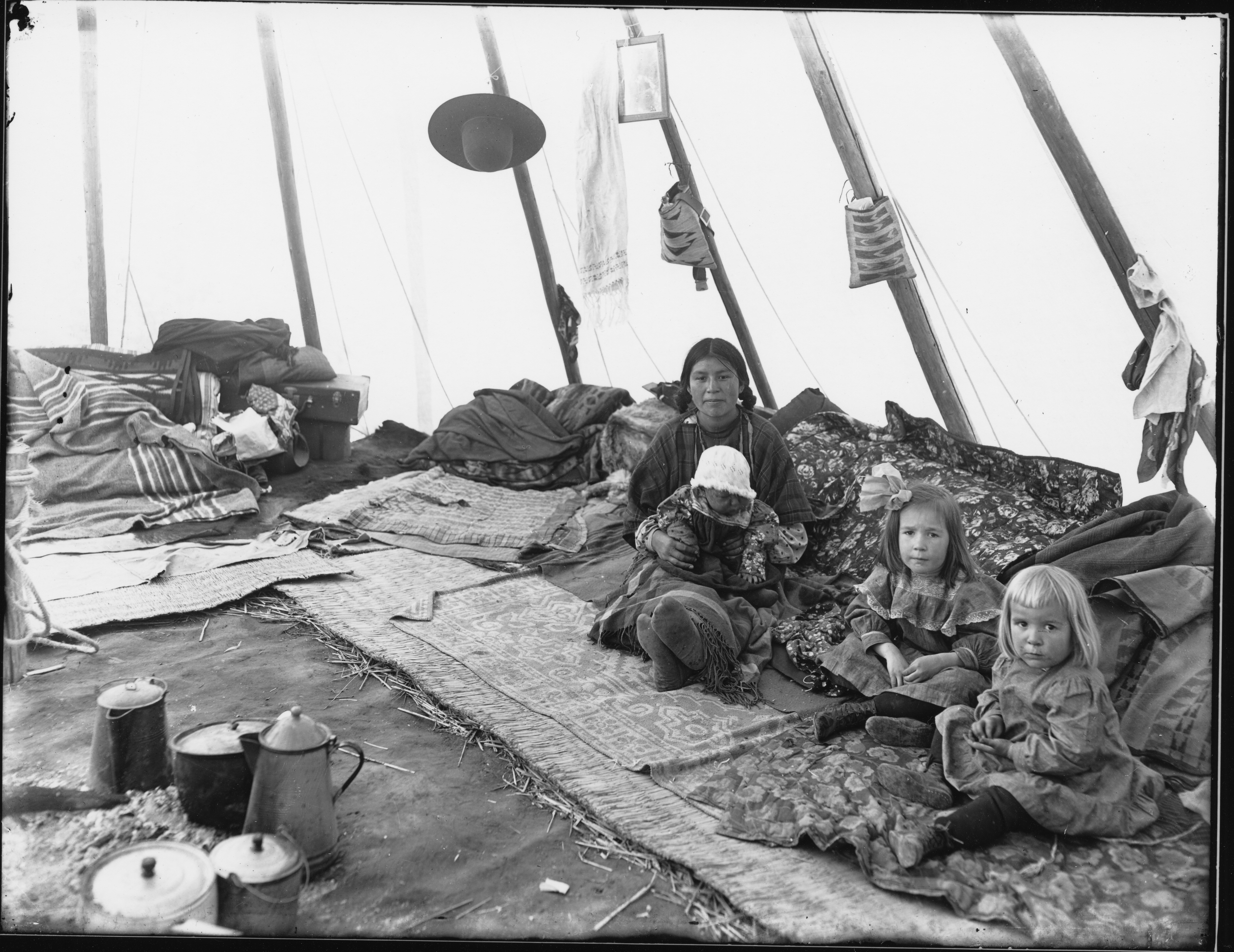
Woman and children sitting inside a tipi

The Indigenous peoples of the Great Plains are often recognized by the tipi. These peoples were nomadic, following the great herds of bison and other big game across the plains. The simple, collapsible construction of the tipi allowed it to be easily taken down and reassembled, making it ideal for a nomadic lifestyle. Additionally, the building materials used in tipis were easy to replace when they wore out. Tipis are conical in shape, consisting of up to ten poles wrapped in animal skins. They typically have an interior space ranging from 80 to 175 square feet and traditionally housed one family. A flap in the animal skins serves as a doorway, and a hole in the center of the tipi's roof allows smoke and heat to escape. In Lakota culture, the four sides of a tipi represent both space and time. The tipi itself symbolizes the world, with each corner embodying one of the four cardinal directions. Each quadrant of the tipi represents one of the four seasons, and together, the combination of directions and seasons represents the cyclical, constant nature of time's passage.

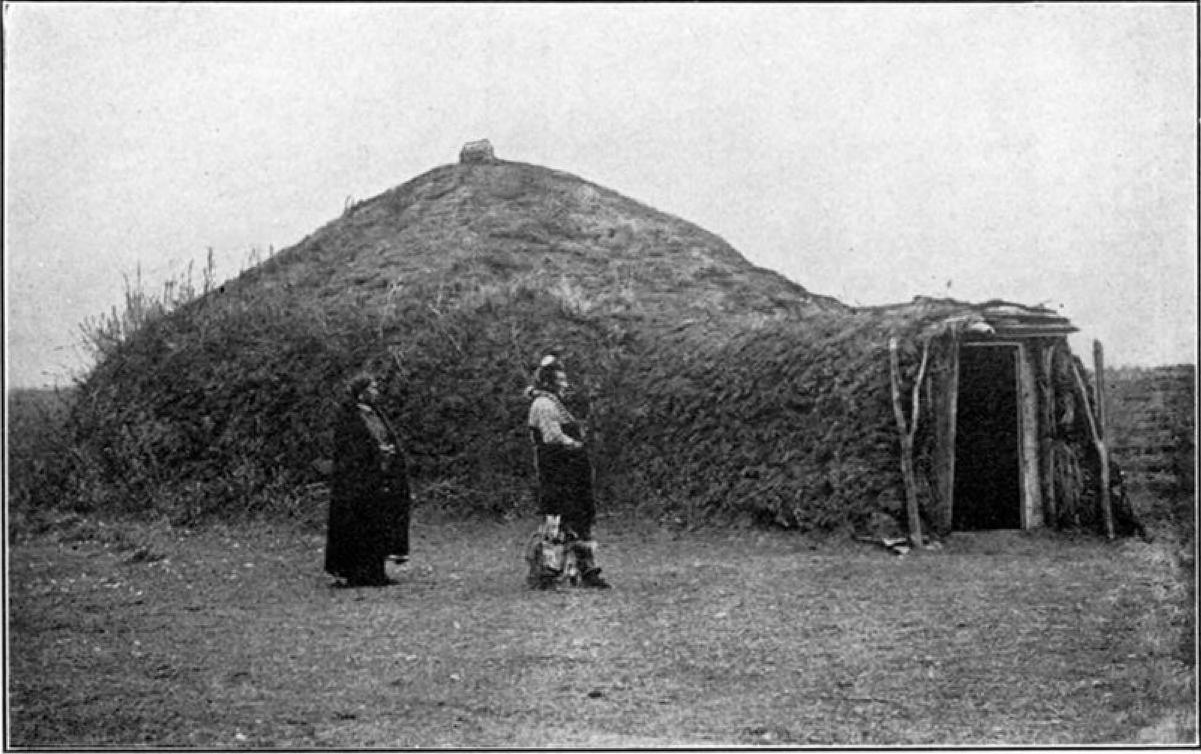
An earth lodge of the Omaha people in Nebraska

Though not as well known as the tipi, tribes on the Great Plains also built more permanent structures known as earth lodges. While still conical in shape, earth lodges were much larger and more stable than tipis. These structures were reinforced with wooden poles, and a deer-hoof rattle often served as a knocker on each door. Earth lodges typically housed three generations of a family and were usually owned by the women of each household.

On the southern plains, grass houses were also constructed. Similar in shape to wickiups, grass houses could reach up to 40 feet in height. Built primarily by the Caddo Nation, these residences were made from thatched switchgrass covering a hemispherical wooden frame.

=== Tipi architecture in modern society ===
Although not as commonly used by Indigenous peoples of the Great Plains today, tipis still serve as important cultural symbols. Buildings of cultural significance are often constructed with the traditional conical shape of a tipi. For example, the Shakopee Mdewakanton Sioux Community Center is a large structure with an exterior made of cloth-like material segmented by large supporting beams, all forming the conical shape of a tipi. Similarly, Four Winds School on the Spirit Lake Reservation in North Dakota incorporates tipi-inspired architecture. The school consists of several rooms extending from a tall, triangular central room. The central room features a skeleton of crisscrossing beams, resembling the framework of a tipi, and a real tipi is used for ceremonial purposes at the center of the building. Another example is the Mystic Lake Casino, where spotlights arranged in a circle on the roof project beams of light into the sky at a slight angle. These beams cross over each other at a single point, mimicking the shape of a tipi. Pointing the tipi-shaped projection up at the stars is especially symbolic, as the opening to a circle of tipis was often oriented to align with the rising sun.

== Northwest Coast ==
Indigenous peoples of the Northwest Coast constructed massive plank longhouses, often measuring up to 100 feet long and 25 feet wide. The walls of these longhouses were made from stacked planks of cedar wood, which were cut using beaver teeth and stone axes. The longhouses had low, pitched roofs to efficiently disperse heat and featured a single door at each end. Chiefs were responsible for assigning families to different sections of the longhouse. When the owner of a longhouse died, the house was either incinerated or passed on to a new family.

=== Modern society ===
Cedar plank longhouses are still constructed today, though most now use a concrete skeleton for increased stability. The Neah Bay Cultural Center of the Makah Nation in Washington state is built with cedar planks to reflect the traditional longhouses on their reservation. The Native American Student Center at Oregon State University is another example of contemporary longhouse construction, with its design symbolizing the close-knit community aspects of longhouse living. While modern longhouses often serve as spaces for large groups, they are also built on a smaller scale. Lawrence Joe of the Upper Skagit Reservation constructed a longhouse as a healing space, using it to help troubled youths adjust to higher-quality living conditions.

== East Coast ==
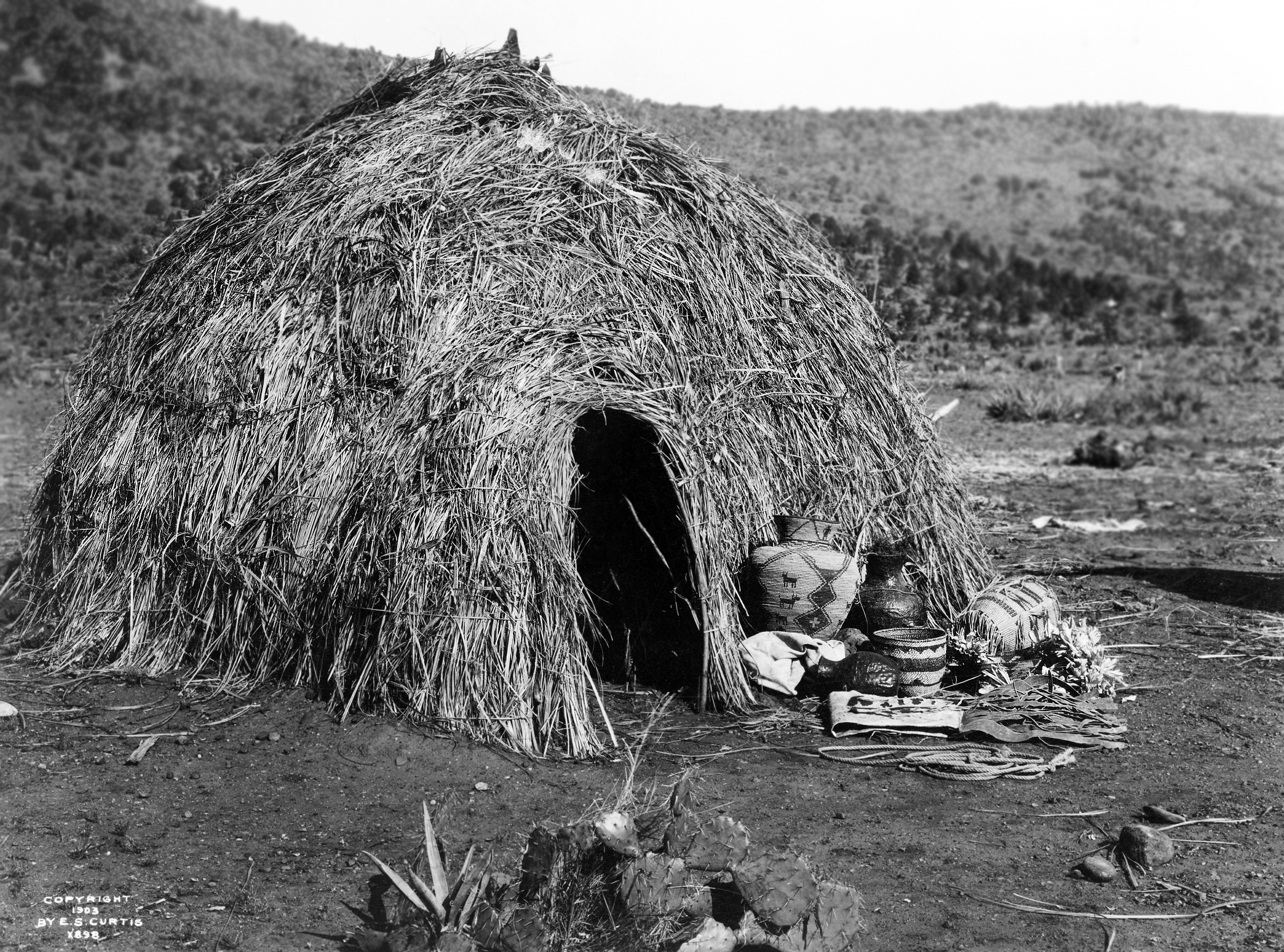
An Apache wickiup, photo taken by Edward Curtis in 1903

While longhouses of Northwest Coast Indigenous peoples were mainly constructed from parallel cedar planks, those built by East Coast tribes were made from tree saplings tied together at their tops to form a latticed, domed structure. This served as the skeleton of the longhouse, which was then covered with shingles or panels of bark. Multiple families inhabited each longhouse, although they were often divided into compartments at right angles. Communal fire pits in the central aisle were used for both cooking and heating, and an open hole in the roof served as a chimney.

Wickiups, also known as wigwams, were used by tribes of the Eastern American coast. They were constructed from the same materials as East Coast longhouses but were hemispherical in shape. Wickiups typically housed one family and could range in diameter from 15 to 20 feet.

== Contemporary Indigenous architecture ==
By creating modern works of architecture that represent long-standing traditions, Indigenous peoples are able to assert their presence in contemporary society and showcase their history. Colonialism, invasion, and relocation have significantly diminished the ability of Indigenous peoples to define themselves through their architectural practices. Indigenous architecture serves as a reminder that the culture it represents is much older than the oppression Indigenous peoples have faced. By combining modern building practices with traditional architectural styles, Indigenous communities can use architecture to demonstrate both their individuality and their presence in society.

Due to years of under-representation, many Americans have a skewed perspective on the Indigenous peoples of North America. Additionally, many museums have failed to educate the public on how Indigenous architecture intertwines with their traditions. Efforts are currently underway to create architecture-specific exhibits on Indigenous peoples, with the primary goal of enabling the public to directly associate various architectural features with the cultural aspects they represent. At the Indian Pueblo Cultural Center, a LiDAR-generated interactive display called iArchitecture allows visitors to virtually explore specific buildings connected to the Pueblo people of the region. Modern advancements in education through architecture will play a crucial role in demonstrating to the public the significance of architecture in the culture of the Indigenous peoples it represents.

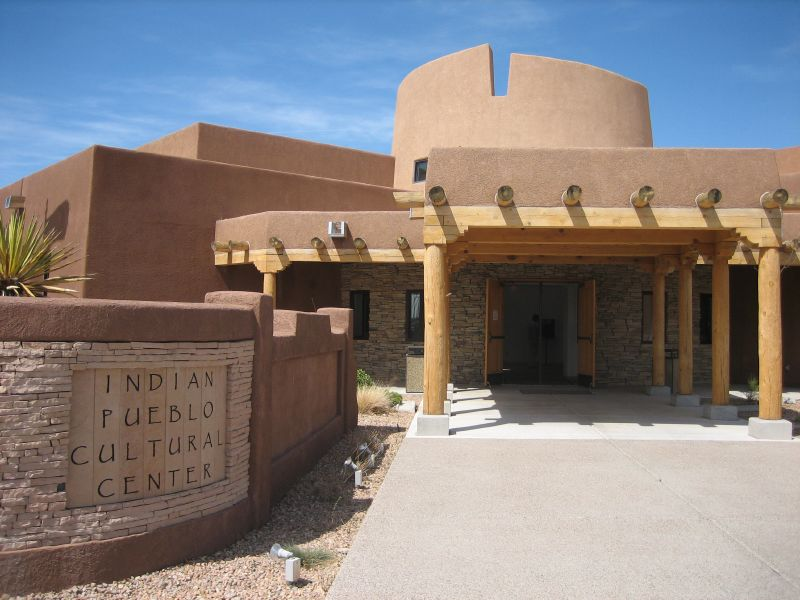
Indian Pueblo Cultural Center

While still used by many Indigenous peoples, Indigenous architecture has transitioned from being primarily spiritually based to more practical. Although incorporating Indigenous architecture into modern society helps ensure its influence endures, this shift towards less culturally focused architecture can lead to a loss of connection to the culture from which these structures originated. This is particularly true for Pueblo architecture. At the University of New Mexico's Indigenous Design and Planning Institute, techniques such as 3-D imaging and laser-generated modeling are being employed not only to teach aspiring Indigenous architects but also for use in museums. The goal of the institute is to leverage technological advancements to engage the public in learning more about Indigenous architecture.

=== Schooling ===
A crucial part of preserving Indigenous architecture is ensuring that there are sufficient institutions with programs dedicated to it. Prominent Indigenous architects such as Tamarah Begay, Rau Hoskins, Daniel Glenn, Kevin O'Brien, and Rewi Thompson have been working to promote curricula on Indigenous architecture across North America. Under Article 12 of the Declaration on the Rights of Indigenous Peoples, Indigenous peoples have the right to their own traditions and customs. Upholding this right includes providing adequate educational opportunities for Indigenous architects, as their architecture is closely linked to their culture. The University of New Mexico and the University of Saskatchewan both offer undergraduate programs in Indigenous architecture, and continued advocacy for such programs suggests that more institutions are likely to introduce similar programs in the future.

=== Prominent Indigenous architects ===
Indigenous architects such as Tamarah Begay, Kevin O'Brien, Tammy Eagle Bull, and Sam Olbekson have played significant roles in advancing architecture that reflects Indigenous culture and community needs. Their work includes promoting culturally informed design, supporting Indigenous representation in the field, and contributing to projects that serve Indigenous communities.

Tamarah Begay has spent over 10 years working with Indigenous tribes on societal improvement projects. She is also the founder of an architectural firm owned by Navajo women. Known for incorporating sustainability into her designs, Begay is a founding member of the American Indian Council of Architects and Engineers.

Kevin O'Brien is one of the most well-known Indigenous architects in North America. He is recognized for forging a deep connection between his projects and the Earth, as well as for promoting Indigenous culture through architecture. In 2018, O'Brien joined BVN Architects as a principal. One of his most famous projects, called Blak Box, is an aluminum rectangle with no floor. Used for Indigenous storytelling, its lack of a base creates a physical connection to the ground on which it stands.

A member of the Lakota Nation and the first Indigenous U.S. licensed architect, Tammy Eagle Bull owns her own architecture firm and is a former president of AIA Nebraska. She was largely inspired by her father, who helped her learn to see the world from a 3D perspective and understand how to address the injustices she observed through a path in architecture. She strives to enhance the influence Indigenous peoples have in creating their own architecture, allowing them to decide how they want their societies to be shaped. Through her work, Eagle Bull has helped Indigenous peoples across North America illustrate their histories and culture through architecture.

Sam Olbekson is an Indigenous architect dedicated to using his talents to establish greater equality for Indigenous peoples. With over 25 years of experience, Olbekson works on architectural projects for Indigenous communities. He was inspired to become an architect by the disparities he observed while growing up in a poor, largely Indigenous neighborhood. He is a citizen of the White Earth Nation in Minnesota and the founder and CEO of Full Circle Indigenous Planning and Design.

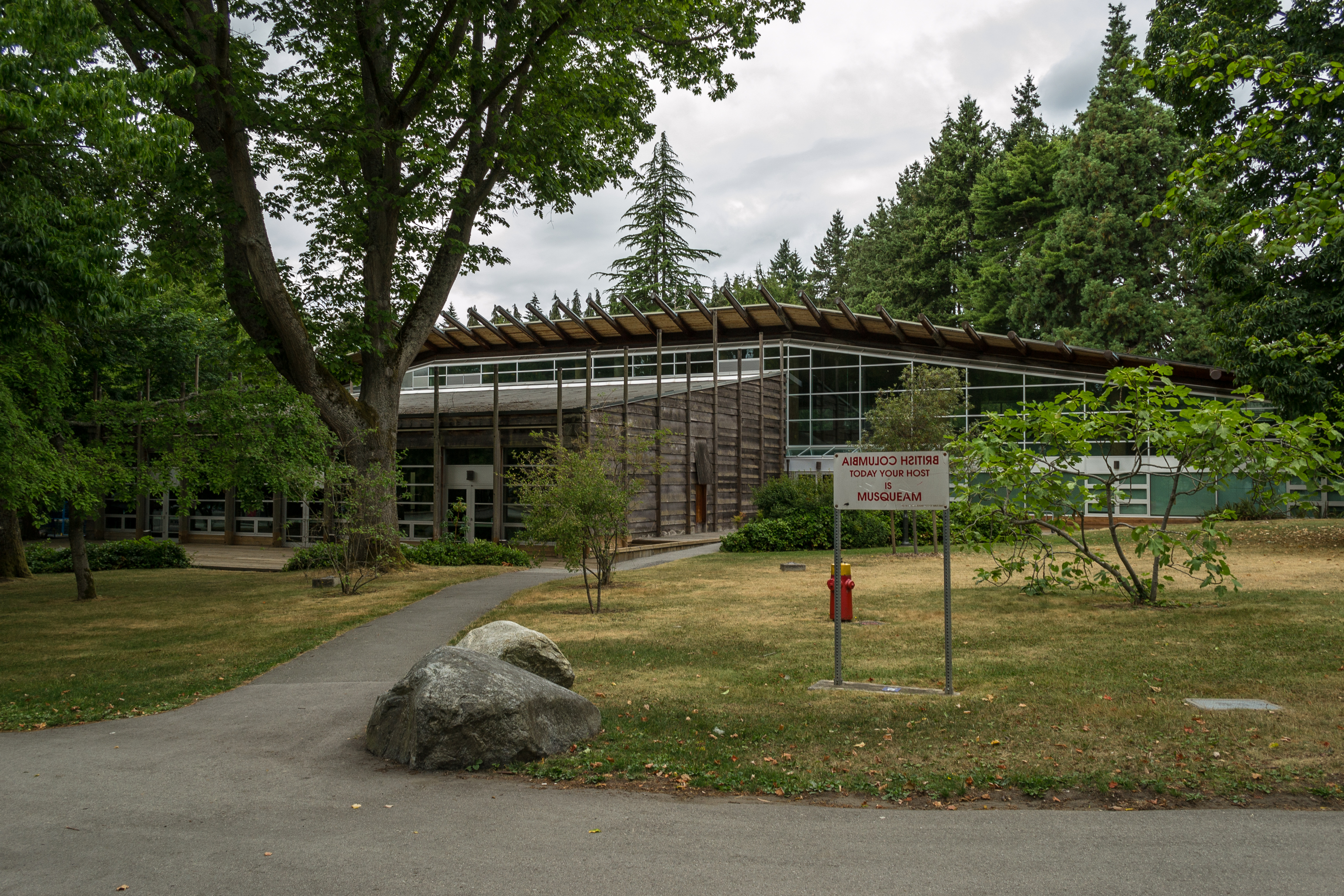
The First Nations Longhouse at the University of British Columbia Vancouver. Built in 2003

=== Notable works ===
- Seneca-Cayuga Administration Center - Miami, Oklahoma (1977): The Seneca-Cayuga Administration Center features a rectangular frame, with the top of the frame displaying a repeated pattern of pixelated human figures holding hands. This design symbolizes the treaties made between the Seneca Nation and colonial America. The beaded pattern in the artwork represents wampum, ornamental jewelry often worn by young warriors.
- Four Winds School - North Dakota (1983): The Four Winds School consists of a large circular building divided into four equal quadrants. In Lakota culture, each of the four directions represents a different wind, with each wind associated with a new, cleansing aspect of life. Together, they form the circle of life.
- Seneca-Iroquois National Museum - Salamanca, New York (1977): The Seneca-Iroquois National Museum features a longhouse-shaped central room, symbolizing the peace and sense of community associated with the multi-family living conditions of a traditional longhouse.
- The Shakopee Mdewakanton Community Center: The main structure of this community center is shaped like a massive tipi, featuring wooden structural beams and an outer shell with a cloth-like appearance similar to a real tipi. The tipi, symbolizing home and community, represents the sense of community offered by this building.
- UBC Longhouse, Vancouver: The UBC Longhouse is shaped like a traditional longhouse and is aligned with the sun's path so that the rising sun faces directly toward its ceremonial entrance. Tribal members were involved in the creation of the building from the early stages of construction. As a result, the building incorporates multiple symbols and design elements from various tribes in the region.
- Mystic Lake Casino: The Mystic Lake Casino features 12 spotlights on its roof, all pointing upward toward a central point. The arrangement of the lights mimics the shape of a tipi's structural poles, with each spotlight representing one pole. Visible from up to 30 miles away, the eye-catching pattern in the sky symbolizes the pride Indigenous peoples have in their culture and their ability to make a statement showcasing their traditions.

== Sources ==
- Iverson, Peter (2006). The Navajo. Jennifer Denetdale (additional text), Ada E. Deer (foreword). New York: Chelsea House Publishers. ISBN 0-7910-8595-3.
- Kehoe, Alice Beck (1992). North American Indians: A Comprehensive account (2nd ed.). Upper Saddle River (NJ): Prentice-Hall. ISBN 978-0136243625. (3rd edition, 2006, ISBN 978-0131928763)
