= Chindi =

Negative remainder of the dead in Navajo religious belief

In Navajo religious belief, a chindi (Navajo: chʼį́įdii) is the miasma left behind after a person dies, believed to leave the body with the deceased's last breath. It is everything that was negative about the person's life; pain, fear, anger, disappointment, dissatisfaction, resentment, and rejection as the "residue that man has been unable to bring into universal harmony". Traditional Navajo believe that contact with a chindi can cause illness and death. Chindi are believed to linger around the deceased's bones or possessions, so possessions are often destroyed after death and contact with bodies is avoided. The more personal the possession the stronger the chindi. After death, the deceased's name is never spoken, for fear that the chindi will hear and come and make one ill. Traditional Navajo practice is to allow death to occur outdoors, to allow the chindi to disperse. If a person dies in a house or hogan, that building is believed to be inhabited by the chindi and is abandoned.

== See also ==
- Enemy Way
- Vengeful ghost
