= Todos Santos Cuchumatán =

- Municipality
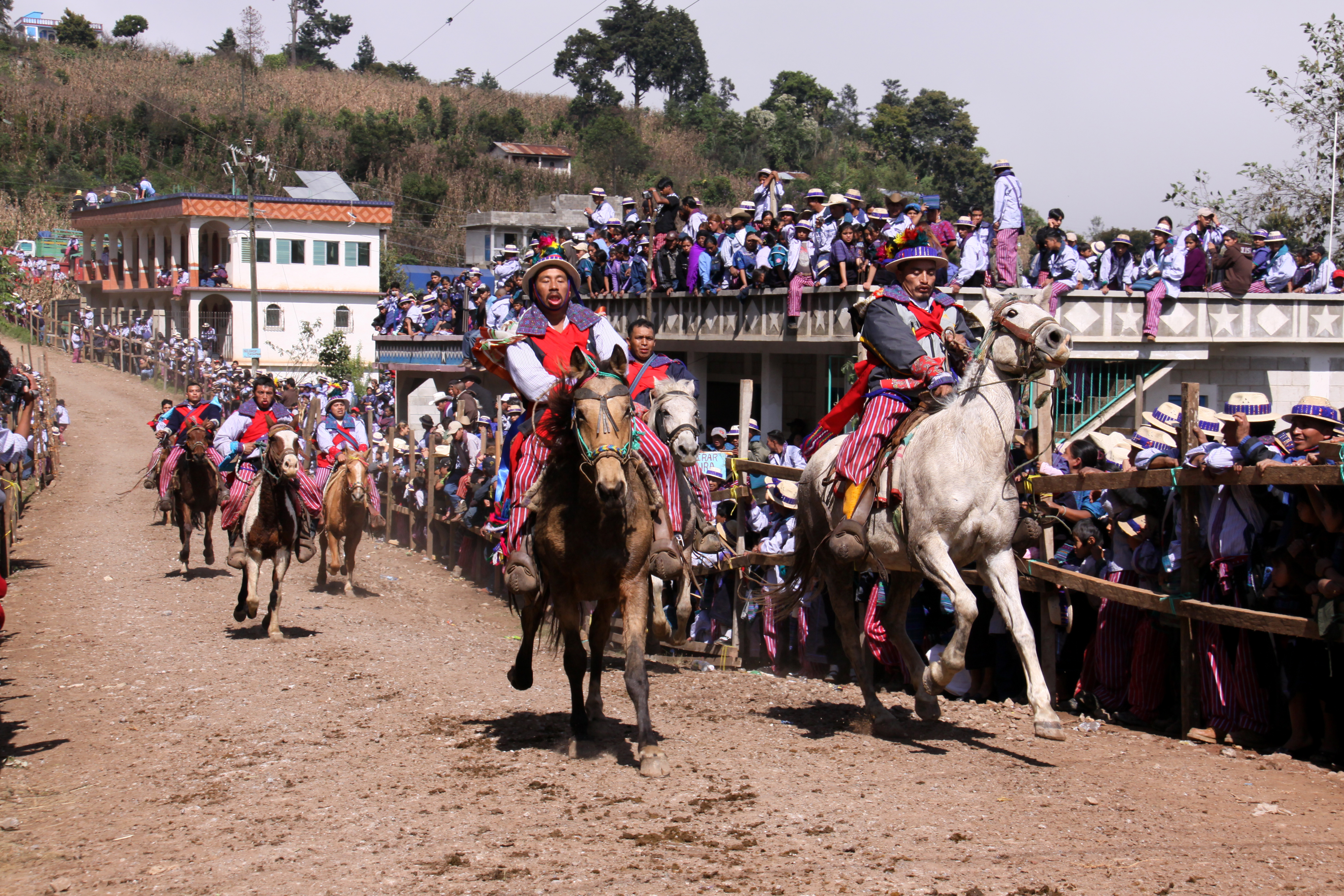
- Horse races in Todos Santos Cuchumatán

- Location in Guatemala
- Coordinates: 15°31′0″N 91°37′0″W
- Country: Guatemala
- Department: Huehuetenango
- Municipality: Todos Santos Cuchumatán

Government
  - Type: Municipal

Area
  - Municipality: 269 km^{2} (104 sq mi)
- Elevation: 2,500 m (8,200 ft)
- Highest elevation: 3,828 m (12,559 ft)

Population (Census 2002)
  - Municipality: 26,118
  - Urban: 2,980
  - Ethnicities: Mam Ladino
  - Religions: Roman Catholicism Evangelicalism Maya
- Climate: Cwb
- Website: http://www.inforpressca.com/todossantos/

Todos Santos Cuchumatán (Spanish pronunciation: [ˈtoðos ˈsantos kutʃumaˈtan]) is a municipality in the Guatemalan department of Huehuetenango. It is situated in the Sierra de los Cuchumatanes at an elevation of 2,500 m (about 8,000 ft). The municipality covers an area of approximately 269 km^{2} and is formed by the town of Todos Santos Cuchumatán, 6 villages, and 69 smaller rural communities, called caserios, parajes, and cantones. The village of San Martin Cuchumatán is the second largest urbanized centre in the municipality of Todos Santos. San Martin is also the agricultural heart of the Cuchumateca valley which produces crops like potatoes, broccoli and large scale cultivation of coffee on the lower mountain slopes of the municipality.

The population of Todos Santos is predominantly indigenous, of Mayan descent, most of whom still speak the Mayan language of Mam. The town is one of few places in Guatemala where indigenous men still wear their traditional clothing, along with the women.

An annual festival is celebrated on October 31–November 2, and is centered on All Saints' Day on November 1 ("Todos Santos" translates to "all saints" in English). Festivities include traditional dances, marimba music and the famous horse races. The horse races are often the scene of mayhem and bloodshed due to the riders' penchant to drink alcohol for days leading up to the races even though the mayor banned the selling of hard alcohol in May 2008.

In May 2000, a group of tourists from Japan and a bus driver were attacked by a large mob after members of the group took pictures of local children. The Guatemalan bus driver was doused with gasoline and burned to death, and one member of the Japanese tour group was stoned to death. Two other tourists were injured along with two police officers.

While visiting the market in Todos Santos, travelers are advised to exercise discretion when taking photographs. It is important to respect the privacy and cultural sensitivities of the local Mayan community. Photography of individuals—particularly children—should only be done with explicit permission. A notable incident occurred in 2000, when a misunderstanding involving a tourist resulted in a fatality. Persistent local rumors regarding child abduction have contributed to heightened concerns, and as a result, residents are understandably protective of their families. To prevent miscommunication or unintended offense, visitors are encouraged to seek consent before taking photographs.

== Other resources ==
- Two Crosses of Todos Santos by Maud Oakes, at the Open Library
- Beyond the Windy Place by Maud Oakes, at the Open Library
- Todos Santos Cuchumantan: Report from a Guatemalan Village
- Todos Santos: The Survivors.

== Image gallery ==
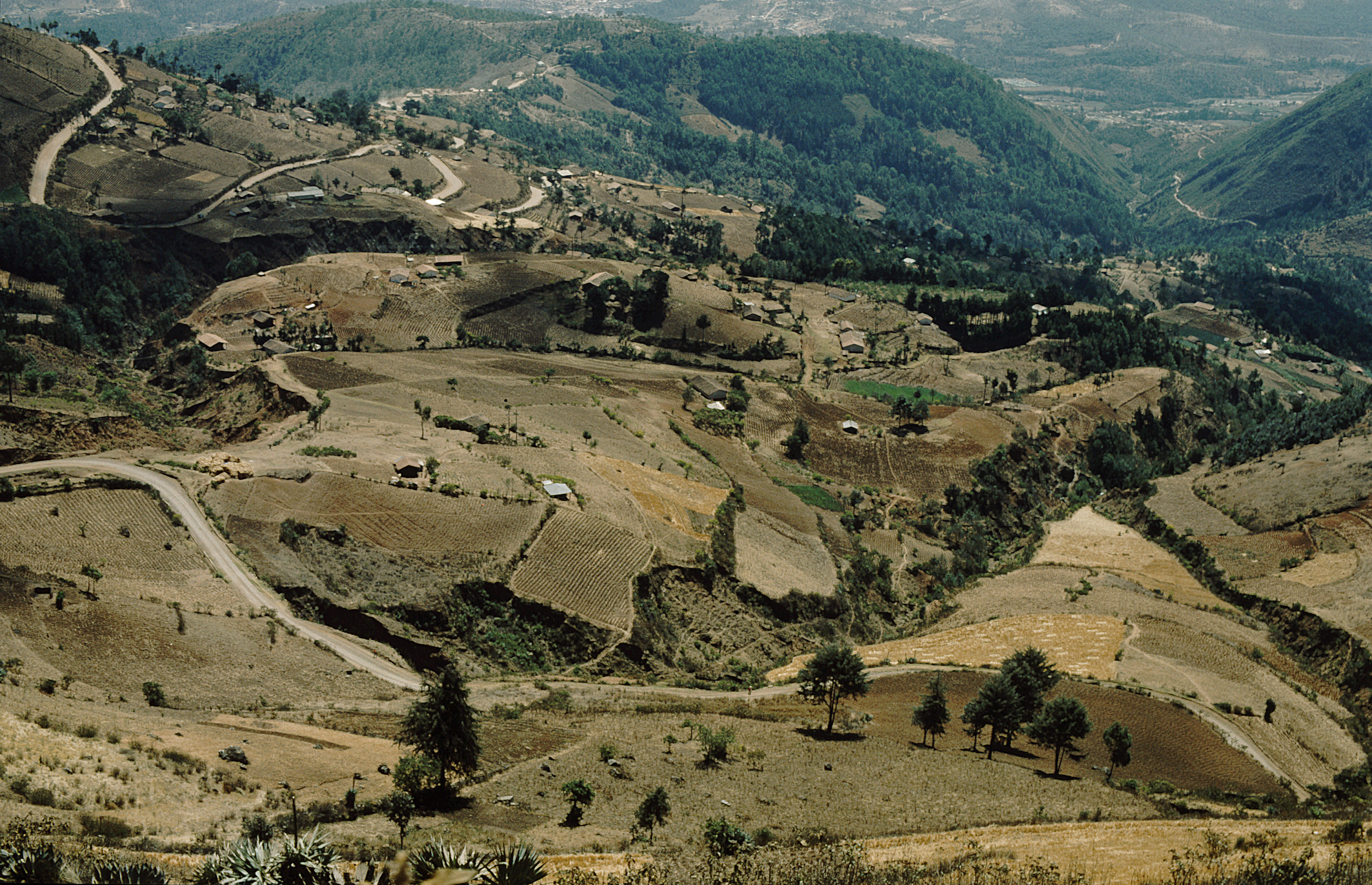
Scenery of Todos Santos Cuchumatán

Todos Santos Cuchumatán

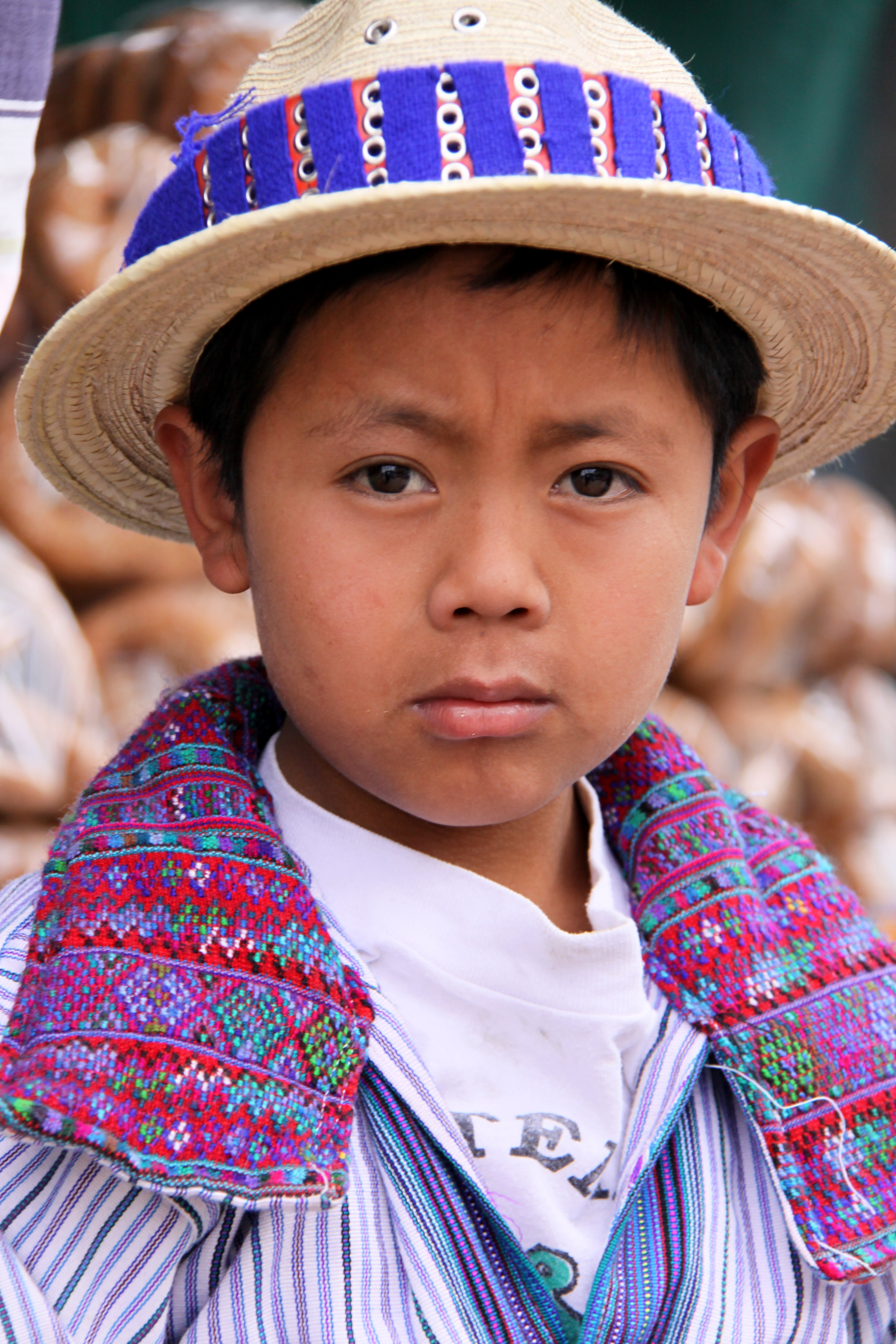

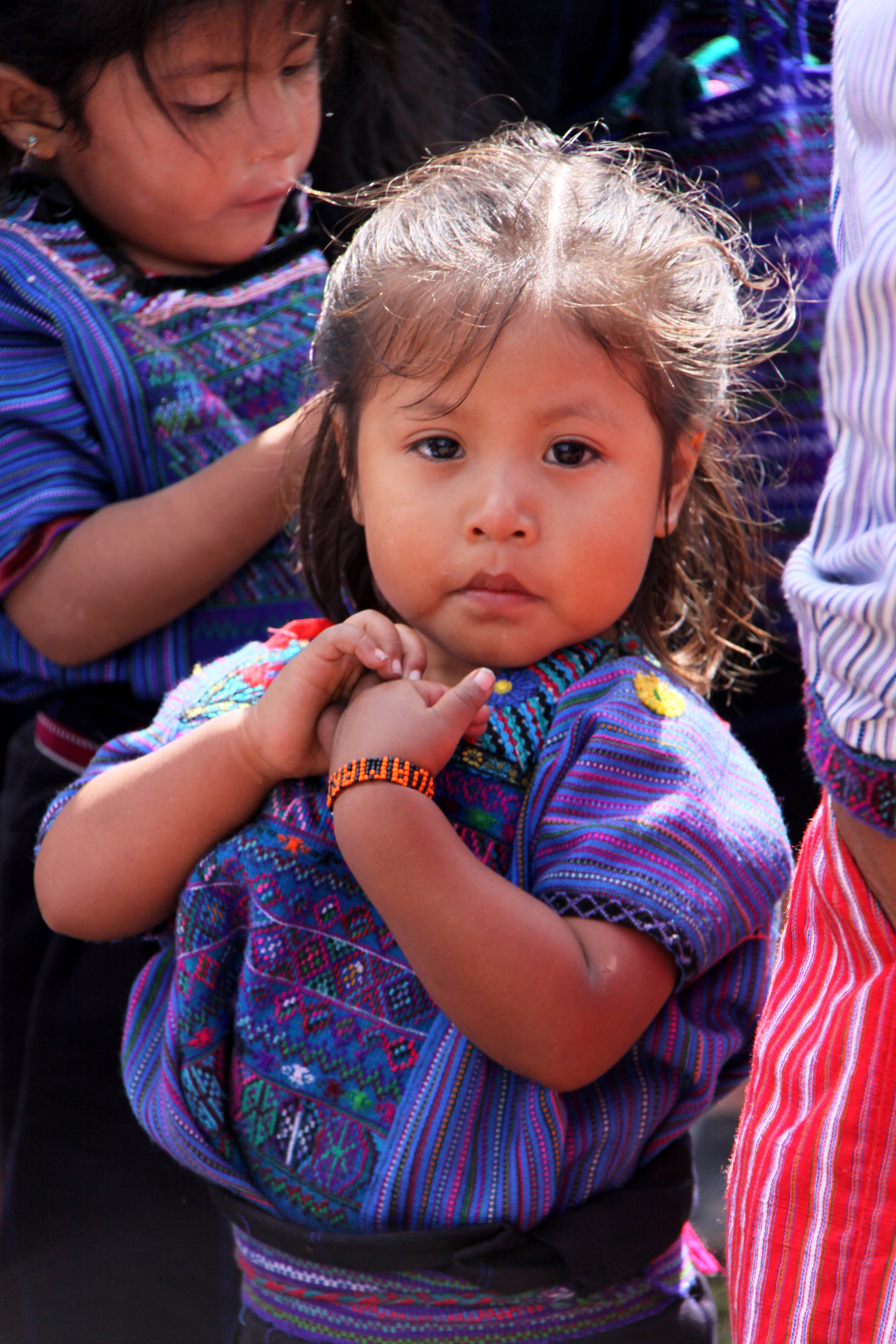

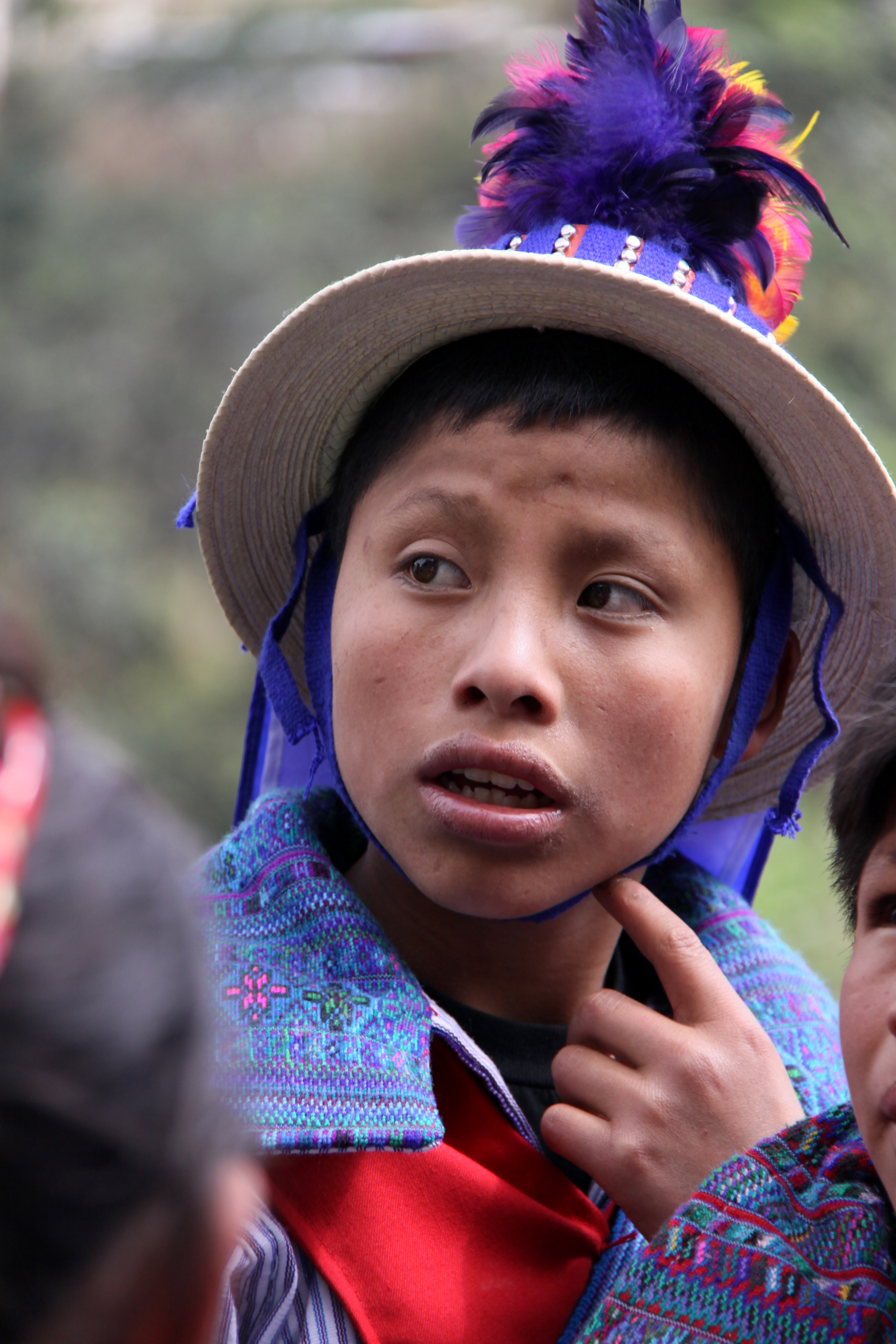

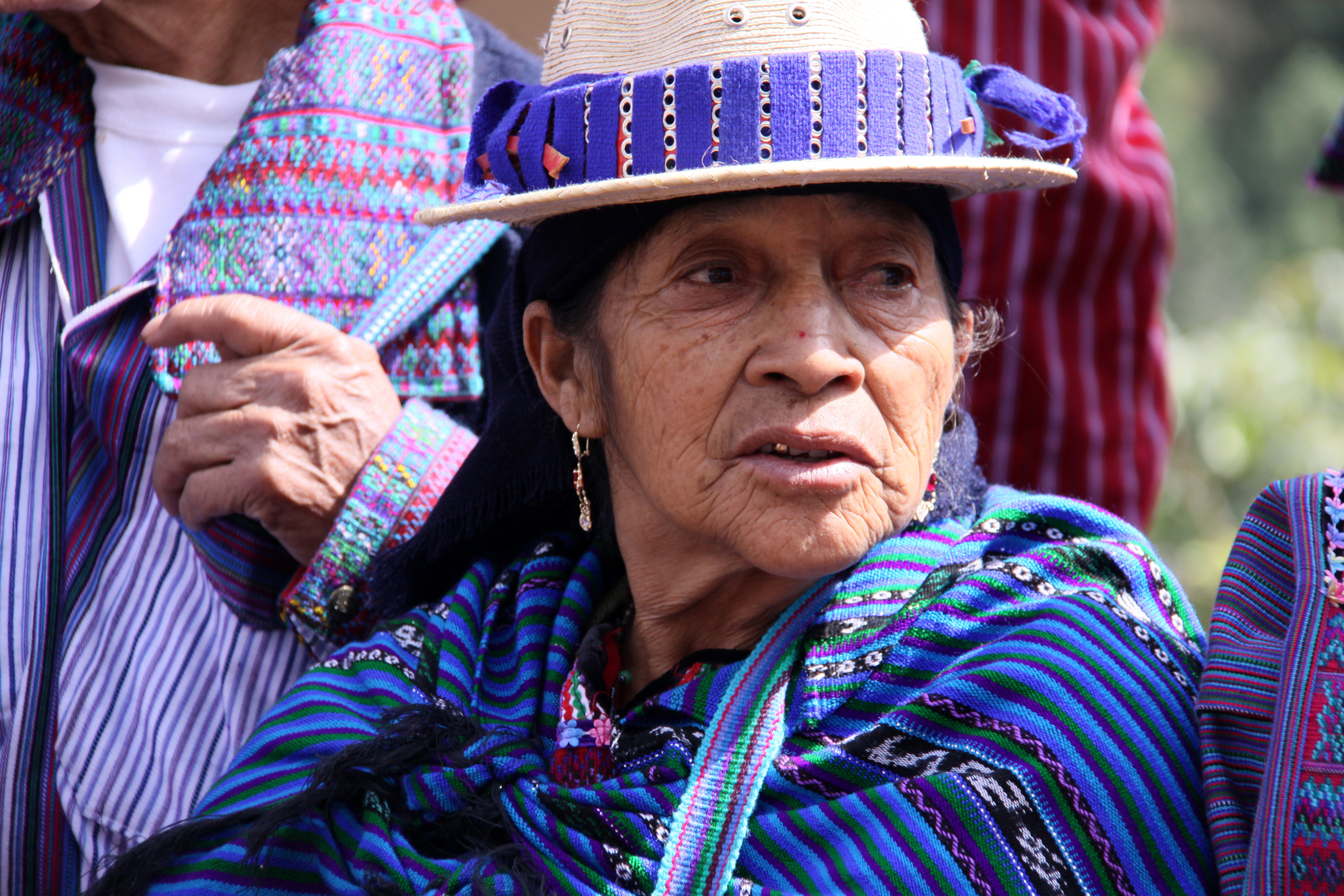

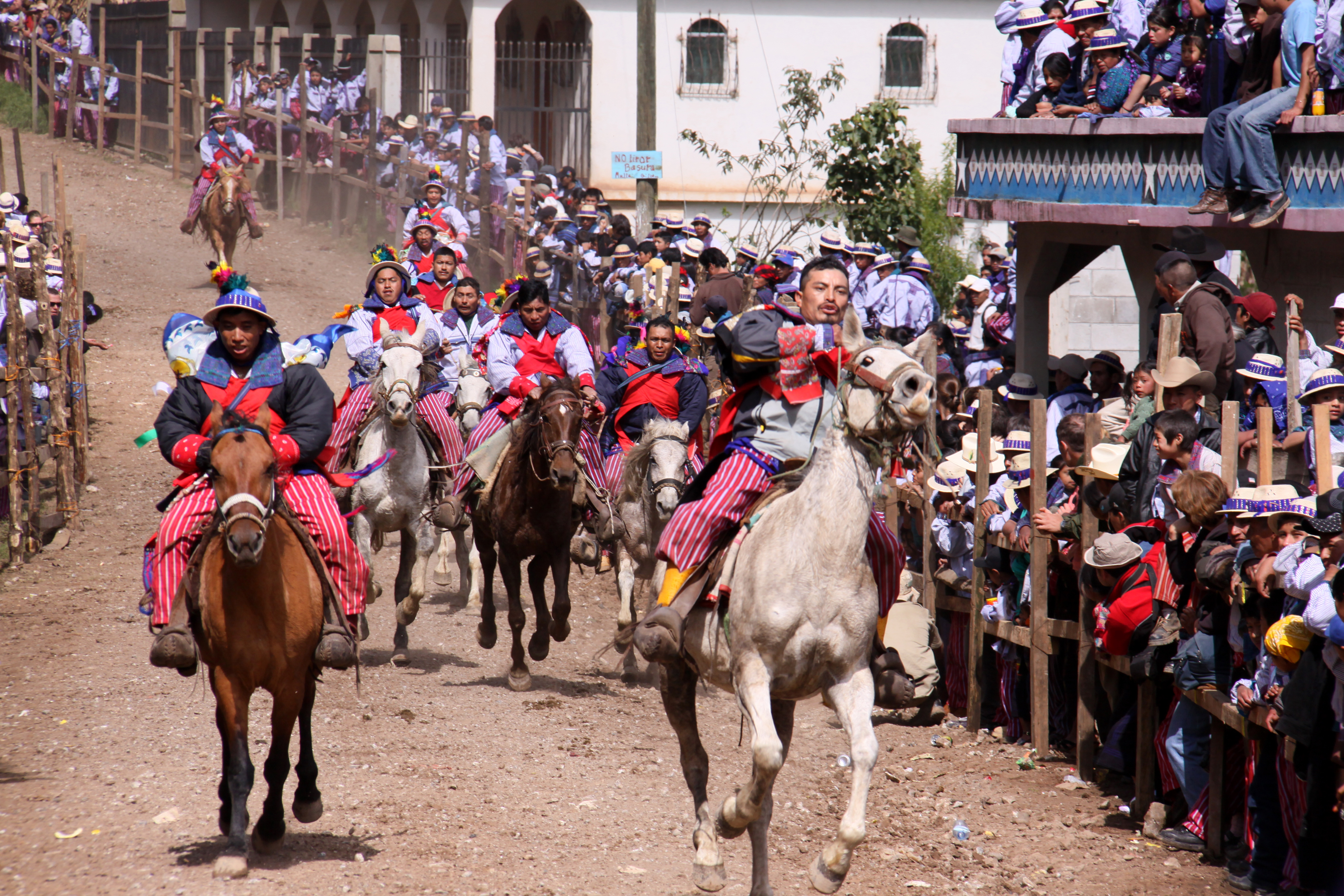

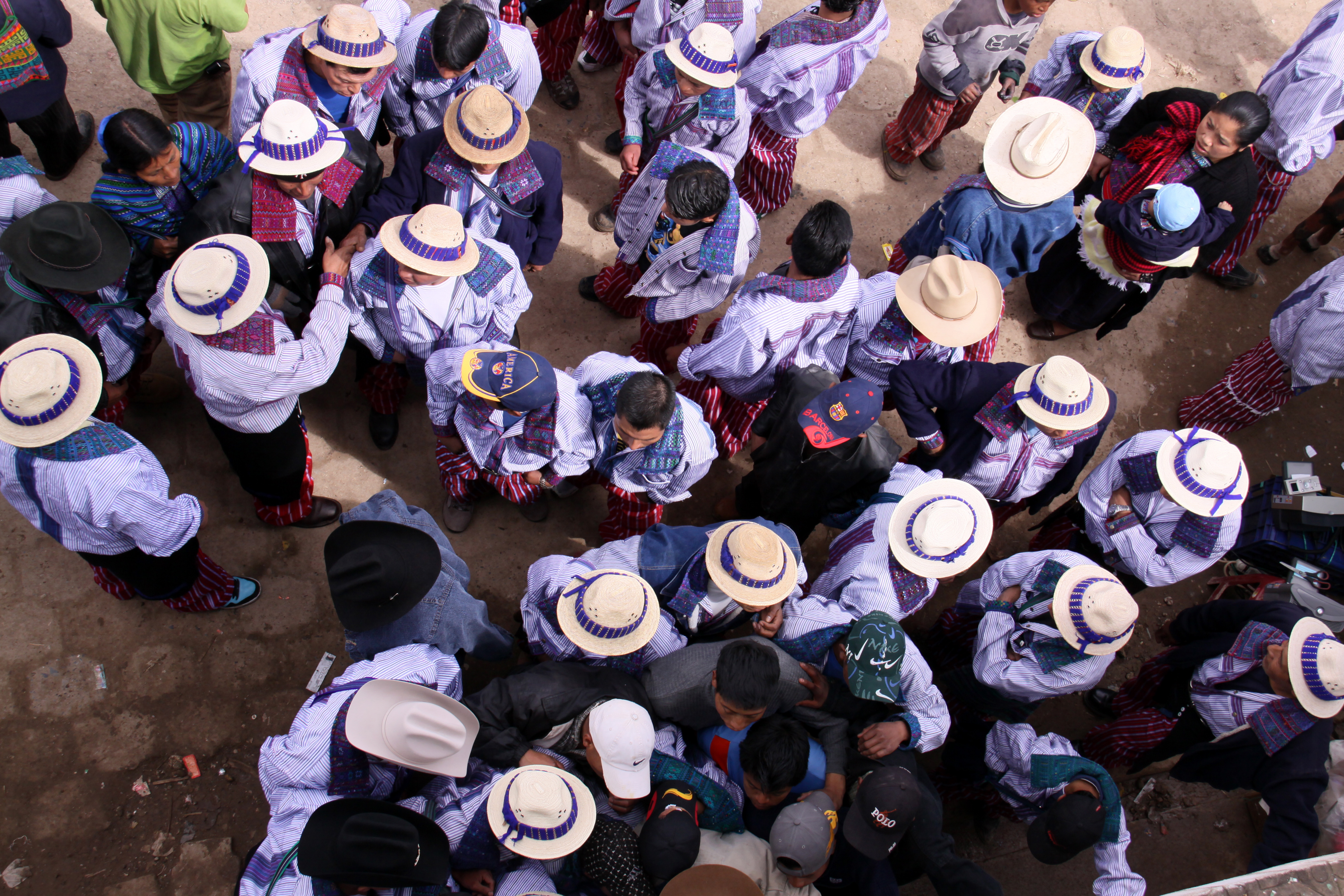
