= Maud Oakes =

American ethnologist, artist and writer

Maud Van Cortlandt Oakes
- Born: May 25, 1903; Seattle, Washington
- Died: June 10, 1990 (aged 87); Carmel, California
- Occupations: Ethnologist, writer
- Parents: Walter Oakes (1864–1911) (father); Mary Beekman (née Taylor) (mother)

Maud Van Cortlandt Oakes (1903–1990) was an ethnologist, artist and writer who published her research into the cultures of indigenous tribes in the Americas, including the Navajo of the American Southwest and the Mam of Guatemala. She is best known for her books recording these tribes' ceremonies, art and stories.

== Early life ==
Oakes was born May 25, 1903, in Seattle, younger daughter and last of three children, to Mary Beekman (née Taylor) and Walter Oakes (1864–1911), whose father was Thomas Fletcher Oakes, the president of Northern Pacific Railway from 1888 to 1893. Walter was the co-founder of the Alaska Steamship Company and president of the Roslyn Fuel Company.

As she grew up in Manhattan, her family's prosperity allowed Oakes to travel. She developed an interest in the culture of Native Americans while visiting Washington State and vacationing on Bainbridge Island in Puget Sound. It was that trip that inspired her to pursue her passion for ethnology, focusing on indigenous tribes of the Americas. Her research included renderings of tribal art and, according to a gallery's biography, "Little is known about her art education, though it can be surmised that this came with her grade school education."

=== American southwest ===
In the 1940s, Oakes received a grant from the Old Dominion Foundation (now the Andrew W. Mellon Foundation) to study the rituals of the Dine (Navajo) people, which resulted in her first book, Where the Two Came to Their Father, A Navaho War Ceremonial. In that book, she described the Navajo creation story as well as a ceremony by Navajo singer Jeff King that she witnessed while living on the reservation in 1942–1943.

"The War Ceremonial was revived by 20th century Navajo to sendoff young Navajo leaving the reservation to serve in the US military during WWII. The ceremonial was intended to protect the soul of the warrior who would be so far from his people. Several hundred Navajo served in the war, including approximately 400 Code Talkers".

Oakes also took that opportunity to replicate the sand paintings used during the ceremony. A series of 18 pochoir stencil prints derived from the original sandpaintings were published in 1943.

=== Guatemala ===
On a similar trip, from late 1945 to early 1947, Oakes lived for 17 months in the village of Todos Santos in a remote part of the highlands of Guatemala as the only outsider. She documented the art and spiritual practices of the Mam tribe and their pre-Columbian cultural roots. One of her resulting books, The two crosses of Todos Santos, Oakes described a religious ritual that had survived from Mayan times. In another book, Beyond the Windy Place, Oakes talked about her life in the village.

Her papers were published by Princeton University in the 1940s and '50s and republished as part of a collection in the 1990s.

== Later years ==
Oakes became a student of Carl Jung and made his psychology the subject of her final book, The Stone Speaks, which reflected her personal meditations on a large carved stone located in the garden of Bollingen Tower, the name given to Jung's home on Lake Zürich in Switzerland. Oakes was named an honorary member of the C. G. Jung Institute in San Francisco, and became a close friend of actor and researcher Natacha Rambova when she was studying Egyptian artifacts, and at whose apartment Oakes attended classes "on symbolism, mythology, and comparative religion."

Oakes died in 1990 at her home at Carmel, California, at the age of 87, of Alzheimer's disease. She was survived by a niece and a nephew.

== Selected works ==
- Oakes, Maud. The two crosses of Todos Santos: Survivals of Mayan religious ritual. 1969
- Oakes, Maud. Stone Speaks: The Memoir of a Personal Transformation, Chiron Publishers, 1987
- Henderson, Joseph Lewis, and Maud Oakes. The wisdom of the serpent: The myths of death, rebirth, and resurrection. Vol. 38. Princeton University Press, 1990.
- King, Jeff, Maud Oakes, and Joseph Campbell. Where the two came to their father: a Navaho war ceremonial given by Jeff King. Princeton University Press, 1991. (With commentary by Joseph Campbell)
- Adams, John, Mark Whitney, Michael Whitney, Suzanne Wagner, Jerome Hill, Maud Oakes, John Freeman, and Joan Bakewell. Matter of Heart. New York, NY: Kino International, 2001.
- Oakes, Maud. Beyond The Windy Place -- Life In The Guatemalan Highlands. Read Books Ltd, 2016.
