= Jeff King (Navajo) =

US Army scout (1865–1964)

Jeff King (1865?–1964; known in Navajo as Hashkeh-yilth-e-yah) was a US Army scout from 1891 to 1911, and went on to become a highly respected hataałii (singer, or medicine man).

According to army records, King was born in Rock Springs, New Mexico, in 1865; however, his family's records indicated that he may have been born as early as 1851. He lived for most of his life in Pinedale, New Mexico on the Navajo Reservation.

When the United States joined World War II in 1941 and young Navajos left the reservation to serve in the army, King performed a ritual for them called Where the Two Came to Their Father that tells the story of two young heroes who go to the hogan of their father, the Sun, and return with the power to destroy the monsters that are plaguing their people. The two-day ceremony, which included songs and elaborate sand paintings, was meant to keep the young men's souls healthy as they went off to fight, away from their land and their people.

At the time, an artist and ethnologist named Maud Oakes was living on the reservation. With King's permission, she recorded the ceremony, including the sand-paintings. She published the text and her paintings, with commentary by mythologist Joseph Campbell, as Where the Two Came to Their Father: A Navaho War Ceremonial. It is one of the most complete extant recordings of a Navajo ritual.

King was also known to perform two of the other great Navajo ceremonies: the Hózhǫ́ǫ́jí (Blessing Way) and Anaaʼjí (Enemy Way).

King died and was buried in January 1964. He was the first Navajo buried at Arlington National Cemetery, near Washington, D.C.

== See also ==
- Code talkers
- Diné Bahaneʼ
- Navajo people
- Wind Talkers
