= David Lancy =

American academic

- Born: 1945 (age 80–81)

Academic background
- Education: Yale University (1967: BA); University of Pittsburgh (1975: PhD)
- Writing career
- Occupations: Anthropologist; Professor; Editor
- Language: English
- Website: https://www.davidlancy.org/

David Lancy (born 1945) is an American anthropologist and professor emeritus at Utah State University. He has made original contributions to the comparative study of childhood development and the concept of "chore curriculum." In 2001, he was awarded the Carnegie Foundation's Professor of the Year.

== Education and early career ==
David Lancy was born and raised in Pennsylvania. He received his B.A. in 1967 from Yale University, a master's degree in psychology from University of California, Irvine in 1969, and a Ph.D. in International and Development Education from the University of Pittsburgh in 1975. In 1979, he was an N.I.M.H. fellow at the University of California, Los Angeles.

== Selected publications ==
- — (2024). Learning Without Lessons: Pedagogy in Indigenous Communities. Oxford: Oxford University Press. ASIN B0CQXKC5GD.
- — (2022). The Anthropology of Childhood: Cherubs, Chattel. Changelings. Cambridge: Cambridge University Press. ISBN 978-1107420984.
- — (2020). Raising Children: Surprising Insights from Other Cultures. Cambridge: Cambridge University Press. ISBN 978-1108415095.
- — (2018). Anthropological Perspectives on Children as Helpers, Workers, Artisans, and Laborers. New York: Palgrave-Macmillan. ASIN B077G94ZFT.
- — (2017). Raising Children: Surprising Insights from Other Cultures. Cambridge: Cambridge University Press. ISBN 978-1108415095.
- — (2010). The Anthropology of Learning in Childhood. Lanham: AltaMira Press. ASIN B0044R9HYA.
- — (1996). Playing on the Mother-Ground: Cultural Routines for Children's Development. New York City: Guilford Press. ISBN 978-1572302150.
- — (1993). Qualitative Research in Education: An Introduction to the Major Traditions. New York City: Longman. ASIN B012TQ59R6.
- — (1983). Cross-Cultural Studies in Cognition and Mathematics. New York City: Academic Press. ISBN 0124356206.

== Awards ==
- 1989 Fulbright Fellowship, Trinidad & Tobago
- 1995 Fulbright Fellowship, Sweden
- 2001 Professor of the Year, Carnegie Foundation
- 2011 D.W. Thorne Career Research Award, Utah State University
