= Four Sacred Mountains of the Navajo =

Four mountains sacred to the Navajo

The Four Sacred Mountains of the Navajo are the four mountains along the boundaries of the Navajo Nation. According to Navajo belief, each mountain is assigned a color and direction and is seen as a deity that provides essential resources for Navajo livelihood. However, the environmental integrity of these sacred mountains has been compromised for decades, by uranium mining and other resource extraction procedures leading to unfavorable consequences for the Navajo community.

== Geographical location ==
The Navajo attribute supernatural power to geographic features, especially mountains, which they consider to be deities. The four sacred mountains in the cardinal directions of Navajo Country hold great importance. They are named in sunwise order and associated with the colors of the four cardinal directions: Sisnaajiní or Blanca Peak (white in the east), Tsoodził or Mt. Taylor (blue in the south), Doko’oosłííd or the San Francisco Peaks (yellow in the west), and Dibéntsaa or Hesperus Peak (black in the north). These mountains are located in south-central Colorado; Grants, New Mexico; Flagstaff, Arizona; and La Plata Mountains, Colorado in relation to U.S. boundaries.

== Recent controversies ==
=== Mt. Taylor uranium mining ===
In 1971, Gulf Mineral Resources Corporation purchased property on Mount Taylor. Gulf began mining uranium ore in 1980, a radioactive mineral. Above ground mining took place as well as extensive drill-and-blast operations that used large quantities of ground water in the operations. The New Mexico Environmental Department reports that Gulf "dewatered three aquifers through a series of groundwater withdrawal wells installed in the 1970s." Later Gulf engaged in a corporate merger with Chevron Resources Company to extract 675,000 tons of uranium ore which left behind 698,000 tons of radioactive tailings on the surface. The Mount Taylor area has several Superfund Sites and is considered one of the most highly polluted sites in the U.S. to do radioactive contamination from uranium mining.

=== Blanca Peak mining and development ===
In the 1890s, gold and silver mining commenced on Blanca Peak.

== Gallery ==
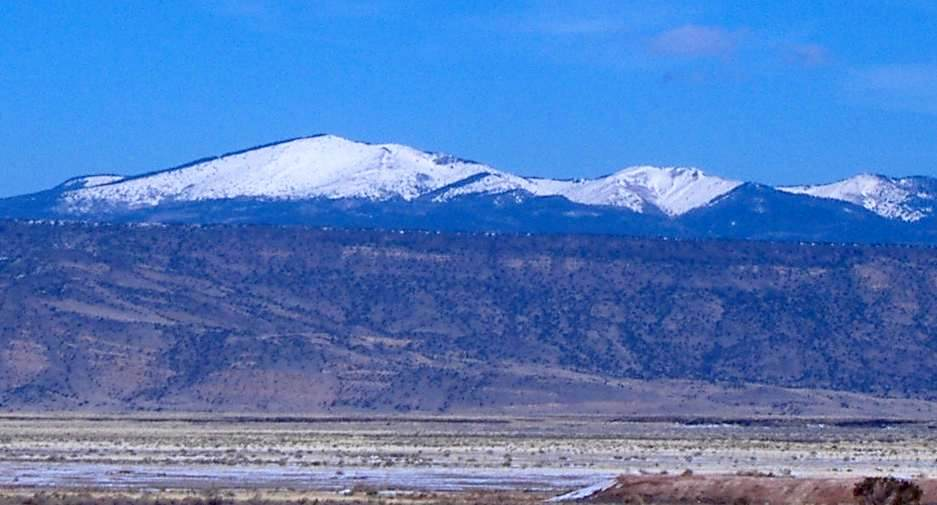
Mount Taylor

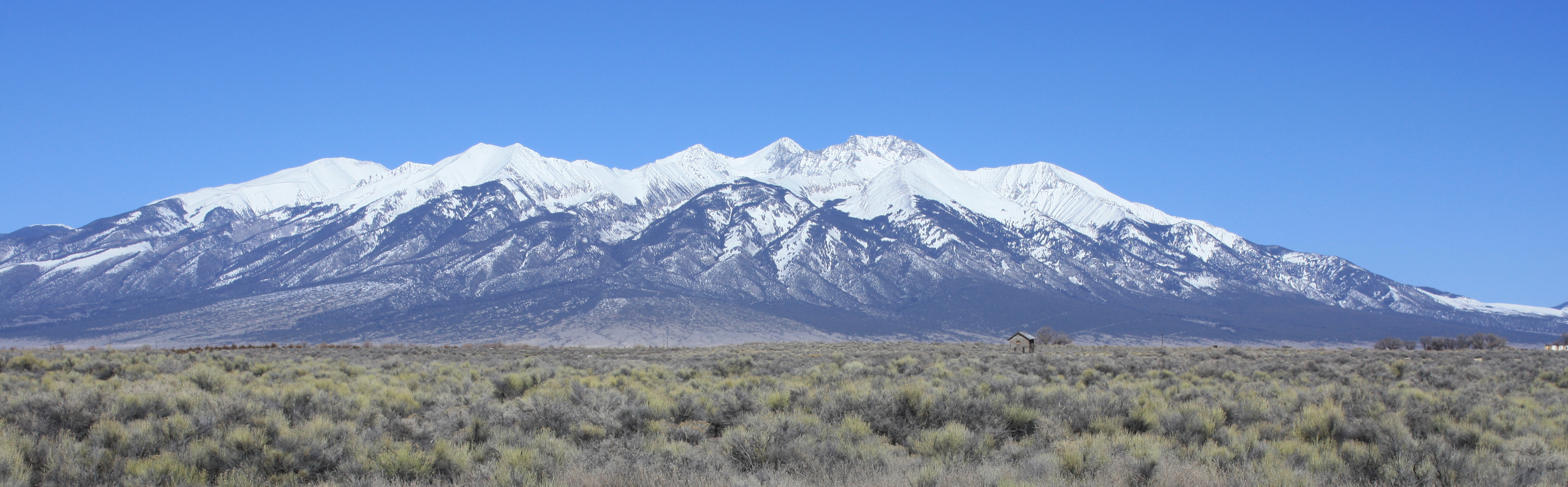
Blanca Peak group

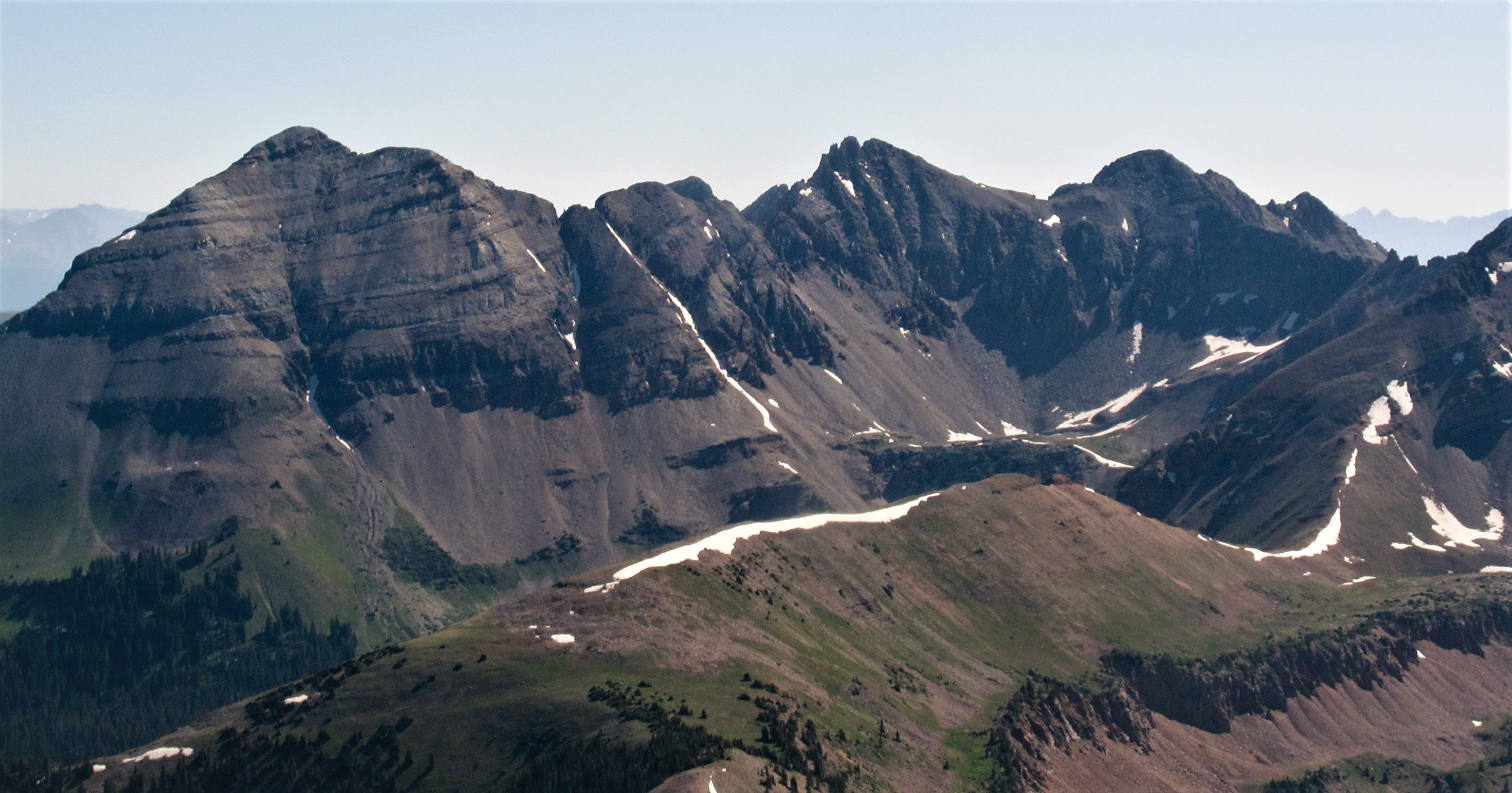
Hesperus Peak

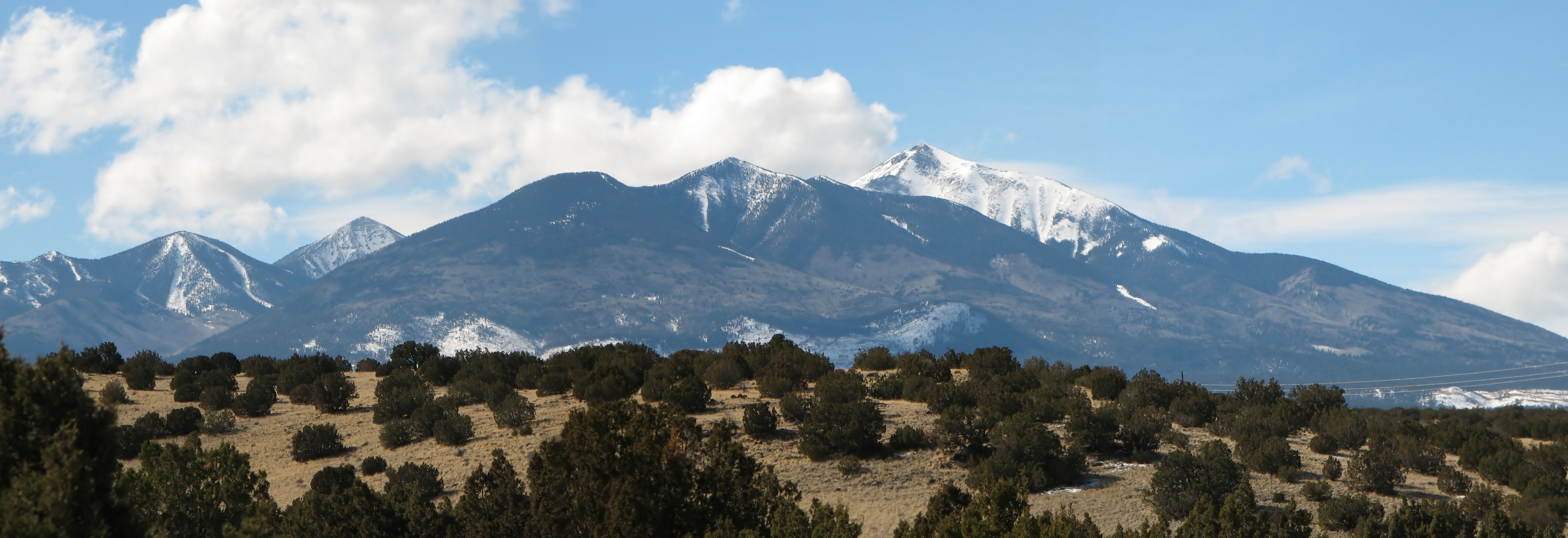
San Francisco Peaks
