= Navajo song ceremonial complex =

Navajo spiritual practice

The Navajo song ceremonial complex is a spiritual practice used by certain Navajo ceremonial people to restore and maintain balance and harmony in the lives of the people. One half of the ceremonial complex is the Blessing Way, while the other half is the Enemy Way (Anaʼí Ndááʼ).

== The Blessing Way ==
The rites and prayers in the Blessing Way are concerned with healing, creation, harmony and peace. The song cycles recount the elaborate Navajo creation story (Diné Bahaneʼ).

One of the most important Blessing Way rites is the Kinaaldá ceremony, in which a young girl makes the transition to womanhood upon her menarche. During the course of the ceremony, the girl enacts the part of Changing Woman (Asdzą́ą́ Nádleehé), the powerful spirit woman responsible for fertility entering the world. The Kinaaldá ceremony includes the girl demonstrating endurance by ritualised running, each dawn over a period of several days, as well as a hair-combing ritual and the baking of a large corn cake.

=== Overview of Kinaaldá ceremony ===
The Navajo people see a young girl's first menstruation as a time of joy and happiness. It is also the start of becoming a woman. It is imperative that this ceremony be done correctly because it sets the tone for the rest of her life. It is also important that the ceremony involves family and community. The purpose of the Kinaaldá ceremony is to ensure that the child transitioning into womanhood will be prepared to take on the social roles and expectations of a Navajo woman, not only in strength and endurance, but also with generous and kind tendencies. This ceremony lasts for four nights and five days and occurs as close as possible to when a child experiences her first menstruation. During this ceremony, the initiate will have an adult female mentor, known as the Ideal Woman, who is a prime example of someone who follows the Navajo ceremonies and also resembles characteristics of the Changing Woman. This ceremony involves five steps: molding into Changing Woman, running, hair washing, painting, and the making of the corn cake.

==== Molding into Changing Woman ====
Changing Woman is a Navajo deity who embodies all of the ideals of a Navajo woman. The girl partaking in the ceremony is molded by her mentor, the Ideal Woman, who is chosen by the family and represents the qualities of Changing Woman and an ideal Navajo woman. Ideal woman molds the initiate so that she can represent Changing Woman and all of her ideal qualities. During the Kinaaldá ceremony, the initiate's body is thought to be as soft as it was at birth, so it is able to be easily manipulated and molded. The child lies on a blanket or sheepskin while her sponsor massages her body, molding it so it can possess not only the physical qualities of Changing Woman, but the psychological qualities as well. This is important because Changing Woman is regarded as the supreme mother who possesses ideal characteristics such as kindness and being nurturing, and also ideal physical characteristics such as good posture, strength, and physical beauty.

==== Running ====
The initiate must run two to three times a day for each day of the ceremony to prepare her for a challenging life and to make her stronger. She must complete these daily runs towards the east at dawn, noon, and sunset. The purpose of the runs is to make her more powerful, energetic, and diligent, and to help improve her lifespan. The arduous runs are also meant to prepare the initiate for the hardships of life.

==== Hair-washing ====
During this portion of the ceremony, the girl's hair is washed with a yucca plant and ceremonial Navajo basket. The initiate's jewelry is also washed during this process. Both the hair-washing and jewelry-washing constitute purification procedures. Her mother is given the rinse water to pour out near their home so that the initiate will always be connected to where she came from.

==== Face-painting ====
The initiate is painted with white clay, or ashes from the bark of an aspen tree, by Ideal Woman so her height can be increased and she can have minimal signs of aging. Her cheeks and forehead are painted in hopes for smooth and wrinkle-free skin. Surrounding members taking part in the ceremony may also be painted to bring them blessings.

==== Making of the corn cake ====
One of the most important tasks during the Kinaaldá ceremony is the making of the corn cake, which represents Changing Woman, fertility, and life. Corn is ground to prepare for the baking of the corn cake which is baked during the fourth night of the ceremony. This cake is regarded as an offering to the sun, and four pinches of the cake are buried as an offering to the earth. Grinding the corn and mixing the corn cake symbolize the girl's endurance, motivation, and potential positive effects. While the initiate herself is not allowed to eat the cake because it represents her fertility, she serves it to those in attendance of the ceremony to show thanks and generosity.

== The Enemy Way ==
The Enemy Way (Anaʼí Ndááʼ) is a traditional ceremony for countering the harmful effects of ghosts (chʼį́įdii), and has been performed for returning military personnel. More generally, "the formal intention of the Enemy Way is to lay the ghost of an outsider: that of a white man or of some other non-Navaho such as a European, and Asiatic, or a member of some other Indian tribe". A form of treatment called blackening or the blackening rite is performed to determine if the Enemy Way ceremony will be successful in treating the patient. As a result of blackening, the patient embodies the Monster Slayer. The Enemy Way ceremony is carried out if the patient shows improvement after blackening.

The Enemy Way ceremony involves song, sandpainting, dance, and the powerful mythical figure Monster Slayer. The ceremony lasts for several days and includes the enacting of a battle.

Associated with the Enemy Way is a Girl's Dance, to which young men are invited by marriageable young women. This derives from an aspect of the Monster Slayer myth, in which two captive girls are liberated.

== See also ==
- Jeff King (Navajo)
- Rite of passage
