= Navajo ethnobotany =

Plants utilized in Navajo culture

See also Zuni ethnobotany, and Native American ethnobotany.

This is a list of plants utilized in Navajo culture.

== A ==
- Abronia fragrans (snowball-sand verbena), used medicinally for boils and taken internally when a spider was swallowed. The Kayenta Navajo use it as a cathartic, for insect bites, as a sudorific, as an emetic, for stomach cramps, and as a general panacea. The Ramah Navajo use it as a lotion for sores or sore mouth and to bathe perspiring feet.
- Acer glabrum var. glabrum (Rocky Mountain maple), an infusion of which is used by the Ramah Navajo for swellings, and also as a "life medicine", or panacea.
- Acer negundo (box elder), the wood of which is used to make tubes for bellows.
- Achillea millefolium (western yarrow), occidentalis variety used as a wash for cuts and saddle sores, and used as a "life medicine" for impaired vitality. Also used as a tonic. The Kayenta Navajo use it for headaches caused by weak or sore eyes, and as a lotion around eyes that are sore from wearing ceremonial masks. They also use it as a febrifuge. Ramah Navajo use it as a ceremonial emetic.
- Acourtia wrightii (brownfoot), used by the Kayenta Navajo for difficult labor and as a postpartum medicine.
- Adiantum capillus-veneris (southern maidenhair fern), an infusion of which is used by the Kayenta Navajo as a lotion for bumblebee and centipede stings. They also use an infusion to treat insanity, and smoke the plant for the same purpose.
- Agastache pallidiflora (New Mexico giant hyssop), used by the Ramah as a ceremonial chant lotion, for bad coughs, and the dried, pulverized root used as dusting powder for sores or cankers. The Ramah also use it a fumigant for "deer infection", as a febrifuge, and to protect from witches.
- Agave, the baked fibers of which are squeezed, and the liquid drunk. The heads are baked or boiled, pounded into flat sheets, sun dried and stored for future use. The baked, dried heads are also boiled and made into an edible paste, eaten whole, or made into soup. The leaves are also boiled and eaten. The young, tender flowering stalks are and shoots are roasted and eaten as well. The fibers are used to make rope, the leaves are used to line baking pits, and the sharp pointed leaf tips are used to make basketry awls.
- Agave utahensis (Utah agave), the fibers of which are used to make blankets.
- Ageratina herbacea (fragrant snakeroot), cold infusion taken and used as a lotion for headache and fever by the Ramah Navajo.
- Agoseris aurantiaca (orange agoseris), taken by the Ramah as a ceremonial emetic. A cold infusion is taken and used as lotion for arrow or bullet wounds, for "deer infection", and for protection against witches. Wet leaves rubbed on swollen arms, wrists or ankles. The root is used a life medicine.
- Allionia incarnata, a cold infusion of which is used by the Ramah as a lotion for swellings.
- Androsace septentrionalis, (pygmyflower rockjasmine), used by the Kayenta for the bewitchment and pain from witches' arrows.
- Antennaria, used in ceremonies for protection from witchcraft.
- Artemisia tridentata, vaporized to treat headaches. It is also used for colds, as a febrifuge, and in religious and medicinal ceremonies. A decoction is used for stomachaches, and an infusion is taken by women to help with childbirth. The plant is also taken before long hikes to rid the body of lingering, undesirable things. The Kayenta Navajo use it as a laxative, and an infusion of the plant is taken and used as a lotion for snakebites. The Ramah Navajo use a decoction of the leaves for postpartum pain, and for "big cough". They also apply a poultice of the wet leaves to swellings, use it diaphoretic in sweatbaths, and apply a cold infusion of the leaves as a lotion for cuts on sheep.

== B ==
- Baccharis salicifolia (mulefat), used by the Kayenta in a compound infusion of plants used as a lotion for chills from immersion.

== C ==
- Carex, seeds ground into mush and eaten by the Navajo of Kayenta, Arizona.
- Ceanothus fendleri, combined with Frasera to make a medicine applied internally or externally, for "alarm and nervousness".
- Commelina dianthifolia, given a cold simple or compound infusion by the Ramah Navajo to livestock as an aphrodisiac.
- Cordylanthus ramosus, an infusion of which is used as an emetic. This infusion is also used to treat syphilis, used by menstruating women to stop menses, and by men to stop nosebleeds. The plant is also used to prevent broken ribs.

== D ==
- Dalea candida, candida variety (white prairieflower), used by the Ramah for stomachache, for "life medicine", especially for fever, and a compound decoction used to treat "snake infection" in sheep.
- Draba reptans – The Ramah Navajo apply a poultice of the crushed leaves of the plant to sores.

== E ==
- Euphorbia revoluta, used as a lotion by the Kayenta for chafing and sores.

== F ==
- Fendlera rupicola, an infusion of the inner bark is used as a remedy when were swallowed. Also used to kill head lice. and as a cathartic. This plant is also used in plumeway, nightway, male shootingway and windway ceremonies, and the wood is used to make arrow shafts.
- Frasera, combined with Ceanothus fendleri to make a medicine applied internally or externally, for "alarm and nervousness".

== G ==
- Gutierrezia microcephala, a poultice of which is applied to the back and legs of horses.

== I ==
- Iris missouriensis; a decoction of which is used as an emetic.

== J ==
- Juniperus communis, used as an herbal remedy for diabetes among the Navajo.

== L ==
- Lithospermum ruderale, used as a contraceptive. Studies on mice showed that the plant reduced their fertility.
- Lycium pallidum, used for toothache and for chicken pox.
- Lophophora williamsii, used as a sacrament in the Native American Church.

== P ==
- Packera multilobata, used medicinally.
- Pericome caudata, used for a variety of ceremonial and medicinal uses.
- Picea pungens, used medicinally and ceremonially.
- Pinus flexilis is used to create bow and arrows for ceremonial use.
- Prunus americana, used to make a red dye.
- Psilostrophe tagetina, used by Ramah Navajo to create a strong infusion as cathartic, also used to treat stomachache, as an eyewash, as a lotion for itching, or in cold infusion gargled or in poultice of leaves applied for sore throat.

== T ==
- Thelesperma megapotamicum used to make a yellow dye, and as medicinal tisane. and in their plumeway, nightway, male shootingway and windway ceremonies, and to make arrow shafts. It is also used to make notched and smooth sticks which are rubbed together in their mountain chant ceremony, and to make weaving forks, planting sticks, and knitting needles. They also boil the plant with juniper berries, pinon buds, and cornmeal for ceremonial consumption.

== V ==
- Viola nephrophylla, used by the Ramah Navajo as a ceremonial emetic.

== Z ==
- Zinnia grandiflora, used for medicinal purposes.

== See also ==
- Native American ethnobotany
- Navajo medicine
- Zuni ethnobotany
