= Christmas Tree Ruin =

Archaeological site in New Mexico, U.S.

- Christmas Tree Ruin (LA 11097)
- U.S. National Register of Historic Places
- NM State Register of Cultural Properties
- Nearest city: Farmington, New Mexico
- Area: 0.5 acres (0.20 ha)
- MPS: Navajo--Refugee Pueblo TR
- NRHP reference No.: 86003646
- NMSRCP No.: 361

Significant dates
- Added to NRHP: January 21, 1987
- Designated NMSRCP: February 20, 1975

The Christmas Tree Ruin is an archaeological site containing a Navajo pueblito, a defensive structure built in a high cliff wall approximately 200 feet (60 m) above the floor of Gobernador Canyon in northwestern New Mexico, United States. The ruin, which is believed to have been built by the Navajo, dates to the 18th century, and was probably used for defensive, storage, and habitation purposes.

The site is situated on a ledge and within a rock shelter. The ruin consists of a walled rock shelter and a burned rock pile. The walled area is accessible only by ladder.

== See also ==
- Adolfo Canyon Site (LA 5665)
- Dinétah
- Navajo pueblitos
- National Register of Historic Places listings in San Juan County, New Mexico
