= Timeline of dendrochronology timestamp events =

A timeline of dendrochronology timestamped events.

== Timelines ==
=== Timeline from all sub-regions ===
3807 BCE, 3806 BCE	The Sweet Track, ancient timber roadway of England (oldest engineered road yet discovered)
3374 BCE	Tree-ring dating of find site layer at Arslantepe-Malatya; the cylinder seal unearthed contains an image of a threshing-board or sledge
2049 BCE	Seahenge constructed in Britain
2300 to 1950 BCE, 1950 to 1700 BCE	A1, and A2 date periods for the Unetice culture, early Bronze Age culture, Europe
c. 1300 BCE	firewood dating; see Oxhide ingot from the Uluburun shipwreck, south coast of Turkey
148 BCE, 147 BCE	Corlea Trackway, Republic of Ireland; used for industrial harvesting of peat for energy generation
95 BCE	Navan Fort Northern Ireland; felling of the oak tree used as central post of a large structure built with over two hundred posts.
0	Timestamp of BCE, or BP to positive years, CE
290	Anderitum a Saxon Shore Fort
begins 535, multiple years	The volcanic winter of 536
619	Tide mill of Nendrum Monastery (oldest known tide mill)
737 to 968	3 phases of construction between 737 and 968, Danevirke peninsular fortification (east–west)
753	Staraya Ladoga, the prosperous trading village in Finland at the start of the Age of the Vikings
890	The Gokstad ship found in a burial mound, a ship burial
932 to 966	fishing at Bridgwater Bay, Bristol Channel, England; 'mudhorse fishing', with structures built in the bay at Stert Flats
963	(from ~800 onward)-pavement dates of 963, in the medieval fortified settlement Sarskoye Gorodishche on the Volga trade route
980, 981	Viking ring fortress; Trelleborg
988–1030 (999–1036+) (1036 dated)	Novgorod Codex
~1042 and 11th century	See Skuldelev ships; Skuldelev 2 dated to 1042, found at Skuldelev, 20 km north of Roskilde, Denmark, built of oak from near Dublin
1088 to 1100	Salmon Ruins in New Mexico, USA; 150-room structure
1175	church of Ludwigsdorf, Lüdwigsdorf (Görlitz, Germany)
1190	first dating of wood from the megastructure cliff-dwelling, Cliff Palace; 1190 to various dates; major construction, first 20 years
1280s–1350	The Sierra Ancha (Broad Mountains) cliff dwellings, Arizona
ending at 1291	multiple constructions prior to 1291, the Stokesay Castle
1341 to 1352	Aston Eyre Hall; (an additional barn dated to 1613)
1346	Güssenburg Castle
starting at: 1347	Black Death migration; first shipwrecks etc.-(total crew death), with start of disease; a major hiatus begins of construction in cities–(a gap in the tree-ring dated wood pieces)
1391, 1392	Gatehouse at Church of Mavesyn Ridware
1434	Trondenes church, Norway, a stone, stave church
1450 to 1540	Spörer Minimum
1465, 1466	Newport ship
1535	See: The Sun Dog Painting-(reproduction) of 1636
~1600, =400 BP	Kostal Cone, British Columbia, Canada: (newest cinder cone)
1636	(dated 1636 wooden frame of copy): a copy of the original: The Sun Dog Painting by Urban målare (Malare the Painter); the sun dogs in the paintings are from the oldest views of the city of Stockholm, Sweden; the Sun Dog atmospheric events of 20 April 1535
1643	Budesti Josani church
1645 to 1715	Maunder Minimum
1699	dating of the red cedar forests that were lowered into tidal zones by the 1700 Cascadia earthquake, finalizing their winter growth rings
1722 to 1749	Old Fort Ruin, in New Mexico, USA
1733 to 1751	Adolfo Canyon Site (LA 5665), pueblito and hogan site, New Mexico, USA
19 May 1780	See New England's Dark Day, (from an Ontario, Canada forest fire)
1790 to 1820	Dalton Minimum
1828	The Walker Cabin, of Marble Springs historic site in Tennessee

=== Cliff dwellings, etc, the Americas ===
1088 to 1100	Salmon Ruins in New Mexico, USA; 150-room structure
1190	first dating of wood from the megastructure cliff dwelling, Cliff Palace; 1190 to various dates; major construction, first 20 years
1280s–1350	The Sierra Ancha-(Broad Mountains) cliff dwellings, Arizona
1722 to 1749	Old Fort Ruin, in New Mexico, USA
1733 to 1751	Adolfo Canyon Site (LA 5665), pueblito and hogan site, New Mexico, USA

- for the Americas, see also: Timeline of Chacoan history
