= Old Fort Ruin =

- Old Fort (LA 1869)
- U.S. National Register of Historic Places
- Nearest city: Tierra Amarilla, New Mexico
- MPS: Navajo--Refugee Pueblo TR
- NRHP reference No.: 86003614
- Added to NRHP: January 21, 1987

Old Fort Ruin is an archaeological site located in Rio Arriba County, northwestern New Mexico, United States, on lands owned by the State of New Mexico. The site consists of the ruins of a Navajo pueblito and associated hogans and artifacts. The site is included on the National Register of Historic Places in New Mexico.

== Site description ==
Old Fort is located on the edge of a mesa overlooking a deep canyon in the cultural area known as the Dinétah, the traditional homeland of the Navajo people.

The site contains the remains of eight forked-stick hogans and 12 ground floor rooms, all of which are enclosed by a stone wall. The wall stands nearly 2 meters in height. Access to the interior compound was gained via two covered entry passages which lead north onto a bench of the cliff below the site.

== Excavations ==
Archaeological investigations at the site produced a metate, manos, arrow shaft smoothers, an iron axe, a variety of ceramic sherds, and bones from sheep, horses, dogs, and mule deer also snipe. The ceramics were mainly of the local Dinetah Gray and Gobernador Polychrome types, along with trade wares from the Rio Grande Pueblo region including Ashiwi, Puname, Tewa, Payupki, and Hawikuh polychrome specimens.

Dendrochronological samples from the site indicate dates ranging from 1722 to 1749 C.E.
