= Crow Canyon =

Crow Canyon may refer to:

- Crow Canyon Archaeological Center, a teaching and research center located in southwestern Colorado, USA.
- Crow Canyon Archaeological District, a historic site in Rio Arriba County, New Mexico.
