= Navajo pueblitos =

Class of archaeological sites

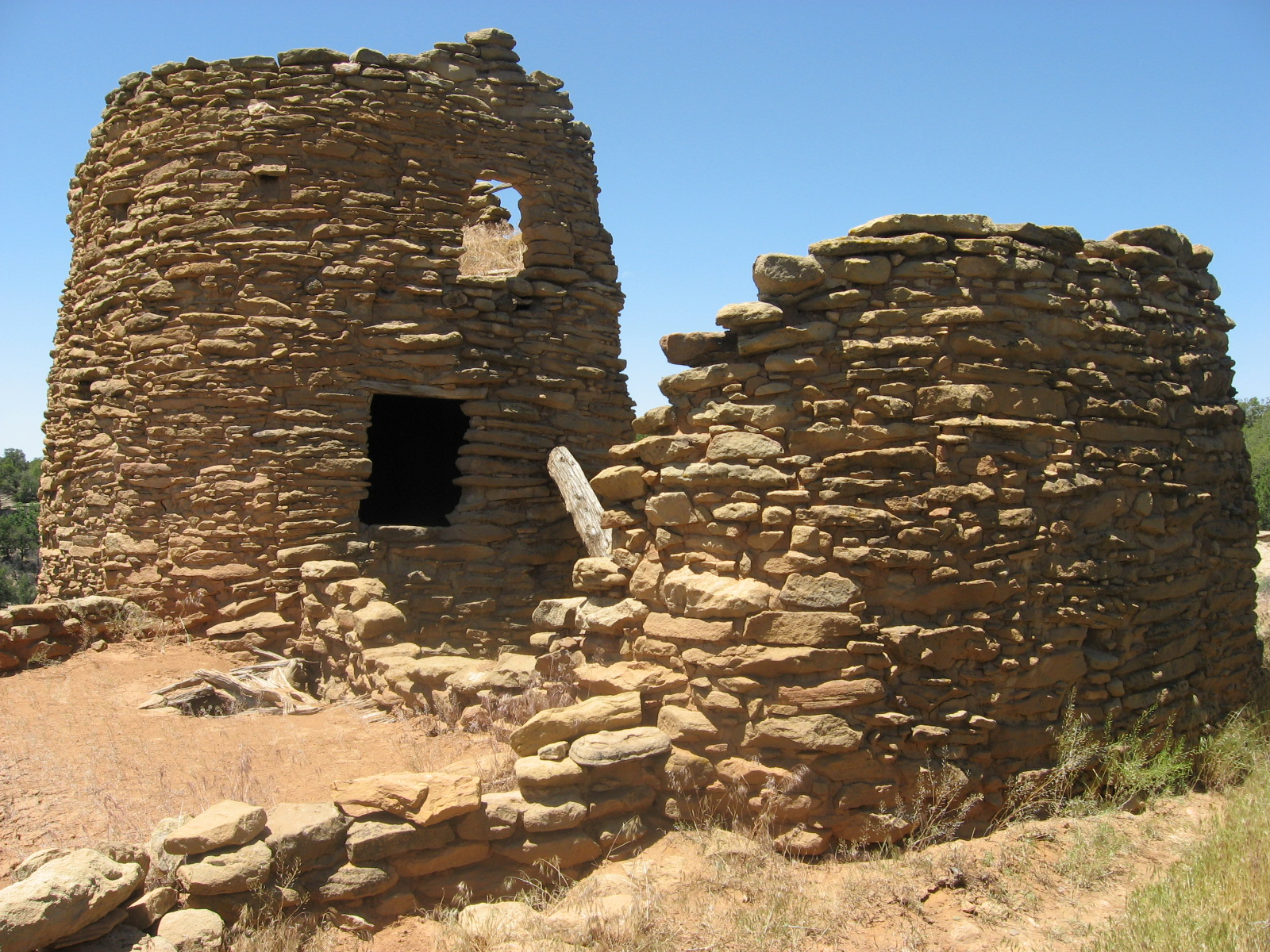
Frances Canyon Pueblito, New Mexico.

The term Navajo Pueblitos, also known as Dinétah Pueblitos, refers to a class of archaeological sites that are found in the northwestern corner of the American state of New Mexico. The sites generally consist of relatively small stone and timber structures which are believed to have been built by the Navajo people in the late 17th and early 18th centuries.

The sites are located within the cultural area known as the Dinétah, the traditional homeland of the Navajo tribe of Native Americans. Pueblitos [pweβˈlitos] (Spanish for "little villages"; cf. Pueblo Native Americans) are generally found in defensible locations along mesa rims and on isolated outcrops and boulders. The structures themselves can consist of from one to six rooms, and take the form of multi-storied towers, cliff dwellings, and fort-like enclosures.

== Setting ==
The majority of pueblito sites are located on lands administered by the United States Bureau of Land Management in Rio Arriba and San Juan counties, New Mexico. Pueblitos, as well as a large number of other early Navajo sites are clustered in the Largo and Gobernador canyons, which drain in a north and westerly direction to the San Juan River.

== Pueblo influence ==
The sites, now in ruins, date to what archaeologists have named the Gobernador phase of Navajo history. This was a period of population movements which began with the Pueblo Revolt of 1680, during which the Spanish were driven from New Mexico by an alliance of various Rio Grande and Western Pueblo tribes. The Spaniards returned in 1692, and it appears that some Pueblo people fled to the mesas and canyons of the Navajo.

A large Puebloan influx to the Dinétah region was long seen by archaeologists as the impetus for a mixing of Puebloan and Navajo cultural traits which appears to have taken place in the 18th century. The presence of Pueblo refugees has also been generally credited as an important driving force behind the construction of the pueblitos.

There is, however, some debate over the evidence that any large number of Pueblo people lived with the Navajos in this period. Spanish reports seem to indicate that portions of several Tewa and two Jemez communities may have sought refuge with the Navajos. However, historical evidence from the Hopi Pueblos indicates that the majority of the refugees from the Rio Grande region went to Hopi, leading some scholars to believe that the number of Puebloans that fled to Navajo country may have been as little as a few hundred.

== Defensive nature ==
Whether constructed by Navajos, Puebloans, or a combination of both, most scholars agree that the Pueblitos are highly defensive in nature. Dinétah was a frontier area at the beginning of the 18th century, held by Navajos and possibly Pueblo refugees against retaliatory Spanish expeditions and Ute-Comanche raids. The defensive strategies employed at Pueblito sites consist of two general elements; advance warning, and regulation of access. The location of sites allowed for good views of approach routes, and sites were often situated so that they could be visually linked.

== Architecture ==
Pueblitos are generally constructed as two-story masonry structures situated on rock outcroppings or cliff edges. The shape of the structures generally follows the contour of the outcrop on which it rests. The interior space is partitioned by abutting cross walls to the outer walls. In most cases the structures and rooms tend to have rounded corners. The masonry is usually of readily available unshaped sandstone blocks and slabs which are set in mud mortar.

Room interiors are often covered with hand pressed adobe mortar. Room ceilings are supported by piñon [piˈɲon] and juniper logs (vigas). Above the primary beams, slats of juniper and piñon are placed laterally latillas [laˈtiʎas]. Adobe is sometimes placed atop the latillas to form a floor. Spanish style hooded fireplaces are found in some sites. Many pueblitos are in good condition and walls often stand from 4 to 15 feet in height.

Forked-stick hogans occur throughout the Dinétah region, as well as in association with pueblitos. The hogans usually have a framework of three main posts that form a tripod. Split juniper slats are placed on the framework to form a cone. The juniper slats were originally covered with a layer of mud mortar, but this layer has since washed away from the structures of this period.

== Important sites ==
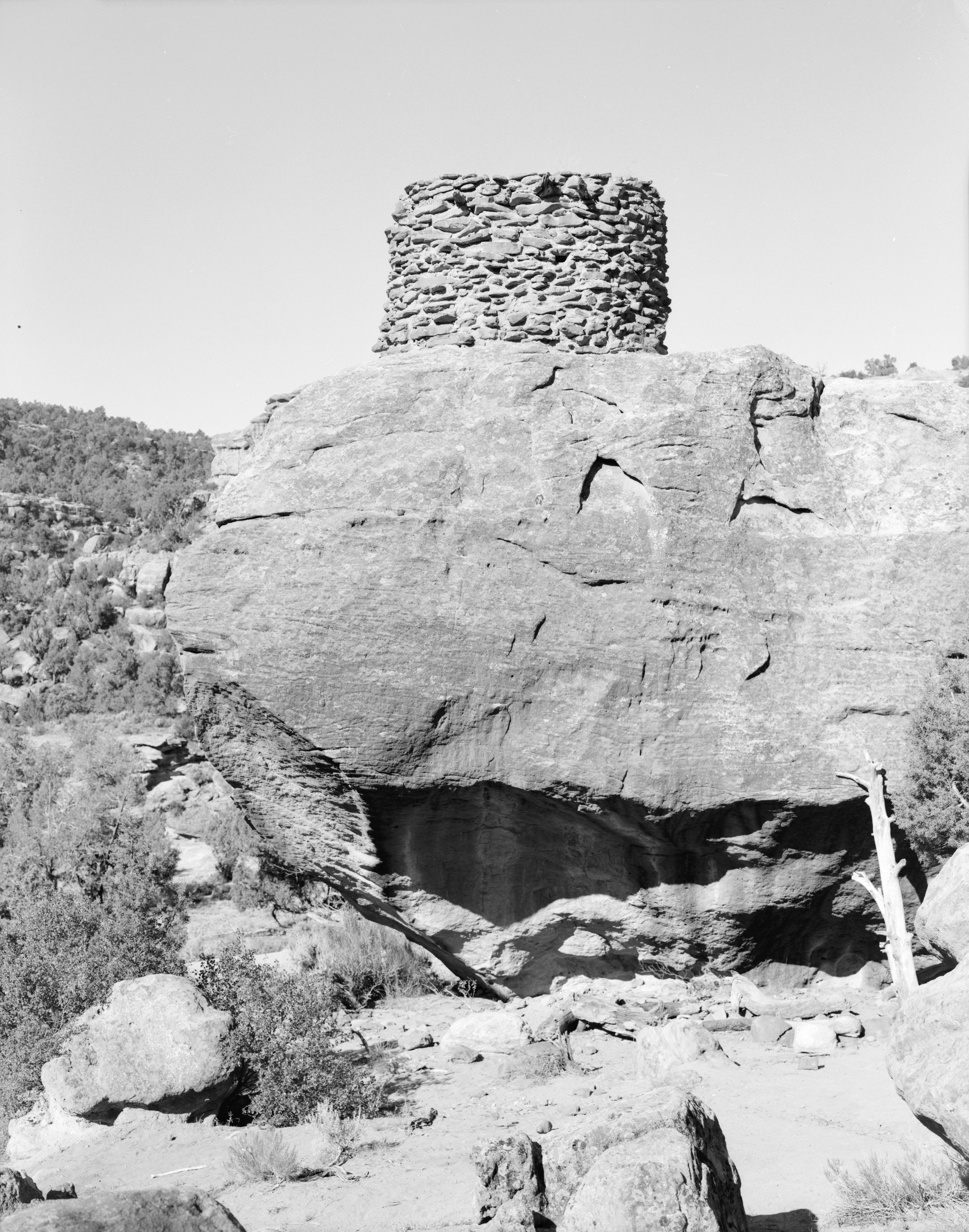
Simon Canyon Pueblito, photo from Historic American Buildings Survey

Some of the larger and better documented pueblito sites include the following:

- Adolpho Canyon
- Christmas Tree Ruin
- Crow Canyon Archaeological District
- Frances Canyon Ruin
- Hooded Fireplace Site
- Largo School Ruin
- Old Fort Ruin
- Shaft House Ruin
- Simon Canyon Ruin
- Split Rock Ruin
- Tapacito Ruin
- Three Corn Ruin

== See also ==
- List of dwellings of Pueblo peoples
