= Adolfo Canyon Site =

Archaeological site in New Mexico, U.S.

- Adolf Canyon Site (LA 5665)
- U.S. National Register of Historic Places
- NM State Register of Cultural Properties
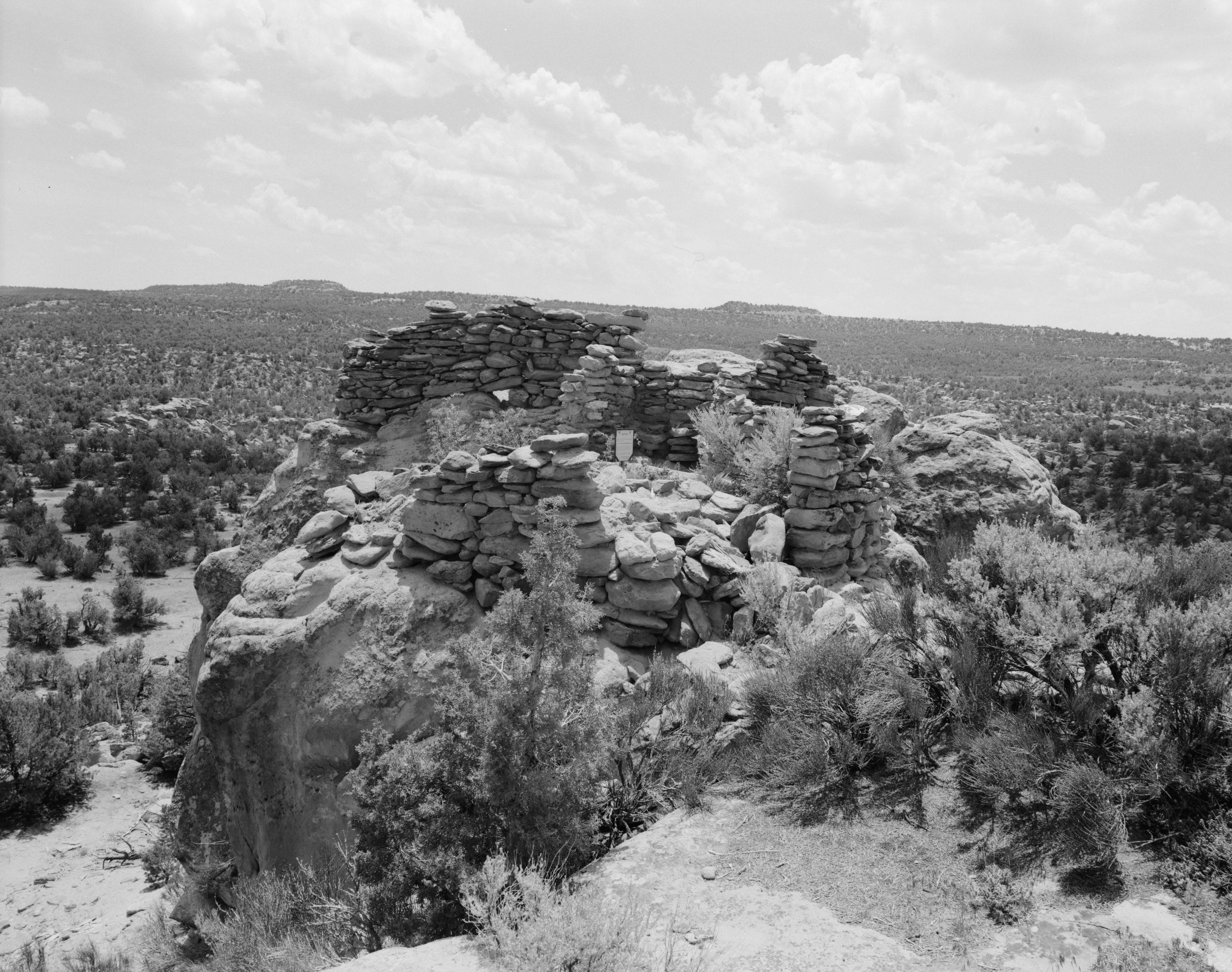
- Southwestern side of the pueblito
- Nearest city: Tierra Amarilla, New Mexico
- Area: 2.6 acres (1.1 ha)
- MPS: Navajo--Refugee Pueblo TR
- NRHP reference No.: 86003605
- NMSRCP No.: 1341

Significant dates
- Added to NRHP: January 21, 1987
- Designated NMSRCP: October 24, 1986

The Adolfo Canyon Site (LA 5665) is an archaeological site containing a Navajo pueblito located in Rio Arriba County, New Mexico, United States. The site is situated on a rock outcrop overlooking Adolfo Canyon. The site consists of a three-room, single story pueblito, and extensive midden area, and six forked stick hogans on the crest of a ridge.

== Excavation findings ==
Portions of the pueblito, hogans, and trash area have been excavated. Dinetah Gray and Gobernador Polychrome ceramic sherds were recovered during the excavations. One sherd of Puname Polychrome from the Keresan pueblos was also found. No European trade goods were found during the excavation.

Tree-ring dates obtained from the hogans range from 1733vv to 1751v.

== See also ==
- National Register of Historic Places listings in Rio Arriba County, New Mexico
