= Moki steps =

Recurring feature in American southwest

Moki steps, sometimes spelled alternately as Moqui steps, are a recurring feature found in areas of the American southwest previously inhabited by the Ancestral Puebloans and other related cultures. The steps consist of alternating hand and toe holds carved into vertical or near-vertical sandstone surfaces. The steps are usually two to three inches deep, and three to four inches in width and height.

== Location and use ==
Moki steps are often found near cliff-dwellings and water sources. They may have allowed relatively quick access to difficult-to-reach areas such as slot canyons, look-out positions, and granaries. In some cases, Moki steps are thought to have provided access to fertile canyon bottoms from more defensible dwellings on or above surrounding cliffs. The steps may have been used in conjunction with handmade ropes. Similar sets of depressions may have been carved by non-indigenous settlers or explorers. In other cases, recent visitors may have deepened or widened a previously existing set of Moki steps. There are no published criteria for determining the origin of a given set of steps.

== See also ==
- Water glyphs
