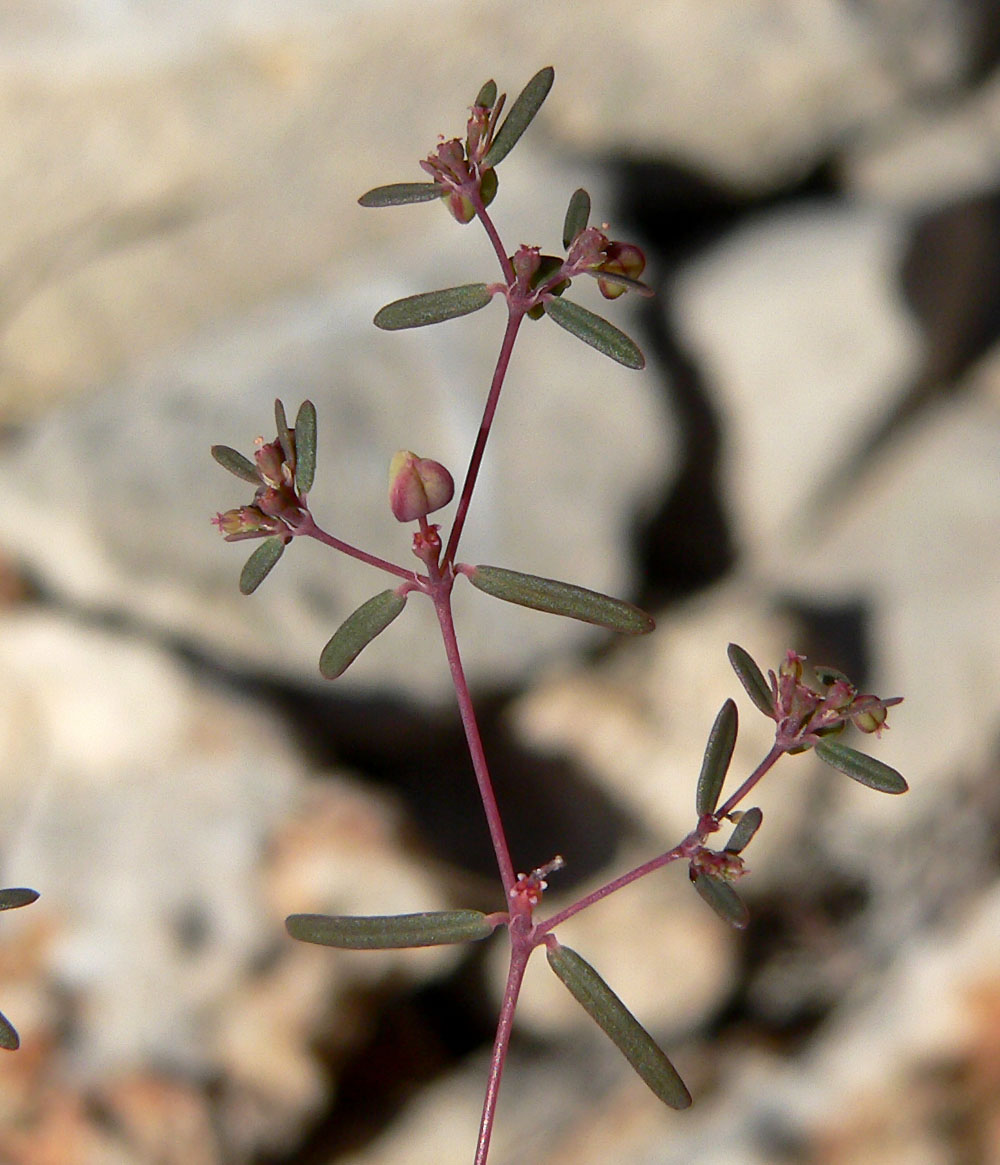

Conservation status
- Secure (NatureServe)

Scientific classification
- Kingdom: Plantae
- Clade: Tracheophytes
- Clade: Angiosperms
- Clade: Eudicots
- Clade: Rosids
- Order: Malpighiales
- Family: Euphorbiaceae
- Genus: Euphorbia
- Species: E. revoluta

Binomial name
- Euphorbia revoluta Engelm.

Synonyms
- Chamaesyce revoluta

= Euphorbia revoluta =

Species of flowering plant

Euphorbia revoluta is a species of euphorb known by the common name threadstem sandmat. It is native to Mexico and the southwestern United States from California to the Rocky Mountains. It is an annual herb producing thin, erect stems with pairs of linear leaves, each leaf up to 2.6 centimeters long. The inflorescence is a cyathium with rounded nectar glands surrounding one female flower and several male flowers. There are sometimes white petal-like appendages as well. The Navajo used this plant as a skin lotion.
