= Frances Canyon Ruin =

- U.S. National Register of Historic Places
- NM State Register of Cultural Properties
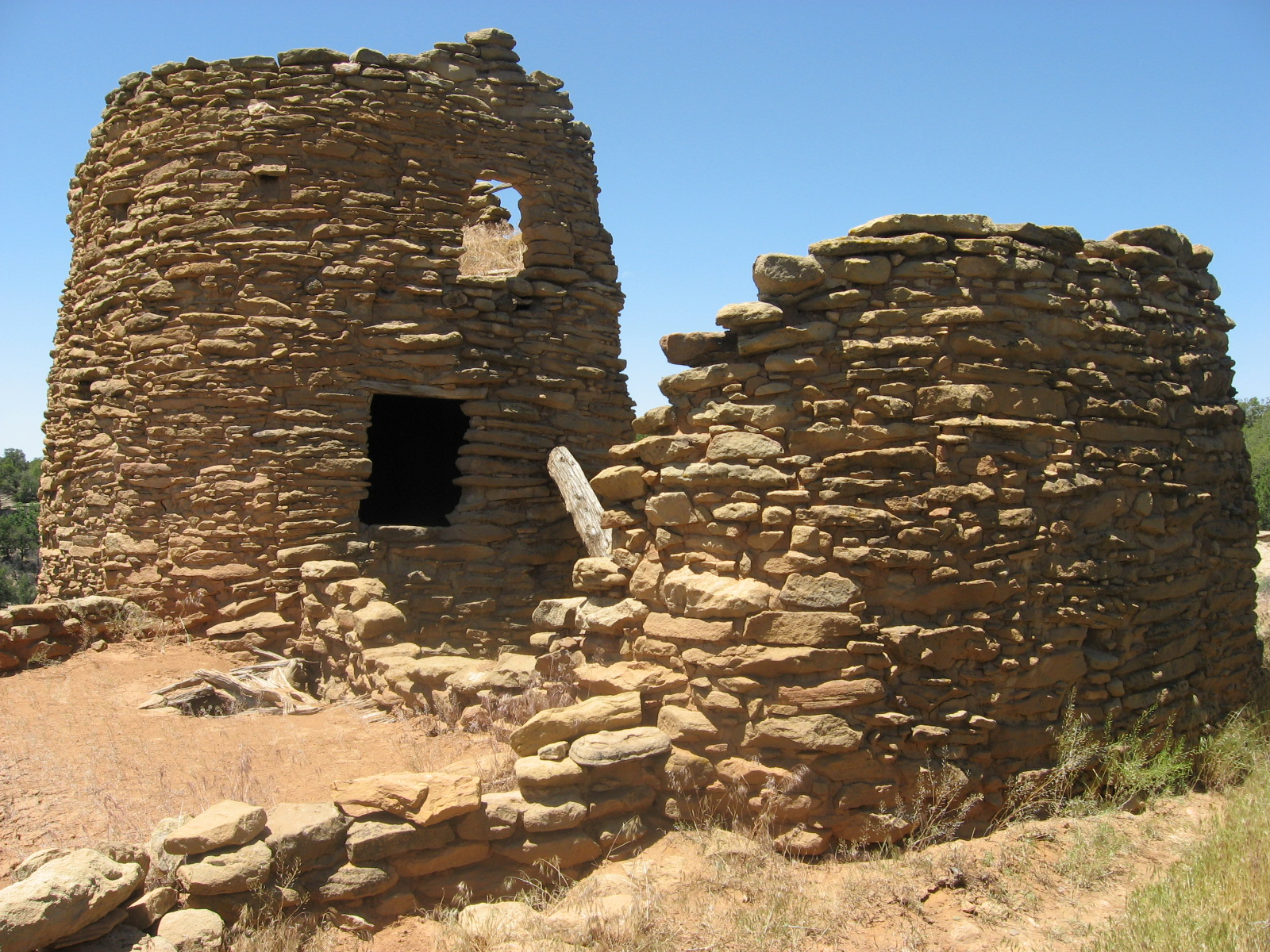
- Southeastern side of the ruin
- Nearest city: Blanco and Tierra Amarilla in New Mexico
- Coordinates: 36.764873°N 107.497937°W
- Area: 2.5 acres (1.0 ha) (original); 1.5 acres (0.61 ha) (increase)
- Built: 1716
- MPS: Navajo-Refugee Pueblo TR
- NRHP reference No.: 70000404 (original); 87000244 (increase)
- NMSRCP No.: 100

Significant dates
- Added to NRHP: September 4, 1970
- Boundary increase: January 21, 1987
- Designated NMSRCP: September 12, 1969

The Frances Canyon Ruin is a Navajo pueblito near Blanco in Rio Arriba County, New Mexico, United States. Built ca. 1716, it reflects economic and social changes taking place among the Navajo of this area during the 18th century. In the previous century the Spanish introduced sheep, fruit, cattle, and horses into the area. This, along with the Navajo's adaptation of certain pueblo lifeways after the Pueblo Revolt (1680-1692), led to increased settlement size and new trade relations. This site can be contrasted with modern Navajo communities which consist of clusters of hogans, widely dispersed with a trade system based on scattered trading posts and the motor vehicle.

It is one of the Navajo pueblitos.

== See also ==
- National Register of Historic Places listings in Rio Arriba County, New Mexico
