= Dinétah =

Traditional homeland of the Navajo tribe of Native Americans

Coordinates: 37°N 109°W

- People: Diné
- Language: Diné Bizaad, Hand Talk
- Country: Dinétah

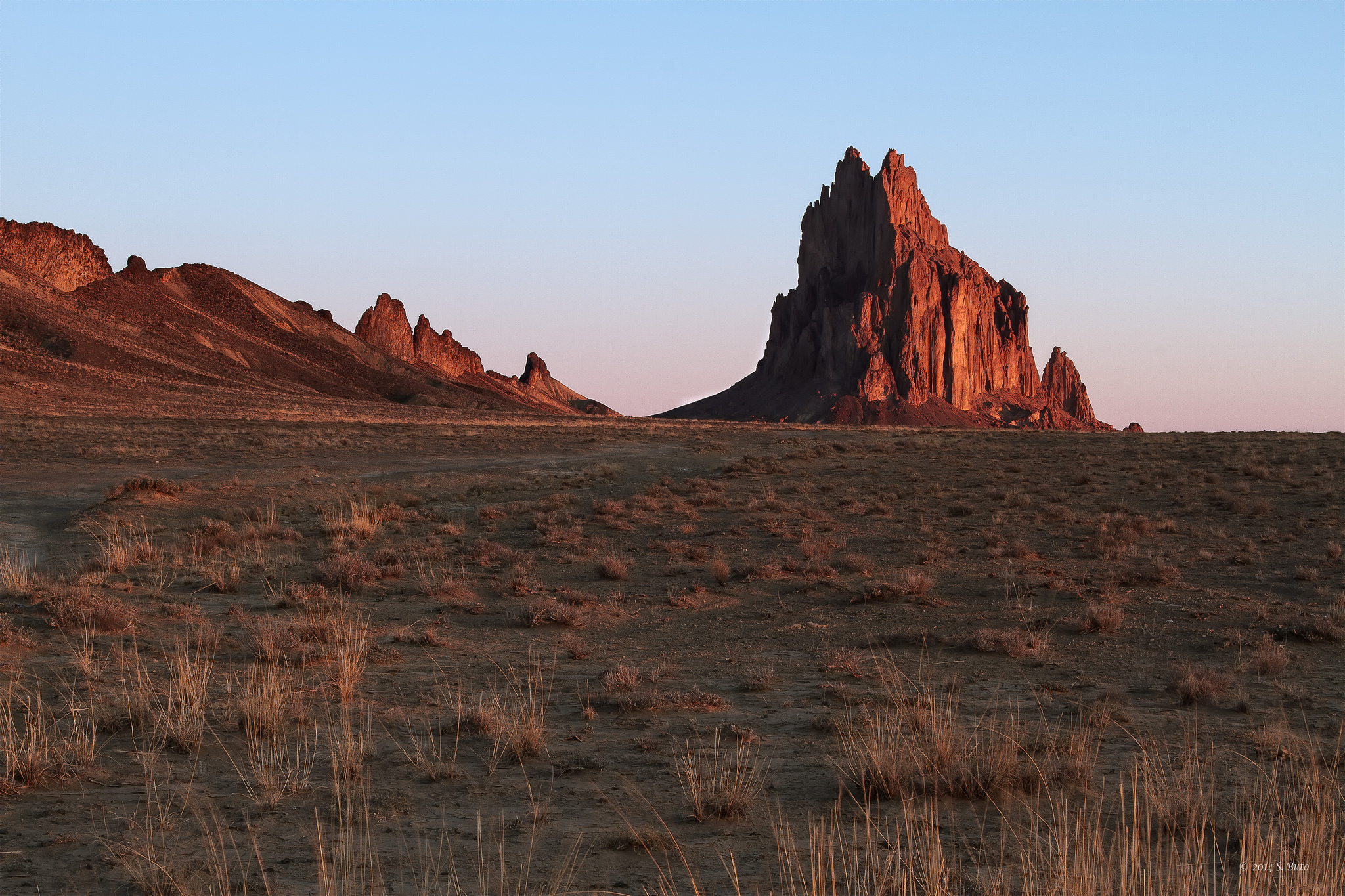
Shiprock (Navajo: Tsé Bitʼaʼí, "rock with wings" ), located in traditional Dinétah territory (northwestern New Mexico).

Dinétah is the traditional homeland of the Diné or Navajo, an Indigenous people of the Southwestern United States. In the Navajo language, the word "Dinétah" means "among the people" or "among the Navajo" (diné is the Navajo word that refers to the Navajo people; it also means "people" in the generic sense; -tah means "among, through, in the area of"). In the geographical sense, Dinétah encompasses a large area of northwestern New Mexico, southwestern Colorado, southeastern Utah, and northeastern Arizona. The boundaries are inexact, and are generally marked by mountain peaks which correspond to the four cardinal directions.

== Geography and topography ==
The Dinétah region is marked by high mesas and deep canyons that drain to the San Juan River. The canyons of the area are composed of irregular layers of sandstone, marked by multiple benches and talus slopes. Elevations average approximately 5,000 to 6,500 feet, with a few mountain peaks rising to more than 14,000 feet.

The traditional boundary of the land is demarcated by four mountains: Blanca Peak (Sis Naajinį́), to the east, Mount Taylor (Tsoodzil), to the south, the San Francisco Peaks (Dook'o'ooshį́į́), to the west, and Hesperus Peak, (Dibé Nitsaa), to the north.

== Cultural overview ==
The Navajo regard Dinétah as their ancestral homeland. The traditional Navajo creation story centers on the area, and Navajo place names within the region reflect its role in Navajo mythology.

While Dinétah generally refers to a large geographical area, the heart of the region is regarded to be the canyons of the Largo and Carrizo washes, south of the San Juan River in New Mexico. These canyons are located to the east and south of Farmington, New Mexico, and include Blanco, Largo, Carrizo and Gobernador Canyons.

The cultural significance of Dinétah is documented throughout Navajo oral history, and is supported by numerous archaeological and rock art sites. According to Navajo tradition, the infant Changing Woman (Asdzą́ą́ Nádleehé), one of the best known Navajo deities, was found by the Holy People (Diyin Dineʼé) on top of Gobernador Knob (Chʼóolʼį́ʼí), located within Dinétah area. The region is also indicated as the place to which the first four Navajo clans arrived after their migration from the north.

== Archaeological sites ==
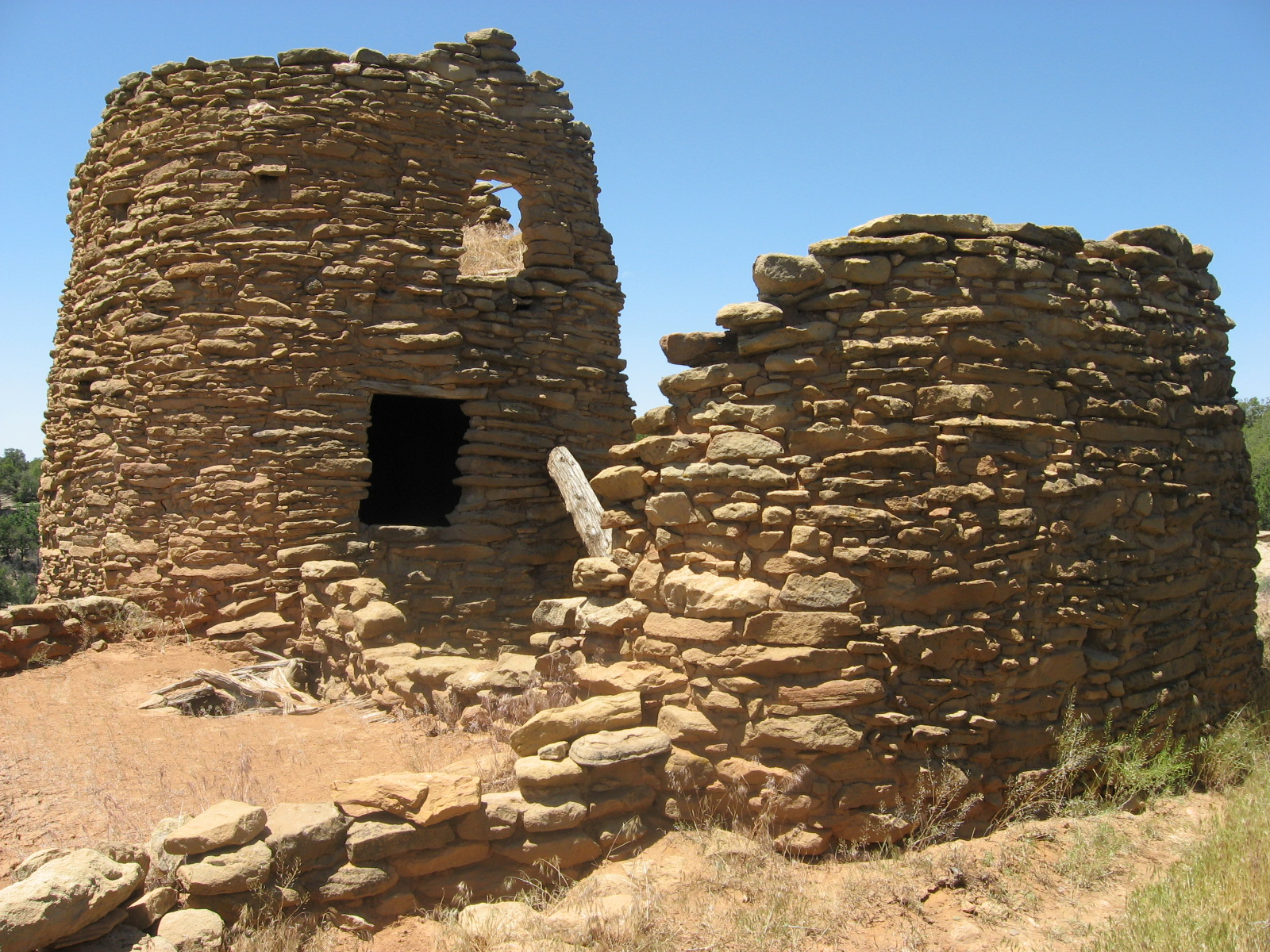
Frances Canyon Pueblito is a multi-roomed structure situated at the edge of a cliff in northwestern New Mexico.

There are thousands of recorded archaeological sites within the Dinétah region. The sites include the remains of several cultures, including the Ancestral Puebloans (also known as the Anasazi), the Navajo, and early Hispanic settlers. The naturally dry conditions of the region have contributed to a generally good state of preservation for a variety of site types, which include structures of stone and wood, as well as pictograph and petroglyph sites.

The most visible archaeological sites are known as Navajo pueblitos. These sites are usually stone structures consisting of from one to six rooms. The pueblitos are thought to date to the end of the 17th century, and appear to be largely defensive in nature. Pueblitos take the form of multi-storied towers, fort-like enclosures, and cliff dwellings. Several pueblitos are included on the List of Registered Historic Places in New Mexico.

== History ==
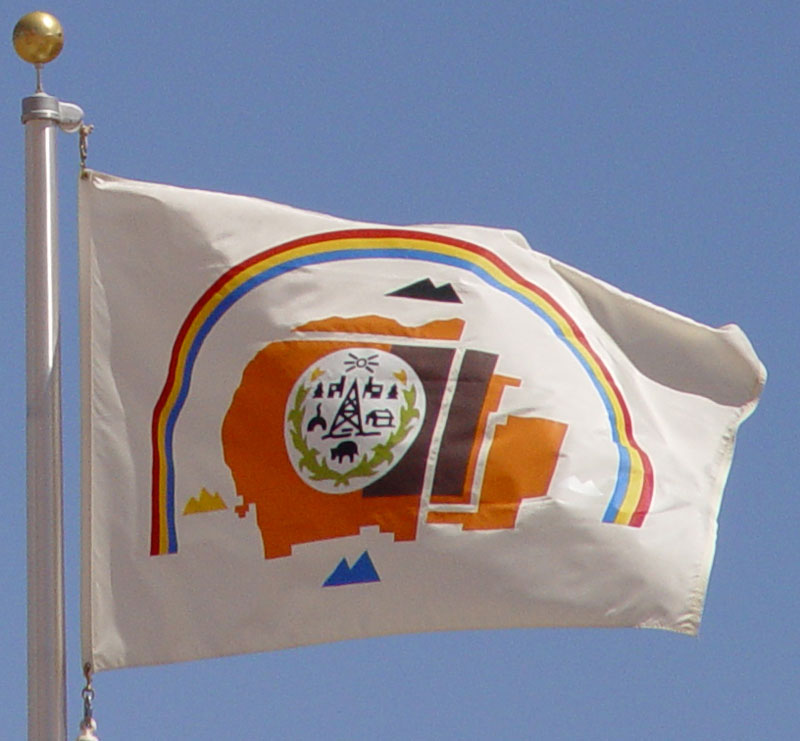
The flag of the Navajo Nation

There is increasing evidence for Navajo presence in Dinétah as early as 1500 CE. While there is continuing debate as to the dating of Navajo sites in the area, it is generally agreed that they inhabited Dinétah at some point well before the Pueblo Revolt of 1680.

The Navajo occupation of the region has been divided by archaeologists into two major phases - the Dinétah phase (ca. 1500-1630), which includes the entrance and settling of the area by the Navajo, and the Gobernador phase (ca. 1630-1800), during which time the Navajo culture became fully defined. The difference between the two phases has been based on the recovery of Gobernador Polychrome ceramic shards from reliably dated sites, and the presence of pueblitos.

== See also ==
- Four Corners
- Navajo Nation
- 51st state#By partition of or secession from U.S. states
- Canyon de Chelly
- Denendeh, a name from the same root words used to refer the Northwest Territories in Canada
