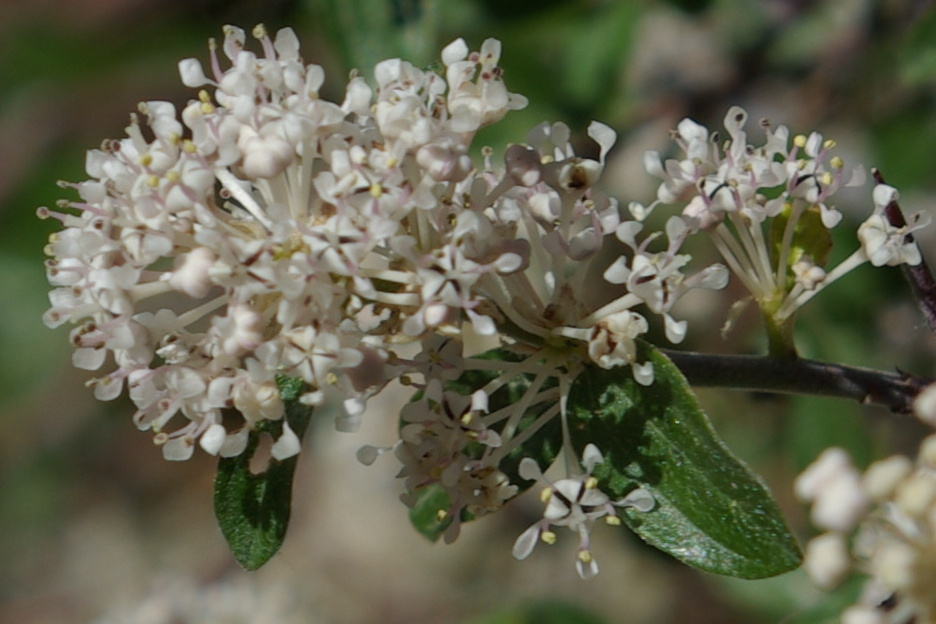

Scientific classification
- Kingdom: Plantae
- Clade: Tracheophytes
- Clade: Angiosperms
- Clade: Eudicots
- Clade: Rosids
- Order: Rosales
- Family: Rhamnaceae
- Genus: Ceanothus
- Species: C. fendleri

Binomial name
- Ceanothus fendleri A. Gray

= Ceanothus fendleri =

Species of flowering plant

Ceanothus fendleri (Fendler['s] ceanothus, Fendler['s] buckbrush, deer brier) is a species of flowering shrub native to northern Mexico, Arizona, New Mexico, west Texas and the northeastern Texas panhandle, Utah, Colorado, eastern Wyoming, and western South Dakota. Its typical habitat is pine forests from 1,500 to 3,000 meters (4,900 to 9,800 ft) in altitude.

== Description ==
Fendler's ceanothus seldom exceeds 1 m (3.3 ft) tall. The stems and twigs are grayish green when young, reddish brown when mature, armed with spines up to 2.5 cm (0.98 in) long. The leaves are green and thick, and three-veined from the base.

The flowers are about 2 mm across and white, borne in thick clusters emanating from the leaf axils, particularly on the older stems. They all open at once, so the plant is covered with bloom. This usually happens in June or July, but may be any time from April to October according to the altitude and weather. As in other ceanothuses, there are five spoon-shaped or hooded petals, each partly covering a stamen.

The fruits are three-celled capsules, pink and glossy, forming an approximate rounded equilateral triangle with the stem at the center. They typically ripen in August and September. When dry these pods exhibit explosive dehiscence, throwing the seeds out forcefully. The seeds are glossy dark brown, about 2 mm across.

== Animal interactions ==
Deer are particularly fond of browsing on Fendler's ceanothus. In a study at Beaver Creek, Arizona, it was important to mule deer all year and constituted up to 6.9 percent of their summer diet and might constitute even more where other forage species are less common. Elk also eat it, as do North American porcupines, jackrabbits, and livestock to a lesser extent.

The caterpillars of Erynnis pacuvius, the buckthorn duskywing, feed on this plant and other species of Ceanothus.

== Ethnobotany ==
- Some have dried the leaves as a substitute for tea.
- The Acoma and Laguna Pueblo people ate the fruits.
- The Navajos combined this shrub and green gentian to make a medicine applied internally or externally, for "alarm and nervousness".
