= Water glyphs =

Type of petroglyph

Water glyphs are a recurring type of petroglyph found across the American southwest, but primarily in southern Utah, northern Arizona, and Nevada. The symbols are thought to be of ancient origin (perhaps created by the Ancestral Puebloans) and have been dated using x-ray fluorescence to around 2000 years. Classification as a water glyph requires the presence of certain distinctive characteristics including both visual elements and location. Although the glyphs have likely been previously noted by local ranchers and farmers, the recurring pattern was first documented in 1997.

To date, more than 449 instances of these petroglyphs had been cataloged in an extensive GIS study.

== Visual elements ==
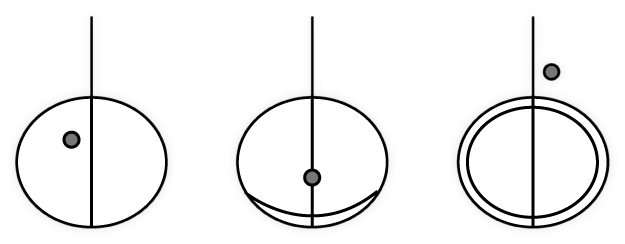
A few known variations of water glyphs

Water glyphs are usually 48 inches long by 24 inches wide, with grooves carved half an inch to an inch deep.

- The symbol consists of a circle or ellipse bisected by a single straight line.
- The line usually extends beyond the edge of the circle on one side by a distance roughly equal to the diameter of the circle.
- Sometimes the extending line drops off the edge of the cliff or rock.
- The petroglyph usually contains a single deep depression, or "dot", within or near the circle.

Examples:

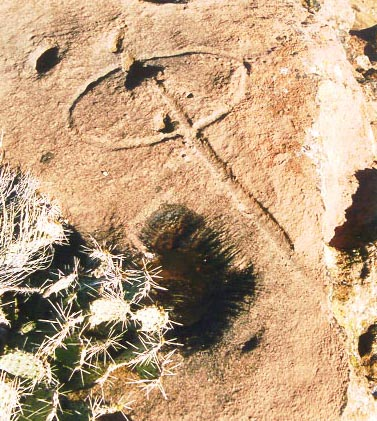
Basic glyph

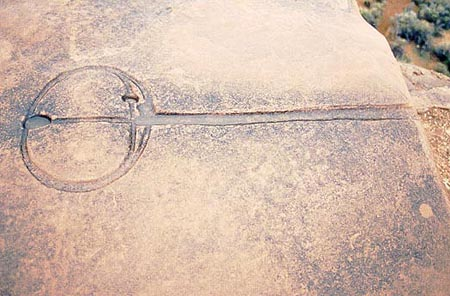
Double "front" horizon and multiple "dots"

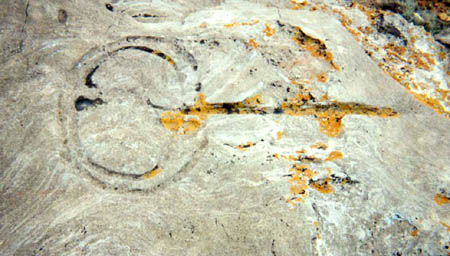
Double horizion

The position of the dot with respect to the glyph varies:

- It may be found outside or within the circle.
- It may be found to the right or left of the bisecting line.
- It may be found along one of the circular "horizon" lines.

The circle may also contain additional arcs or partial arcs, forming a crescent on one side of the ring, or a double ellipse; but the basic glyph remains the same.

== Location ==
Many petroglyphs and pictographs are located on cliff faces or under vertical overhangs, where they receive some limited protection from the elements. Water glyphs, however, typically lie along horizontal cliff edges or exposed rock surfaces. Occurrences of water glyphs are sometimes associated with the presence of Moki steps.

== Theories ==
In consideration of the orientations of the line and circle motifs within the pictographs, the authors of this research conclude that waterglyphs are directional markers pointing toward sources of water throughout the arid Arizona Strip.

Amateur archaeologists Robert Ford and Dixon Spendlove assert that the symbols were used by the ancient Pueblo peoples to mark springs or other important travel information in the desert. They assert that a high percentage of these symbols indicates line-of-sight directions to finding a natural spring, water pocket or pool, or ancient village site. They hypothesize that the symbols could be followed, from one water source to the next, across the entire Arizona Strip.

Opposing theories include use of these petroglyphs as astronomical/solstice markers, sacrificial altars or writings left by early Spanish explorers.

== Publications ==
- First publication of the research, January 1997
- Waterglyphs: Ancient Cartography of the Arizona Strip published in the September 2004 URARA Symposium Journal
- In Situ: Newsletter of the Nevada Archaeological Association, 2006. Vol 10, No. 2, pg. 8
