= Cliff dwelling =

Human dwelling in a cliff

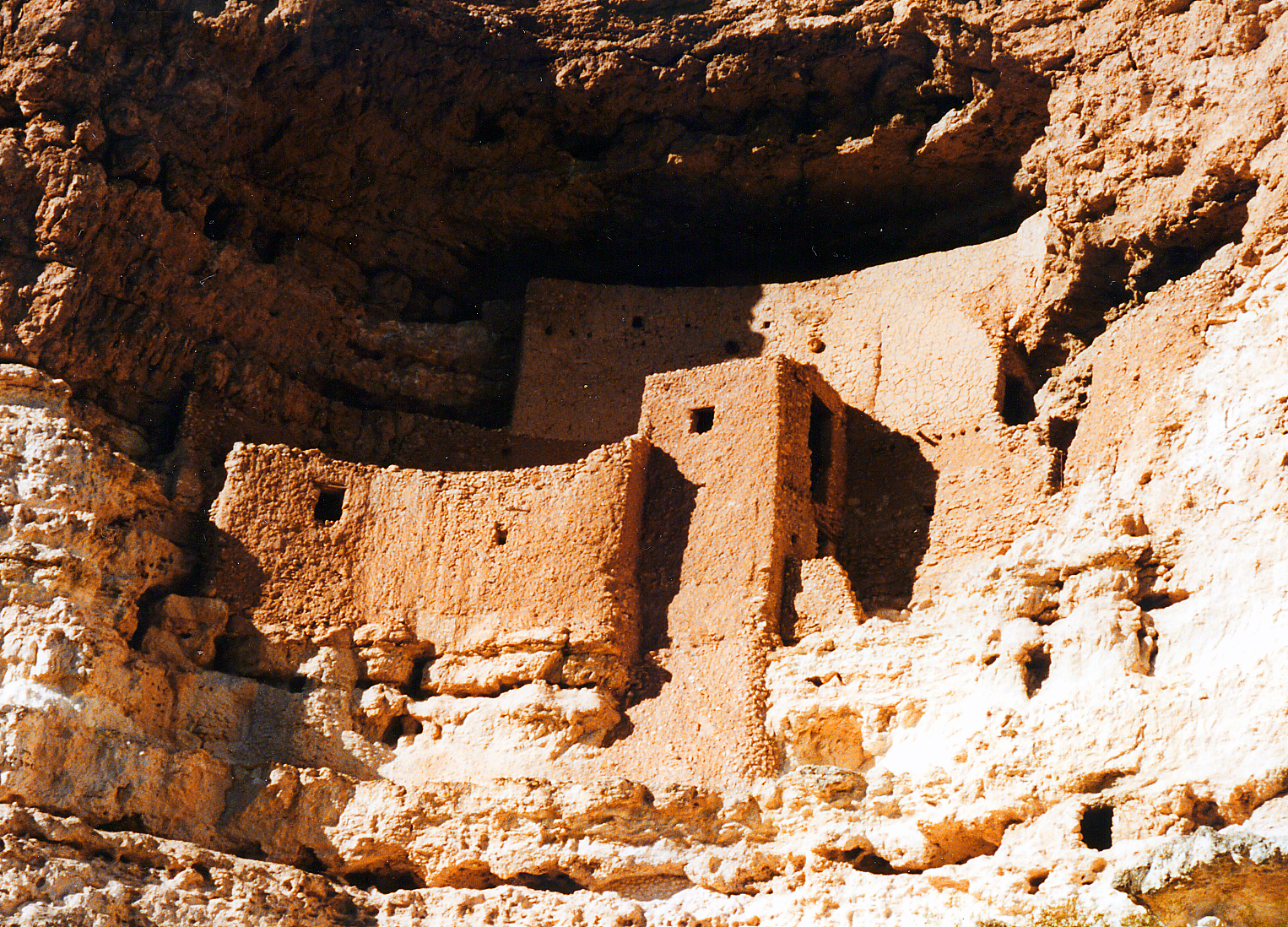
Sinagua cliff dwelling (Montezuma Castle), Arizona

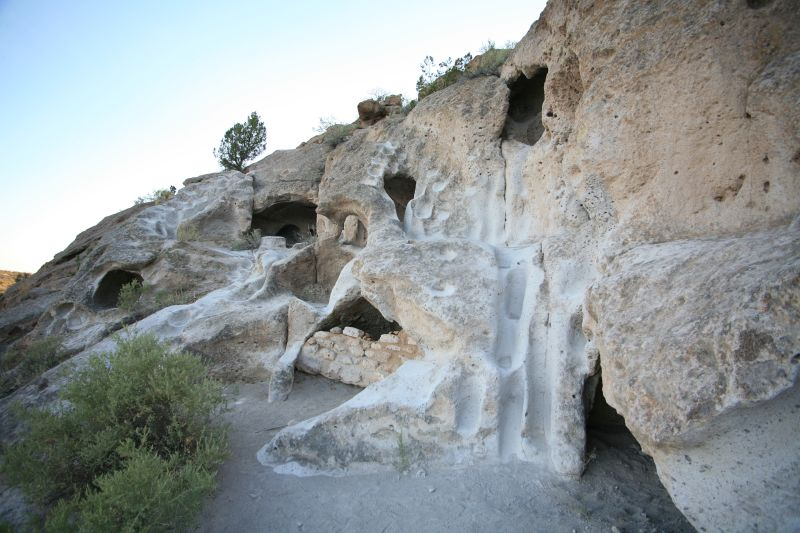
Cavates and pathways in soft tuff at Tsankawi, New Mexico

In archaeology, cliff dwellings are dwellings formed by using niches or caves in high cliffs, and sometimes with excavation or additions in the way of masonry. Two special types of cliff dwelling are distinguished by archaeologists: the cliff-house, which is actually built on levels in the cliff, and the cavate, which is dug out, by using natural recesses or openings.

Rock-cut architecture generally refers to rather grander temples, but also tombs, cut into rock, although for example the Ajanta Caves in India, of the 2nd century BCE to 5th century CE, probably housed several hundred Buddhist monks and are cut into a cliff, as are the Mogao Caves in China.

Famous cliff dwellings are found around the world. In China, the Guyaju Caves located near Dongmenying, Yanqing District, Beijing are a cave complex of many rock hewn dwellings that form a community. In the United States and Mexico, among the canyons of the southwest, in Arizona, New Mexico, Utah, Colorado, and Chihuahua, some cliff dwellings are still used by Native Americans. There has been considerable discussion as to their antiquity, but modern research finds no definite justification for assigning them to an earlier culture distinct from the ancestors of the modern Pueblo people. The area in which they occur coincides with that in which other traces of the Pueblo tribes have been found. The niches that were used are often of considerable size, occurring in cliffs up to a thousand feet in height, and approached by rock steps or log ladders.

== See also ==
- Moki steps
- Tellem
- Timeline of dendrochronology timestamp events
- Water glyphs
