= Petroglyph =

Images carved on a rock surface as a form of rock art

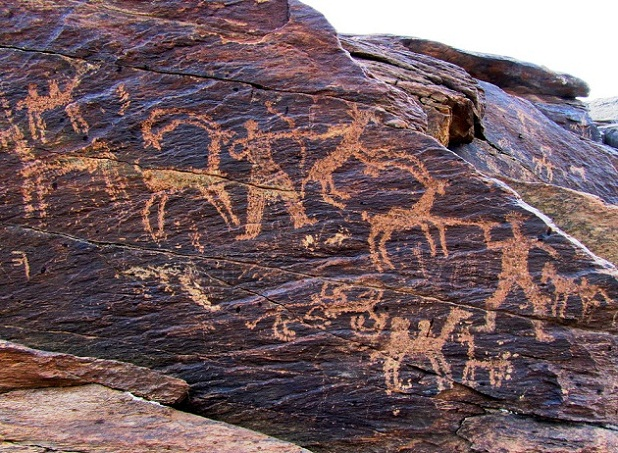
Rock art in Iran, Teimareh region

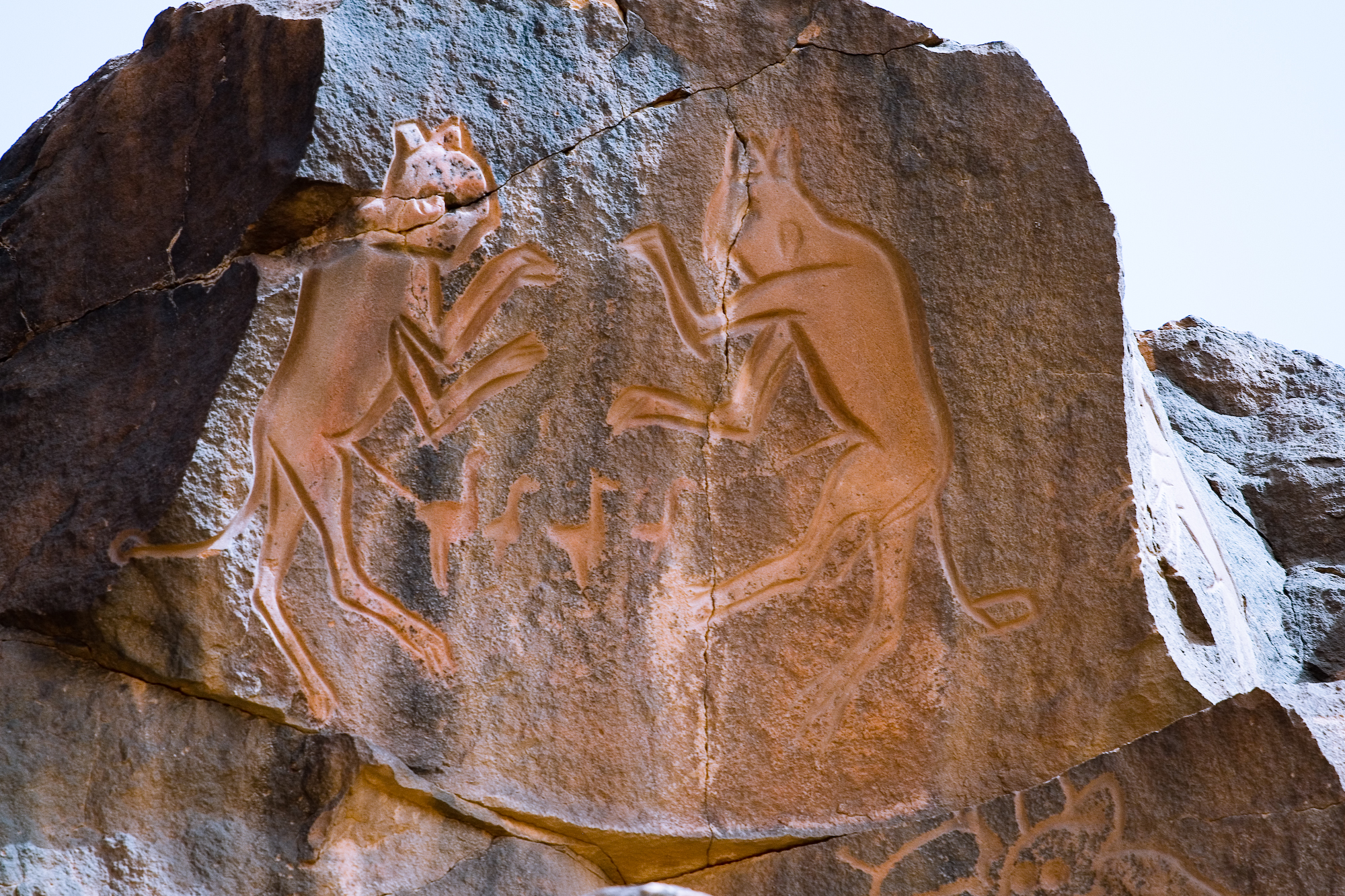
Rock carving known as Meerkatze (named by archaeologist Leo Frobenius), rampant lionesses in Wadi Mathendous, Mesak Settafet region of Libya.

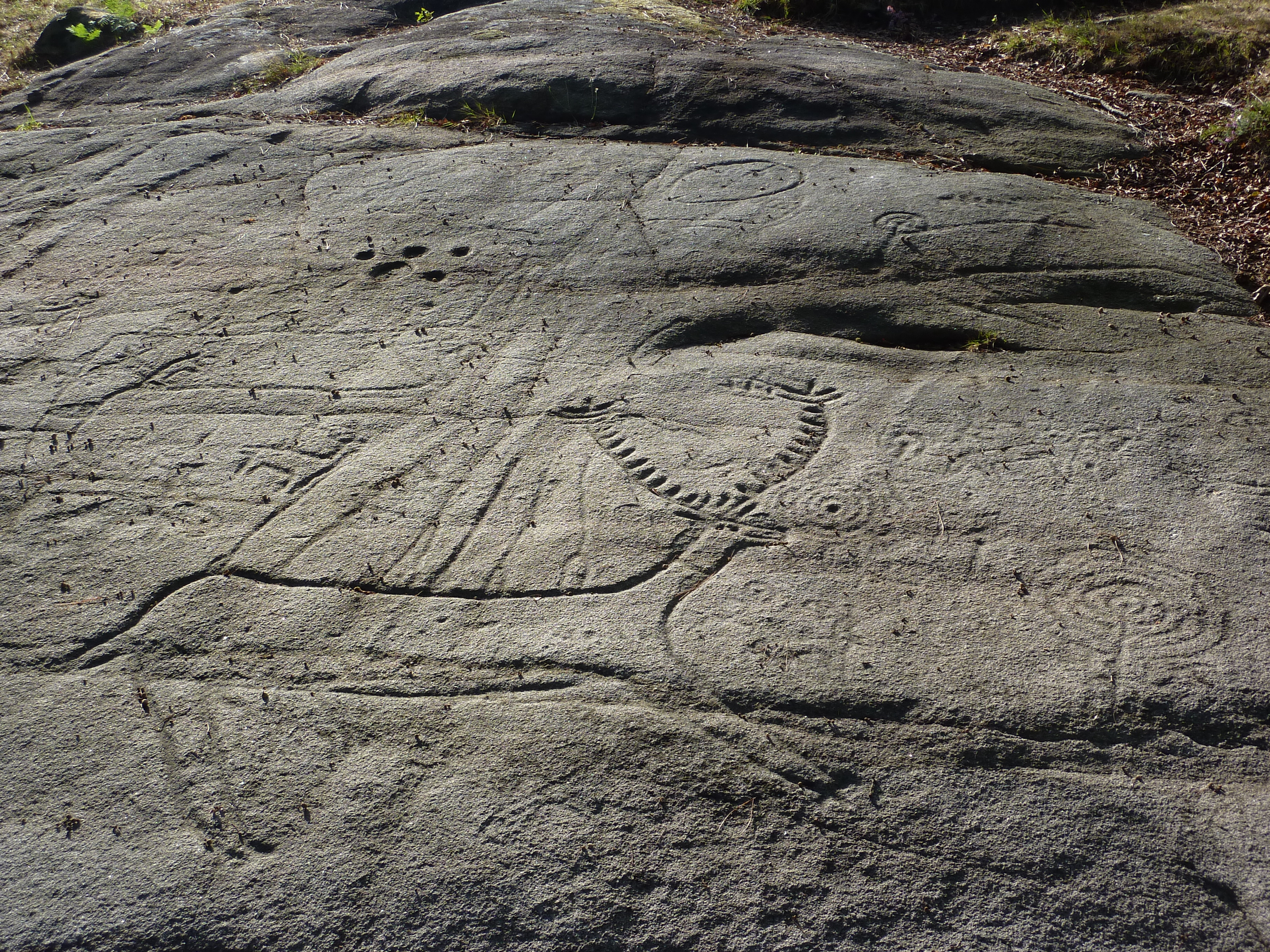
European petroglyphs: Laxe dos carballos in Campo Lameiro, Galicia, Spain (4th–2nd millennium BCE), depicting cup and ring marks and deer hunting scenes

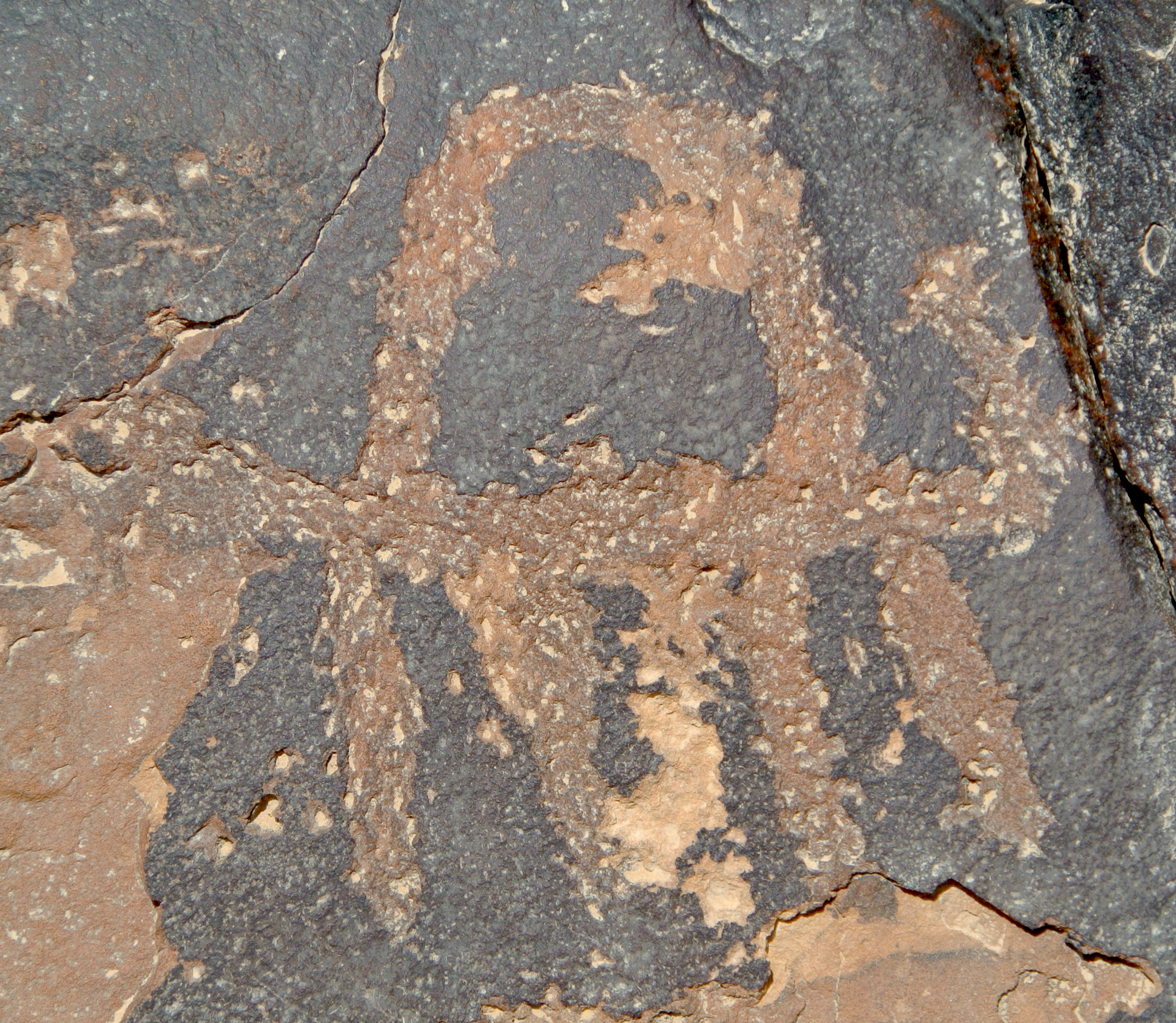
Petroglyph of a camel, Negev, southern Israel

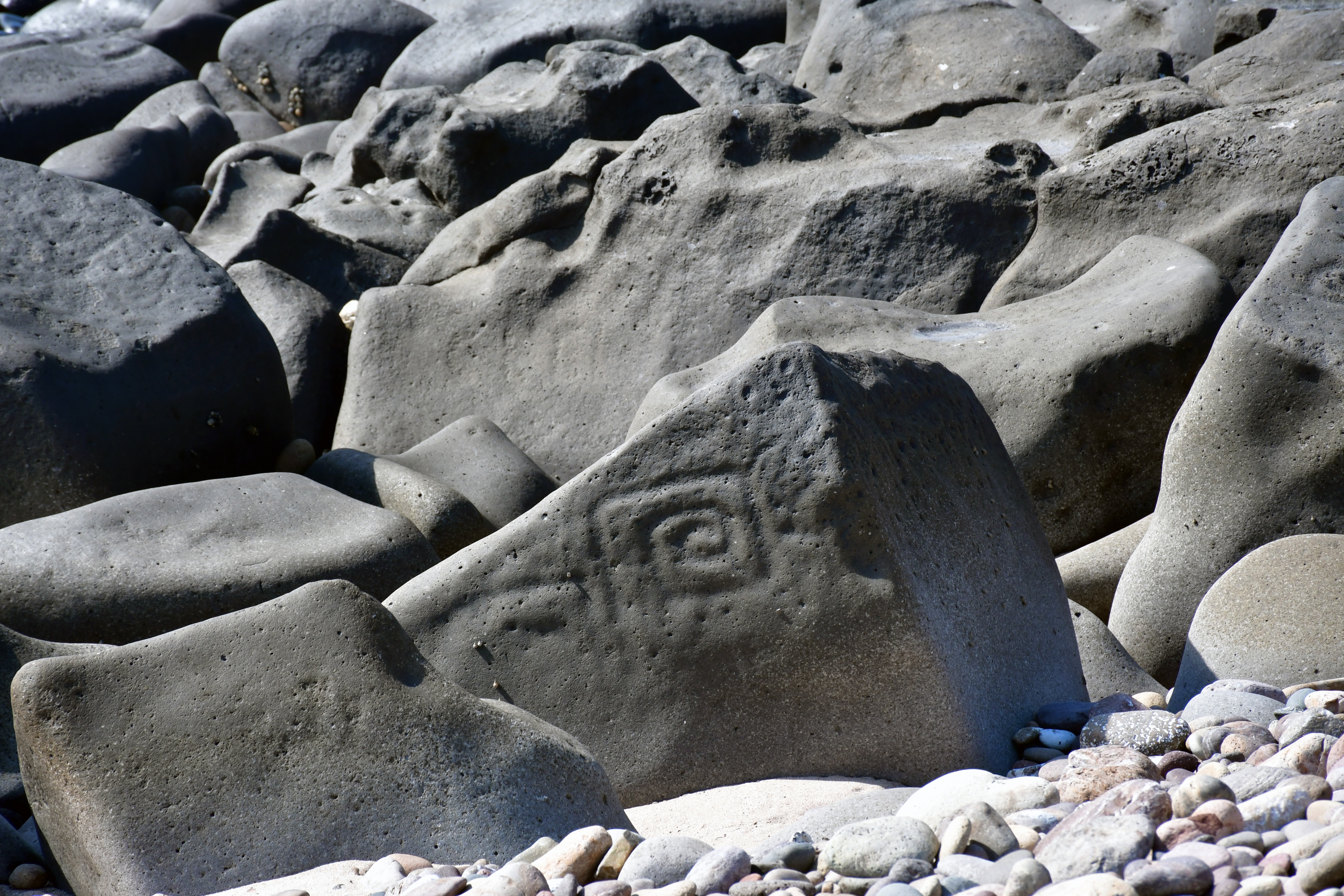
Petroglyphs of the archaeological site of Las Labradas, situated on the coast of the municipality of San Ignacio, Sinaloa, Mexico

A petroglyph is an image created by removing part of a rock surface by incising, picking, carving, or abrading, as a form of rock art. The term generally refers to rock engravings of ancient origin, often associated with prehistoric peoples. The oldest petroglyphs in the world are deemed to be those at Murujuga in Western Australia, which are 40,000–50,000 years old. Some petroglyphs are classified as protected monuments and some have been added to the list of UNESCO's World Heritage Sites, or such status has been applied for.

== Etymology and meaning ==
The word petroglyph comes from the Greek prefix petro-, from πέτρα petra meaning "stone", and γλύφω glýphō meaning "carve", and was originally coined in French as pétroglyphe.

In scholarly texts, a petroglyph is a rock engraving, whereas a petrograph (or pictograph) is a rock painting. In common usage, the words are sometimes used interchangeably.

Petroglyphs and petrographs both belong to the wider and more general category of rock art or parietal art. Petroforms, or patterns and shapes made by many large rocks and boulders over the ground, are quite different. Inuksuk are not petroglyphs, but human-made rock forms found in Arctic regions.

== History ==
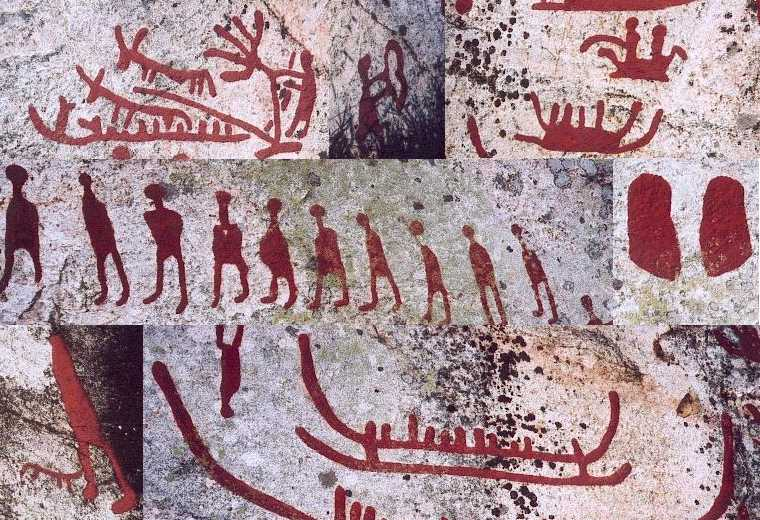
Composite image of petroglyphs from Scandinavia (Häljesta, Västmanland in Sweden). Nordic Bronze Age. The glyphs have been painted to make them more visible.

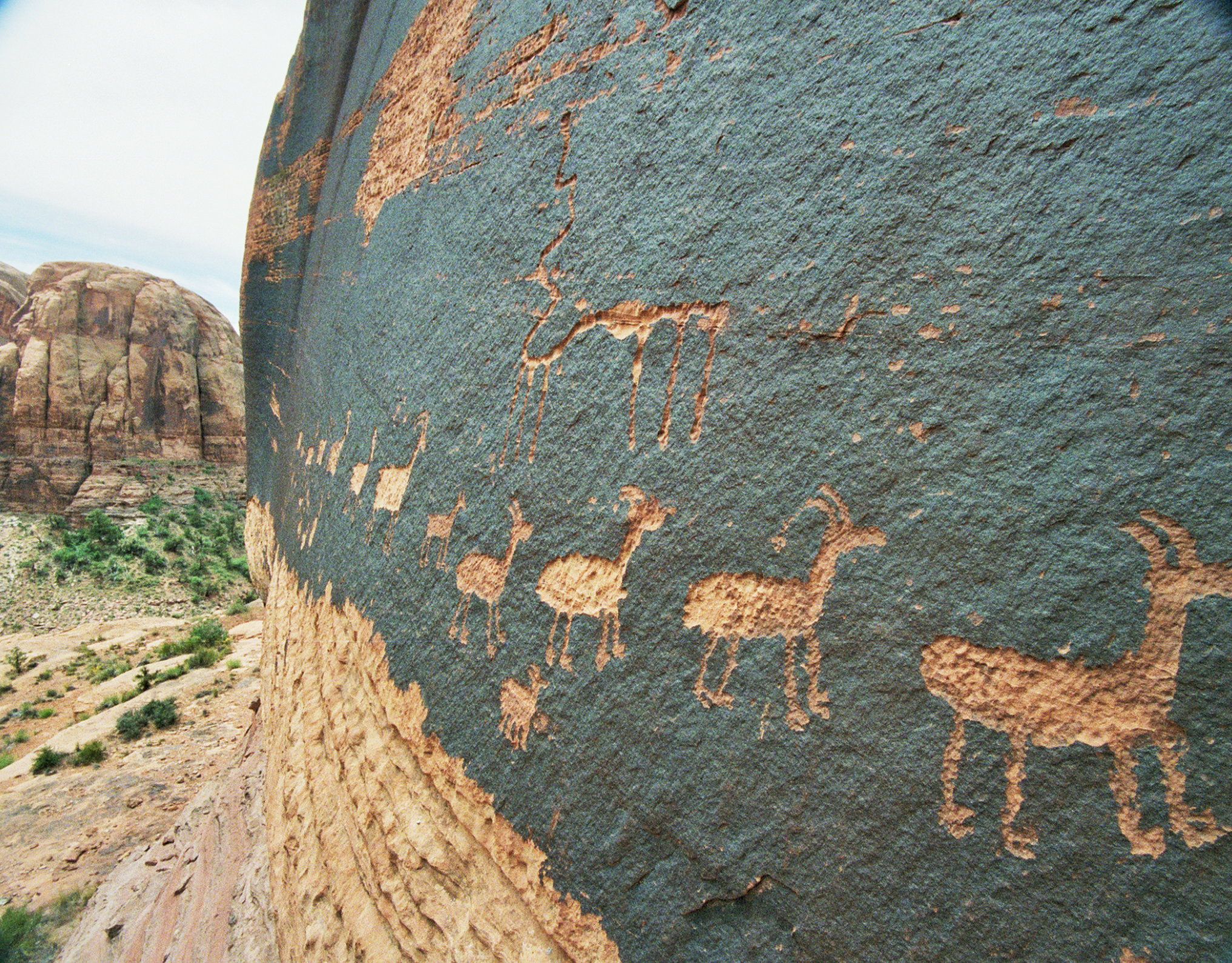
A petroglyph of a caravan of bighorn sheep near Moab, Utah, United States; a common theme in glyphs from the desert Southwest and Great Basin

Petroglyphs have been found in all parts of the globe except Antarctica, with the highest concentrations in parts of Africa, Scandinavia, and Siberia. Many examples of petroglyphs found globally are dated to approximately the Neolithic and late Upper Paleolithic boundary (roughly 10,000 to 12,000 years ago).

The oldest petrogryphs are those in Murujuga, Western Australia, some of which are estimated to be 40,000–50,000 years old. The Murujuga site was declared a World Heritage Site in July 2025.

Around 7,000 to 9,000 years ago, following the introduction of a number of precursors of writing systems, the existence and creation of petroglyphs began to suffer and tail off, with different forms of art, such as pictographs and ideograms, taking their place. However, petroglyphs continued to be created and remained somewhat common, with various cultures continuing to use them for differing lengths of time, including cultures who continued to create them until contact with Western culture was made in the 19th and 20th centuries.

== Interpretation ==
Many hypotheses exist as to the purpose of petroglyphs, depending on their location, age, and subject matter. Some petroglyph images most likely held a deep cultural and religious significance for the societies that created them. Many petroglyphs are thought to represent a type of symbolic or ritualistic language or communication style that remains not fully understood. Others, such as geocontourglyphs, more clearly depict or represent a landform or the surrounding terrain, such as rivers and other geographic features.

Some petroglyph maps, which depict trails as well as contain symbols communicating the time and distances travelled along those trails, exist. Other petroglyph maps act as astronomical markers. As well as holding geographic and astronomical importance, other petroglyphs may also have been a by-product of various rituals: sites in India, for example, have seen some petroglyphs identified as musical instruments or "rock gongs".

Some petroglyphs likely formed types of symbolic communication, such as types of proto-writing. Later glyphs from the Nordic Bronze Age in Scandinavia seem to refer to some form of territorial boundary between tribes, in addition to holding possible religious meanings. Petroglyph styles have been recognised as having local or regional "dialects" from similar or neighboring peoples. Siberian inscriptions loosely resemble an early form of runes, although no direct relationship has been established.

Petroglyphs from different continents show similarities. While people would be inspired by their direct surroundings, it is harder to explain the common styles. This could be mere coincidence, an indication that certain groups of people migrated widely from some initial common area, or indication of a common origin. In 1853, George Tate presented a paper to the Berwick Naturalists' Club, at which a John Collingwood Bruce agreed that the carvings had "... a common origin, and indicate a symbolic meaning, representing some popular thought." In his cataloguing of Scottish rock art, Ronald Morris summarized 104 different theories on their interpretation.

Other theories suggest that petroglyphs were carved by spiritual leaders, such as shamans, in an altered state of consciousness, perhaps induced by the use of natural hallucinogens. Many of the geometric patterns (known as form constants) which recur in petroglyphs and cave paintings have been shown by David Lewis-Williams to be hardwired into the human brain. They frequently occur in visual disturbances and hallucinations brought on by drugs, migraine, and other stimuli.

The Rock Art Research Institute of the University of the Witwatersrand studies present-day links between religion and rock art among the San people of the Kalahari Desert. Though the San people's artworks are predominantly paintings, the beliefs behind them can possibly be used as a basis for understanding other types of rock art, including petroglyphs.

== See also ==
- Geoglyph
- History of communication
- List of Stone Age art
- Megalithic art
- Pecked curvilinear nucleated
- Petrosomatoglyph
- Runestone and image stone
- Water glyphs
