= Hogan =

Primary traditional home of the Navajo people

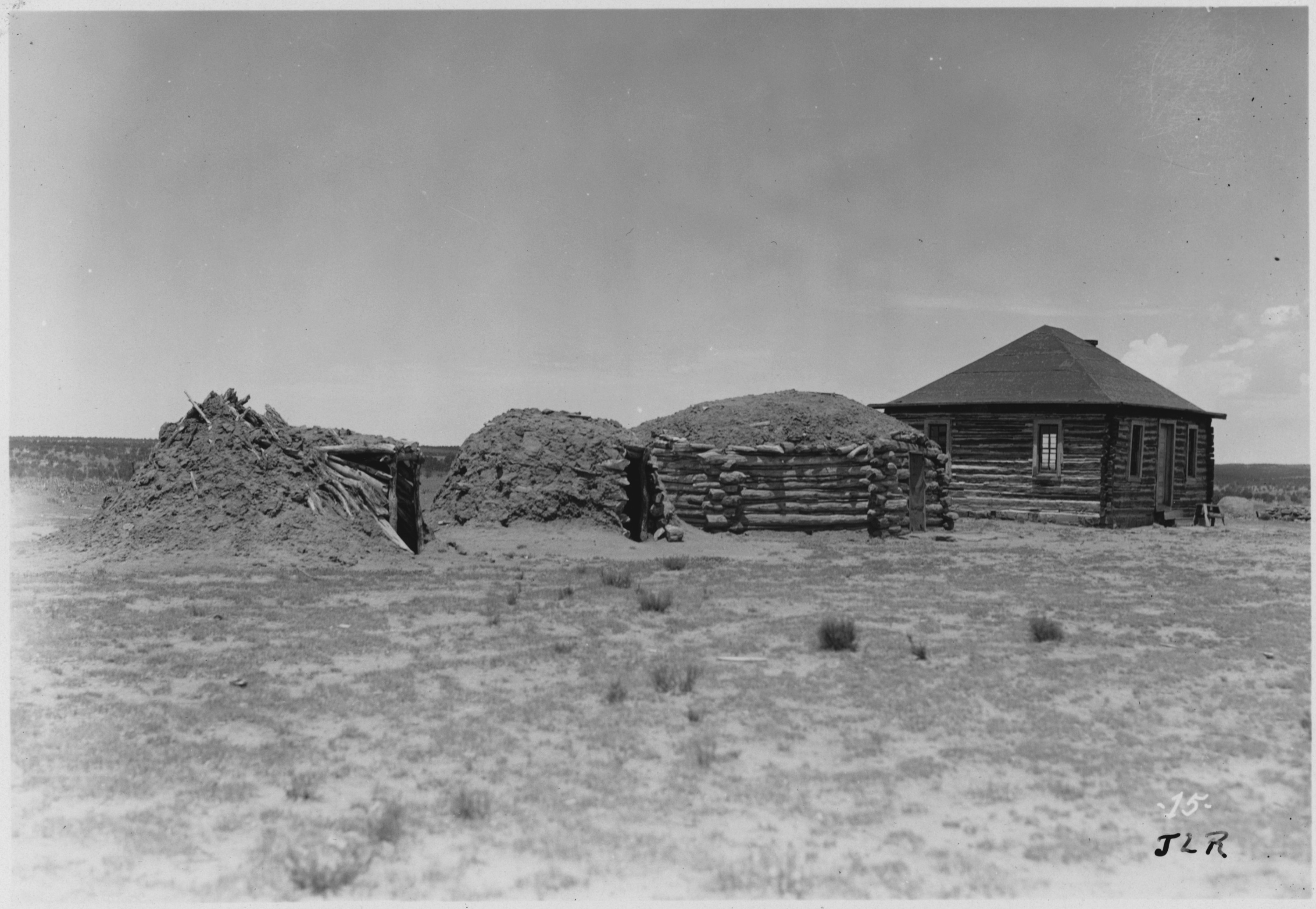
The evolution of the hogan as of the 1930s.

A hogan (/ˈhoʊɡɑːn/ or /ˈhoʊɡən/; from Navajo hooghan [hoːɣan]) is the primary, traditional dwelling of the Navajo people. A hogan has walls and roof of timber, with or without internal support posts, and is covered with packed earth and stone in varying amounts. Hogans can be round, cone-shaped, multi-sided, or square; the door traditionally faces east to welcome the rising sun.

Today, while some older hogans are still used as dwellings and others are maintained for ceremonial purposes, new hogans are rarely intended as family dwellings.

== Types ==
Hogans are traditionally classified as "male" or "female" types. The older "male" hogan, also called the forked-stick hogan, is cone-shaped and built from three interlocking forked poles with the gaps filled by soil, grass, and bark, leaving a smoke hole and an east-facing entrance. This form is used primarily for religious or private ceremonies.

The "female" hogan is more common and considerably larger, serving as the family dwelling. It has a circular or polygonal base with walls of logs or stone and a dome-shaped roof formed of cribbed logs covered with earth. Beginning in the 1900s, Navajos began constructing hogans in hexagonal and octagonal shapes, a change partly attributed to the availability of wooden railroad cross-ties that could be laid horizontally to form taller walls with more interior space.

== Cultural and ceremonial significance ==
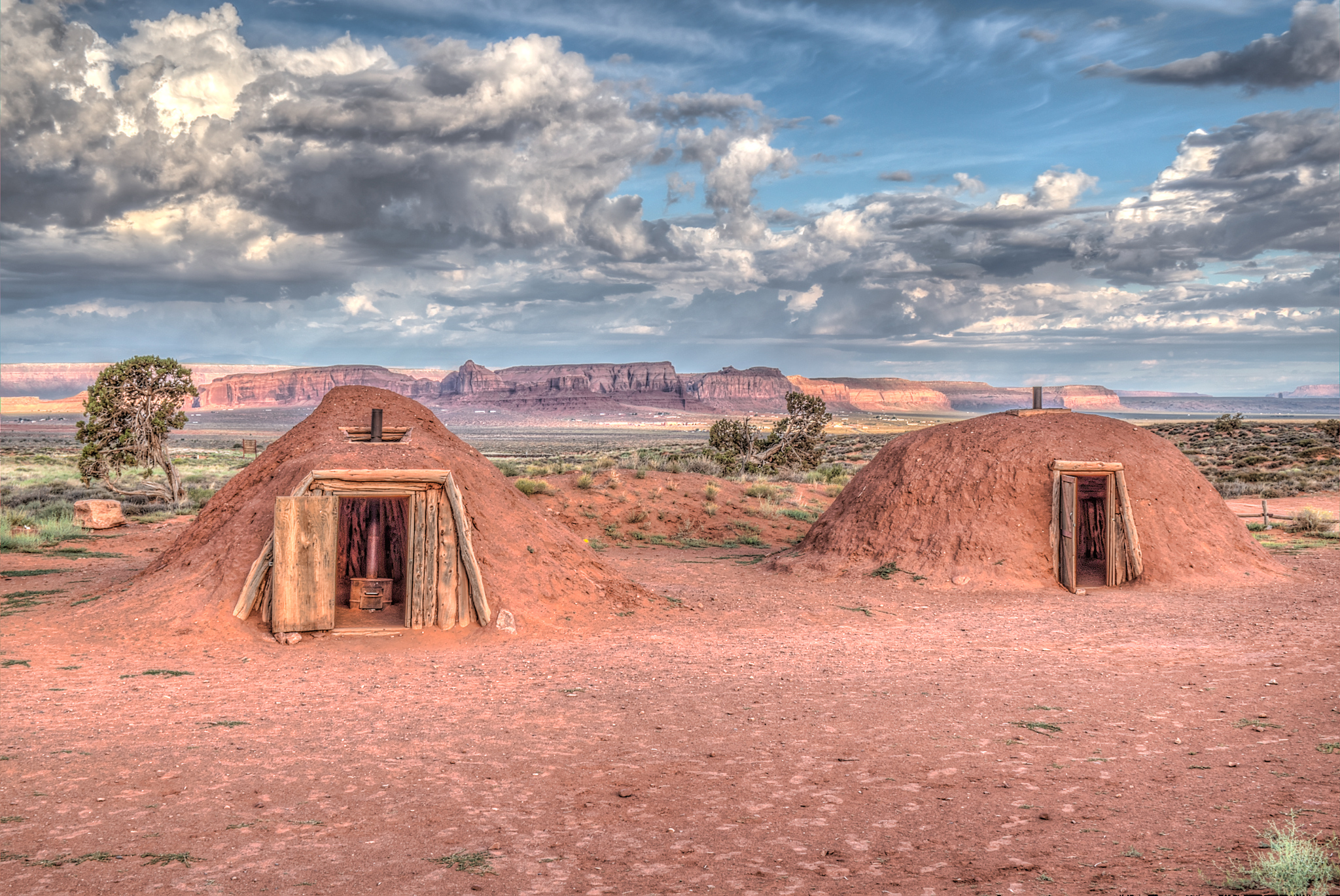
Hogan at Monument Valley Navajo Tribal Park

In Navajo tradition, the hogan is considered a sacred space. The Blessingway narrative describes the first hogan as built by Coyote with help from beavers as a home for First Man and First Woman, with poles made of white shell, abalone, turquoise, and jet. The east-facing entrance aligns with Navajo cosmology, connecting the structure to the rising sun. The four cardinal directions represented within the hogan correspond to the four sacred mountains of the Navajo homeland.

Construction of a new hogan is traditionally consecrated with a Blessingway ceremony, a house blessing rite in which the main posts are anointed with cornmeal or corn pollen in a clockwise direction. The interior space follows prescribed divisions: men occupy the south side, women the north, with the senior married couple at the west.

Several taboos are associated with the hogan. If a person dies inside, the body is either buried within the structure and the entry sealed, or removed through a hole made in the north wall; in either case, the hogan is permanently abandoned and often burned. A hogan may also become taboo if struck by lightning or disturbed by a bear, and wood from such structures is never reused.

== Energy efficiency ==
Hogans are energy efficient: using packed mud against the wooden walls, the home was kept cool in summer by natural ventilation and water sprinkled on the packed dirt floor. In winter the fireplace kept the inside warm well into the night, due to the high specific heat capacity of the earth in the construction. The rounded shape of the dome also helps conserve heat during the cold winters of the high mesas of the Southwest.

== Modern application and revival ==
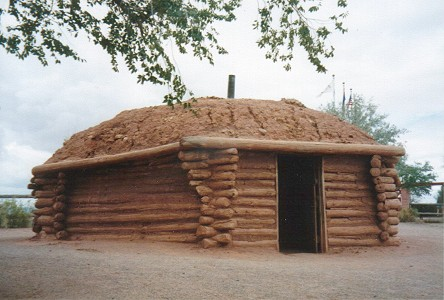
Modern day hogan.

The use of the hogan as a primary dwelling declined through the 20th century, largely because government and lender funding for housing on the Navajo Nation favored HUD-standardized construction, which did not accommodate the hogan's traditional form. Families who wished to live in hogans often had to build their own, as standardized housing requirements for bathrooms and kitchens were difficult to incorporate into the traditional design.

Efforts to revive hogan construction began in the late 1990s. In 2001, a joint venture involving the Navajo Nation, Northern Arizona University, and the US Forest Service began building log hogans using materials from a Navajo-owned log home factory in Cameron, Arizona, next to the Cameron Chapter House. The project used surplus wood culled from Northern Arizona forests to prevent wildfires. While providing the traditional sacred space of the hogan, the new construction also met requirements for modern amenities. The project provided jobs, summer school construction experience for Navajo teens, and new public buildings.

More recently, the Navajo Hogan Project, founded by Karen Begay, has built traditional eight-sided hogans from natural materials such as juniper, pine, and packed earth to shelter homeless Navajo families, with support from the Arizona Commission for the Arts and the Southwest Folklife Alliance.

== Etymology ==
Possible Native American sources of the English word hogan:

- hooghan in Navajo
- gowąh (Western Apache)
- guughą or kuughą (Chiricahua)

== See also ==
- Wigwam
- Earth lodge
- Longhouse
