= Edward S. Curtis =

American ethnologist and photographer (1868–1952)

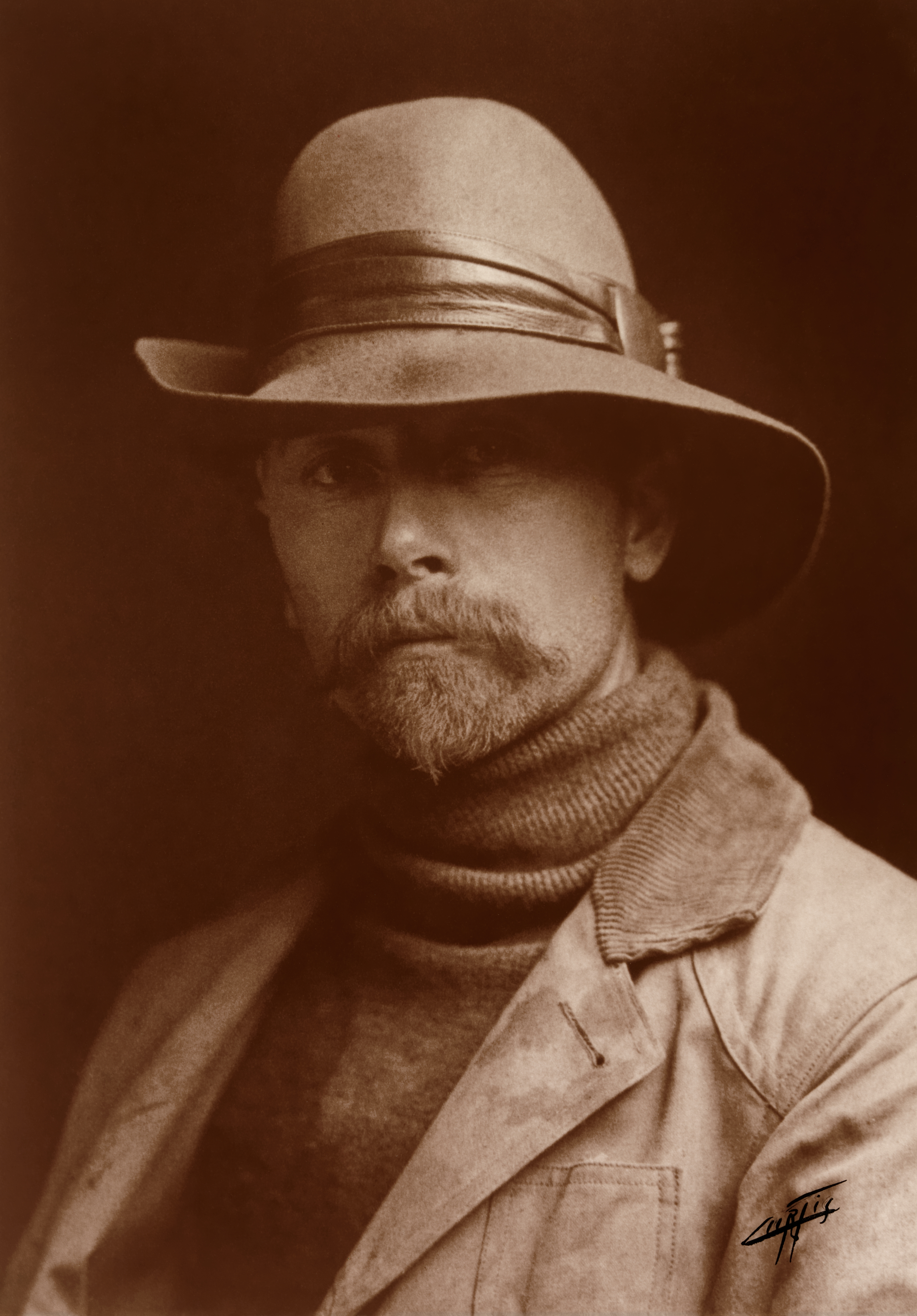
- Self-portrait, c. 1889
- Born: Edward Sherriff Curtis; February 19, 1868; Town of Cold Spring, Wisconsin, U.S.
- Died: October 19, 1952 (aged 84); Los Angeles, California, U.S.
- Occupations: Photographer, ethnologist
- Spouse: Clara J. Phillips (1874–1932)
- Children: Harold Phillips Curtis (1893–1988); Elizabeth M. Curtis Magnuson (1896–1973); Florence Curtis Graybill (1899–1987); Katherine Shirley Curtis Ingram (1909–1982)
- Parent(s): Ellen Sherriff (1844–1912); Johnson Asahel Curtis (1840–87)

Edward Sherriff Curtis (February 19, 1868 – October 19, 1952; sometimes incorrectly spelled as Edward Sheriff Curtis) was an American photographer and ethnologist whose work focused on the American West and Native American people. Sometimes referred to as the "Shadow Catcher", Curtis traveled the United States to document and record what he believed to be the dwindling ways of life of various Native tribes through photographs and audio recordings.

== Early life ==
Edward Sherriff Curtis was born on February 19, 1868, on a farm in the Town of Cold Spring north of Whitewater, Wisconsin. His father, Reverend Ashen "Johnson" Curtis (1840–1887), was a minister, farmer, and American Civil War veteran born in Ohio. His mother, Ellen Sherriff (1844–1912), was born in Pennsylvania. Curtis's siblings were Raphael, also called Ray; Edward, called Eddy; Eva; and Asahel Curtis. Weakened by his experiences in the Civil War, Johnson Curtis had difficulty in managing his farm, resulting in hardship and poverty for his family.

Around 1874, the family moved from Wisconsin to Minnesota to join Johnson Curtis's father, Asahel Curtis, who ran a grocery store and was a postmaster in Le Sueur County. Curtis left school in the sixth grade and soon built his own camera.

== Career ==
=== Early career ===
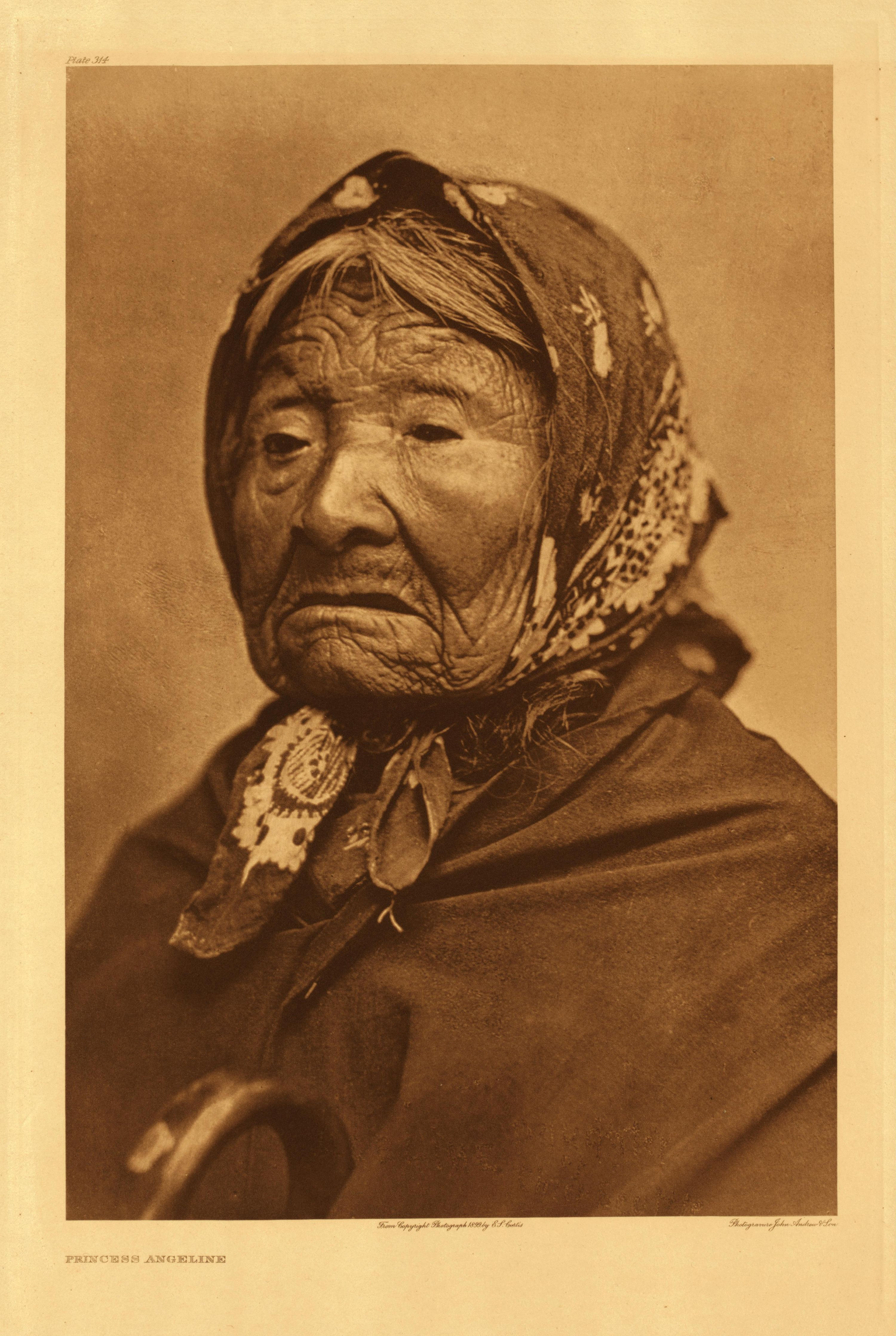
Princess Angeline (Duwamish) in an 1896 photogravure by Curtis

In 1885, at 17, Curtis became an apprentice photographer in St. Paul, Minnesota. In 1887 the family moved to Seattle, Washington, where he purchased a new camera and became a partner with Rasmus Rothi in an existing photographic studio. Curtis paid $150 ($5,375 in 2025) for his 50% share in the studio. After about six months, he left Rothi and formed a new partnership with Thomas Guptill. They established a new studio, Curtis and Guptill, Photographers and Photoengravers.

In 1895, Curtis met and photographed Princess Angeline, also known as Kickisomlo, the daughter of Chief Seattle. This was his first portrait of a Native American. In 1898, three of Curtis's images were chosen for an exhibition sponsored by the National Photographic Society. Two were images of Princess Angeline, "The Mussel Gatherer" and "The Clam Digger". The other was of Puget Sound, entitled "Homeward", which was awarded the exhibition's grand prize and a gold medal. In that same year, while photographing Mount Rainier, Curtis came upon a small group of scientists who were lost and in need of direction. One of them was George Bird Grinnell, considered an "expert" on Native Americans by his peers. Curtis was appointed the official photographer of the Harriman Alaska Expedition of 1899, probably as a result of his friendship with Grinnell. Having very little formal education Curtis learned much during the lectures that were given aboard the ship each evening of the voyage. Grinnell became interested in Curtis's photography and invited him to join an expedition to photograph people of the Blackfoot Confederacy in Montana in 1900.

=== The North American Indian ===
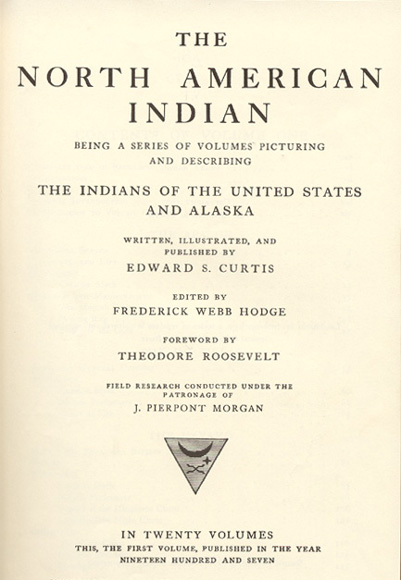
The North American Indian, volume 1, 1907

In 1906, after seeking an introduction through Belle de Costa Greene, and with her approval, J. P. Morgan provided Curtis with $75,000 ($2.69 million in 2025) to produce a series on Native Americans. This work was to be in 20 volumes with 1,500 photographs. Morgan's funds were to be disbursed over five years and were earmarked to support only fieldwork for the books, not for writing, editing, or production of the volumes. Curtis received no salary for the project, which was to last more than 20 years. Under the terms of the arrangement, Morgan was to receive 25 sets and 500 original prints as repayment.

Once Curtis had secured funding for the project, he hired several employees to help him. For writing and for recording Native American languages, he hired a former journalist, William E. Myers. For general assistance with logistics and fieldwork, he hired Bill Phillips, a graduate of the University of Washington and Alexander B. Upshaw, a member of the Apsáalooke tribe. Frederick Webb Hodge, an anthropologist employed by the Smithsonian Institution, was hired to edit the series, based on his experience researching and documenting Native American people and culture in the southwestern United States.

Eventually, 222 complete sets of photographs were published. Curtis's goal was to document Native American life, pre-colonization. He wrote in the introduction to his first volume in 1907, "The information that is to be gathered ... respecting the mode of life of one of the great races of mankind, must be collected at once or the opportunity will be lost." Curtis made over 10,000 wax cylinder recordings of Native American language and music. He took over 40,000 photographs of members of over 80 tribes. He recorded tribal lore and history, described traditional foods, housing, garments, recreation, ceremonies, and funeral customs. He wrote biographical sketches of tribal leaders. His work was exhibited at the Rencontres d'Arles festival in France in 1973.

=== In the Land of the Head Hunters ===
Curtis had been using motion picture cameras in fieldwork for The North American Indian since 1906. He worked extensively with the ethnographer and British Columbia native George Hunt in 1910, which inspired his work with the Kwakwakaʼwakw, though much of their collaboration remains unpublished. At the end of 1912, Curtis decided to create a feature film depicting Native American life, partly as a way of improving his financial situation, and partly because film technology had improved to the point where it was conceivable to create and screen films more than a few minutes long. Curtis chose the Kwakwakaʼwakw, of the Queen Charlotte Strait region of the Central Coast of British Columbia, Canada, for his subject. His film, In the Land of the Head Hunters, was the first feature-length film whose cast was composed entirely of Indigenous North Americans.

In the Land of the Head-Hunters premiered simultaneously at the Casino Theatre in New York and the Moore Theatre in Seattle on December 7, 1914. The silent film was accompanied by a score composed by John J. Braham, a musical theater composer who had also worked with Gilbert and Sullivan. The film was praised by critics but made only $3,269.18 ($105,081 in 2025) in its initial run. It was however criticized by ethnographic community for its lack of authenticity. The Kwakwakaʼwakw cast was not only dressed up by the movie director himself but the plot was enriched with exaggerated elements falsifying the reality.

=== Later years ===
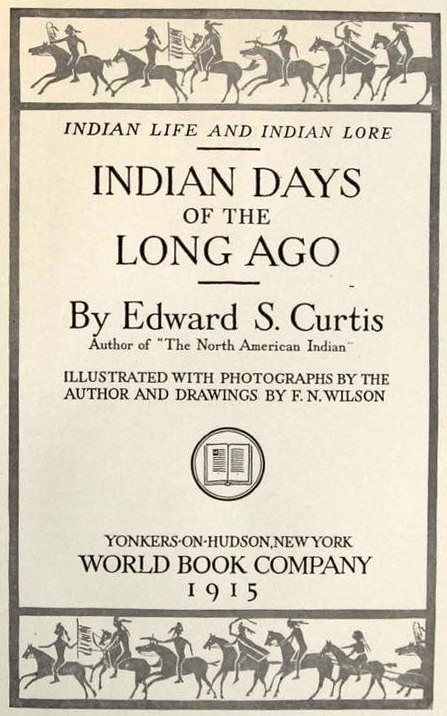
Indian Days of the Long Ago, 1915

The photographer Ella E. McBride assisted Curtis in his studio beginning in 1907 and became a friend of the family. She made an unsuccessful attempt to purchase the studio with Curtis's daughter Beth in 1916, the year of Curtis's divorce, and left to open her own studio.

Around 1922, Curtis moved to Los Angeles with Beth and opened a new photo studio. To earn money he worked as an assistant cameraman for Cecil B. DeMille and was an uncredited assistant cameraman in the 1923 filming of The Ten Commandments. On October 16, 1924, Curtis sold the rights to In the Land of the Head-Hunters, including the master print and the original camera negative, to the American Museum of Natural History for $1,500 ($28,180 in 2025). It had cost him over $20,000 to create the film.

In 1927, after returning from Alaska to Seattle with Beth, Curtis was arrested for failure to pay alimony over the preceding seven years. The total owed was $4,500, but the charges were dropped. For Christmas of 1927, the family was reunited at the home of his daughter Florence in Medford, Oregon. This was the first time since the divorce that Curtis was with all of his children at the same time, and it had been 13 years since he had seen Katherine.

In 1928, desperate for cash, Curtis sold the rights to his project to J. P. Morgan Jr. The concluding volume of The North American Indian was published in 1930. In total, about 280 sets were sold of his now completed masterpiece.

In 1930, his ex-wife Clara was still living in Seattle operating the photo studio with their daughter Katherine. His other daughter, Florence Curtis, was still living in Medford, Oregon, with her husband, Henry Graybill. After Clara died of heart failure in 1932, his daughter Katherine moved to California to be closer to her father and Beth.

=== Loss of rights to The North American Indian ===
In 1935, the Morgan estate sold the rights to The North American Indian and remaining unpublished material to the Charles E. Lauriat Company in Boston for $1,000.00 plus a percentage of any future royalties. This included 19 complete bound sets of The North American Indian, thousands of individual paper prints, the copper printing plates, the unbound printed pages, and the original glass-plate negatives. Lauriat bound the remaining loose printed pages and sold them with the completed sets. The remaining material remained untouched in the Lauriat basement in Boston until they were rediscovered in 1972.

== Personal life ==
=== Marriage and divorce ===
In 1892, Curtis married Clara J. Phillips (1874–1932), who was born in Pennsylvania to Canadian parents. Together they had four children: Harold (1893–1988); Elizabeth M. (Beth) (1896–1973), who married Manford E. Magnuson (1895–1993); Florence (1899–1987), who married Henry Graybill (1893–?); and Katherine Shirley ("Billy") (1909–1982), who married Ray Conger Ingram (1900–1954).

In 1896, the family moved to a new house in Seattle. The household then included Curtis's mother, Ellen Sherriff; his sister, Eva Curtis; his brother, Asahel Curtis; Clara's sisters, Susie and Nellie Phillips; and their cousin, William.

During the years of work on The North American Indian, Curtis was often absent from home for most of the year, leaving Clara to manage the children and the studio by herself. After several years of estrangement, Clara filed for divorce on October 16, 1916. In 1919 she was granted the divorce and received Curtis's photographic studio and all of his original camera negatives as her part of the settlement. Curtis and his daughter Beth went to the studio and destroyed all of his original glass negatives, rather than have them become the property of his ex-wife. Clara went on to manage the Curtis studio with her sister Nellie (1880–?), who was married to Martin Lucus (1880–?). Following the divorce, the two oldest daughters, Beth and Florence, remained in Seattle, living in a boarding house separate from their mother. The youngest daughter, Katherine, lived with Clara in Charleston, Kitsap County, Washington.

=== Death ===
On October 19, 1952, at the age of 84, Curtis died of a heart attack in Los Angeles, California, in the home of his daughter Beth. He was buried at Forest Lawn Memorial Park in Glendale, California. A brief obituary appeared in The New York Times on October 20, 1952:

Edward S. Curtis, internationally known authority on the history of the North American Indian, died today at the home of a daughter, Mrs. Beth Magnuson. His age was 84. Mr. Curtis devoted his life to compiling Indian history. His research was done under the patronage of the late financier, J. Pierpont Morgan. The foreward [sic] for the monumental set of Curtis books was written by President Theodore Roosevelt. Mr. Curtis was also widely known as a photographer.

== Collections of Curtis materials ==
=== Northwestern University ===
The entire 20 volumes of narrative text and photogravure images for each volume are online. Each volume is accompanied by a portfolio of large photogravure plates. The online publishing was supported largely by funds from the Institute for Museum and Library Services.

=== Library of Congress ===
The Prints and Photographs Division Curtis collection consists of more than 2,400 silver-gelatin, first-generation photographic prints – some of which are sepia-toned – made from Curtis's original glass negatives. Most are 5 by 7 inches (13 cm × 18 cm) although nearly 100 are 11 by 14 inches (28 cm × 36 cm) and larger; many include the Curtis file or negative number in the lower left-hand corner of the image.

The Library of Congress acquired these images as copyright deposits from about 1900 through 1930. The dates on them are dates of registration, not the dates when the photographs were taken. About two-thirds (1,608) of these images were not published in The North American Indian and therefore offer a different glimpse into Curtis's work with indigenous cultures. The original glass plate negatives, which had been stored and nearly forgotten in the basement of the Morgan Library, in New York, were dispersed during World War II. Many others were destroyed and some were sold as junk.

=== Charles Lauriat archive ===
Around 1970, David Padwa, of Santa Fe, New Mexico, went to Boston to search for Curtis's original copper plates and photogravures at the Charles E. Lauriat rare bookstore. He discovered almost 285,000 original photogravures as well as all the copper plates and purchased the entire collection which he then shared with Jack Loeffler and Karl Kernberger. They jointly disposed of the surviving Curtis material that was owned by Charles Emelius Lauriat (1874–1937). The collection was later purchased by another group of investors led by Mark Zaplin, of Santa Fe. The Zaplin Group owned the plates until 1982, when they sold them to a California group led by Kenneth Zerbe, the owner of the plates as of 2005. Other glass and nitrate negatives from this set are at the Palace of the Governors Photo Archives in Santa Fe, New Mexico).

=== Peabody Essex Museum ===
Charles Goddard Weld purchased 110 prints that Curtis had made for his 1905–06 exhibit and donated them to the Peabody Essex Museum, where they remain. The 14" by 17" prints are each unique and remain in pristine condition. Clark Worswick, curator of photography for the museum, describes them as:

... Curtis' most carefully selected prints of what was then his life's work ... certainly these are some of the most glorious prints ever made in the history of the photographic medium. The fact that we have this man's entire show of 1906 is one of the minor miracles of photography and museology.

=== Indiana University ===
Two hundred seventy-six of the wax cylinders made by Curtis between 1907 and 1913 are held by the Archives of Traditional Music at Indiana University. These include recordings of music of the following Native American groups: Clayoquot, Cowichan, Haida, Hesquiaht, and Kwakwakaʼwakw, in British Columbia; and Arapaho, Cheyenne, Cochiti, Crow, Klickitat, Kutenai, Nez Percé, Salish, Shoshone, Snohomish, Wishram, Yakima, Acoma, Arikara, Hidatsa, Makah, Mandan, Paloos, Piegan, Tewa (San Ildefonso, San Juan, Tesuque, Nambé), and possibly Dakota, Clallam, Twana, Colville and Nespelem in the western United States.

=== University of Wyoming ===
Toppan Rare Books Library at the University of Wyoming in Laramie, Wyoming, holds the entire 20 volume set of narrative texts and photogravure images that make up The North American Indian. Each volume of text is accompanied by a portfolio of large photogravure plates.

== Legacy ==
=== Revival of interest ===
Though Curtis was largely forgotten at the time of his death, interest in his work revived and continues to this day. Casting him as a precursor in visual anthropology, Harald E.L. Prins reviewed his oeuvre in the journal American Anthropologist and noted: "Appealing to his society's infatuation with romantic primitivism, Curtis portrayed American Indians to conform to the cultural archetype of the "vanishing Indian". Elaborated since the 1820s, this ideological construct effectively captured the ambivalent racism of Anglo-American society, which repressed Native spirituality and traditional customs while creating cultural space for the invented Indian of romantic imagination. [Since the 1960s,] Curtis's sepia-toned photographs (in which material evidence of Western civilization has often been erased) had special appeal for this 'Red Power' movement and even helped inspire it." Major exhibitions of his photographs were presented at the Morgan Library & Museum (1971), the Philadelphia Museum of Art (1972), and the University of California, Irvine (1976). His work was also featured in several anthologies on Native American photography published in the early 1970s. Original printings of The North American Indian began to fetch high prices at auction. In 1972, a complete set sold for $20,000. Five years later, another set was auctioned for $60,500. The revival of interest in Curtis's work can be seen as part of the increased attention to Native American issues during this period.

In 2017 Curtis was inducted into the International Photography Hall of Fame and Museum.

=== Critical reception ===
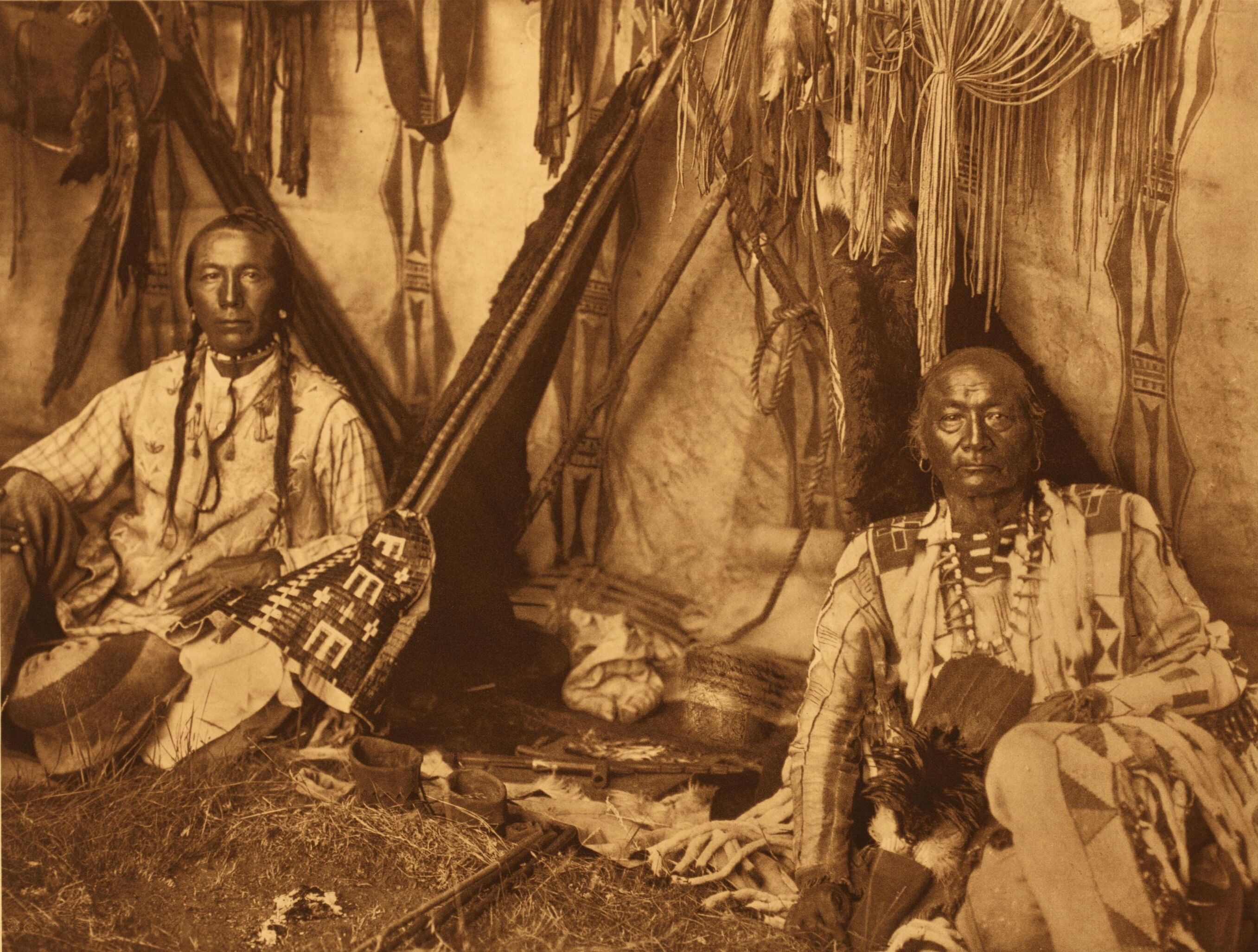
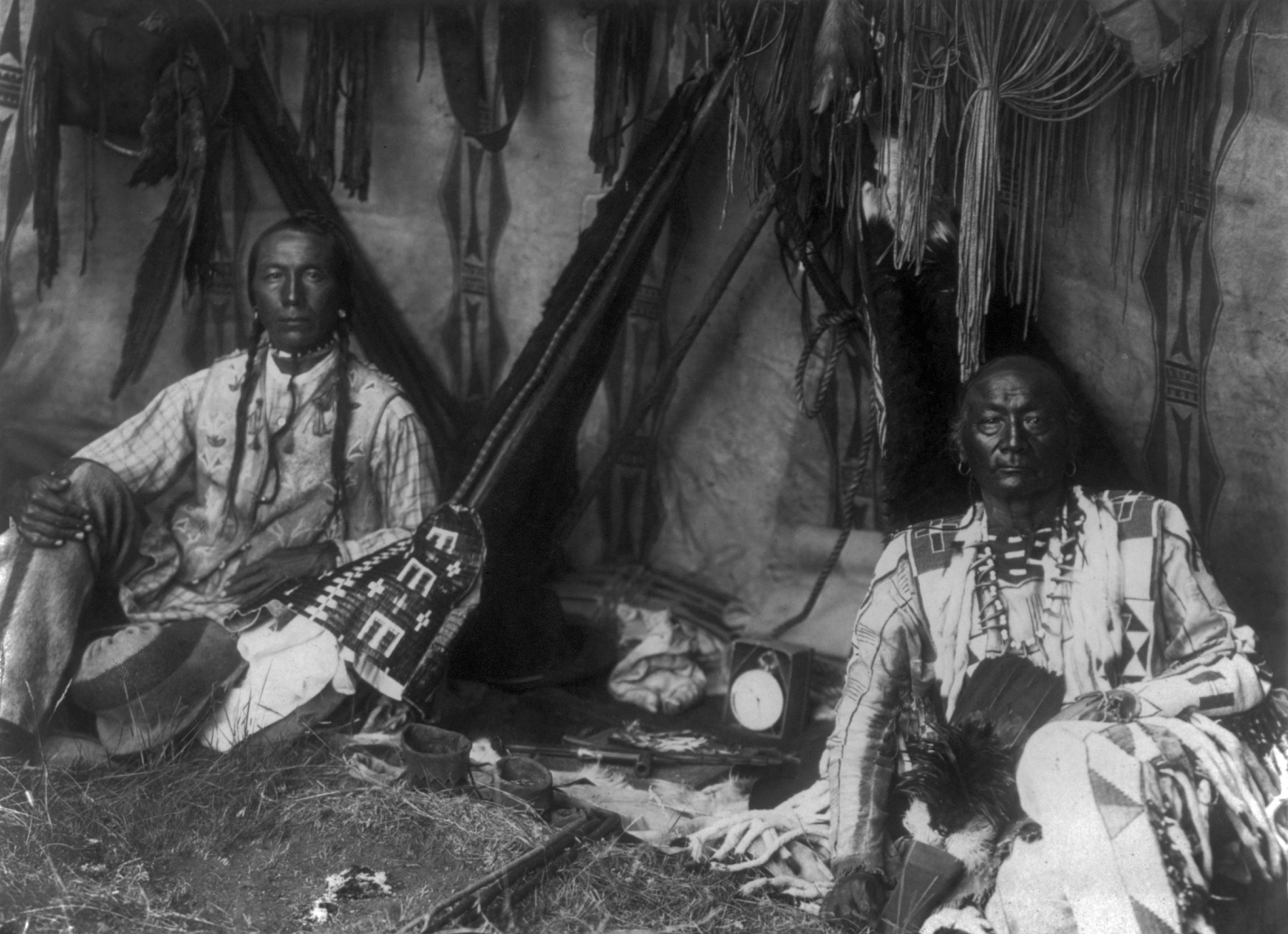
Little Plume, with his son Yellow Kidney, occupies the position of honor, the space at the rear opposite the entrance. Compare with the unretouched original (below), which has a clock between Little Plume and Yellow Kidney.

A representative evaluation of The North American Indian is that of Mick Gidley, Emeritus Professor of American Literature, at Leeds University, in England, who has written a number of works related to the life of Curtis:

The North American Indian—extensively produced and issued in a severely limited edition—could not prove popular. But in recent years anthropologists and others, even when they have censured what they have assumed were Curtis' methodological assumptions or quarrelled with the text's conclusions, have begun to appreciate the value of the project's achievement: exhibitions have been mounted, anthologies of pictures have been published, and The North American Indian has increasingly been cited in the researches of others ... The North American Indian is not monolithic or merely a monument. It is alive, it speaks, if with several voices, and among those perhaps mingled voices are those of otherwise silent or muted Indian individuals.

Of the full Curtis opus N. Scott Momaday wrote, "Taken as a whole, the work of Edward S. Curtis is a singular achievement. Never before have we seen the Indians of North America so close to the origins of their humanity ... Curtis' photographs comprehend indispensable images of every human being at every time in every place"

In Shadow Catcher: The Life and Work of Edward S. Curtis, Laurie Lawlor commented that

many Native Americans Curtis photographed called him Shadow Catcher. But the images he captured were far more powerful than mere shadows. The men, women, and children in The North American Indian seem as alive to us today as they did when Curtis took their pictures in the early part of the twentieth century. Curtis respected the Native Americans he encountered and was willing to learn about their culture, religion and way of life. In return the Native Americans respected and trusted him. When judged by the standards of his time, Curtis was far ahead of his contemporaries in sensitivity, tolerance, and openness to Native American cultures and ways of thinking.

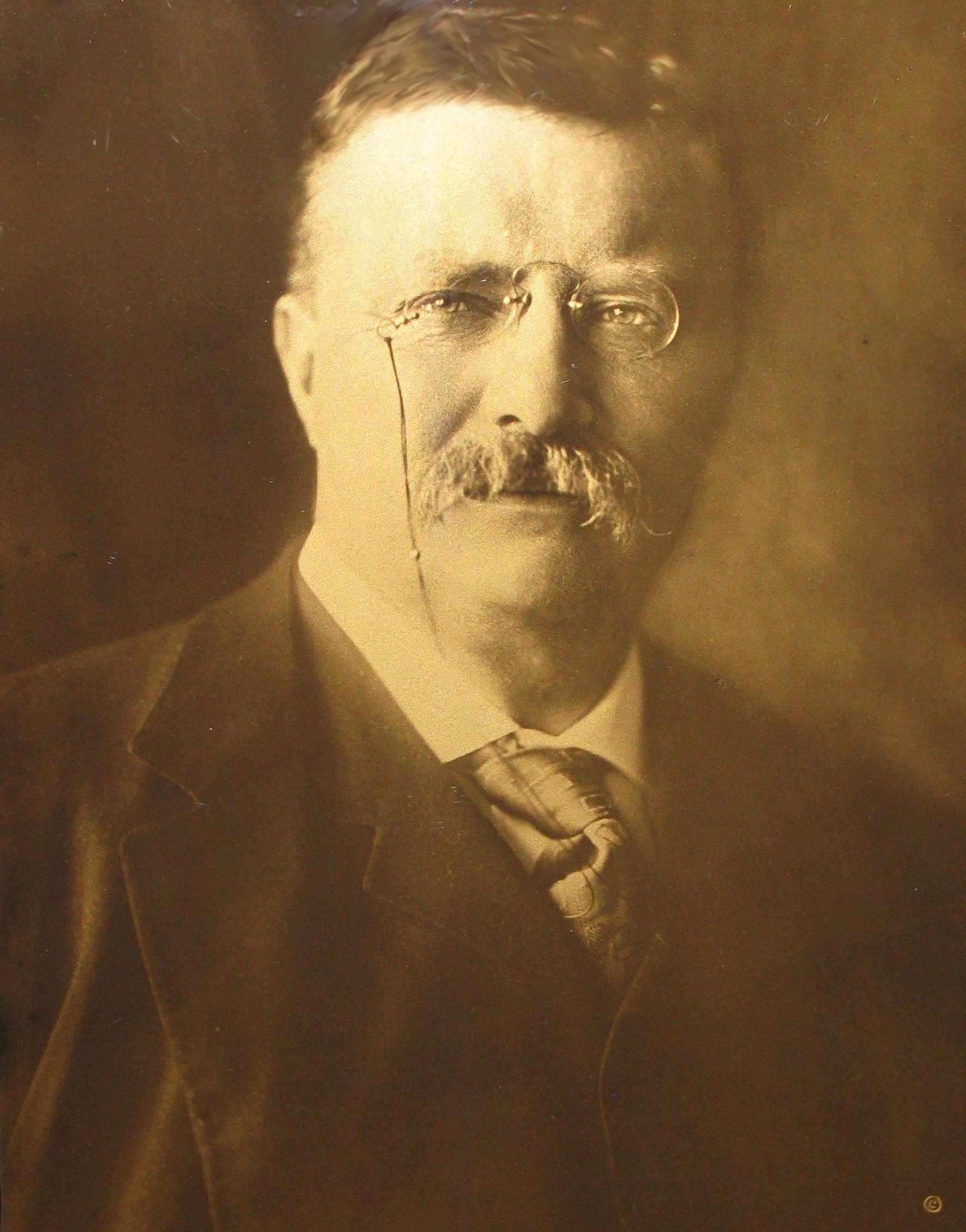
U.S. President Theodore Roosevelt, 1904, orotone by Curtis

Theodore Roosevelt, a contemporary of Curtis's and one of his most fervent supporters, wrote the following comments in the foreword to Volume 1 of The North American Indian:

In Mr. Curtis we have both an artist and a trained observer, whose work has far more than mere accuracy, because it is truthful. ... because of his extraordinary success in making and using his opportunities, has been able to do what no other man ever has done; what, as far as we can see, no other man could do. Mr. Curtis in publishing this book is rendering a real and great service; a service not only to our own people, but to the world of scholarship everywhere.

— Theodore Roosevelt

Curtis has been praised as a gifted photographer but also criticized by some contemporary ethnologists for manipulating his images. Although the early twentieth century was a difficult time for most Native communities in America, not all natives were doomed to becoming a "vanishing race." At a time when natives' rights were being denied and their treaties were unrecognized by the federal government, many natives were successfully adapting to Western society. By reinforcing the native identity as the noble savage and a tragic vanishing race, some believe Curtis deflected attention from the true plight of American natives. At the time when he was witnessing their squalid conditions on reservations first-hand, some were attempting to find their place in and adapt to mainstream U.S. culture and its economy, while others were actively resisting it.

In his photogravure In a Piegan Lodge, published in The North American Indian, Curtis retouched the image to remove a clock between the two men seated on the ground.

He is also known to have paid natives to pose in staged scenes or dance and partake in simulated ceremonies. His models were paid in silver dollars, beef and autographed photos. For instance, one of his first subjects, Princess Angeline, was paid a dollar a photo.

Curtis paid natives to pose at a time when they lived with little dignity and enjoyed few rights and freedoms. It has been suggested that he altered and manipulated his pictures to create an ethnographic, romanticized simulation of native tribes untouched by Western society.

== Image gallery ==
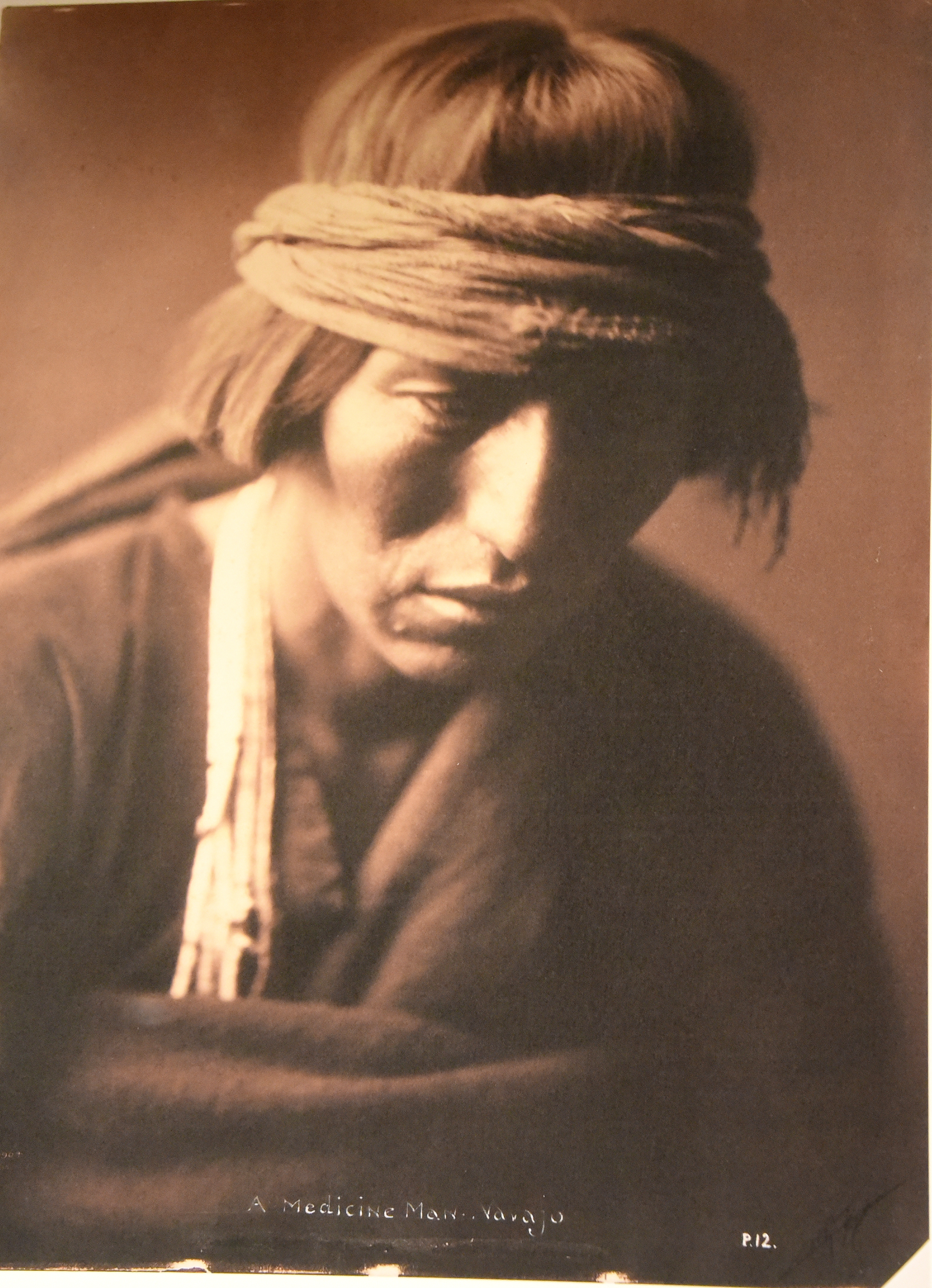
A Navajo medicine man, 1900

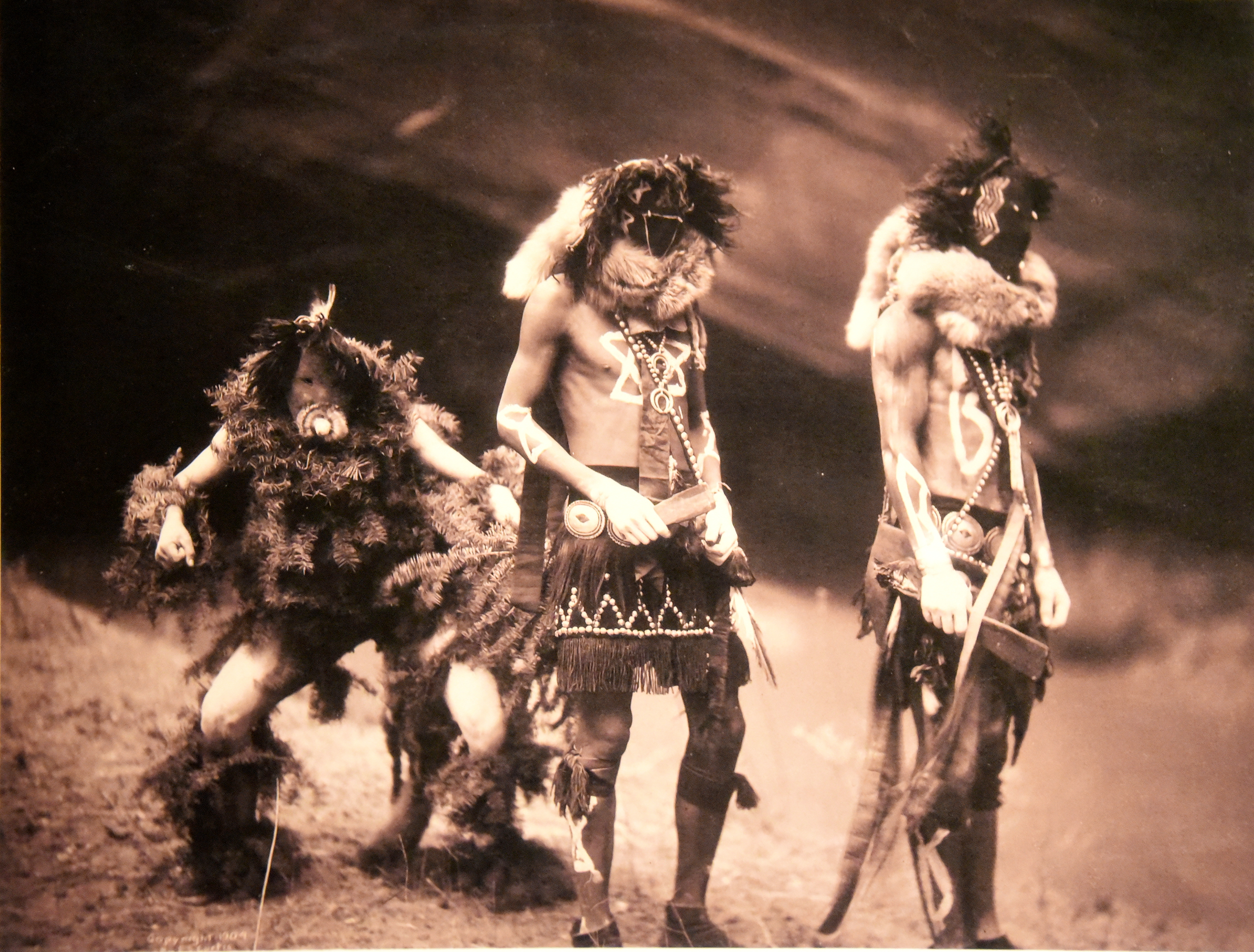
Navajo Yebichai (Yei Bi Chei) dancers, 1900

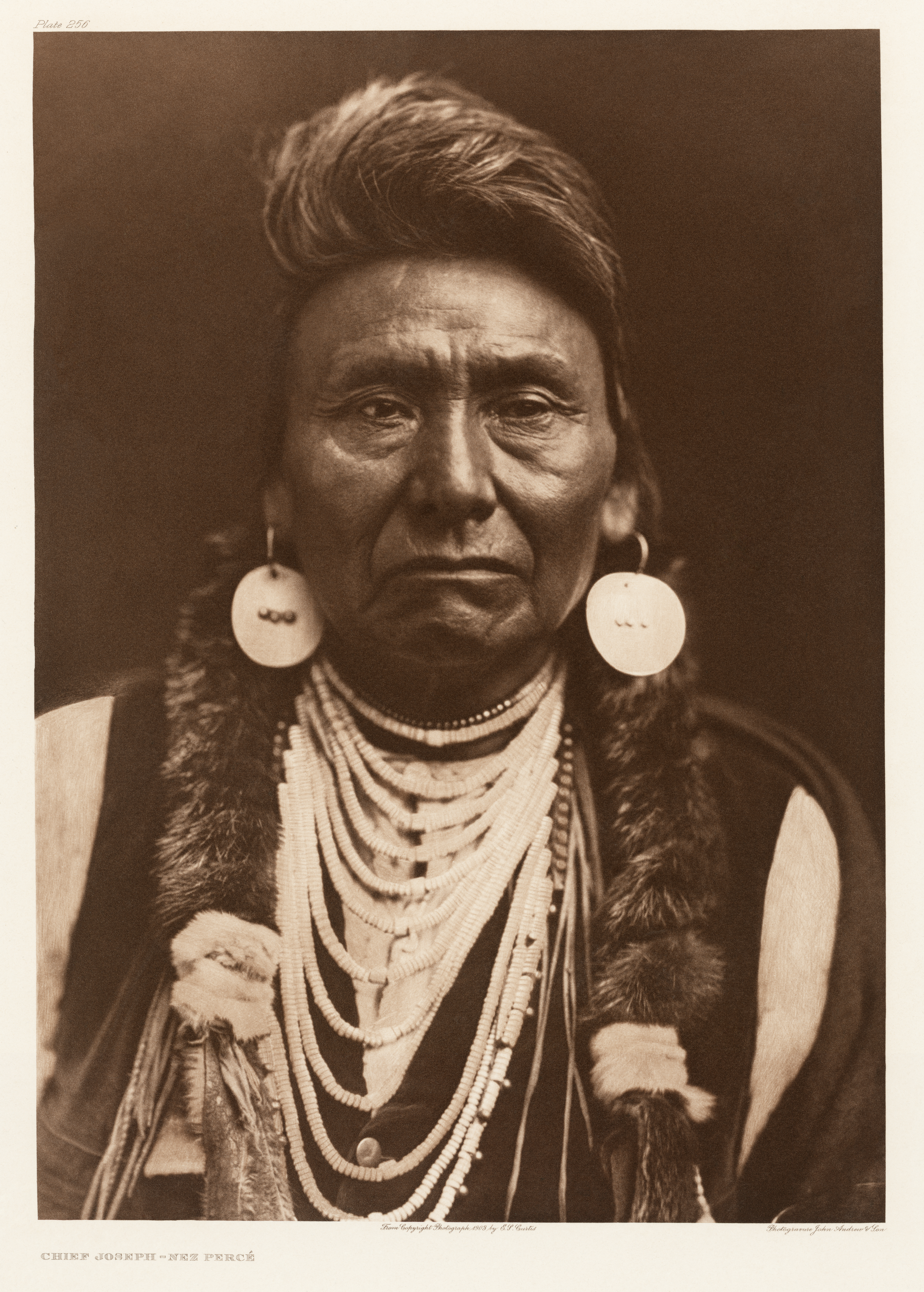
Chief Joseph in 1903.

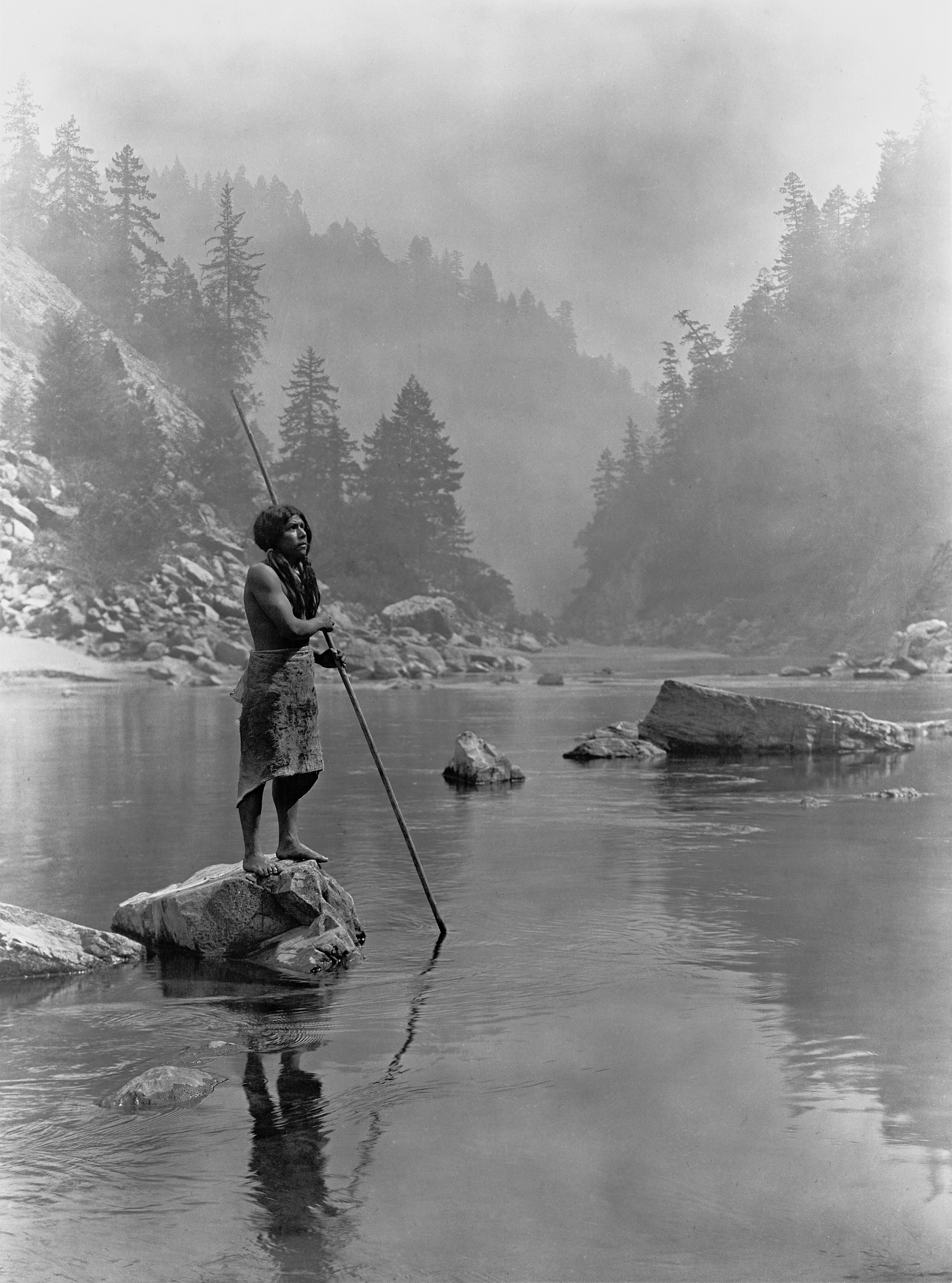
A smoky day at the Sugar Bowl—Hupa, c. 1923

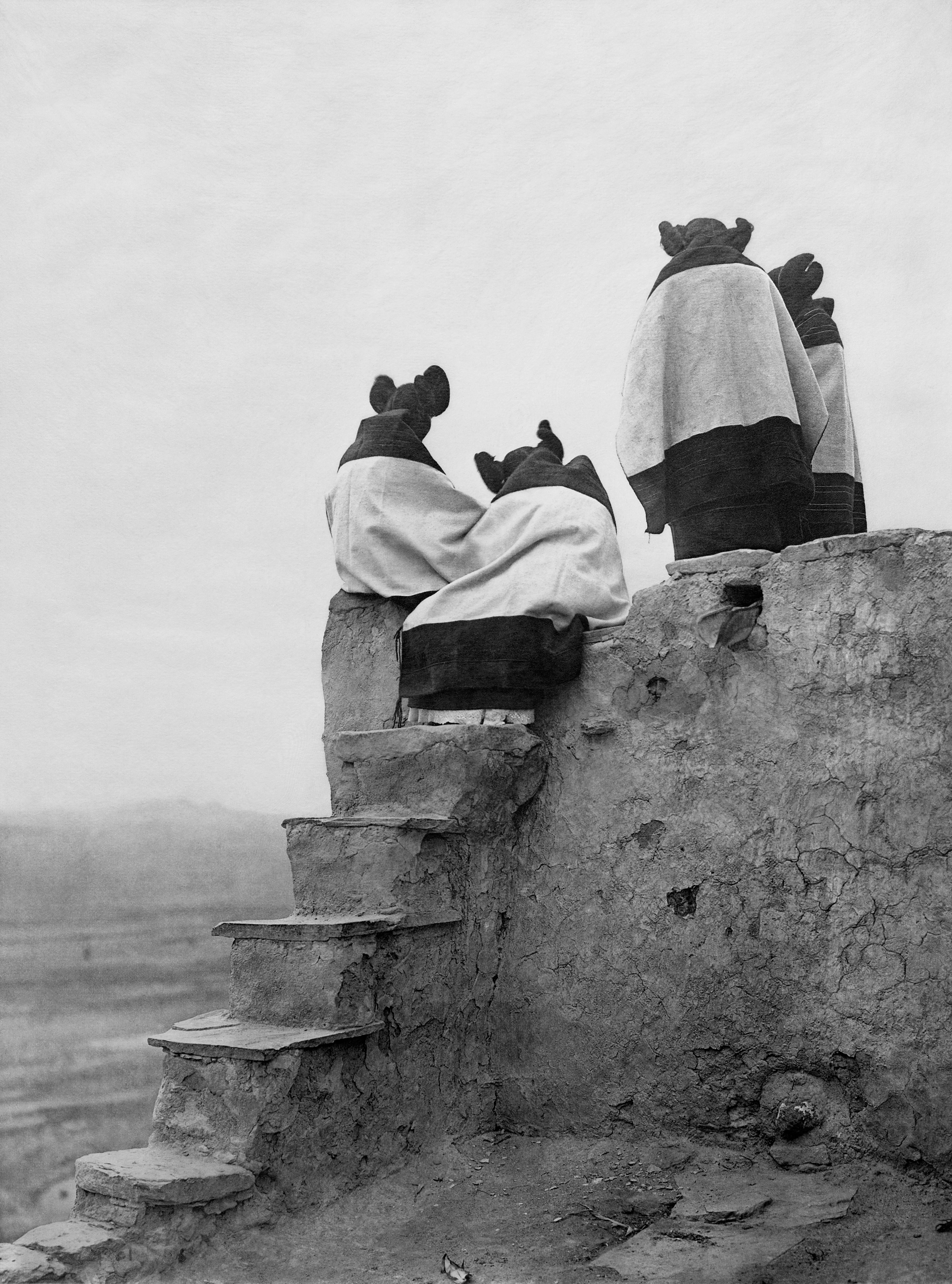
Watching the Dancers, 1906

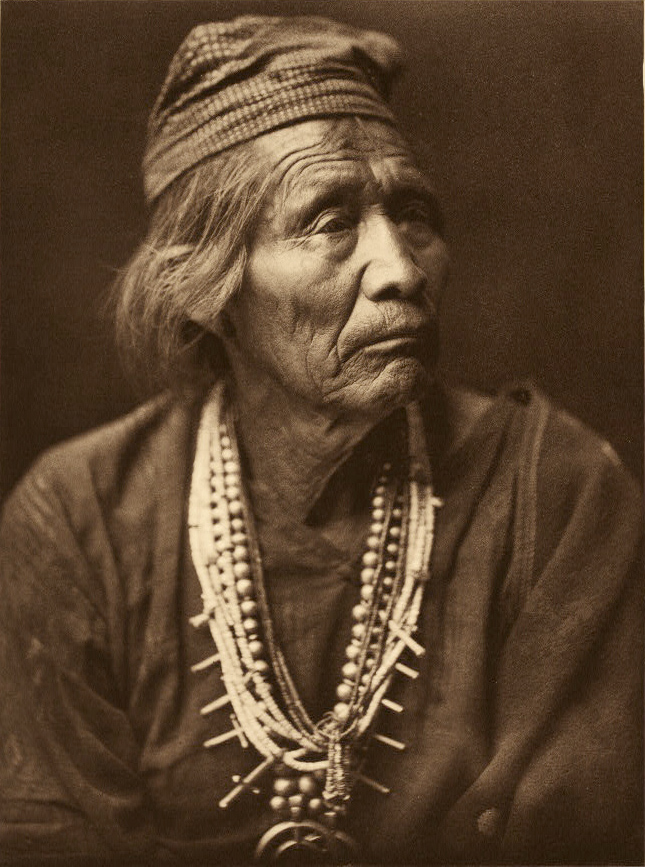
Navajo medicine man – Nesjaja Hatali, c. 1907

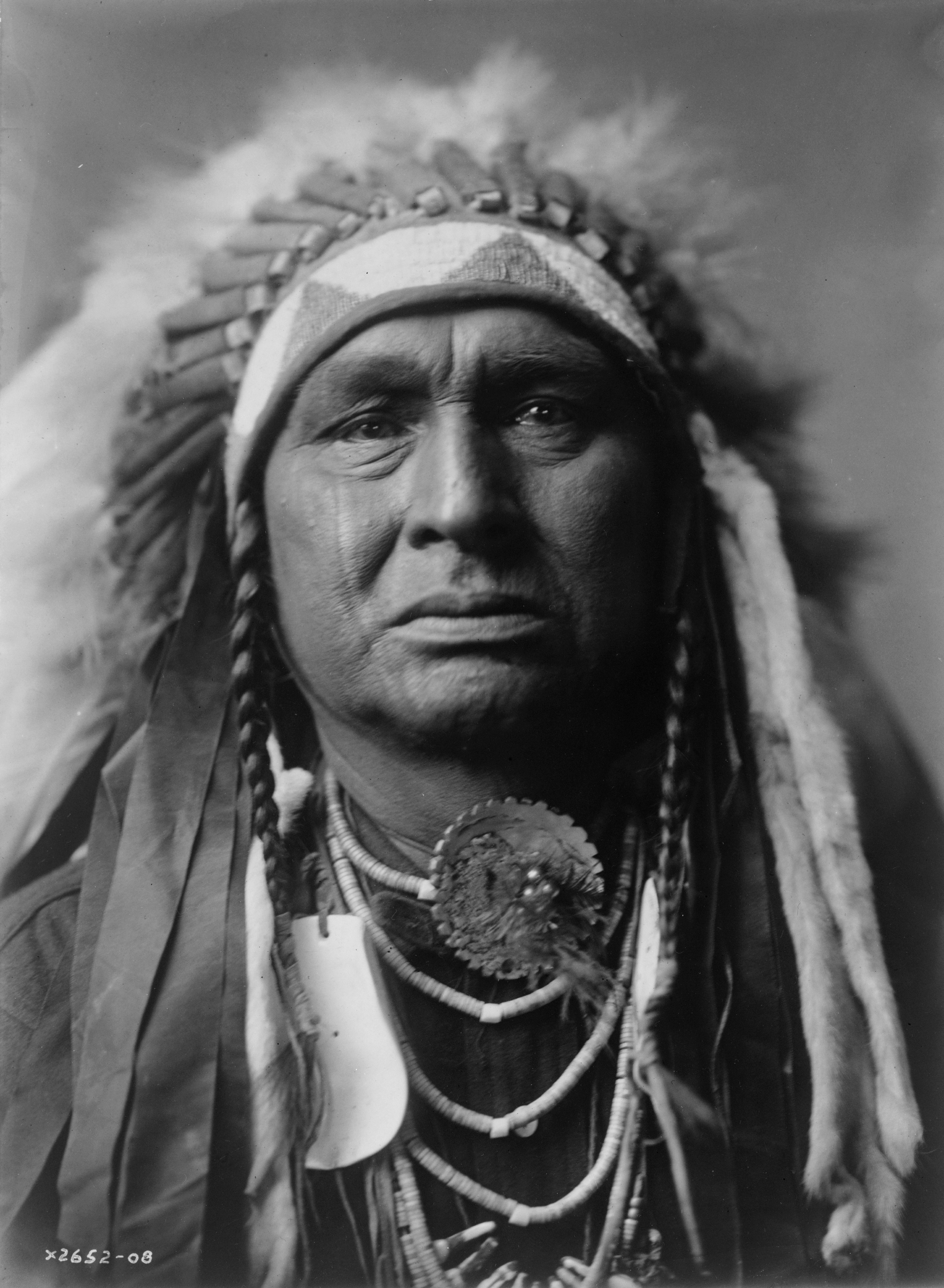
White Man Runs Him, c. 1908. Crow scout serving with George Armstrong Custer's 1876 expeditions against the Sioux and Northern Cheyenne that culminated in the Battle of the Little Bighorn.

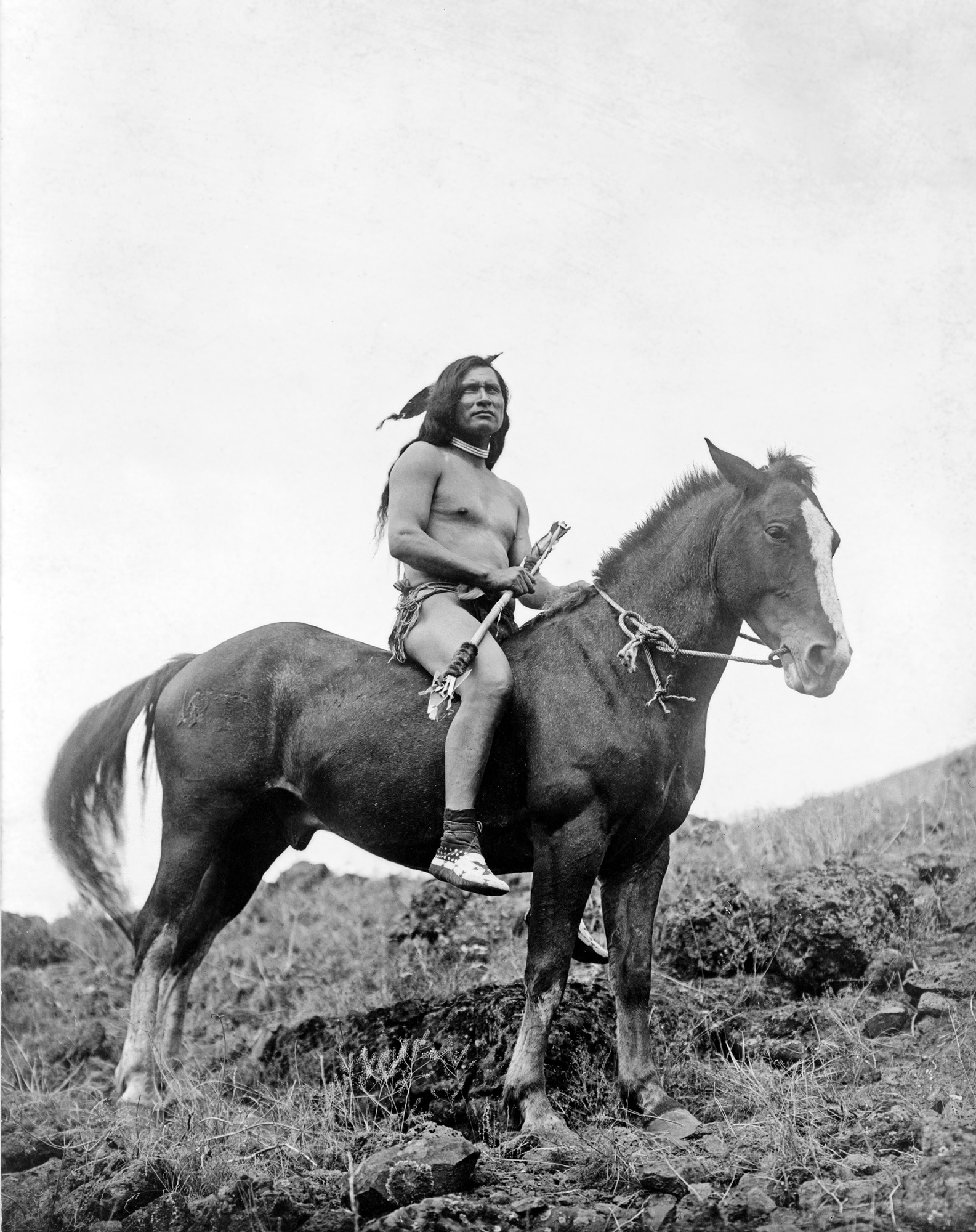
The old-time warrior: Nez Percé, c. 1910. Nez Percé man, wearing loin cloth and moccasins, on horseback.

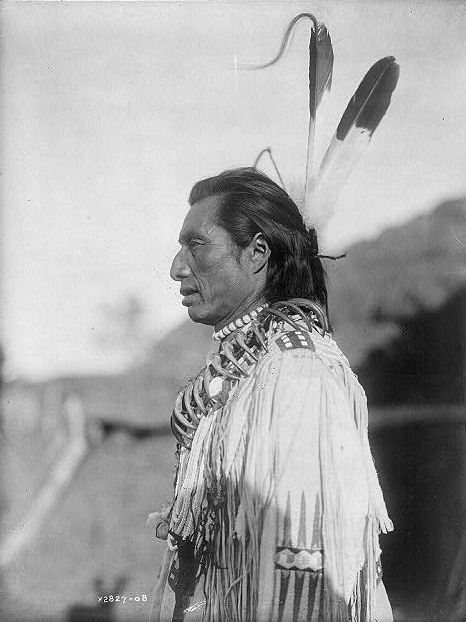
Crow's Heart, Mandan, c. 1908

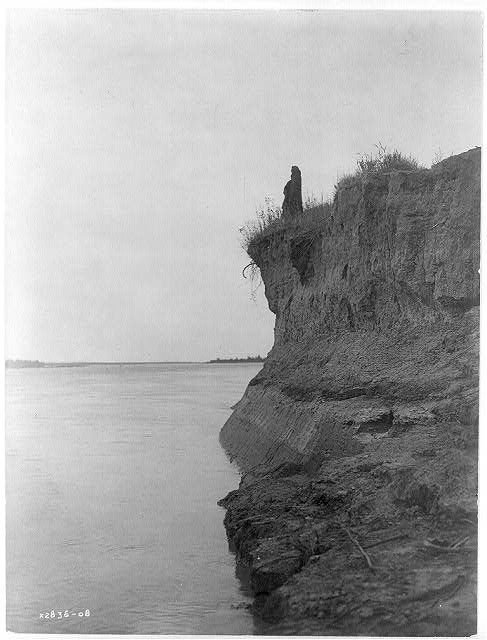
Mandan man overlooking the Missouri River, c. 1908

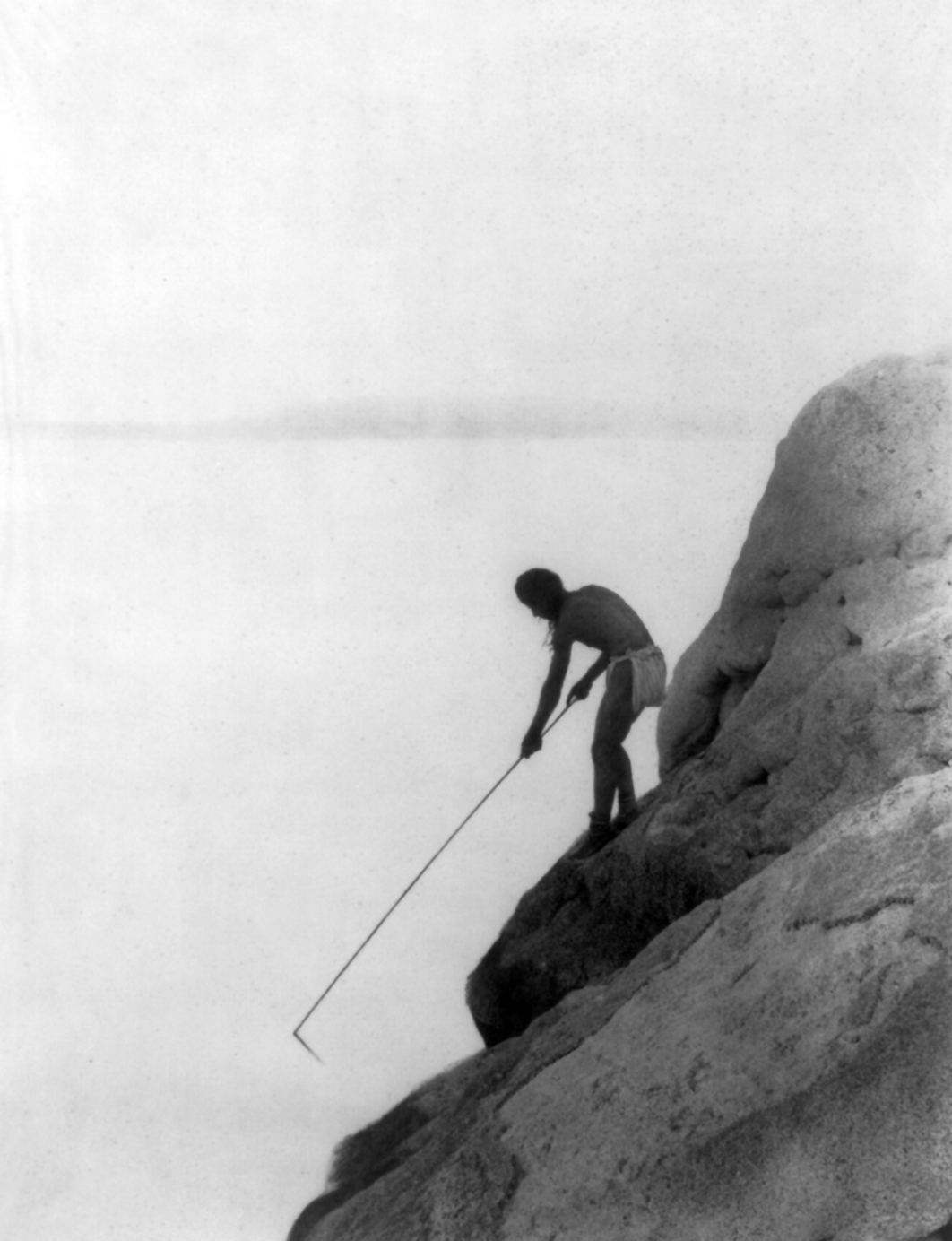
Fishing with a Gaff-hook—Paviotso or Paiute, c. 1924

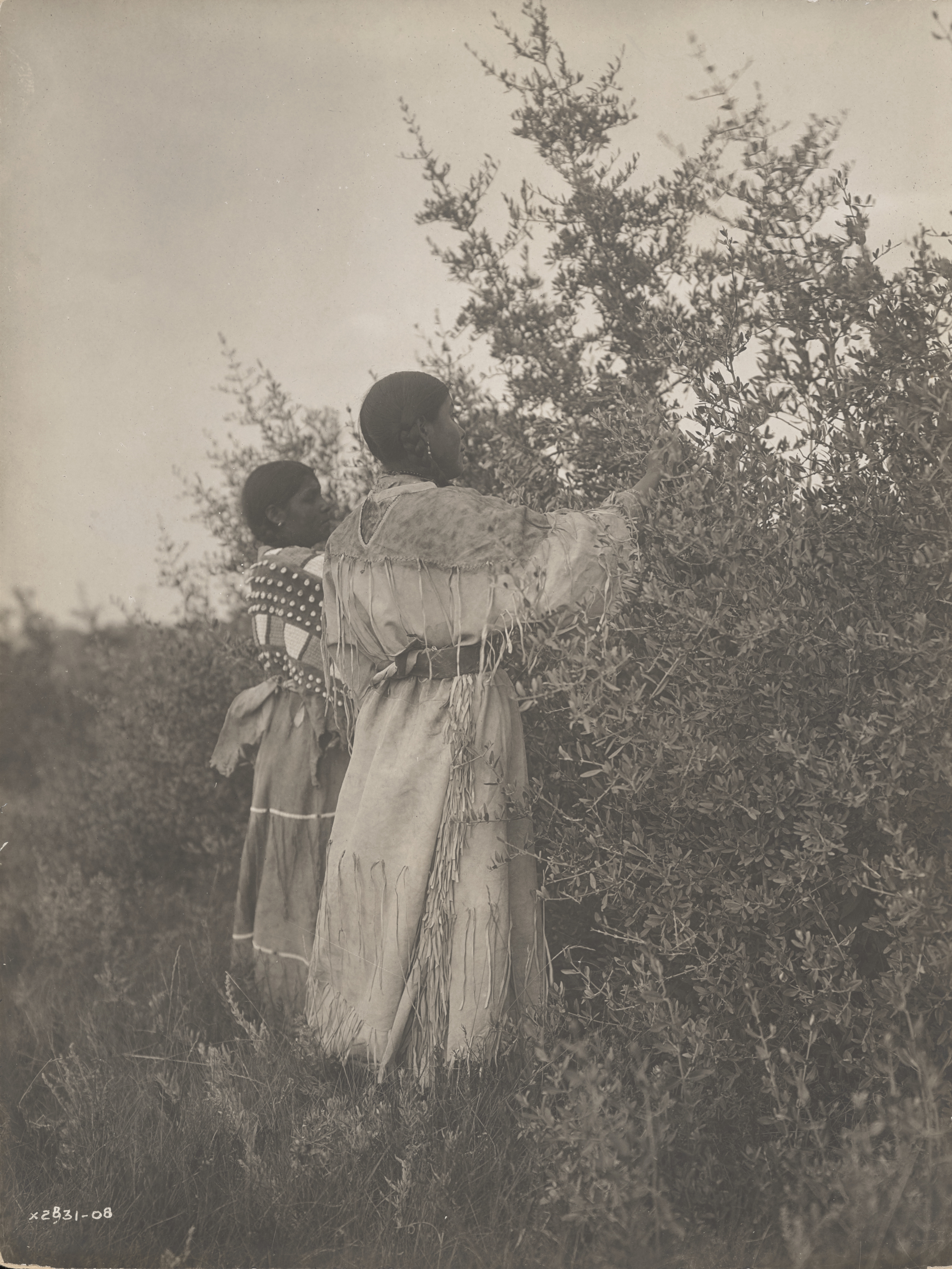
Mandan girls gathering berries, c. 1908

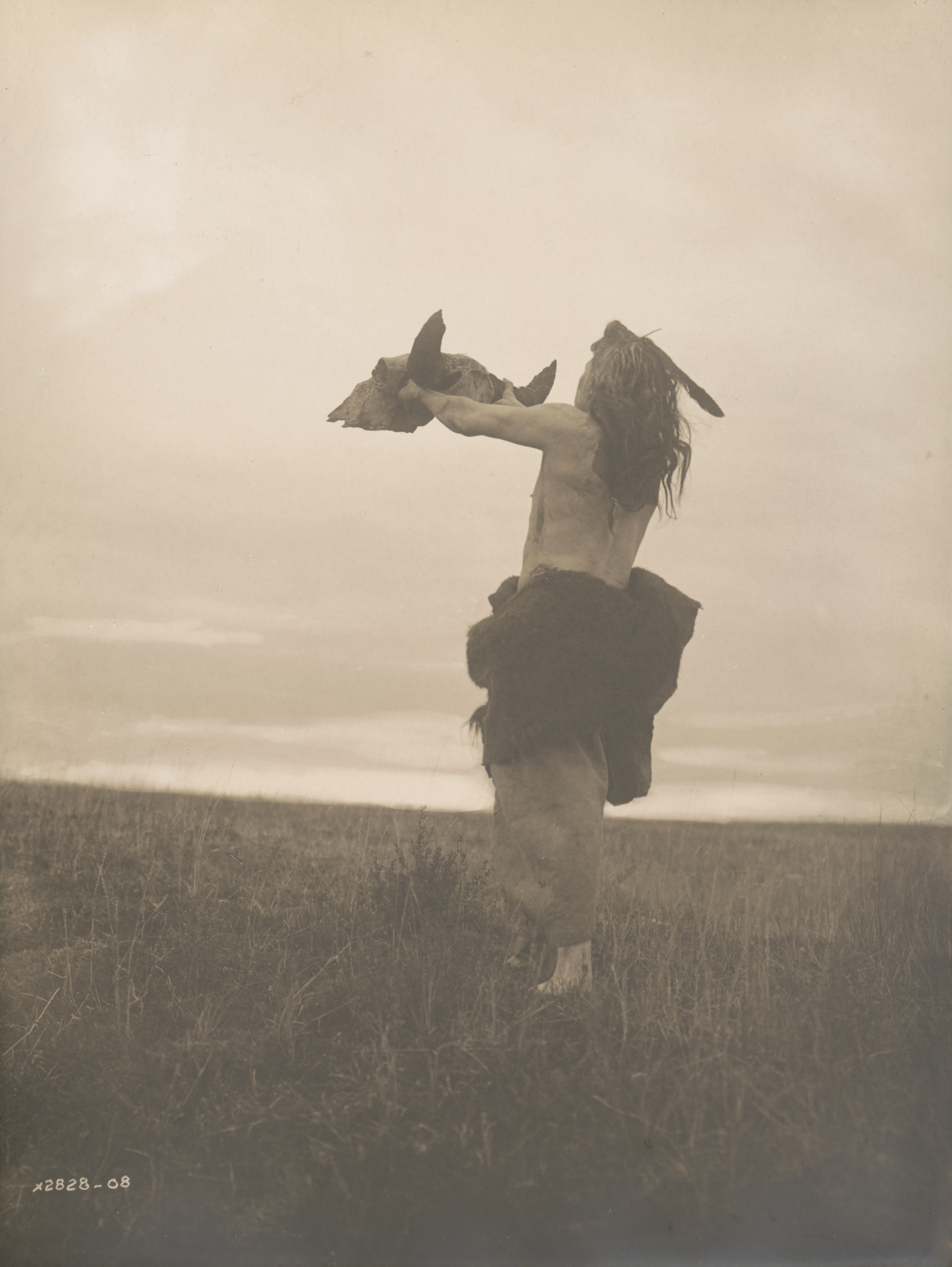
Mandan hunter with buffalo skull, c. 1909

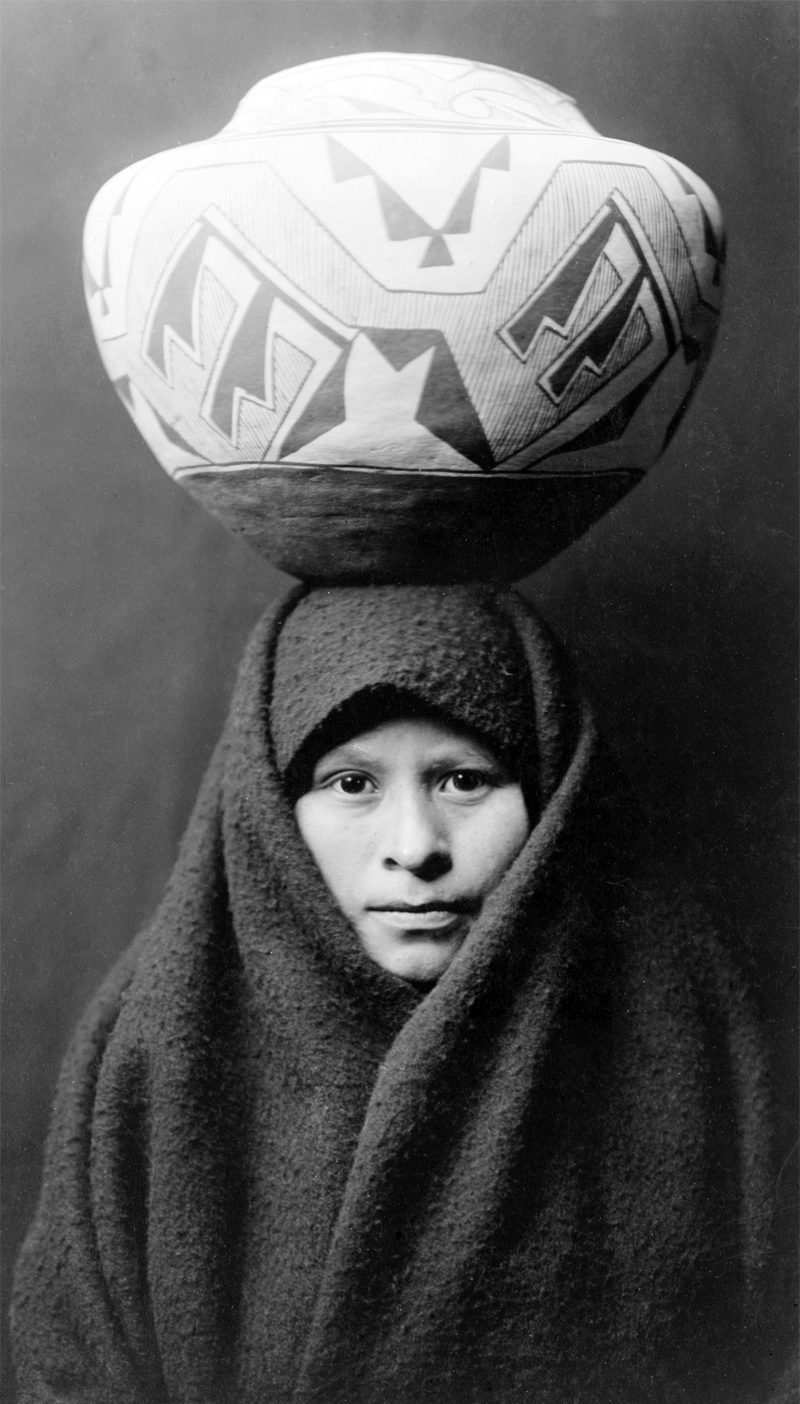
Zuni Girl with Jar, c. 1903. Head-and-shoulders portrait of a Zuni girl with a pottery jar on her head.

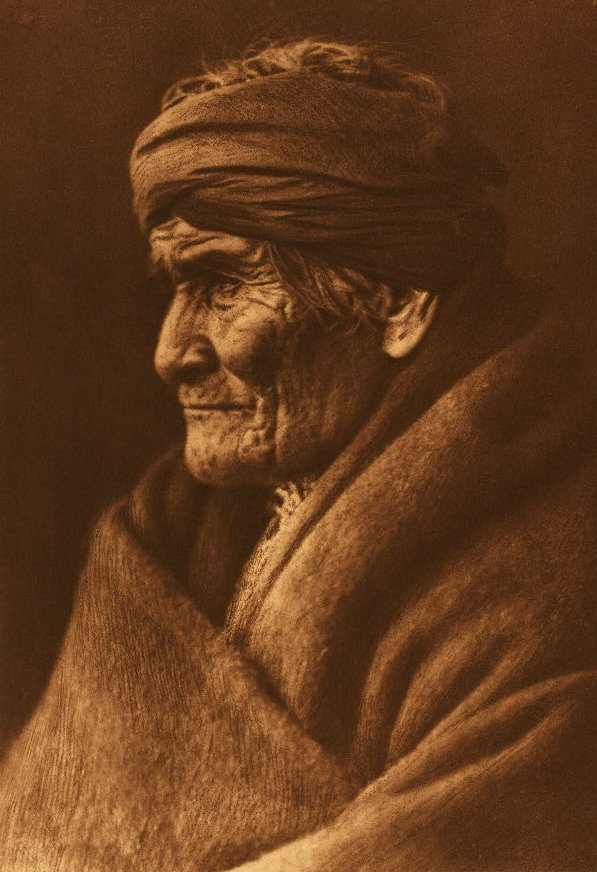
Geronimo – Apache (1905)

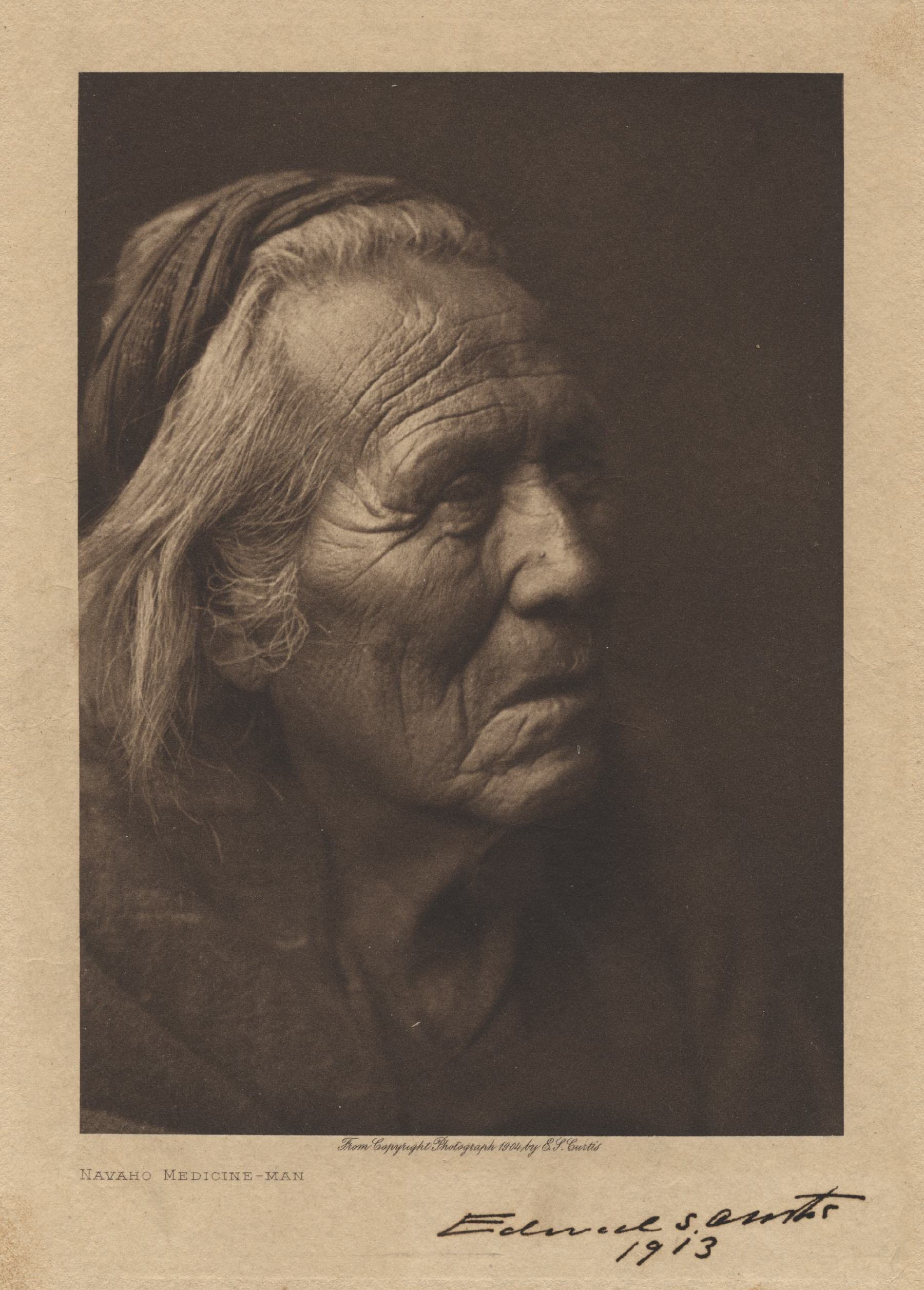
Navaho medicine-man, c. 1904 (with 1913 signature)

Youth called Shows As He Goes, c. 1907

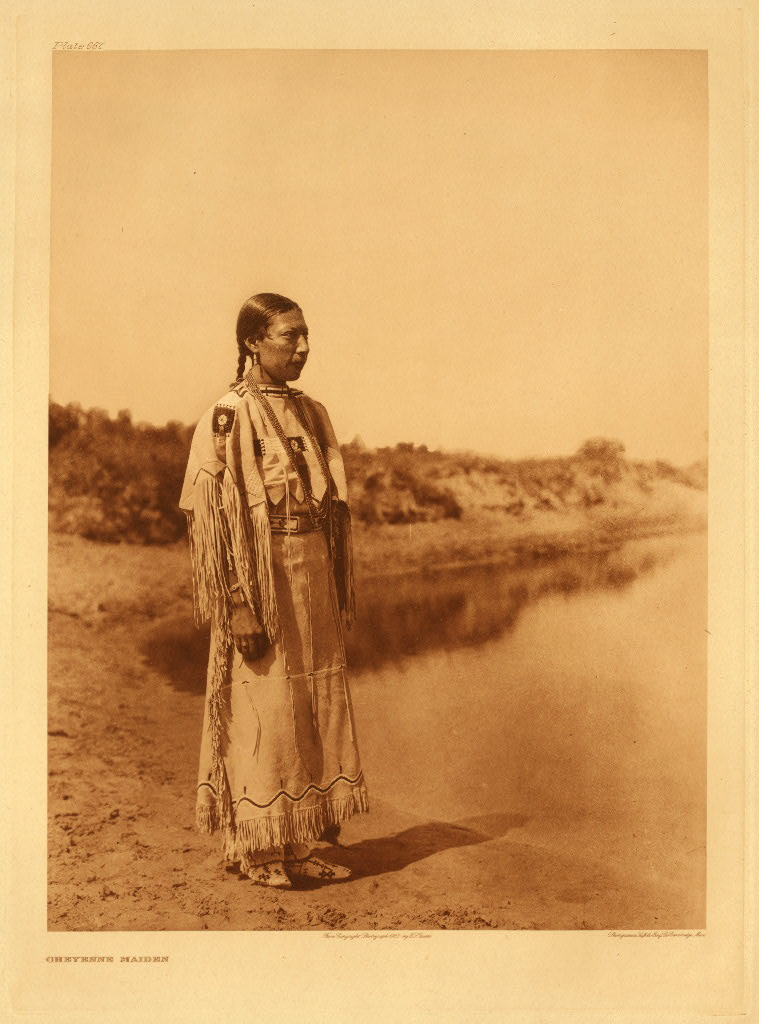
Cheyenne maiden, 1930

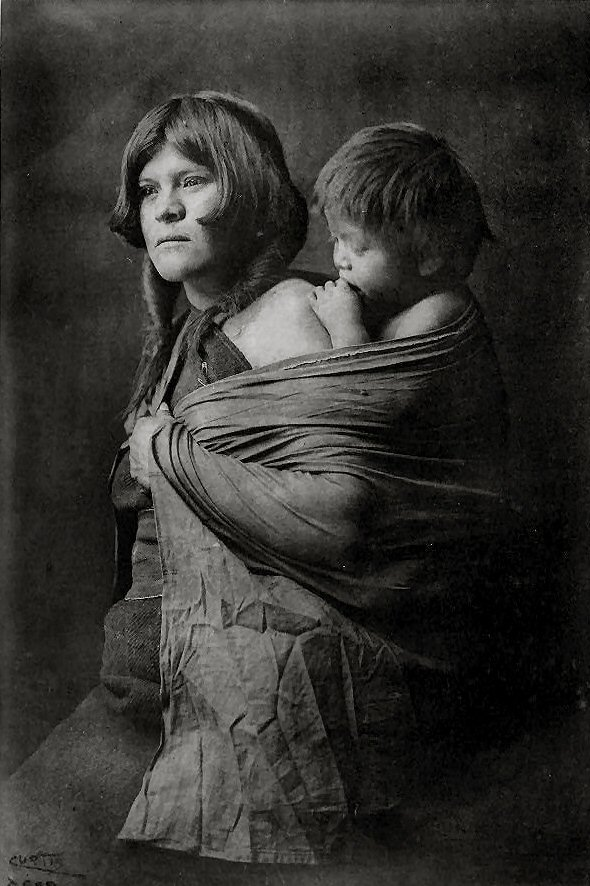
Hopi mother, 1922

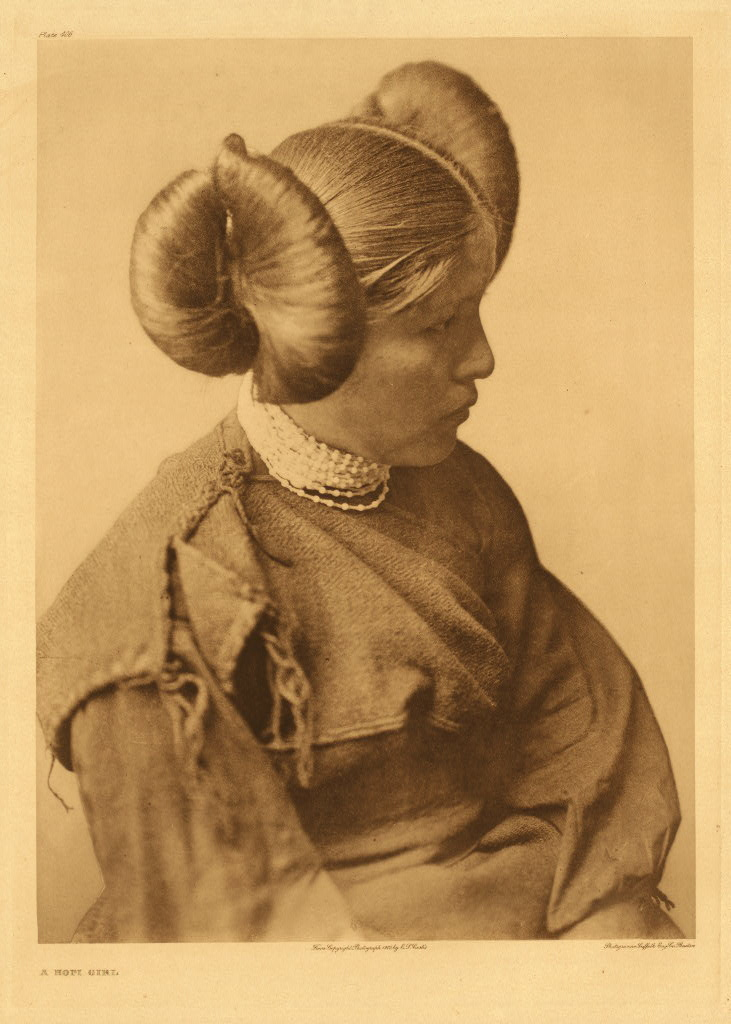
Hopi girl, 1922
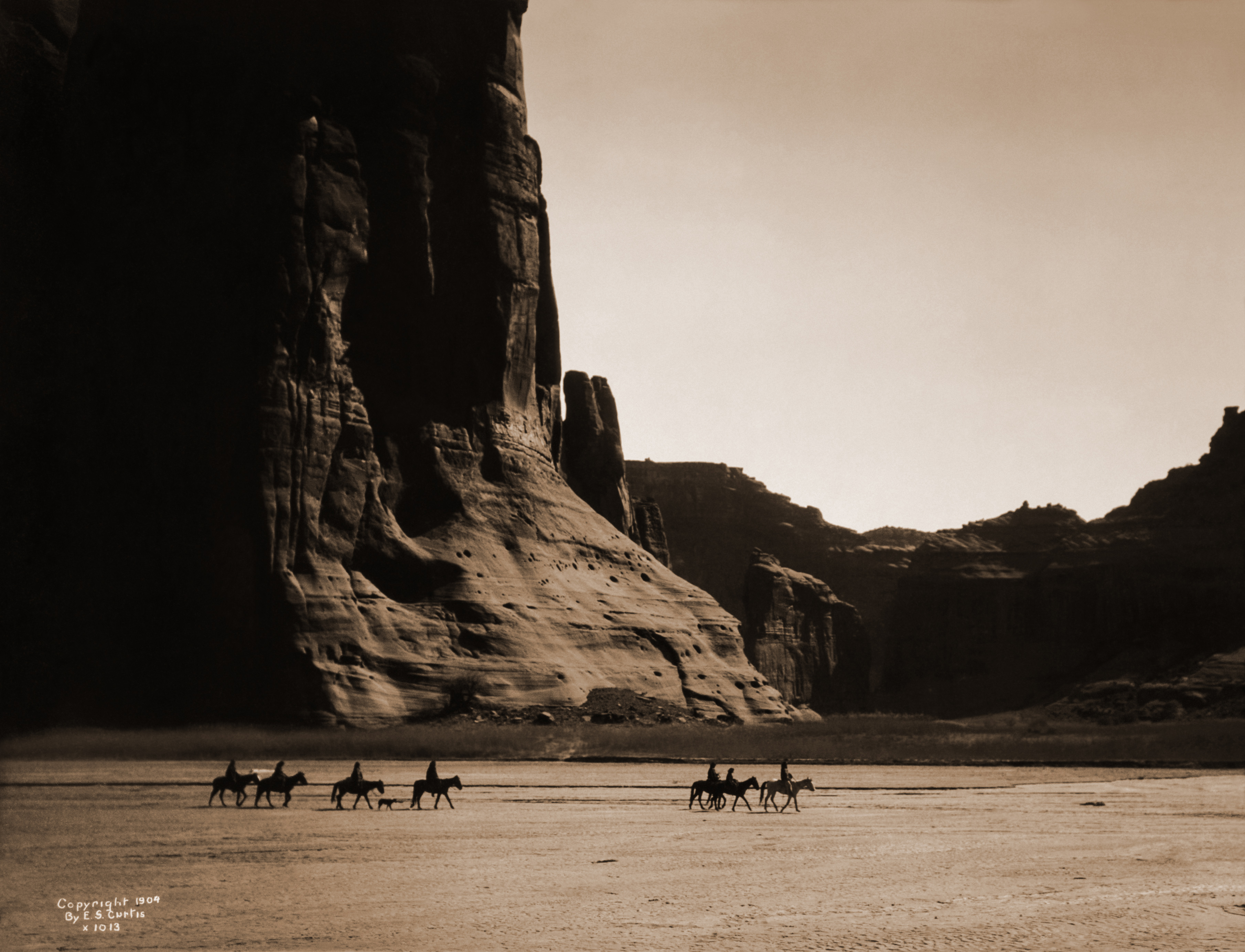
Canyon de Chelly – Navajo. Seven riders on horseback and dog trek against background of canyon cliffs, 1904

Apache Scout, c. 1900s

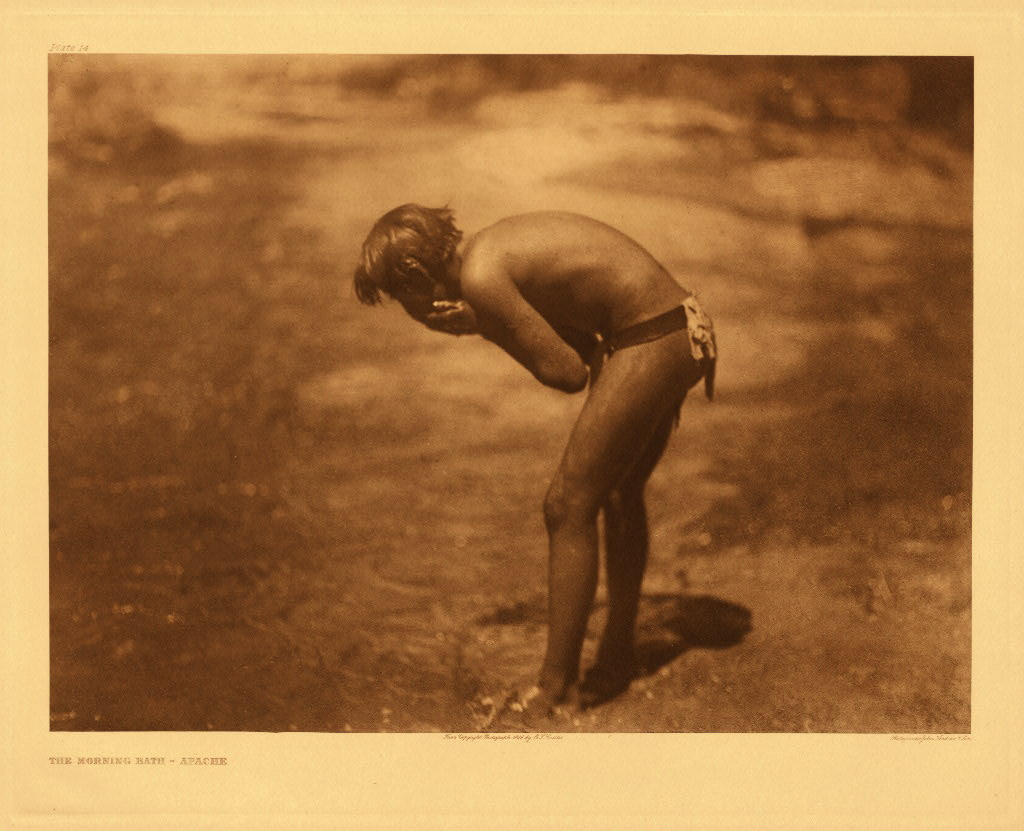
Apache, Morning bath, c. 1907

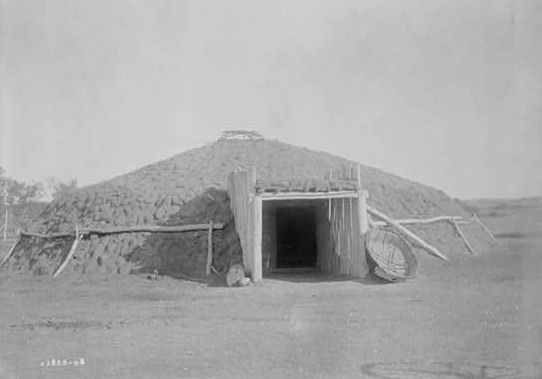
Mandan lodge, North Dakota, c. 1908

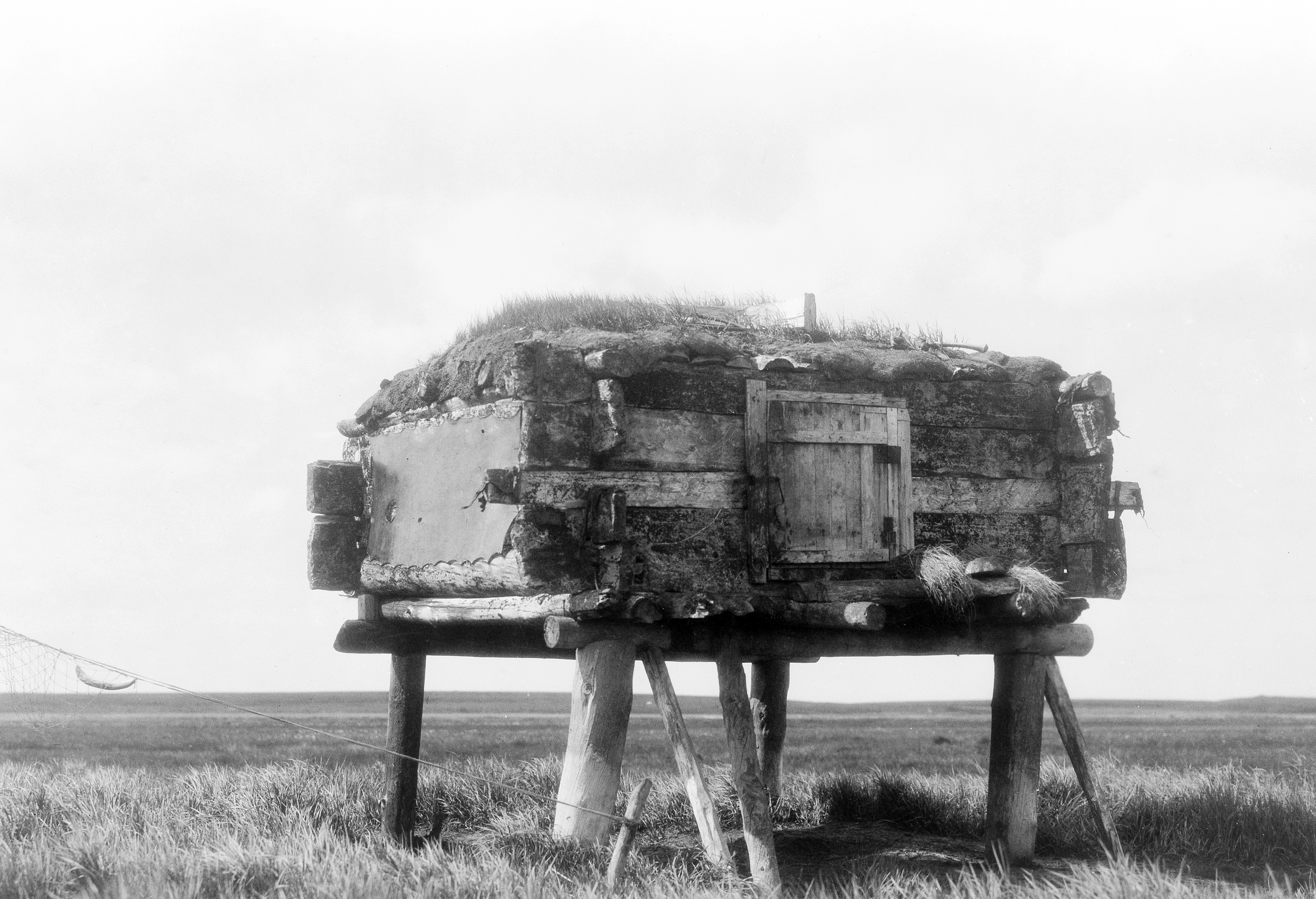
Food caches, Hooper Bay, Alaska, c. 1929

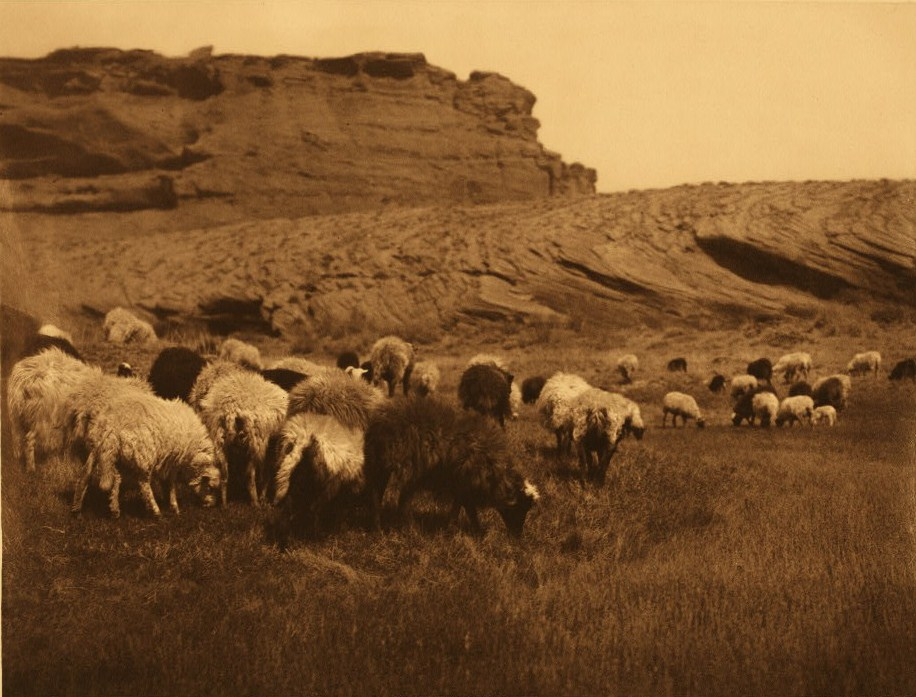
Navajo Flocks, c. 1904

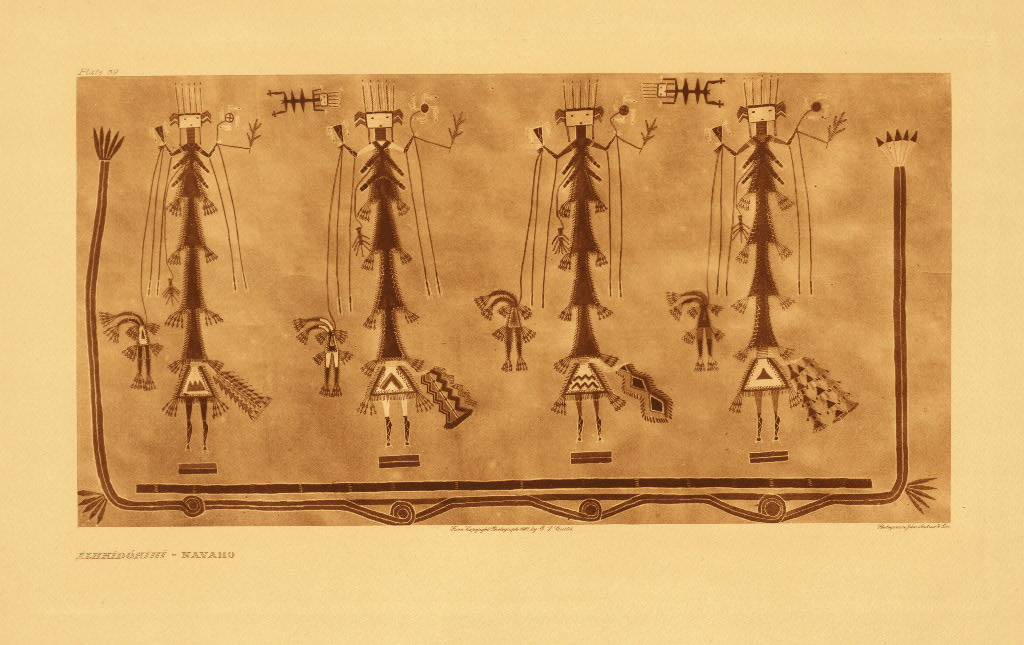
Navajo Sandpainting, c. 1907

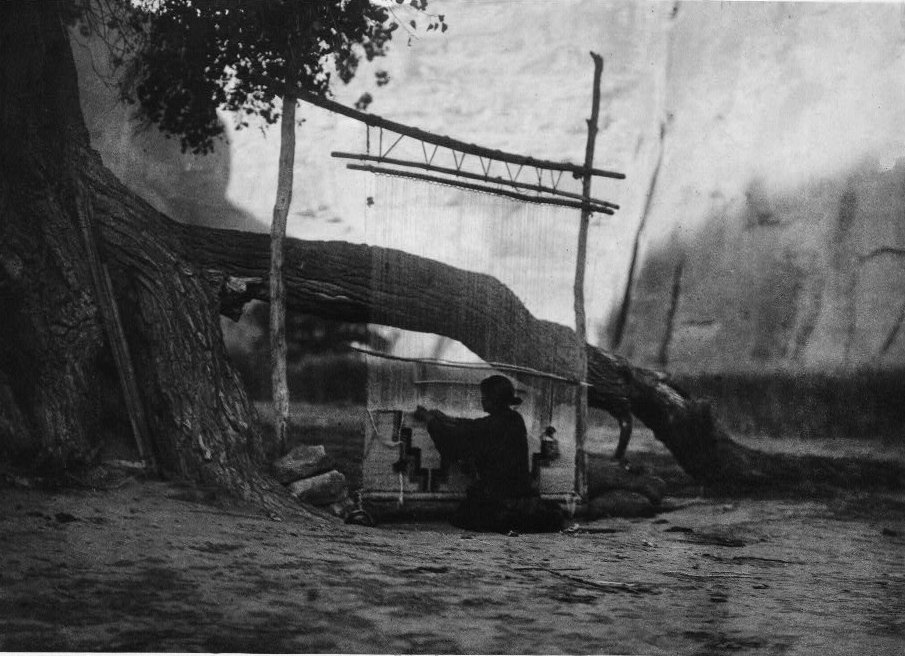
Navajo Weaver, c. 1907

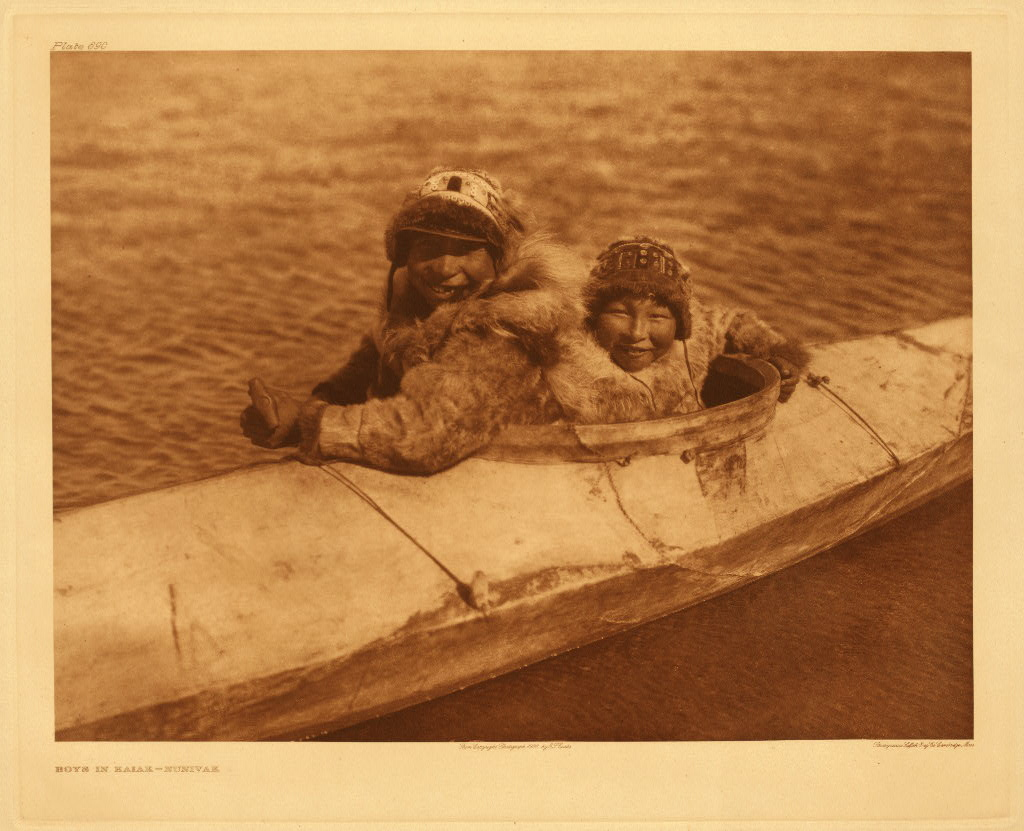
Boys in kayak, Nunivak, 1930

== Works ==
=== Books ===
- The North American Indian. 20 volumes (1907–1930)
  - Volume 1 (1907): The Apache. The Jicarillas. The Navaho.
  - Volume 2 (1908): The Pima. The Papago. The Qahatika. The Mohave. The Yuma. The Maricopa. The Walapai. The Havasupai. The Apache-Mohave, or Yavapai.
  - Volume 3 (1908): The Teton Sioux. The Yanktonai. The Assiniboin.
  - Volume 4 (1909): The Apsaroke, or Crows. The Hidatsa.
  - Volume 5 (1909): The Mandan. The Arikara. The Atsina.
  - Volume 6 (1911): The Piegan. The Cheyenne. The Arapaho.
  - Volume 7 (1911): The Yakima. The Klickitat. Salishan tribes of the interior. The Kutenai.
  - Volume 8 (1911): The Nez Perces. Wallawalla. Umatilla. Cayuse. The Chinookan tribes.
  - Volume 9 (1913): The Salishan tribes of the coast. The Chimakum and the Quilliute. The Willapa.
  - Volume 10 (1915): The Kwakiutl.
  - Volume 11 (1916): The Nootka. The Haida.
  - Volume 12 (1922): The Hopi.
  - Volume 13 (1924): The Hupa. The Yurok. The Karok. The Wiyot. Tolowa and Tututni. The Shasta. The Achomawi. The Klamath.
  - Volume 14 (1924): The Kato. The Wailaki. The Yuki. The Pomo. The Wintun. The Maidu. The Miwok. The Yokuts.
  - Volume 15 (1926): Southern California Shoshoneans. The Diegueños. Plateau Shoshoneans. The Washo.
  - Volume 16 (1926): The Tiwa. The Keres.
  - Volume 17 (1926): The Tewa. The Zuñi.
  - Volume 18 (1928): The Chipewyan. The Western Woods Cree. The Sarsi.
  - Volume 19 (1930): The Indians of Oklahoma. The Wichita. The Southern Cheyenne. The Oto. The Comanche. The Peyote Cult.
  - Volume 20 (1930): The Alaskan Eskimo. The Nunivak. The Eskimo of Hooper Bay. The Eskimo of King Island. The Eskimo of Little Diomede Island. The Eskimo of Cape Prince of Wales. The Kotzebue Eskimo. The Noatak. The Kobuk. The Selawik.
- Indian Days of the Long Ago (1914)
- In the Land of the Head-Hunters (1915)

=== Articles ===
- "The Rush to the Klondike Over the Mountain Pass". The Century Magazine, March 1898, pp. 692–697.
- "Vanishing Indian Types: The Tribes of the Southwest". Scribner's Magazine 39:5 (May 1906): 513–529.
- "Vanishing Indian Types: The Tribes of the Northwest Plains". Scribner's Magazine 39:6 (June 1906): 657–71.
- "Indians of the Stone Houses". Scribner's Magazine 45:2 (1909): 161–75.
- "Village Tribes of the Desert Land. Scribner's Magazine 45:3 (1909): 274–87.

=== Brochures ===
- The North American Indian. (promotional brochure) (1914?)

=== Exhibitions ===
- Edward Sheriff Curtis, Provinciaal Museum Hasselt (now House for Contemporary Art, Design & Architecture) in collaboration with TransArt Köln, Hasselt, Belgium, March 16, 1991 – May 5, 1991
- Exposition virtuelle E. S. Curtis, collection photographique du Musée du Nouveau Monde, La Rochelle, 2012 to August 31, 2019
- Rediscovering Genius: The Works of Edward S. Curtis. Depart Foundation, Los Angeles, November 18, 2016 – January 14, 2017
- Light and Legacy: The Art and Techniques of Edward Curtis Western Spirit: Scottsdale's Museum of the West, Scottsdale, Arizona, October 19, 2021 – Spring 2023

== See also ==
- In the Land of the Head Hunters
- Photography by indigenous peoples of the Americas
- Short Nights of the Shadow Catcher: The Epic Life and Immortal Photographs of Edward Curtis, by Timothy Egan.
