= Nesjaja Hatali =

Navajo leader

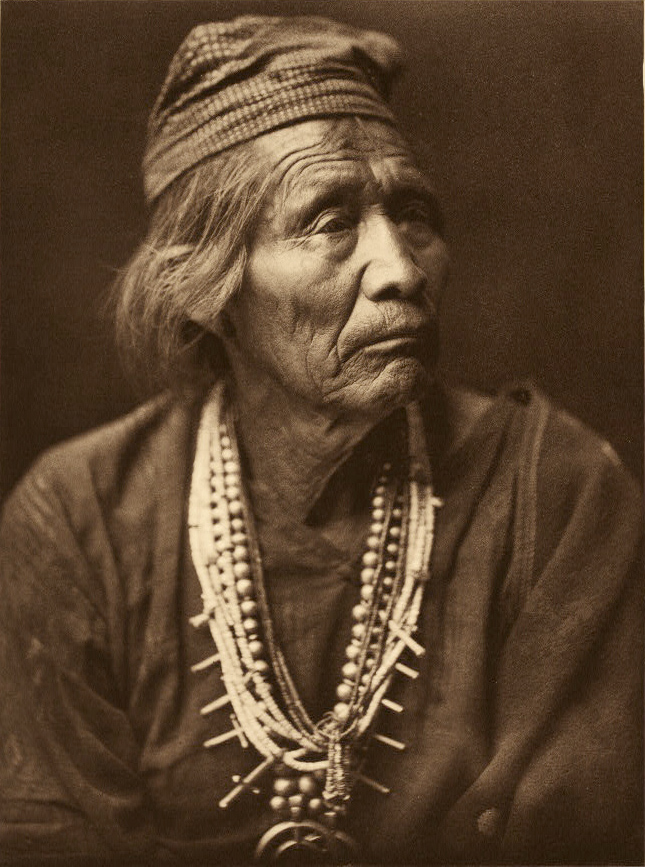
Portrait of Hatali in 1904 by Edward S. Curtis

Nesjaja Hatali was a Navajo leader.

Hatali was a medicine man in the Navajo tribe, but soon resisted US expansion into the southwest, alongside Manuelito. Alongside several other war chiefs such as Nova and Geronimo, he was able to use guerrilla tactics to defeat American columns of troops and harass supply lines until the Navajo nation surrendered in 1866. But in the wartime, he was a very successful war leader despite being more knowledgeable in the arts of medicine.
